= New York State Comptroller elections =

Election for a state official

Elections for New York State Comptroller are held every four years. The next scheduled election is due to be held in 2026. The current state comptroller is Thomas DiNapoli.

The Comptroller is directly elected using a first past the post voting system.

== Elections ==
=== 1986 ===
The 1986 election was held on November 4. Republican Incumbent Edward Regan held his office, entering a third term as Comptroller.

1986 New York State Comptroller Election
Party	Candidate	Votes	%	±%
Republican	Edward Regan (incumbent)	2,274,548	57.20%	N/A
Democratic	Herman Badillo	1,593,174	40.07%	N/A
Right to Life	Mary Jane Tobin	91,236	2.29%	N/A
New Alliance	Mary Fridley	17,447	0.44%	N/A
Total votes		4,976,399	100.00%	

=== 1990 ===
The 1990 election was held on November 6. Republican Incumbent Edward Regan held his office, entering his fourth term as Comptroller.

1990 New York State Comptroller Election
Party	Candidate	Votes	%	±%
Republican	Edward Regan (incumbent)	1,942,911	49.24%	N/A
Democratic	Carol Bellamy	1,841,826	46.68%	N/A
Right to Life	Donna M. Kearney	116,743	2.96%	N/A
Libertarian	Vicki Kirkland	17,093	0.43%	N/A
Socialist Workers	Aaron Ruby	11,118	0..28%	N/A
New Alliance	Emmy Gay	15,752	0.40%	N/A
Total votes		3,945,443	100.00%	

=== 1994 ===
The 1994 election was held on November 8. Carl McCall had been appointed by the legislature to fill the remaining year of the term held by outgoing Comptroller Edward Regan. London had previously been the Conservative Party's candidate for governor in 1990 and was offered the Comptroller spot according to many as a compromise between the Conservatives and Republicans:

H. Carl McCall; Democrat; Liberal 2,404,404; 51.80%	Herbert I. London; Republican; Conservative/Tax Cut Now; Right to Life 2,155,759; 46.44%	Laureen A. Oliver; Independence Fusion 53,801; 1.16%	Richard L. Geyer; Libertarian 17,986; 0.39%	Brock Satter; Socialist Workers Party 10,078; 0.22%

=== 1998 ===
The 1998 election was held on November 3. Democratic incumbent Carl McCall defeated Republican challenger Bruce Blakeman by a wide margin:

H. Carl McCall; Democrat; Independence; Liberal; Working Families; 2,862,903; 64.75%	Bruce A. Blakeman; Republican; Conservative 1,423,086; 32.19%	Douglas H. Harknett; Right to Life 70,397; 1.59%	Dean Venezia; Marijuana Reform 39,423; 0.89%	Howie Hawkins; Green 15,133; 0.34%	Robert M. Goodman; Libertarian 10,310; 0.23%

4,985,514 ballots have been cast on that election. Out of them, 564,262 were declared blank, void or missing.

=== 2002 ===
The 2002 election was held on November 5. New York City Comptroller Alan Hevesi defeated former Assembly Minority Leader John Faso:

Alan Hevesi; Democrat; Liberal; Working Families 2,095,913; 50.41%	John Faso; Republican; Independence; Conservative 1,933,104; 46.50%	Garifalia Christea; Right to Life 61,464; 1.48%	Howie Hawkins; Green 47,771; 1.15%	James Eisert; Libertarian 19,235; 0.46%

4,690,714 ballots have been cast on that election. Out of them, 533,227 were declared blank, void or missing.

=== 2006 ===
The 2006 election was held on November 7. Democratic incumbent Alan Hevesi won re-election, entering his second term in office; however, he resigned prior to the commencement of his term.

General election results
Party	Candidate	Votes	%
Democratic	Alan Hevesi (incumbent)	2,193,602	56.37%
Republican	Christopher Callaghan	1,535,329	39.45%
Green	Julia Willebrand	108,165	2.78%
Libertarian	John Cain	38,483	0.99%
Socialist Workers	Willie Cotton	15,786	0.40%
Total votes		4,134,973	100%
Democratic hold			

=== 2010 ===
The 2010 election was held on November 2. Democratic incumbent Thomas DiNapoli won re-election, entering his first full term as Comptroller. Prior to this election, Thomas DiNapoli held the office of New York State Comptroller since being appointed by the Governor of New York on February 7, 2007.

General election results
Party	Candidate	Votes	%
Democratic	Thomas P. DiNapoli	2,272,805	50.78
Republican	Harry Wilson	2,070,349	46.26
Green	Julia A. Willebrand	104,482	2.33
Libertarian	John Gaetani	27,898	0.62
Total votes		4,475,534	100.0

=== 2014 ===
The 2014 election was held on November 4. Democratic incumbent Thomas DiNapoli won re-election, entering his second term as Comptroller.

2014 New York State Comptroller Election
Party	Candidate	Votes	Percentage
Democratic	Thomas DiNapoli	1,935,847	56.64%
Working Families	Thomas DiNapoli	175,328	4.47%
Independence/ Women's Equality	Thomas DiNapoli	121,882	3.11%
Total	Thomas DiNapoli (incumbent)	2,223,057	59.87%
Republican	Robert Antonacci	1,108,016	28.23%
Conservative/ Stop-Common-Core	Robert Antonacci	246,627	6.28%
Total	Robert Antonacci	1,354,643	36.48%
Green	Theresa Portelli	97,906	2.64%
Libertarian	John Clifton	36,583	0.99%
Blank		209,613	5.34%
Void		1,910	0.05%
Write-in		1,197	0.03%
Totals		3,924,909	100%
Democratic Hold

=== 2018 ===
The 2018 election was held on November 6. Democratic incumbent Thomas DiNapoli won re-election, entering his third term as Comptroller.

New York Comptroller election, 2018
Party	Candidate	Votes	%	±%
Democratic	Thomas DiNapoli	3,714,787	61.76%	+5.12%
Working Families	Thomas DiNapoli	155,873	2.59%	−1.88%
Independence	Thomas DiNapoli	106,971	1.78%	−1.33%
Women's Equality	Thomas DiNapoli	35,613	0.59%	−2.52%
Reform	Thomas DiNapoli	14,642	0.24%	N/A
Total	Thomas DiNapoli (incumbent)	4,027,886	66.96%	+7.09%
Republican	Jonathan Trichter	1,651,578	27.46%	−0.77%
Conservative	Jonathan Trichter	231,380	3.84%	−2.44%
Total	Jonathan Trichter	1,882,958	31.30%	−5.18%
Green	Mark Dunlea	70,041	1.16%	−1.48%
Libertarian	Cruger E. Gallaudet	34,430	0.57%	−0.42%
Total votes		6,015,315	100%	N/A
Democratic hold				

=== 2022 ===
The 2022 election was held on November 6. Democratic incumbent Thomas DiNapoli won re-election, entering his third term as Comptroller.

2022 New York State Comptroller election
Party	Candidate	Votes	%	±%
Democratic	Thomas DiNapoli	2,980,833	51.67%	−10.09%
Working Families	Thomas DiNapoli	324,279	5.62%	+3.03%
Total	Thomas DiNapoli (incumbent)	3,305,112	57.29%	−9.67%
Republican	Paul Rodriguez	2,171,067	37.64%	+10.18%
Conservative	Paul Rodriguez	292,337	5.07%	+1.23%
Total	Paul Rodriguez	2,463,404	42.71%	+11.41%
Total votes		5,768,516	100.0%	
Democratic hold				

== See also ==
- Politics of New York (state)
- New York gubernatorial elections
- New York Attorney General elections
