= Elections in New York (state) =

In New York, general elections for governor are held every four years, in even-numbered years when there is no presidential election. General elections for the State Legislature (State Senate and State Assembly) are held in November of every even-numbered year.

New York is a state where voters typically vote for Democratic Party candidates. As of 2025, there are more than twice as many enrolled Democratic voters as there are enrolled Republican voters in New York. Democratic candidates prevailed in New York in every presidential election from 1988 to 2024. As of 2025, no Republican candidate had won a statewide election in New York since George Pataki was re-elected governor in 2002. The New York State Senate has been led by the Democratic Party since 2019, while the New York State Assembly has been led by the Democrats since 1975.

New York is nearly unique among the states in that it allows electoral fusion (cross-endorsement). In a 2020 study, New York was ranked as the 17th easiest state for citizens to vote in.

== Electoral system ==
=== Electoral procedure ===
Primary elections are elections at which enrolled members of a party nominate party candidates for the general election and elect party officers. New York uses closed primaries and only an enrolled member of a party can vote in its primaries. The election district is the basic electoral administrative division, containing a maximum of 950 registered voters (although it may be as large as 2000 registered voters with the approval of the county board of elections) with boundaries determined by the local board of elections.

Sample designating petition

The person for party nomination for public office who receives a plurality of the vote is nominated as the party candidate, except in New York City primaries for city offices, which use ranked-choice voting. The state central committee of a political party designates people for statewide public offices in the primary election by majority vote, but people who receive at least 25% of the committee votes may contest the primary, and people may also contest the primary by collecting 15000 petition signatures, or 5% of the party's enrolled active voters in the state if fewer, with at least 100 signatories, or 5% of enrolled active voters if fewer, from each of one-half of the congressional districts.

The political party county executive committees in cities and towns and the party caucus in villages typically select candidates for local offices, with the local committees ratifying the selections. In New York City, candidates for the citywide offices are designated jointly by the five county executive committees of each party, and a local political club (which is not an official party organization) may also play a major role in nomination and selection. Judicial nominating conventions, composed of judicial delegates elected from assembly districts within the judicial district, nominate New York Supreme Court justices. The designation of a person to contest a party nomination for public office, and the nomination of a person for a party office, at a primary election is by designating petition.

New York is near unique among the states in that it allows electoral fusion (cross-endorsement), allowing two or more parties to nominate the same person for office. Early mail voting is allowed for any voter, and absentee ballots are allowed for voters who are away from their residence on election day, ill, or physically disabled. The minimum age for suffrage is eighteen years old. Individuals who have been convicted of a felony are disenfranchised while incarcerated; individuals on parole or probation retain the right to vote. Local boards of elections are required to hold voter registration between the sixth and fourth Saturday before a general election. Voter registration at local boards of elections is closed for ten days before an election. Voter registration by mail is allowed. Voters may choose to enroll in a political party during voter registration.

=== Party system ===
Parties that received at least 130,000 votes or 2% of the vote, whichever is greater, in the previous gubernatorial election and presidential election qualify for "official" status and automatic statewide ballot access. The gubernatorial vote also determines the order on the ballot. There are a number of minor parties in New York State which do not qualify for ballot status.

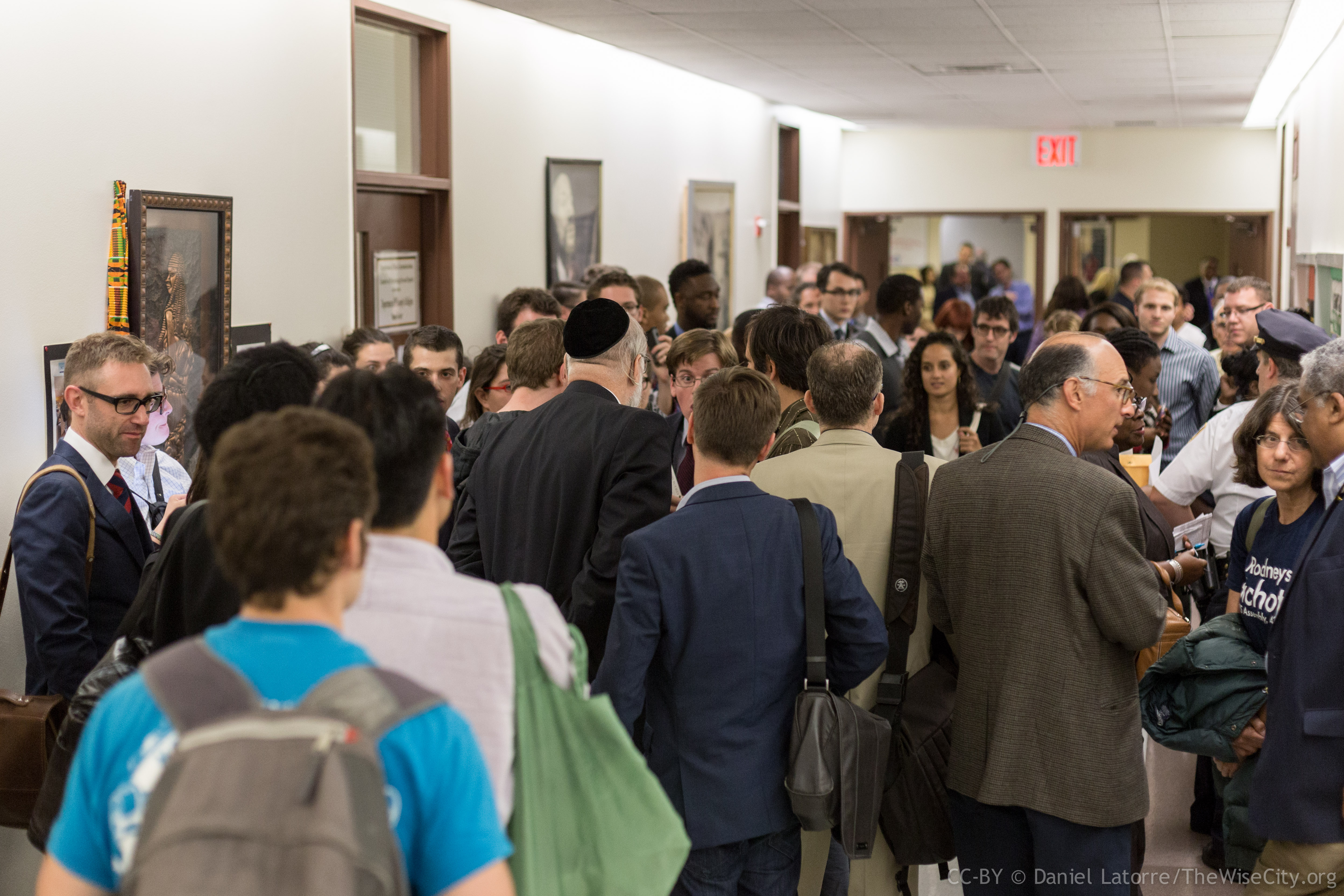
Outside a 2014 Brooklyn Democratic Party meeting

The Election Law defines the structure of political parties and requires each party to have county committees and a state committee. The county committees are composed of at least two members elected from each election district, plus any additional members the county committee's rules provide for that district in proportion to its party vote for governor. In the five counties of New York City, the executive committees of the county committees are composed of the district leaders and other officers; outside New York City, the executive committees are composed of the chairmen of the local political committees (of each city, town, and village within the county, composed of county committee members from those localities) and other officers. In principle, county committee members select the county committee chair, but in New York City the practice is that the district leaders control the choice. Judicial nominating conventions, which nominate New York Supreme Court justices, are composed of judicial delegates elected from assembly districts within the judicial district.

The state committees are in practice composed of members determined by county committee chairmen augmented by representatives of other constituency groups according to party bylaws. In principle, a chairperson and executive committee are chosen by the state committee, although in practice a sitting governor of the party will effectively name the chairperson. The state committee chairperson and executive committee select one man and one woman for the national committee, select at-large delegates and chairpersons for the national convention, select candidates for statewide offices, and conduct party activities.

=== Reform ===
A 2005 study by the Grassroots Initiative found that in New York City more than 50% of committee membership was vacant and that 98% of committee member elections were uncontested. In suburban and rural areas, informed observers estimate that at least one-third of committee membership is vacant. New York's judicial conventions have also been criticized as opaque, brief, and dominated by county party leaders.

== Colonial electoral history ==
The voting population of the Province of New York rose from 2,000 in 1698, to 23,000 in 1790. The secret ballot did not exist at the time and all elections were conducted in the county town under the supervision of the sheriff. Elections in Albany County were controlled by the Schuyler, Livingston, and Van Rensselaer families.

Elections for the 1st New York Provincial Congress were slated to be held on April 28, 1775, but continued into June, which was almost three weeks after the Congress started its session. The next session's elections were meant to be held on November 7, 1776, but by the opening day of November 14, only 9 of 14 counties had selected their deputies. A quorum did not exist until the deputies decided to organize the session on December 1, and a quorum was established on December 6.

== State electoral history ==
=== Elected offices ===
Gubernatorial election results
Year	Democratic	Republican
1950	42.3% 2,246,855	53.1% 2,819,523
1954	49.6% 2,560,738	49.4% 2,549,613
1958	44.7% 2,553,895	54.7% 3,126,929
1962	44.0% 2,552,418	53.1% 3,081,587
1966	38.1% 2,298,363	44.6% 2,690,626
1970	40.3% 2,421,426	52.4% 3,151,432
1974	57.2% 3,028,503	41.9% 2,219,667
1978	51.0% 2,429,272	45.2% 2,156,404
1982	50.9% 2,675,213	47.5% 2,494,827
1986	64.6% 2,775,045	31.8% 1,363,968
1990	53.2% 2,157,087	21.4% 865,948
1994	45.5% 2,364,906	48.8% 2,538,702
1998	33.2% 1,570,317	54.3% 2,571,991
2002	33.5% 1,534,064	49.4% 2,262,255
2006	69.6% 3,086,709	28.7% 1,274,335
2010	62.5% 2,910,876	33.2% 1,547,857
2014	54.2% 2,069,480	40.2% 1,536,879
2018	59.6% 3,635,340	36.2% 2,207,602
2022	53.1% 3,140,415	46.7% 2,762,581

The governor, lieutenant governor, attorney general, state comptroller and the two U.S. senators are now the only statewide elected officials. The first state election was held in June 1777, and the Governor and Lieutenant Governor were the only statewide elected officials. Besides them, the Assemblymen were elected in the counties, and the state senators in the senatorial districts.

Until 1821, a state election was held annually, lasting three days, beginning on the last Monday in April. The Assembly was completely and the Senate partly renewed. Every three years, a governor and a lieutenant governor were elected, all other state officials were appointed by the Council of Appointments. From 1822 to 1841, the state elections have been held lasting three days, beginning on the first Monday in November. The governor and the lieutenant governor continued to be the only statewide elected officials. Since November 1842, the election has been held on a single day, the date fixed on the Tuesday after the first Monday in November (the date thus ranging from November 2 to 8). In 1844, four Canal Commissioners were also elected statewide. In 1846, the governor, lieutenant governor, and two Canal Commissioners were elected. All other statewide officials were elected by joint ballot of the state legislature .

The Constitution of 1846 made most of the state offices elective by popular ballot. From 1847 on, the governor, lieutenant governor, secretary of state, attorney general, state comptroller, State Treasurer, state engineer, three Canal Commissioners, three prison inspectors, four judges and the clerk of the New York Court of Appeals were elected statewide with different terms in office.

From 1870 on, a chief judge and six associate judges of the Court of Appeals were elected, and since then the Clerk of the Court of Appeals has been appointed by the court. In 1876, the offices of Canal Commissioner and Inspector of State Prisons were abolished, and their successors were appointed by the governor. From 1914 on, the U.S. senators from New York were elected statewide too. The offices of the treasurer and the state engineer were abolished in 1926. The office of secretary of state became appointive by the governor in 1927. Since 1938, the legislative term is two years for both state senators and assemblymen, so that state elections are held now only in even-numbered years. Until 1973, judges of the Court of Appeals were occasionally elected in odd-numbered years, and the judges of the New York Court of Appeals became appointed in 1978.

=== Party enrollment ===
New York party enrollment data as of February 20, 2026:
Party	%	Total voters		Total
Party	%	Active	Inactive	Total
Democratic	48.07	6,002,006	443,599	6,445,605
Republican	22.34	2,835,976	158,863	2,994,839
Conservative	1.26	160,464	8,849	169,313
Working Families	0.47	59,617	3,850	63,467
Minor parties	2.42	301,469	23,077	324,546
Unaffiliated	25.43	3,187,610	222,678	3,410,288
Total	100%	12,547,142	860,916	13,408,058

== Federal electoral history ==
New York State has voted Democratic in national elections since 1988. However, New York City has been the most important source of political fund-raising in the United States for both major parties. Four of the top five zip codes in the nation for political contributions are in Manhattan. The top zip code, 10021 on the Upper East Side, generated the most money for the 2000 presidential campaigns of both George Bush and Al Gore. Republican presidential candidates have often skipped campaigning in the state, taking it as a loss and focusing on vital swing states.

Many of the state's other urban areas, including Albany, Ithaca, Buffalo, Rochester, and Syracuse are also Democratic. Upstate New York, especially in rural areas, is generally more conservative than the cities and historically tended to vote Republican, although Democrats have made dramatic gains upstate in recent elections, and today the region is much more evenly split. Heavily populated suburban areas such as Westchester County and Long Island have swung from reliably Republican to unreliably Democratic in federal elections over the past 25 years, although local races there are still often tightly contested.

Democrats Al Smith, Franklin Delano Roosevelt and W. Averell Harriman served as governor, as did Republicans Thomas Dewey and Nelson Rockefeller, who was elected four times. Progressive Republican Theodore Roosevelt was Governor of New York before being elected vice president in 1900.

=== Congressional delegation ===
New York's delegation to the US House of Representatives is composed mostly of Democrats. Republicans have not held a majority of New York US House seats since 1965. This is due almost entirely to the Democrats' near-total domination of local elections in New York City, which contains 13 of the state's 26 districts. Staten Island is currently the only part of the city that regularly elects Republicans.

With the defeats of Republican incumbents Sue Kelly and John Sweeney and a Democratic victory in the open seat of Sherwood Boehlert in 2006, New York sent 23 Democrats and six Republicans to the 110th Congress. Two years later, Randy Kuhl was unseated by Eric Massa in the 29th District, and Dan Maffei won the seat of retiring Jim Walsh in the Syracuse area. As a result, New York's congressional delegation consisted of 26 Democrats and three Republicans at the start of the 111th Congress. The three Republicans were the fewest to have ever represented New York in the House, and only a fourth of the number New York sent to that body only a decade earlier. In November 2009, Democrat Bill Owens won a special election for a North Country seat previously held by Republican John McHugh, who resigned to become Secretary of the Army, bringing the delegation to 27 Democrats and 2 Republicans. In addition to holding every seat in New York City, Democrats held all but one seat on Long Island and every House seat in the Hudson Valley. However, in 2010, the Republicans gained 6 seats, all of which had been picked up by Democrats in 2006 or 2008. Five were in Upstate New York, and one was on Staten Island. They also came within a few hundred votes of unseating 1st district incumbent Tim Bishop of Suffolk County. In 2011, Democrat Kathy Hochul won a special election in New York's 26th congressional district, which means that every seat, except the Long Island-based 2nd congressional district (which was numbered as the 3rd prior to the 2011 redistricting), has elected a Democratic representative at least once since 2006.

New York lost two congressional districts as a result of the 2010 census, and the 2012 elections resulted in the balance of the delegation being 21 Democrats and 6 Republicans; Democrats Dan Maffei and Sean Patrick Maloney respectively unseated Republican incumbents Ann Marie Buerkle and Nan Hayworth in the 24th, centered in Syracuse, and the 18th, in the Hudson Valley, while Republican Chris Collins defeated Hochul in western New York's 27th. Republicans made gains in 2014, defeating two incumbents and picking up one open seat. After no changes in 2016, Democrats defeated three Republican incumbents in 2018, as Max Rose won the Staten Island district, while Anthony Brindisi and Antonio Delgado were respectively elected to seats in Central New York and in the Hudson Valley. Notably, the three districts that flipped from Republican to Democratic in 2018 had all been won by Donald Trump two years earlier, however, Democrats then lost two of those seats in 2020. Democrats did suffer significant losses in New York in the 2022 elections, despite a red wave not occurring in much of the rest of the United States. Democrats were reduced to a 15–11 majority in the delegation, were completely shut out of Long Island, and held just four seats outside of New York City proper.

This recent Democratic dominance may be explained by the exodus of non-Hispanic white voters to other parts of the country, in addition to the large influx of predominantly Hispanic minorities to the state. With few exceptions, upstate New York and Long Island have historically been dominated by a moderate brand of Republicanism. Since the early 1990s, many voters in traditional Republican strongholds such as Long Island, Syracuse, and the Hudson Valley have voted for Democratic candidates at the national level. In addition to New York City, Democrats continue to do well around Rochester, Albany, and Buffalo, as they have done since the 1930s. New York City, for instance, has not been carried by a Republican presidential candidate since 1924.

=== U.S. senators ===
Currently, New York is represented in the U.S. Senate by Chuck Schumer of Brooklyn and Kirsten Gillibrand of Columbia County, both Democrats.

Over the last five decades, New York has elected Democratic Senators Daniel Patrick Moynihan, Robert F. Kennedy, and Hillary Clinton as well as Republican Senators Jacob K. Javits, Alfonse D'Amato and Conservative Senator James Buckley. New York politics have recently been dominated by downstate areas such as Westchester County, New York City and Long Island, where a majority of the state's population resides. Before the appointment of Kirsten Gillibrand to the Senate in 2009, the most recent US Senator from upstate was Charles Goodell, appointed to fill out the remainder of Robert F. Kennedy's term, serving from 1968 to 1971. Goodell was from (Jamestown). Before the election of Kirsten Gillibrand in 2010, the last senator from upstate to be elected was Kenneth Keating of Rochester, in 1958.

Schumer's victory over Republican Alfonse D'Amato in 1998 gave the Democrats both of the state's Senate seats for the first time since 1947. In 2004, conservative Michael Benjamin battled with the New York Republican State Committee for a chance to run against Schumer, which decided in August 2004 there would be no primary and selected moderate Assemblyman Howard Mills as the Republican candidate. Benjamin publicly accused New York GOP Chairman Sandy Treadwell and Governor George Pataki of trying to muscle him out of the Senate race and undermine the democratic process. Many Republican voters were upset when Benjamin was denied the chance to engage in a primary. Benjamin also had significant advantages over Mills in both fundraising and organization. Schumer won the largest victory ever recorded for a candidate running statewide in New York against Mills, carrying all but one of the state's counties.

New York's Democratic tilt also continued into 2010, even when Democrats were suffering heavy losses all around the country. Chuck Schumer easily defeated Jay Townsend to win a third term in the U.S. Senate with 66 percent of the vote. With both Senate seats up in New York, the media was more focused on the Class I seat because when Kirsten Gillibrand was first appointed in 2009, she initially looked very vulnerable due to her A+ rating from the NRA from when she was representing a rural upstate district. That rating was not well received by downstate residents when she was first appointed to the Senate. Then Gillibrand immediately changed her position on the issue of gun control after she was appointed to satisfy the concerns from downstate residents. She then went on to win the special election easily with 62 percent of the vote in 2010. In 2012, Gillibrand was re-elected in a landslide with more than 72% of the vote, the highest statewide vote share ever received by a senatorial candidate in New York State.

=== Presidential elections ===
United States presidential election results for New York
Year	Republican / Whig		Democratic		Third party(ies)	
Year	No.	%	No.	%	No.	%
1828	131,563	48.55%	139,412	51.45%	0	0.00%
1832	154,896	47.90%	168,497	52.10%	0	0.00%
1836	138,548	45.37%	166,795	54.63%	0	0.00%
1840	226,001	51.18%	212,733	48.18%	2,809	0.64%
1844	232,482	47.85%	237,588	48.90%	15,812	3.25%
1848	218,583	47.94%	114,319	25.07%	123,042	26.99%
1852	234,882	44.97%	262,083	50.18%	25,329	4.85%
1856	276,004	46.27%	195,878	32.84%	124,604	20.89%
1860	362,646	53.71%	312,510	46.29%	0	0.00%
1864	368,735	50.46%	361,986	49.54%	0	0.00%
1868	419,888	49.41%	429,883	50.59%	0	0.00%
1872	440,738	53.23%	387,282	46.77%	0	0.00%
1876	489,207	48.17%	521,949	51.40%	4,347	0.43%
1880	555,544	50.32%	534,511	48.42%	13,890	1.26%
1884	562,005	48.15%	563,154	48.25%	42,010	3.60%
1888	650,338	49.28%	635,965	48.19%	33,445	2.53%
1892	609,350	45.58%	654,868	48.99%	72,575	5.43%
1896	819,838	57.58%	551,369	38.72%	52,669	3.70%
1900	822,013	53.10%	678,462	43.83%	47,567	3.07%
1904	859,533	53.13%	683,981	42.28%	74,256	4.59%
1908	870,070	53.11%	667,468	40.74%	100,812	6.15%
1912	455,487	28.68%	655,573	41.27%	477,255	30.05%
1916	879,238	51.53%	759,426	44.51%	67,641	3.96%
1920	1,871,167	64.56%	781,238	26.95%	246,108	8.49%
1924	1,820,058	55.76%	950,796	29.13%	493,085	15.11%
1928	2,193,344	49.79%	2,089,863	47.44%	122,419	2.78%
1932	1,937,963	41.33%	2,534,959	54.07%	215,692	4.60%
1936	2,180,670	38.97%	3,293,222	58.85%	122,506	2.19%
1940	3,027,478	47.95%	3,251,918	51.50%	34,501	0.55%
1944	2,987,647	47.30%	3,304,238	52.31%	24,932	0.39%
1948	2,841,163	45.98%	2,780,204	45.00%	557,135	9.02%
1952	3,952,815	55.45%	3,104,601	43.55%	70,825	0.99%
1956	4,340,340	61.19%	2,750,769	38.78%	2,227	0.03%
1960	3,446,419	47.27%	3,830,085	52.53%	14,575	0.20%
1964	2,243,559	31.31%	4,913,156	68.56%	9,300	0.13%
1968	3,007,932	44.30%	3,378,470	49.76%	403,664	5.94%
1972	4,192,778	58.54%	2,951,084	41.21%	17,968	0.25%
1976	3,100,791	47.45%	3,389,558	51.87%	44,071	0.67%
1980	2,893,831	46.66%	2,728,372	43.99%	579,756	9.35%
1984	3,664,763	53.84%	3,119,609	45.83%	22,438	0.33%
1988	3,081,871	47.52%	3,347,882	51.62%	55,930	0.86%
1992	2,346,649	33.88%	3,444,450	49.73%	1,135,826	16.40%
1996	1,933,492	30.61%	3,756,177	59.47%	626,460	9.92%
2000	2,405,676	35.22%	4,113,791	60.22%	311,711	4.56%
2004	2,962,567	40.08%	4,314,280	58.36%	115,107	1.56%
2008	2,752,771	36.03%	4,804,945	62.88%	83,232	1.09%
2012	2,490,496	35.17%	4,485,877	63.35%	105,163	1.49%
2016	2,819,557	36.51%	4,556,142	59.00%	346,096	4.48%
2020	3,251,997	37.67%	5,244,886	60.76%	135,372	1.57%
2024	3,579,519	43.10%	4,619,543	55.62%	105,827	1.27%

Throughout most of the 20th century, New York was a powerful swing state, forcing presidential candidates to invest a large amount of money and time campaigning there. New York State gave small margins of victory to Democrats John F. Kennedy in 1960, Hubert Humphrey in 1968, Jimmy Carter in 1976 and Michael Dukakis in 1988, as well as Republicans Herbert Hoover in 1928, Thomas Dewey in 1948 and Ronald Reagan in 1980. Until the 1970 United States census, it had the most votes in the U.S. Electoral College.

Today, although New York is still the fourth largest prize in the Electoral College with 28 votes, it is usually considered an uncontested "blue state"—meaning that it is presumed safe for the Democrats. The last time a Republican made a serious effort in the state was George H. W. Bush in 1988. Since 1992, the national Republican Party has effectively ceded New York to the Democrats. John Kerry won New York State by 18 percentage points in 2004, while Al Gore won by an even greater 25-point margin in New York State in 2000, giving Gore his second-highest total in the nation. Bill Clinton twice scored his third-best performance in New York in 1992 and 1996. In the 2008 presidential election Barack Obama carried New York with 62.9% of the vote, making it the third most Democratic state in that election, surpassed only by Hawaii and Vermont, as well as the District of Columbia. In 2012, Obama carried New York by an even greater margin, taking 63.4% of the vote to Republican Mitt Romney's 35.2%, again making it the third most Democratic state in the nation.

Even in the days when New York was considered a swing state, it had a slight Democratic lean. It has only supported a Republican for president six times since the Great Depression—in 1948, 1952, 1956, 1972, 1980 and 1984. Republicans have to do reasonably well in Buffalo, Syracuse, and Rochester while holding down their deficits in New York City to have a realistic chance of carrying the state. New York has not voted Republican since Ronald Reagan won 54% of the vote in the 1984 election.

== See also ==
- 2026 New York state elections

=== Statewide elections ===
- New York gubernatorial elections
- New York Attorney General elections
- New York Comptroller elections
- United States senators from New York

=== Local elections ===
- New York City mayoral elections

=== Topics ===
- Political party strength in New York
- Politics of New York
- Electoral reform in New York
- Voting technology in New York State

== Works cited ==
- Zimmerman, Joseph F. (2008). The Government and Politics of New York State (2nd ed.). SUNY Press. ISBN 978-0-7914-7435-8.
- Becker, Carl (1960). The History of Political Parties in the Province of New York 1760-1776. University of Wisconsin Press. ISBN 0553014161.
