= 2006 New York State Comptroller election =

- November 7, 2006

Candidate	Alan Hevesi	Christopher Callaghan
Party	Democratic	Republican
Popular vote	2,349,578	1,612,270
Percentage	56.82%	38.99%
- County results Hevesi: 40–50% 50–60% 70–80% 80–90% Callaghan: 40–50% 50–60% 60–70%
Comptroller before election
Alan Hevesi
Democratic
Elected Comptroller
Alan Hevesi
Democratic

The 2006 New York Comptroller election took place on November 7, 2006. Incumbent Democrat Alan Hevesi won against Republican challenger Chris Callaghan. Hevesi was plagued by scandals during the campaign involving misuse of state funds, and resigned a few days before his second term would have begun.

== Democratic primary ==
=== Nominee ===
Alan Hevesi was the incumbent state comptroller. A Democrat and former professor, Hevesi was first elected in 2002. He previously served two terms as New York City Comptroller from 1994 to 2002, when he was term-limited out of the office. At the time of the election, he was being investigated for using a state employee as a chauffeur for his wife and failing to keep records or reimburse the state of New York by the Albany County District Attorney.

== Republican primary ==
=== Nominee ===
Christopher Callaghan, the Republican candidate, served as the Treasurer of Saratoga County, New York from 1997 to 2006. He was first appointed to the position by governor George Pataki in 1997, and elected to a full term later that year. He was re-elected twice.

== Third parties ==
=== Declared ===
- Julia Willebrand (Green), educator and peace activist
- John Cain (Libertarian), insurance broker
- Willie Cotton (Socialist Workers), journalist

=== Disqualified ===
- Michael Cronmiller (Right to Life)

== General election ==
=== Campaign ===
On October 12, 2006, Albany County District Attorney David Soares' office announced they were investigating Hevesi over claims that he hired a public employee to chauffeur his wife. Eleven days later, the New York State Ethics Commission deemed Hevesi's actions in violation of state law.

On October 26, Democratic gubernatorial candidate Eliot Spitzer withdrew his endorsement of Hevesi, saying that "[r]ecent developments in the Comptroller's race are deeply troubling. The outcome of the Ethics Commission investigation presents information that compromises Alan Hevesi's ability to fulfill his responsibilities." On November 4, Hevesi was ordered to pay an additional $90,000.

=== Endorsements ===
Christopher Callaghan

Newspapers and media

- The New York Post
- Times Herald-Record
- New York Sun
- Poughkeepsie Journal
- Newsday
- The New York Times
- The Brooklyn Paper
- Troy Record
- Syracuse Post Standard
Alan Hevesi

Newspapers and media

- New York Daily News

=== Polling ===
Source	Date	Alan Hevesi (D)	Chris Callaghan (R)
Quinnipiac	November 6, 2006	50%	38%
Marist	November 3, 2006	48%	36%
Siena	November 3, 2006	39%	35%
NY1/Newsday	November 2, 2006	48%	38%
Marist	October 27, 2006	50%	38%
Siena	October 26, 2006	39%	39%^{†}
Marist	October 20, 2006	62%	22%
Quinnipiac	October 18, 2006	54%	27%
Siena	October 16, 2006	52%	25%
Zogby	October 10, 2006	42%	23%
Quinnipiac	October 4, 2006	59%	21%
Marist	September 28, 2006	57%	27%
Marist	September 8, 2006	57%	28%
Marist	August 2006	60%	27%
Marist	July 2006	57%	29%

^{†} Of voters polled in Albany, Rensselaer, Saratoga, and Schenectady counties.

=== Results ===
General election results
Party	Candidate	Votes	%
Democratic	Alan Hevesi	2,095,864	50.96%
Independence	Alan Hevesi	127,293	3.08%
Working Families	Alan Hevesi	126,421	3.06%
Total	Alan Hevesi (incumbent)	2,349,578	56.82%
Republican	Christopher Callaghan	1,405,843	34.00%
Conservative	Christopher Callaghan	206,427	4.99%
Total	Christopher Callaghan	1,612,270	38.99%
Green	Julia Willebrand	117,908	2.85%
Libertarian	John Cain	40,472	0.98%
Socialist Workers	Willie Cotton	14,745	0.36%
Total votes		4,134,973	100%
Democratic hold			

== See also ==
- Election results, New York Comptroller
- New York gubernatorial election, 2006
- New York United States Senate election, 2006
- New York attorney general election, 2006

Preceded by 2002	New York Comptroller election 2006	Succeeded by 2010
