= New York gubernatorial elections =

There have been 91 gubernatorial elections in the state of New York since 1777, with the most recent being held on November 8, 2022. The next election is scheduled to be held on November 3, 2026.

== Overview ==
Originally the term for governor of New York was three years long and began on July 1, with the election being held in the last week of April or May 1. In 1817, following the resignation of Daniel D. Tompkins after serving only eight months of his term, there was a new election, since the 1777 Constitution did not give the lieutenant governor the right to succeed to the governor's office, and DeWitt Clinton was elected for a whole three-year-term. The New York State Constitutional Convention of 1821 reduced the term to two years – beginning on January 1 and ending on December 31 – and moved the election to the Tuesday after the first Monday in November. Due to this measure, DeWitt Clinton's own second term was cut short by half a year. Beginning with the election in 1876, the term was increased to three years again, beginning with the election in 1894, it was reduced to two years, and since the election in 1938, it has had its present duration of four years.

Although the candidates for lieutenant governor have always run on tickets with the governor's candidates, until the election of 1950 they were elected on separate ballots, so on several occasions (1826, 1846, 1850, 1906, and 1924) the governor and his lieutenant were elected on opposing tickets. After a bill passed in 2025, governor candidates also pick their choice for lieutenant governor and primary with them.

Of the 91 total elections, the incumbent has only lost re-election in 15 of them.

== Recent elections ==
=== 2022 ===
2022 election results by county

2022 New York gubernatorial election
Party	Candidate	Votes	%
Democratic	Kathy Hochul (incumbent)	3,034,801	53.20
Republican	Lee Zeldin	2,705,908	46.80
Total votes		5,750,373	100.00
Majority		328,893	5.72
Democratic hold			

=== 2018 ===
2018 election results by county

2018 New York gubernatorial election
Party	Candidate	Votes	%
Democratic	Andrew Cuomo (incumbent)	3,635,340	59.62
Republican	Marc Molinaro	2,207,602	36.21
Green	Howie Hawkins	103,946	1.70
Libertarian	Larry Sharpe	95,033	1.56
SAM	Stephanie Miner	55,441	0.91
Total votes		6,097,362	100.00
Majority		1,427,738	23.42
Democratic hold			

=== 2014 ===
2014 election results by county

2014 New York gubernatorial election
Party	Candidate	Votes	%
Democratic	Andrew Cuomo (incumbent)	2,069,480	54.28
Republican	Rob Astorino	1,537,077	40.31
Green	Howie Hawkins	184,419	4.84
Libertarian	Michael McDermott	16,769	0.44
Sapient	Steven Cohn	4,963	0.13
Total votes		3,812,708	100.00
Majority		532,403	13.96
Democratic hold			

=== 2010 ===
2010 election results by county

2010 New York gubernatorial election
Party	Candidate	Votes	%
Democratic	Andrew Cuomo	2,910,876	62.56
Republican	Carl Paladino	1,547,857	33.26
Green	Howie Hawkins	59,906	1.29
Libertarian	Warren Redlich	48,359	1.04
Rent Is Too Damn High	Jimmy McMillan	41,129	0.88
Freedom	Charles Barron	24,571	0.53
Anti-Prohibition	Kristin M. Davis	20,421	0.44
Total votes		4,653,119	100.00
Majority		1,363,019	29.29
Democratic hold			

=== 2006 ===
2006 election results by county

2006 New York gubernatorial election
Party	Candidate	Votes	%
Democratic	Eliot Spitzer	3,086,709	69.56
Republican	John Faso	1,274,335	28.72
Green	Malachy McCourt	42,166	0.95
Libertarian	John Clifton	14,736	0.33
Rent Is Too Damn High	Jimmy McMillan	13,355	0.30
Socialist Workers	Maura DeLuca	5,919	0.13
Total votes		4,437,220	100.00
Majority		1,812,374	40.84
Democratic gain from Republican			

=== 2002 ===
2002 election results by county

2002 New York gubernatorial election
Party	Candidate	Votes	%
Republican	George Pataki (incumbent)	2,262,255	49.40
Democratic	Carl McCall	1,534,064	33.50
Independence	B. Thomas Golisano	654,016	14.28
Right to Life	Gerard Cronin	44,195	0.97
Green	Stanley Aronowitz	41,797	0.91
Marijuana Reform	Thomas K. Leighton	21,977	0.48
Liberal	Andrew Cuomo	15,761	0.34
Libertarian	Scott Jeffrey	5,013	0.11
Total votes		4,579,078	100.00
Majority		728,191	15.90
Republican hold			

== Older elections ==
=== 1966-1998 ===
Gubernatorial elections under the State Constitution of 1938. The term is four years.

==== 1998 ====
1998 election results by county

1998 New York gubernatorial election (Note: 4,985,932 ballots were cast in this election. Out of them, 250,696 were declared blank, void or missing.)
Party	Candidate	Votes	%
Republican	George Pataki (incumbent)	2,571,991	54.32
Democratic	Peter Vallone, Sr.	1,570,317	33.16
Independence	Tom Golisano	364,056	7.69
Liberal	Betsy McCaughey	77,915	1.65
Right to Life	Michael Reynolds	56,683	1.20
Green	Al Lewis	52,533	1.11
Marijuana Reform	Thomas K. Leighton	24,788	0.52
Unity	Mary A. France	9,692	0.20
Libertarian	Chris Garvey	4,722	0.10
Socialist Workers	Al Duncan	2,539	0.05
Total votes		4,735,236	100.00
Majority		1,001,674	21.15
Republican hold			

==== 1994 ====
1994 election results by county

1994 New York gubernatorial election
Party	Candidate	Votes	%
Republican	George Pataki	2,538,702	48.79
Democratic	Mario Cuomo (incumbent)	2,364,904	45.45
Independence	Tom Golisano	217,490	4.18
Right to Life	Robert T. Walsh	67,750	1.30
Libertarian	Robert L. Schulz	9,506	0.18
Socialist Workers	Lawrence Lane	5,410	0.10
Total votes		5,203,762	100.00
Majority		173,798	3.34
Republican gain from Democratic			

==== 1990 ====
1990 election results by county

1990 New York gubernatorial election
Party	Candidate	Votes	%
Democratic	Mario Cuomo (incumbent)	2,157,087	53.17
Republican	Pierre Rinfret	865,948	21.35
Conservative	Herbert London	827,614	20.40
Right to Life	Louis P. Wein	137,804	3.40
New Alliance	Lenora Fulani	31,089	0.77
Libertarian	W. Gary Johnson	24,611	0.61
Socialist Workers	Craig Gannon	12,743	0.31
Total votes		4,056,896	100.00
Majority		1,291,139	31.83
Democratic hold			

==== 1986 ====
1986 election results by county

1986 New York gubernatorial election
Party	Candidate	Votes	%
Democratic	Mario Cuomo (incumbent)	2,775,045	64.63
Republican	Andrew O'Rourke	1,363,968	31.77
Right to Life	Denis Dillon	130,827	3.05
New Alliance	Lenora Fulani	24,135	0.56
Total votes		4,293,975	100.00
Majority		1,411,077	32.86
Democratic hold			

==== 1982 ====
1982 election results by county

1982 New York gubernatorial election
Party	Candidate	Votes	%
Democratic	Mario Cuomo	2,675,213	50.91
Republican	Lewis Lehrman	2,494,827	47.48
Right to Life	Robert J. Bohner	52,356	1.00
Libertarian	John H. Northrup	16,913	0.32
Unity	Jane Benedict	6,353	0.12
New Alliance	Nancy Ross	5,277	0.10
Socialist Workers	Diane Wang	3,766	0.07
Write-in		186	0.00
Total votes		5,254,891	100.00
Majority		180,386	3.43
Democratic hold			

==== 1978 ====
1978 election results by county

1978 New York gubernatorial election
Party	Candidate	Votes	%
Democratic	Hugh Carey (incumbent)	2,429,272	50.95
Republican	Perry Duryea	2,156,404	45.22
Right to Life	Mary Jane Tobin	130,193	2.73
Libertarian	Gary Greenberg	18,990	0.40
Socialist Workers	Dianne M. Feeley	12,987	0.27
Communist	Jarvis Tyner	11,400	0.24
U.S. Labor	Paul Gallagher	9,073	0.19
Total votes		4,768,319	100.00
Majority		272,868	5.72
Democratic hold			

==== 1974 ====
1974 election results by county

1974 New York gubernatorial election
Party	Candidate	Votes	%
Democratic	Hugh Carey	3,028,503	57.22
Republican	Malcolm Wilson (incumbent)	2,219,667	41.94
Courage	Wayne S. Amato	12,459	0.24
Libertarian	Jerome Tuccille	10,503	0.20
Socialist Workers	Derrick Morrison	8,857	0.17
Communist	Jose A. Ristorucci	5,232	0.10
Socialist Labor	John Emanuel	4,574	0.09
U.S. Labor	Anton Chaitkin	3,151	0.06
Total votes		5,292,946	100.00
Majority		808,836	15.28
Democratic gain from Republican			

==== 1970 ====
1970 election results by county

1970 New York gubernatorial election (Note: Prior to 2018, this election had the highest number of votes ever received by any Governor of NY.)
Party	Candidate	Votes	%
Republican	Nelson Rockefeller (incumbent)	3,151,432	52.41
Democratic	Arthur Goldberg	2,421,426	40.27
Conservative	Paul Adams	422,514	7.03
Communist	Rasheed Storey	7,760	0.13
Socialist Workers	Clifton DeBerry	5,766	0.10
Socialist Labor	Stephen Emery	3,963	0.07
Total votes		6,012,861	100.00
Majority		730,006	12.14
Republican hold			

==== 1966 ====
1966 election results by county

1966 New York gubernatorial election
Party	Candidate	Votes	%
Republican	Nelson Rockefeller (incumbent)	2,690,626	44.61
Democratic	Frank D. O'Connor	2,298,363	38.11
Conservative	Paul Adams	510,023	8.46
Liberal	Franklin Delano Roosevelt Jr.	507,234	8.41
Socialist Labor	Milton Herder	12,730	0.21
Socialist Workers	Judith White	12,506	0.21
Total votes		6,031,482	100.00
Majority		392,263	6.50
Republican hold			

=== 1938-1962 ===
==== 1962 ====
1962 election results by county

1962 New York gubernatorial election
Party	Candidate	Votes	%
Republican	Nelson Rockefeller (incumbent)	3,081,587	53.08
Democratic	Robert M. Morgenthau	2,552,418	43.97
Conservative	David H. Jaquith	141,877	2.44
Socialist Workers	Richard Garza	19,698	0.34
Socialist Labor	Eric Hass	9,762	0.17
Total votes		5,805,342	100.00
Majority		529,169	9.12
Republican hold			

==== 1958 ====
1958 election results by county

1958 New York gubernatorial election
Party	Candidate	Votes	%
Republican	Nelson Rockefeller	3,126,929	54.74
Democratic	W. Averell Harriman (incumbent)	2,553,895	44.71
Independent-Socialist	John T. McManus	31,658	0.55
Total votes		5,712,482	100.00
Majority		573,034	10.03
Republican gain from Democratic			

==== 1954 ====
1954 New York gubernatorial election
Party	Candidate	Votes	%
Democratic	W. Averell Harriman	2,560,738	49.61
Republican	Irving Ives	2,549,613	49.40
American Labor	John T. McManus	46,886	0.91
Socialist Workers	David L. Weiss	2,617	0.05
Industrial Government	Nathan Karp	1,720	0.03
Total votes		5,161,574	100.00
Majority		11,125	0.22
Democratic gain from Republican			

==== 1950 ====
1950 New York gubernatorial election
Party	Candidate	Votes	%
Republican	Thomas E. Dewey (incumbent)	2,819,523	53.11
Democratic	Walter A. Lynch	2,246,855	42.32
American Labor	John T. McManus	221,966	4.18
Socialist Workers	Michael Bartell	13,274	0.25
Socialist Labor	Eric Hass	7,254	0.14
Total votes		5,308,872	100.00
Majority		572,668	10.79
Republican hold			

==== 1946 ====
1946 election results by county

1946 New York gubernatorial election
Party	Candidate	Votes	%
Republican	Thomas E. Dewey (incumbent)	2,825,633	56.92
Democratic	James M. Mead	2,138,482	43.08
Total votes		4,964,115	100.00
Majority		687,151	13.84
Republican hold			

==== 1942 ====
1942 election results by county

1942 New York gubernatorial election
Party	Candidate	Votes	%
Republican	Thomas E. Dewey	2,148,546	52.10
Democratic	John J. Bennett Jr.	1,501,039	36.40
American Labor	Dean Alfange	403,626	9.79
Communist	Israel Amter	45,220	1.10
Socialist	Coleman B. Cheney	21,911	0.53
Industrial Government	Aaron M. Orange	3,496	0.09
Total votes		4,123,838	100.00
Majority		647,507	15.70
Republican gain from Democratic			

==== 1938 ====
1938 election results by county

1938 New York gubernatorial election
Party	Candidate	Votes	%
Democratic	Herbert H. Lehman (incumbent)	2,391,286	50.38
Republican	Thomas E. Dewey	2,326,982	49.02
Socialist	Norman Thomas	24,980	0.53
Industrial Government	Aaron M. Orange	3,516	0.07
Total votes		4,746,764	100.00
Majority		64,304	1.35
Democratic hold			

=== 1894-1936 ===
Gubernatorial elections under the State Constitution of 1894. The term was two years.

1936 general election results
Governor candidate	Running mate	Party	Votes	
Herbert H. Lehman	M. William Bray	Democratic, American Labor	2,970,575	53.45%
William F. Bleakley	Ralph K. Robertson	Republican	2,450,104	44.09%
Harry W. Laidler	Herman J. Hahn	Socialist	96,233	1.73%
Robert Minor	Julian S. Sawyer	Communist	40,406	0.73%

1934 general election results
Governor candidate	Running mate	Party	Votes	
Herbert H. Lehman	M. William Bray	Democratic	2,201,729	58.01%
Robert Moses	Fred James Douglas	Republican	1,393,638	36.72%
Charles Solomon	Herman Kobbe	Socialist	126,580	3.34%
Israel Amter	William J. Burroughs	Communist	45,878	1.21%
William F. Varney	James F. Luckey	Law Preservation	20,449	0.54%
Aaron M. Orange	Emil F. Teichert	Socialist Labor	7,225	0.19%

1932 general election results
Governor candidate	Running mate	Party	Votes	
Herbert H. Lehman	M. William Bray	Democratic	2,659,519	56.69%
William J. Donovan	F. Trubee Davison	Republican	1,812,080	38.62%
Louis Waldman	Charles W. Noonan	Socialist	102,959	2.19%
John F. Vichert	H. Westlake Coon	Law Preservation	83,452	1.78%
Israel Amter	Henry Shepard	Communist	26,407	0.56%
Aaron M. Orange	Emil F. Teichert	Socialist Labor	7,233	0.15%

1930 general election results
Governor candidate	Running mate	Party	Votes	
Franklin D. Roosevelt	Herbert H. Lehman	Democratic	1,770,342	56.49%
Charles H. Tuttle	Caleb Howard Baumes	Republican	1,045,341	33.36%
Robert Paris Carroll	(none)	Law Preservation	190,666	6.08%
Louis Waldman	Elizabeth C. Roth	Socialist	100,444	3.21%
William Z. Foster	J. Louis Engdahl	Communist	18,034	0.58%
Jeremiah D. Crowley	Charles M. Carlson	Socialist Labor	9,096	0.29%

1928 general election results
Governor candidate	Running mate	Party	Votes	
Franklin D. Roosevelt	Herbert H. Lehman	Democratic	2,130,193	48.96%
Albert Ottinger	Charles C. Lockwood	Republican	2,104,129	48.36%
Louis Waldman	Herman J. Hahn	Socialist	101,859	2.34%
William F. Dunne	Franklin P. Brill	Workers	10,741	0.25%
Charles H. Corregan	John E. DeLee	Socialist Labor	4,213	0.10%

1926 general election results
Governor candidate	Running mate	Party	Votes	
Alfred E. Smith	Edwin Corning	Democratic	1,523,813	52.13%
Ogden L. Mills	Seymour Lowman	Republican	1,276,137	43.80%
Jacob Panken	August Claessens	Socialist	83,481	2.87%
Charles E. Manierre	Ella L. McCarthy	Prohibition	21,285	0.73%
Benjamin Gitlow	Franklin P. Brill	Workers	5,507	0.19%
Jeremiah D. Crowley	John E. DeLee	Socialist Labor	3,553	0.12%

1924 general election results
Governor candidate	Running mate	Party	Votes	
Alfred E. Smith	George R. Lunn	Democratic	1,627,111	49.96%
Theodore Roosevelt Jr.	Seymour Lowman	Republican	1,518,552	46.63%
Norman Mattoon Thomas	Charles Solomon	Socialist	99,854	3.07%
James P. Cannon	Franklin P. Brill	Workers	6,395	0.20%
Frank E. Passanno	Milton Weinberger	Socialist Labor	4,931	0.15%

Note: This was the last time the running mate of the elected governor was defeated, Democrat Smith having Republican Lowman as lieutenant for the duration of this term.

1922 general election results
Governor candidate	Running mate	Party	Votes	
Alfred E. Smith	George R. Lunn	Democratic	1,397,670	55.22%
Nathan L. Miller	William J. Donovan	Republican	1,011,725	39.98%
Edward F. Cassidy	Theresa B. Wiley	Socialist, Farmer–Labor	108,136	4.27%
George K. Hinds	William C. Ramsdell	Prohibition	9,561	0.38%
Jeremiah D. Crowley	John E. DeLee	Socialist Labor	3,799	0.15%

1920 general election results
Governor candidate	Running mate	Party	Votes	
Nathan L. Miller	Jeremiah Wood	Republican	1,335,878	46.58%
Alfred E. Smith	George R. Fitts	Democratic	1,261,812	44.00%
Joseph D. Cannon	Jessie Wallace Hughan	Socialist	159,804	5.57%
Dudley Field Malone	Robert E. Haffey	Farmer–Labor	69,908	2.44%
George F. Thompson	Edward G. Dietrich	Prohibition	35,509	1.24%
John P. Quinn	Jeremiah D. Crowley	Social Labor	5,015	0.17%

Notes:

- List of candidates, in NYT on September 13, 1920
- List of candidates, in NYT on October 27, 1920

1918 general election results
Governor candidate	Running mate	Party	Votes	
Alfred E. Smith	Harry C. Walker	Democratic	1,009,936	47.37%
Charles S. Whitman	Edward Schoeneck (Republican), Mamie W. Colvin (Prohibition)	Republican, Prohibition	995,094	46.68%
Charles Wesley Ervin	Ella Reeve Bloor	Socialist	121,705	5.71%
Olive M. Johnson	August Gillhaus	Socialist Labor	5,183	0.24%

Notes:

- This was the first time women voted for governor of New York, and Alfred E. Smith was the first governor elected with more than 1 million votes.
- Election result in NYT on December 31, 1918

1916 general election results
Governor candidate	Running mate	Party	Votes	
Charles S. Whitman	Edward Schoeneck (Republican), L. Bradley Dorr (Progressive), Thomas J. Kreuzer (American)	Republican, Progressive, American	850,020	52.63%
Samuel Seabury	Thomas J. Kreuzer	Democratic	686.862	42.53%
Algernon Lee	Stephen J. Mahoney	Socialist	52,560	3.25%
Charles E. Welch	Clarence Z. Spriggs	Prohibition	21,773	1.35%
Jeremiah D. Crowley	Boris Reinstein	Socialist Labor	3,847	0.24%

1914 general election results
Governor candidate	Running mate	Party	Votes	
Charles S. Whitman	Edward Schoeneck	Republican	686,701	47.69%
Martin H. Glynn	Thomas B. Lockwood	Democratic, Independence League	541,269	37.59%
William Sulzer	Charles E. Welch	American, Prohibition	126,270	8.77%
Frederick Morgan Davenport	Chauncey J. Hamlin	Progressive	45,586	3.17%
Gustave Adolph Strebel	Stephen J. Mahoney	Socialist	37,793	2.62%
James F. Hunter	Jeremiah D. Crowley	Socialist Labor	2,350	0.16%

Note: William Sulzer had been elected governor as a Democrat at the previous election, but was impeached. Martin Glynn had been elected Lt. Gov and succeeded to the governorship upon Sulzer's impeachment.

1912 general election results
Governor candidate	Running mate	Party	Votes	
William Sulzer	Martin H. Glynn	Democratic	649,559	41.46%
Job E. Hedges	James W. Wadsworth Jr.	Republican	444,105	28.35%
Oscar Solomon Straus	Frederick Morgan Davenport	Independence League, Progressive	393,183	25.10%
Charles Edward Russell	Gustave A. Strebel	Socialist	56,917	3.63%
T. Alexander MacNicholl	Clark Allis	Prohibition	18,990	1.21%
John Hall	Jeremiah D. Crowley	Socialist Labor	3,792	0.24%

1910 general election results
Governor candidate	Running mate	Party	Votes	
John Alden Dix	Thomas F. Conway	Democratic	689,700	48.00%
Henry L. Stimson	Edward Schoeneck	Republican	622,299	43.31%
Charles Edward Russell	Gustave A. Strebel	Socialist	48,529	3.38%
John J. Hopper	William Randolph Hearst	Independence League	48,470	3.37%
T. Alexander MacNicholl	Calvin McCarthy	Prohibition	22,295	1.55%
Frank E. Passanno	James F. Hunter	Socialist Labor	5,717	0.40%

Note: election result, in NYT on December 16, 1910

1908 general election results
Governor candidate	Running mate	Party	Votes	
Charles Evans Hughes	Horace White	Republican	804,651	49.08%
Lewis S. Chanler	John Alden Dix	Democratic	735,189	44.84%
Clarence J. Shearn	Daniel W. Finnimore	Independence League	43,212	2.64%
Joshua Wanhope	Gustave A. Strebel	Socialist	33,994	2.07%
George E. Stockwell	Marshall A. Hudson	Prohibition	18,802	1.15%
Leander A. Armstrong	Frank E. Passanno	Socialist Labor	3,655	0.22%

1906 general election results
Governor candidate	Running mate	Party	Votes	
Charles Evans Hughes	M. Linn Bruce	Republican	749,002	50.52%
William Randolph Hearst	Lewis S. Chanler	Democratic, Independence League	691,105	46.62%
John C. Chase	Gustave A. Strebel	Socialist	21,751	1.47%
Henry M. Randall	Freeman H. Bettys	Prohibition	15,985	1.08%
Thomas H. Jackson	Frank E. Passanno	Socialist Labor	4,624	0.31%

1904 general election results
Governor candidate	Running mate	Party	Votes	
Frank W. Higgins	M. Linn Bruce	Republican	813,264	50.27%
D. Cady Herrick	Francis B. Harrison	Democratic	732,704	45.29%
Thomas Pendergast	Charles R. Bach	Social Democratic	36,259	2.24%
John McKee	Alden W. Young	Prohibition	20,568	1.27%
Daniel De Leon	Boris Reinstein	Socialist Labor	8,976	0.55%
Alfred J. Boulton	Charles Spaulding	People's Party	6,015	0.37%

1902 general election results
Governor candidate	Running mate	Party	Votes	
Benjamin B. Odell Jr.	Frank W. Higgins	Republican	665,150	48.09%
Bird Sim Coler	Charles N. Bulger	Democratic	656,347	47.45%
Benjamin Hanford	William Thurston Brown	Social Democratic	23,400	1.69%
Alfred Lee Manierre	John A. Hartman	Prohibition	20,490	1.48%
Daniel De Leon		Socialist Labor	15,886	1.15%
Edgar Lee Ryder	J. C. Corbin	Liberal Democratic	1,894	0.14%

1900 general election results
Governor candidate	Running mate	Party	Votes	
Benjamin B. Odell Jr.	Timothy L. Woodruff	Republican	804,859	51.97%
John B. Stanchfield	William F. Mackey	Democratic	693,733	44.80%
William T. Wardwell	Albert J. Rumsey	Prohibition	22,704	1.47%
Charles H. Corregan	Leander A. Armstrong	Socialist Labor	13,762	0.89%
Benjamin Hanford	William Butscher	Social Democratic	13,493	0.87%

1898 general election results
Governor candidate	Running mate	Party	Votes	
Theodore Roosevelt	Timothy L. Woodruff	Republican	661,707	49.02%
Augustus Van Wyck	Elliott Danforth	Democratic	643,921	47.70%
Benjamin Hanford	Leander A. Armstrong	Socialist Labor	23,860	1.77%
John Kline	John A. Sayles	Prohibition	18,383	1.36%
Theodore Bacon	Thomas M. Osborne	Citizens Union	2,103	0.16%

1896 general election results
Governor candidate	Running mate	Party	Votes	
Frank S. Black	Timothy L. Woodruff	Republican	787,516	52.63%
Wilbur F. Porter	Frederick C. Schraub	Democratic, People's	574,524	40.33%
Daniel G. Griffin	Frederick W. Hinrichs	National Democratic	26,698	1.87%
Howard Balkam	Frederick Bennets	Socialist Labor	18,362	1.29%
William W. Smith	Charles E. Latimer	Prohibition	17,419	1.22%

Note: The majority faction of the Democratic Party were then known as "Silver Democrats", and the "National Democrats" were the "Gold Democrats".

1894 general election results
Governor candidate	Running mate	Party	Votes	
Levi P. Morton	Charles T. Saxton	Republican	673,818	47.69%
David B. Hill	Daniel N. Lockwood	Democratic	517,710	40.79%
Everett P. Wheeler	Daniel N. Lockwood	Democratic Reform	27,202	2.14%
Francis E. Baldwin	Justus Miller	Prohibition	23,525	1.85%
Charles H. Matchett	William F. Steer	Socialist Labor	15,868	1.25%
Charles B. Matthews	Robert C. Hewson	People's	11,049	0.87%

Notes:

- Wheeler was nominated by the "Democratic Reform Association of Brooklyn" who were opposed to the regular Democrats led by Hugh McLaughlin.
- Election result in NYT on December 15, 1894

=== 1876-1891 ===
Gubernatorial elections under the State Constitution of 1846, amended in 1874. The term was three years.

1891 general election results
Governor candidate	Running mate	Party	Votes	
Roswell P. Flower	William F. Sheehan	Democratic	582,893	50.13%
Jacob S. Fassett	John W. Vrooman	Republican	534,956	46.00%
Joseph W. Bruce	George W. Hallock (d. 1895)	Prohibition	30,353	2.61%
Daniel DeLeon	Frank Gesser	Socialist Labor	14,651	1.26%

1888 general election results
Governor candidate	Running mate	Party	Votes	
David B. Hill	Edward F. Jones	Democratic	650,464	49.45%
Warner Miller	Stephen Van Rensselaer Cruger (Republican), John H. Blakeney (United Labor);	Republican, United Labor Party	631,293	48.00%
W. Martin Jones	George F. Powell	Prohibition	30,215	2.30%
J. Edward Hall	Christian Pattberg	Socialist Labor	3,348	0.25%

1885 general election results
Governor candidate	Running mate	Party	Votes	
David B. Hill	Edward F. Jones	Democratic	501,465	48.93%
Ira Davenport	Joseph Bradford Carr	Republican	490,331	47.85%
Henry Clay Bascom	W. Jennings Demorest	Prohibition	30,867	3.01%
George O. Jones	Lyman W. Gage	National Greenback-Labor	2,130	0.21%

1882 general election results
Governor candidate	Running mate	Party	Votes	
Grover Cleveland	David B. Hill	Democratic	535,318	58.47%
Charles J. Folger	B. Platt Carpenter	Republican	342,464	37.41%
Alphonso A. Hopkins	William H. Boole	Prohibition	25,783	2.82%
Epenetus Howe	James Allen	National Greenback-Labor	11,974	1.31%

1879 general election results
Governor candidate	Running mate	Party	Votes
Alonzo B. Cornell	George Gilbert Hoskins	Republican	418,567
Lucius Robinson	Clarkson N. Potter	Democratic	375,790
John Kelly	Clarkson N. Potter (Tammany Hall), John M. Wieting (Working Men), Robert W. Hume (Jeffersonian Democratic)	Tammany Hall, Working Men, Jeffersonian Democratic	77,566
Harris Lewis	John M. Wieting	Greenback-Labor	20,286
John W. Mears	James H. Bronson	Prohibition	4,437
Caleb Pink	Osborne Ward	Socialist Labor	

- The tickets: NYT on November 3, 1879

1876 general election results
Governor candidate	Running mate	Party	Votes	
Lucius Robinson	William Dorsheimer	Democratic	519,831	51.97%
Edwin D. Morgan	Sherman S. Rogers	Republican	489,371	48.26%
William J. Groo	Albert F. Brown	Prohibition	3,412	0.34%
Richard Montgomery Griffin	Thomas Armstrong	Greenback	1,436	0.14%

- The tickets: NYT on November 2, 1876
- The Greenback convention: NYT on September 27, 1876

=== 1847-1874 ===
Gubernatorial elections under the State Constitution of 1846. The term was two years.

1874 general election results
Governor candidate	Running mate	Party	Votes	
Samuel Jones Tilden	William Dorsheimer	Democratic	416,391	52.43%
John Adams Dix	John Cleveland Robinson	Republican	366,074	46.09%
Myron Holley Clark	James L. Bagg	Prohibition	11,768	1.48%

1872 general election results
Governor candidate	Running mate	Party	Votes	
John Adams Dix	John Cleveland Robinson	Republican	445,801	53.19%
Francis Kernan	Chauncey M. Depew	Democratic, Liberal Republican	392,350	46.81%

1870 general election results
Governor candidate	Running mate	Party	Votes	
John Thompson Hoffman	Allen C. Beach	Democratic	399,490	52.19%
Stewart L. Woodford	Sigismund Kaufman	Republican	366,424	47.84%

The tickets: NYT on October 30, 1870

1868 general election results
Governor candidate	Running mate	Party	Votes	
John Thompson Hoffman	Allen C. Beach	Democratic	439,301	51.64%
John Augustus Griswold	Alonzo B. Cornell	Republican		48.36%

1866 general election results
Governor candidate	Running mate	Party	Votes	
Reuben E. Fenton	Stewart L. Woodford	Republican	366,315	50.96%
John Thompson Hoffman	Robert H. Pruyn	Conservative Union	352,526	49.04%

Note: John T. Hoffman was a Democrat, Robert H. Pruyn a Republican. The "Conservative Union" ticket was nominated by the Democrats in an attempt to attract Republicans, especially Democrats who had joined the Republican Union and remained Republicans after the Civil War, to return to the Democratic Party.

1864 general election results
Governor candidate	Running mate	Party	Votes	
Reuben E. Fenton	Thomas G. Alvord	Republican Union	369,557	50.57%
Horatio Seymour	David R. Floyd-Jones	Democratic	361,264	49.43%

1862 general election results
Governor candidate	Running mate	Party	Votes	
Horatio Seymour	David R. Floyd-Jones	Democratic	306,649	50.89%
James S. Wadsworth	Lyman Tremain	Republican Union	295,897	49.11%

Note:

- Horatio Seymour was the candidate of the Democratic Party that wanted to end the war.
- James Wadsworth was a Republican, Lyman Tremain a pre-war Democrat, nominated by the Republican Union in which the Republican Party was joined by the War Democrats who supported Lincoln and the Union.
- The total of ballots cast were more than 70,000 less than in the previous election because the soldiers in the field were not allowed to vote.

1860 general election results
Governor candidate	Running mate	Party	Votes	
Edwin D. Morgan	Robert Campbell	Republican	358,272	53.24%
William Kelly	William C. Crain	Douglas Democracy	294,812	43.81%
James T. Brady	Henry K. Viele	Breckinridge Democracy	19,841	2.95%

Note:

- William Kelly was the candidate of the majority faction of the Democratic Party which supported Stephen A. Douglas for president.
- James T. Brady was a member of Tammany Hall, nominated by the minority faction of the Democratic Party which supported John C. Breckinridge for president.

1858 general election results
Governor candidate	Running mate	Party	Votes	
Edwin D. Morgan	Robert Campbell	Republican	257,953	45.49%
Amasa J. Parker	John J. Taylor	Democratic	230,513	42.29%
Lorenzo Burrows	Nathaniel S. Benton	American	61,137	11.22%
Gerrit Smith	Sidney A. Beers	Abolitionist	5,470	1.00%

1856 general election results
Governor candidate	Running mate	Party	Votes	
John Alsop King	Henry R. Selden	Republican	264,400	44.52%
Amasa J. Parker	John Vanderbilt	Democratic	198,616	33.44%
Erastus Brooks	Lyman Odell	American	130,870	22.04%

1854 general election results
Governor candidate	Running mate	Party	Votes	
Myron H. Clark	Henry J. Raymond (Whig, Anti-Nebraska, Temperance), Bradford R. Wood (Anti-Rent, Free Democratic)	Whig, Anti-Nebraska, Anti-Rent, Free Democratic, Temperance	156,804	33.38%
Horatio Seymour	William H. Ludlow	Democratic (Soft)	156,495	33.32%
Daniel Ullmann	Gustavus Adolphus Scroggs	American	122,282	26.03%
Greene C. Bronson	Elijah Ford	Democratic (Hard)	33,850	7.21%
William Goodell	Austin Ward	Liberty	289	0.06%

Notes:

- Result: Official State Canvass in NYT on December 21, 1854 (William Goodell's votes were counted among the "scattering votes").
- Myron H. Clark won this election with the lowest percentage ever in NY Gov. elections, nominated by the Whigs (of which party he was a member), and endorsed by the Anti-Nebraska Party (which merged in 1855 with the Whigs to form the Republican Party), the Anti-Rent Party, the "Free Democrats" (the remnants of the Free-Soil Party with radical anti-slavery Democrats), and the supporters of Temperance.
- The "Soft" or "Soft-shell" candidate was the choice of the majority faction of the Democratic Party.
- The American Party was called "Know Nothing" in contemporaneous newspapers.
- The "National Democracy" (a faction of the Democratic Party) were called "Hards" or "Hard-shells" by contemporaneous newspapers.
- Liberty Party convention NYT on September 29, 1854

1852 general election results
Governor candidate	Running mate	Party	Votes	
Horatio Seymour	Sanford E. Church	Democratic	264,121	50.31%
Washington Hunt	William Kent	Whig	241,525	46.01%
Minthorne Tompkins	Seth Merrill Gates	Free Democratic	19,296	3.68%

1850 general election results
Governor candidate	Running mate	Party	Votes	
Washington Hunt	George J. Cornell (Whig); Sanford E. Church (Anti-Rent)	Whig, Anti-Rent	214,614	49.64%
Horatio Seymour	Sanford E. Church	Democratic	214,352	49.57%
William L. Chaplin	Joseph Plumb 1791–1870)	Liberty	3,416	0.79%

1848 general election results
Governor candidate	Running mate	Party	Votes	
Hamilton Fish	George Washington Patterson	Whig	218,776	47.56%
John Adams Dix	Seth Merrill Gates	Democratic (Barnburner), Free Soil	122,811	26.70%
Reuben H. Walworth	Charles O'Conor	Democratic (Hunker)	116,811	25.39%
William Goodell	Robert Anderson	Liberty	1,593	0.35%

1847 special election results
Lieutenant Governor candidate	Party	Votes	
Hamilton Fish	Whig	170,072	52.63%
Nathan Dayton	Democratic	139,623	43.21%
Charles O. Shepard	Liberty, Anti-Rent	13,429	4.16%

Note:

- At the first judicial election under the Constitution of 1846, Addison Gardiner was elected in June 1847 to the Court of Appeals, to take office on July 1, 1847. To fill the vacancy, on September 27, a special election was scheduled by the State Legislature to be held at the annual state election.
- Result Manual of the Corporation of the City of New York (1852)

=== 1822-1846 ===
Gubernatorial elections under the State Constitution of 1821. The term was two years. Until 1840, elections were held during three days beginning on the first Monday in November. Since 1841, until today, all regular elections have been held on the Tuesday after the first Monday in November. The elected candidate takes office on January 1 of the following calendar year.

1846 general election results
Governor candidate	Running mate	Party	Votes	
John Young	Hamilton Fish (Whig); Addison Gardiner (Anti-Rent)	Whig, Anti-Rent	198,878	49.07%
Silas Wright	Addison Gardiner	Democratic	187,306	46.21%
Henry Bradley	William L. Chaplin	Liberty, National Reform	12,844	3.17%
Ogden Edwards	George Folsom	Native American	6,305	1.56%

- Result Manual of the Corporation of the City of New York 1852)

1844 general election results
Governor candidate	Running mate	Party	Votes	
Silas Wright	Addison Gardiner	Democratic	241,090	49.48%
Millard Fillmore	Samuel J. Wilkin	Whig	231,057	47.42%
Alvan Stewart	Charles O. Shepard	Liberty	15,136	3.11%

1842 general election results
Governor candidate	Running mate	Party	Votes	
William C. Bouck	Daniel S. Dickinson	Democratic	208,072	51.83%
Luther Bradish	Gabriel Furman	Whig	186,091	46.36%
Alvan Stewart	Charles O. Shepard	Liberty	7,263	1.81%

1840 general election results
Governor candidate	Running mate	Party	Votes	
William H. Seward	Luther Bradish	Whig	222,011	50.29%
William C. Bouck	Daniel S. Dickinson	Democratic	216,808	49.11%
Gerrit Smith	Charles O. Shepard	Liberty	2,662	0.60%

1838 general election results
Governor candidate	Running mate	Party	Votes	
William H. Seward	Luther Bradish	Whig	192,882	51.39%
William L. Marcy	John Tracy	Democratic	182,461	48.61%

1836 general election results
Governor candidate	Running mate	Party	Votes	
William L. Marcy	John Tracy	Democratic	166,122	54.24%
Jesse Buel	Gamaliel H. Barstow	Whig	136,648	44.62%
Isaac S. Smith	Moses Jaques	Equal Rights	3,496	1.14%

- Result Manual of the Corporation of the City of New York 1852) (giving wrong number of votes for Smith, "2496" is a typo)
- see also The History of the Loco-foco, Or Equal Rights Party: Its Movements, Conventions and Proceedings by Fitzwilliam Byrdsall (Clement & Packard, 1842)

1834 general election results
Governor candidate	Running mate	Party	Votes	
William L. Marcy	John Tracy	Democratic	181,905	51.84%
William H. Seward	Silas M. Stilwell	Whig	168,969	48.16%

1832 general election results
Governor candidate	Running mate	Party	Votes	
William L. Marcy	John Tracy	Democratic	166,410	51.51%
Francis Granger	Samuel Stevens	Anti-Masonic, National Republican	156,672	48.49%

1830 general election results
Governor candidate	Running mate	Party	Votes	
Enos T. Throop	Edward Philip Livingston	Democratic	128,842	51.22%
Francis Granger	Samuel Stevens	Anti-Masonic, National Republican	120,361	47.85%
Ezekiel Williams	Isaac S. Smith	Workingmen's	2,332	0.93%

1828 general election results
Governor candidate	Running mate	Party	Votes	
Martin Van Buren	Enos T. Throop	Democratic	136,794	49.46%
Smith Thompson	Francis Granger	National Republican	106,444	38.49%
Solomon Southwick	John Crary	Anti-Masonic	33,345	12.06%

1826 general election results
Governor candidate	Running mate	Party	Votes	
DeWitt Clinton	Henry Huntington	Democratic-Republican (Clintonian)	99,785	50.93%
William B. Rochester	Nathaniel Pitcher	Democratic-Republican (Bucktails)	96,135	49.07%

1824 general election results
Governor candidate	Running mate	Party	Votes	
DeWitt Clinton	James Tallmadge Jr.	People's	103,452	54.29%
Samuel Young	Erastus Root	Democratic-Republican	87,093	45.71%

1822 general election results
Governor candidate	Running mate	Party	Votes	
Joseph C. Yates	Erastus Root (Bucktails), Henry Huntington (Clintonian)	Democratic-Republican	128,293	97.78%
Solomon Southwick	(none)	Independent	2,913	2.22%

- Result: The New Annual Register, Or General Repository of History, Politics, and Literature, for the Year 1823 by Andrew Kippis, William Godwin, George Robinson, G. G. and J. Robinson (Paternoster Row, London, England, 1824)

=== 1777-1820 ===
Gubernatorial elections under the State Constitution of 1777. The term was three years, the election held in the last week of April or on May 1.

1820 general election results
Governor candidate	Running mate	Party	Votes	
DeWitt Clinton	John Tayler	Democratic-Republican (Clintonian)	47,445	50.78%
Daniel D. Tompkins	Benjamin Mooers	Democratic-Republican (Bucktails)	45,990	49.22%

Note:

- Tompkins was the sitting US vice president.
- DeWitt Clinton was legislated out of office on December 31, 1822.

1817 special election results
Governor candidate	Running mate	Party	Votes	
DeWitt Clinton	John Tayler	Democratic-Republican	43,310	96.70%
Peter Buell Porter	(none)	Tammany Hall	1,479	3.30%

Note: Governor Tompkins was elected US vice president in November 1816, and he resigned in February 1817. Article XVII of the New York State Constitution of 1777 said that "...as often as the seat of government shall become vacant, a wise and descreet freeholder of this State shall be, by ballot, elected governor,... which elections shall be always held at the times and places of choosing representatives in assembly..." This meant that, whenever a vacancy occurred, the Lt. Gov. did not succeed to the governor's office but administrated the state only until the end of the yearly term of the New York State Assembly on June 30, the successor being elected in April.

1816 general election results
Governor candidate	Running mate	Party	Votes	
Daniel D. Tompkins	John Tayler	Democratic-Republican	45,412	54.02%
Rufus King	George Tibbits	Federalist	38,647	45.98%

1813 general election results
Governor candidate	Running mate	Party	Votes	
Daniel D. Tompkins	John Tayler	Democratic-Republican	43,324	52.17%
Stephen Van Rensselaer	George Huntington	Federalist	39,718	47.83%

1811 special election results
Lieutenant Governor candidate	Party	Votes	
DeWitt Clinton	Democratic-Republican	32,747	50.37%
Nicholas Fish	Federalist	29,046	44.68%
Marinus Willett	Tammany Hall	3,218	4.95%

Note: Lt. Gov. Broome died in August 1810, and the 1777 Constitution provided for new elections if a vacancy occurred either in the Governor's or the Lieutenant Governor's office. See 1817 general election.

1810 general election results
Governor candidate	Running mate	Party	Votes	
Daniel D. Tompkins	John Broome	Democratic-Republican	43,094	54.15%
Jonas Platt	Nicholas Fish	Federalist	36,484	45.85%

1807 general election results
Governor candidate	Running mate	Party	Votes	
Daniel D. Tompkins	John Broome	Democratic-Republican (Clintonian)	35,074	53.09%
Morgan Lewis	Thomas Storm	Democratic-Republican (Lewisites)	30,989	46.91%

1804 general election results
Governor candidate	Running mate	Party	Votes	
Morgan Lewis	John Broome	Democratic-Republican (Clintonian)	30,829	58.20%
Aaron Burr	Oliver Phelps	Democratic-Republican (Tammany Hall); Federalist	22,139	41.80%

Note: Aaron Burr was the sitting US vice president.

1801 general election results
Governor candidate	Running mate	Party	Votes	
George Clinton	Jeremiah Van Rensselaer	Democratic-Republican	24,808	54.34%
Stephen Van Rensselaer	James Watson	Federalist	20,843	45.66%

1798 general election results
Governor candidate	Running mate	Party	Votes	
John Jay	Stephen Van Rensselaer	Federalist	16,012	54.01%
Robert R. Livingston	Stephen Van Rensselaer	Democratic-Republican	13,632	45.99%

1795 general election results
Governor candidate	Running mate	Party	Votes	
John Jay	Stephen Van Rensselaer	Federalist	13,479	53.14%
Robert Yates	William Floyd	Democratic-Republican	11,884	46.86%

1792 general election results
Governor candidate	Running mate	Party	Votes	
George Clinton	Pierre Van Cortlandt	Democratic-Republican	8,440	50.32%
John Jay	Stephen Van Rensselaer	Federalist	8,332	49.68%

Note: John Jay received more votes than George Clinton, but on technicalities the votes of Otsego, Tioga and Clinton counties were disqualified and not counted, giving Clinton a slight majority. Under the Constitution of 1777, the votes were canvassed by a joint committee of the state legislature, six members each from the assembly and the senate. The members were David Gelston, Thomas Tillotson, Melancton Smith, David Graham, Pierre Van Cortlandt Jr., David McCarty, Jonathan N. Havens, Samuel Jones, Isaac Roosevelt, Leonard Gansevoort, and Joshua Sands. The state constitution said that the cast votes shall be delivered to the secretary of state "by the sheriff or his deputy". The ballots from Otsego County were forwarded to the secretary of state by Sheriff Smith who was holding over in office until the appointment of a successor after his term had expired. The ballot box from Clinton County was delivered to the secretary of state's office by a person without deputation who had received the box from the sheriff. The ballot box from Tioga County was delivered to the secretary of state by the clerk of the special deputy appointed by the sheriff. The canvass committee disagreed on whether to allow these ballots to be counted. The question was referred to the U.S. Senators from New York, Federalist Rufus King and Dem.-Rep. Aaron Burr, for arbitration. King said all votes ought to be canvassed. Burr said that the ballots from Clinton County ought to be allowed, and the ones from Otsego and Tioga Counties should be rejected. Thereupon, a majority of the canvass committee (Gelston, Tillotson, Smith, Graham, Van Cortlandt, McCarty, and Havens) rejected the ballots from all three counties and declared George Clinton duly elected governor by a majority of 108 votes. The minority (Jones, Roosevelt, Gansevoort, and Sands) protested in writing. In Otsego County, John Jay had a majority of about 400, and discounting the small majorities for Clinton in Tioga and Clinton Counties, would have won the election. Clinton was accused by the Federalists of usurpation and the canvass committee of having made a partisan decision against the wishes of the electorate.

1789 general election results
Governor candidate	Running mate	Party	Votes	
George Clinton	Pierre Van Cortlandt	Democratic-Republican	6,391	51.74%
Robert Yates	Pierre Van Cortlandt	Federalist	5,962	48.26%

1786 general election results
Governor candidate	Running mate	Votes
George Clinton	Pierre Van Cortlandt	100%

Note: Clinton and Van Cortlandt were re-elected unopposed.

1783 general election results
Governor candidate	Running mate	Votes	
George Clinton	Pierre Van Cortlandt	3,584	75.50%
Philip Schuyler		643	13.55%
Ephraim Paine		520	10.95%

1780 general election results
Governor candidate	Running mate	Votes	
George Clinton	Pierre Van Cortlandt	3,624	100%

Note: Clinton and Van Cortlandt were re-elected unopposed.

1778 special election results
Lieutenant Governor candidate	Votes
Pierre Van Cortlandt	

1777 general election results
Governor candidate	Votes		Lieutenant Governor candidate	Votes	
George Clinton	1,828	48.44%	George Clinton	1,647	47.15%
Philip Schuyler	1,199	31.77%	Pierre Van Cortlandt	1,098	31.43%
John Morin Scott	368	9.75%	Abraham Ten Broeck	748	21.41%
John Jay	367	9.72%			
Robert R. Livingston	7	0.19%			
Philip Livingston	5	0.13%			

Notes:

- The election began on June 1, 1777, but due to the Revolutionary War it took some time to collect and count the votes, and the official result was announced on July 9, 1777. George Clinton accepted the office of Governor on July 11, 1777, and assumed its duties immediately, pending taking the oath as soon as he could safely leave his military command.
- There were no parties yet; the Democratic-Republican and Federalist Parties appeared only in 1789, and until then the candidacies were personal. Besides, the candidates for Governor and Lieutenant Governor were not "running mates"; all candidates were voted for independently.
- The Committee of Safety (the governing body of the State of New York after the Constitutional Convention adjourned) endorsed Philip Schuyler for Governor and George Clinton for Lieutenant Governor, which led to Clinton's receiving votes for both offices and actually winning both. Clinton formally resigned the lieutenant governorship and Pierre Van Cortlandt was elected lieutenant governor in a special election in 1778.

== See also ==
- New York Attorney General elections
- New York Comptroller elections
- New York state elections

== Sources ==
- New York Governor elections
- New York Governor candidates
- New York Lieutenant Governor candidates
