= 2001 New York City mayoral election =

- November 6, 2001
- Registered: 3,715,022
- Turnout: 1,520,443; 40.93% (▲0.84 pp)
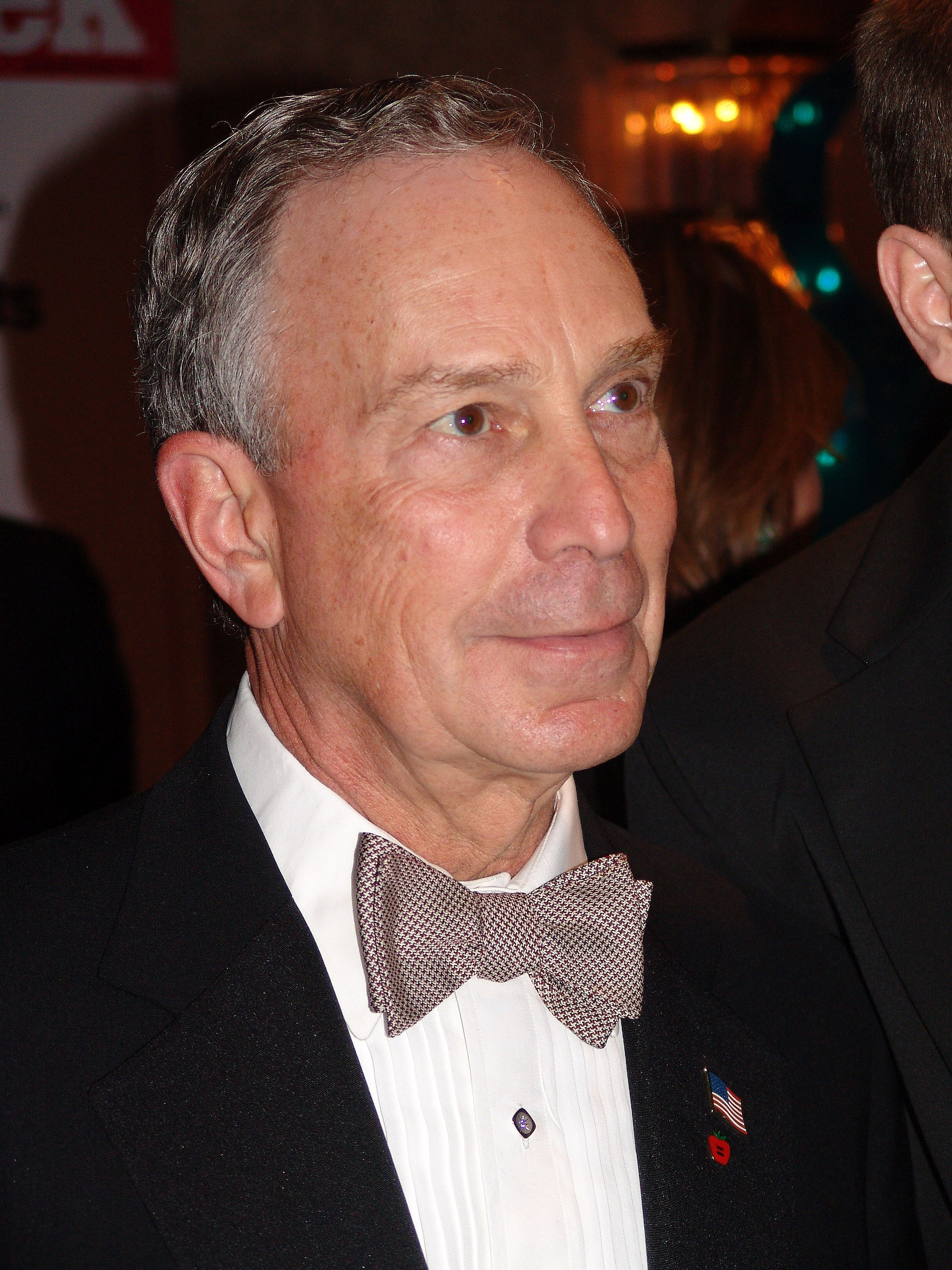

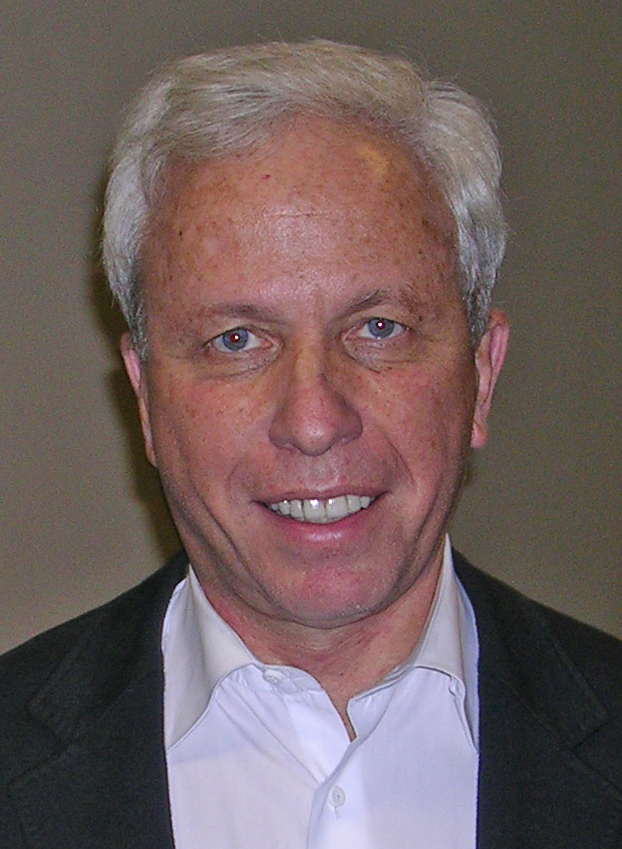
Nominee	Michael Bloomberg	Mark Green
Party	Republican	Democratic
Alliance	Independence	Working Families
Popular vote	744,757	709,268
Percentage	50.3%	47.9%
- Bloomberg: 50–60% 60–70% 70–80% 80–90% Green: 40–50% 50–60% 60–70% 70–80% 80–90%
Mayor before election
Rudy Giuliani
Republican
Elected Mayor
Michael Bloomberg
Republican

The 2001 New York City mayoral election was held on November 6, 2001.

Incumbent Republican mayor Rudy Giuliani could not run again due to term limits. As Democrats outnumbered Republicans by a five-to-one margin in the city, it was widely believed that a Democrat would succeed him in City Hall. Businessman Michael Bloomberg, a lifelong Democrat, changed his party affiliation to run as a Republican. Mark Green narrowly defeated Fernando Ferrer in the Democratic primary, (Note: The primary began on September 11, but was halted due to the September 11 attacks. The official results here are for the rescheduled primary held two weeks later.) surviving a contest that divided the party and consumed the vast majority of the Green campaign's financial resources.

After a campaign largely overshadowed by the 9/11 terrorist attacks, Bloomberg won the general election with 50.3% of the vote to Green's 47.9%. Democrats flipped the boroughs of Manhattan and Brooklyn from the previous election. This is one of two mayoral elections where the winning candidate carried a minority of the boroughs, the other being the 1969 election.

== Background ==
The primaries were scheduled for September 11, but the September 11 attacks caused them to be postponed to September 25 (votes cast on September 11 were not counted), and the runoff was on October 11.

== Republican primary ==
=== Candidates ===
- Michael Bloomberg, billionaire businessman
- Herman Badillo, former Democratic U.S. Representative from The Bronx (1971–1977)

=== Results ===
2001 Republican mayoral primary
Party	Candidate	Votes	%
Republican	Michael Bloomberg	48,055	72.3%
Republican	Herman Badillo	18,476	27.7%
Total votes		66,531	100.00%

==== By borough ====
Republican primary, September 25, 2001
	Manhattan	The Bronx	Brooklyn	Queens	Staten Island	Total
Michael Bloomberg	10,959	3,230	10,168	14,543	9,155	48,055; 72.3%
Herman Badillo	4,161	1,838	4,153	5,700	2,624	18,476; 27.7%
						66,531

== Democratic primary ==
=== Candidates ===
- Fernando Ferrer, Borough President of The Bronx
- Mark Green, New York City Public Advocate
- Alan Hevesi, New York City Comptroller
- George Spitz
- Peter Vallone, Sr., New York City Council Speaker and Councilman

==== Declined ====
- Al Sharpton, Baptist minister, activist, founder of National Action Network and candidate in 1997

=== Campaign ===
Late in the primary, Green was roundly criticized for actions of supporters that were construed as racist, involving literature with New York Post caricatures of Ferrer and Al Sharpton distributed in white enclaves of Brooklyn and Staten Island. Green said he had nothing to do with the dissemination of the literature. An investigation by the Brooklyn District Attorney concluded that Green "had no knowledge of these events, and that when he learned of them, he repeatedly denounced the distribution of this literature and sought to find out who had engaged in it". Nevertheless, the incident is thought to have diminished minority turnout in the general election and helped Bloomberg win in an overwhelmingly Democratic city. (Village Voice columnist Peter Noel wrote that Green "may have replaced [Giuliani] as the most hated white man in the African American community", an ironic twist for someone who had been so popular in that community for so long.)

Green made a controversial decision during the primary runoff to support Giuliani's unprecedented attempt to extend his own mayoral term in the name of the emergency of 9/11. Ferrer opposed Giuliani's ultimately unsuccessful attempt at term extension, and accused Green of being rolled over by Giuliani.

=== Debate ===
2001 New York City mayoral election Democratic primary debate
No.	Date	Host	Moderator	Link	Democratic	Democratic	Democratic	Democratic	Democratic
Key: P Participant A Absent N Not invited I Invited W Withdrawn									
Key: P Participant A Absent N Not invited I Invited W Withdrawn					Fernando Ferrer	Mark Green	Alan Hevesi	George Spitz	Peter Vallone, Sr.
1	Aug. 28, 2001	New York City Campaign Finance Board; Newsday, WNYC, WPIX	Kaity Tong	YouTube	P	P	P	P	P

=== Results ===
Results by borough

Results by State Assembly district

Green: 20–30% 30–40% 40–50%
Ferrer: 30–40% 40–50% 50–60% 60–70% 70–80%
Vallone: 30–40% 40–50% 50–60%

Democratic primary, September 25, 2001
	Manhattan	The Bronx	Brooklyn	Queens	Staten Island	Total
Fernando Ferrer	60,839	86,571	77,516	49,441	5,084	279,451; 35.5%
Mark Green	83,856	26,125	77,805	49,692	5,704	243,182; 30.9%
Peter Vallone, Sr.	25,296	18,268	51,210	48,576	11,842	155,192; 19.7%
Alan Hevesi	32,925	6,066	25,110	27,163	3,504	94,768; 12.0%
George N. Spitz	1,558	1,264	2,923	2,489	283	8,517; 1.8%
						785,365

Green clearly led among Manhattan's Democrats, Ferrer among The Bronx's, and Vallone among Staten Island's. Ferrer and Green were evenly matched in Brooklyn, while all three candidates were essentially tied in Queens.

=== Run-off ===
Democratic primary run-off, October 11, 2001
	Manhattan	The Bronx	Brooklyn	Queens	Staten Island	Total
Mark Green	131,438	38,256	120,781	94,342	18,183	403,000 51.1%
Fernando Ferrer	86,579	106,086	109,831	77,330	7,193	387,019 48.9%
						790,019

== General election ==
=== Candidates ===
- Michael Bloomberg (Republican)
- Bernie Goetz (Fusion)
- Kenneth B. Golding (American Dream)
- Mark Green (Democratic, Working Families)
- Terrance M. Gray (Conservative)
- Alan Hevesi (Liberal)
- Thomas K. Leighton (Marijuana Reform)
- Kenny Kramer (Libertarian)
- Julia Willebrand (Green)

=== Campaign ===
Rudy Giuliani, who was riding high approval ratings following the 9/11 attacks, endorsed Bloomberg.

Unlike his cash-poor Democratic rival, who had just emerged from an expensive primary and expected to rely on traditionally reliable free media coverage that never materialized, Bloomberg continued to spend $74 million on TV ads and direct mail in the weeks after the attacks, a record amount at the time for a non-presidential election (Bloomberg broke this record in 2005). The Economist wrote: "The billionaire businessman [Bloomberg] is usually seen as one of the post-September 11th winners (if such a word can be so used): He would probably have lost the mayoralty to Mark Green, a leftish Democrat, had the terrorist strike not happened. Yet, it is also worth noting that his election probably spared New York City a turbulent period of score-settling over Rudy Giuliani's legacy."

Green posed on the steps of City Hall with Hasidic Jewish leaders, and issued a statement that "leaders from the Satmar congregations of New York City, the largest of the three major Hasidic groups in the city with some 100,000 followers" supported his campaign. But many of the Satmars at that photo op led an upstate Satmar community ineligible to vote in New York City and were also "at odds with the Satmar establishment" based in Williamsburg, Brooklyn, whose leaders were in Europe at the time and unaware that Green had claimed their endorsement.

The election was also notable for two non-politician semi-celebrities running on third-party tickets: Bernhard Goetz, who had achieved fame in 1984 as the "subway vigilante" for shooting four young men who tried to rob him, on the Fusion Party ticket; and Kenny Kramer, the inspiration for the character Cosmo Kramer on the TV show Seinfeld, on the Libertarian Party ticket.

=== Debate ===
2001 New York City mayoral election debate
No.	Date	Host	Moderator	Link	Republican	Democratic
Key: P Participant A Absent N Not invited I Invited W Withdrawn						
Key: P Participant A Absent N Not invited I Invited W Withdrawn					Michael Bloomberg	Mark Green
1	Nov. 1, 2001	League of Women Voters of New York City; New York City Campaign Finance Board; WABC-TV; WNYC-FM	Diana Williams	C-SPAN	P	P

=== Results ===
Bloomberg won a close election, with 744,757 votes. He lost in three of the five boroughs but received enough votes in Staten Island and Queens to prevail. Under New York's electoral fusion rules, candidates were allowed to run representing multiple parties.

General election
		Manhattan	The Bronx	Brooklyn	Queens	Staten Island	Total
Republican-Independence	Michael Bloomberg	179,797	80,597	189,040	210,432	84,891	744,757
Democratic-Working Families	Mark Green	202,574	102,280	217,222	163,528	23,664	709,268
Liberal-Better Schools	Alan Hevesi	3,100	1,619	2,752	2,293	567	10,331
Green	Julia Willebrand	2,241	670	2,456	1,579	209	7,155
Conservative	Terrance M. Gray	507	642	844	1,219	365	3,577
Marijuana Reform Party	Thomas K. Leighton	791	529	680	418	145	2,563
Libertarian	Kenny Kramer	368	296	338	306	100	1,408
Fusion	Bernhard H. Goetz	203	201	333	253	59	1,049
American Dream	Kenneth B. Golding	96	112	163	81	22	474
							1,480,582
