= Electoral reform in New York =

U.S. state electoral reform

Electoral reform in New York refers to efforts to change the voting and election laws in New York State. In 2021, the New York State Legislature asked New York state voters their opinion through referendums on ballot proposals, all of which were denied by voters.

== Changes to election method ==
=== Proportional representation adopted ===
In a 1936 referendum, voters in New York City voted in favour of the adoption of the single transferable vote method of proportional representation. The adoption of STV produced more balanced representation.

In the election immediately preceding STV's adoption, the Democrats won 95.3% of the seats on the Board of Aldermen with only 66.5% of the vote. In 1941, proportional representation gave the Democrats 65.5% of the seats on 64% of the vote, with the Republicans and three smaller parties also gaining seats in proportion to their voting strength.

=== Proportional representation abolished ===
PR was repealed after the 1947 election. The City council has been elected through single-member districts ever since.

Despite NYC thereafter not using proportional representation, and thus small parties losing the ability to elect minority representation, the Conservative Party, Liberal Party and Working Families Party continue to participate in elections through electoral fusion.

=== Instant-runoff voting adopted ===
As of 2021, the primaries for NY City mayoral candidates are being conducted using ranked-choice voting (Instant-runoff voting).

== Expansion of the electorate ==
New York disenfranchises felons both while they are in prison and while they are on parole. The Sentencing Project favors restoring these rights. New York allows absentee ballots for "registered voters who cannot make it to the polls on Election Day because of occupation, business, studies, travel, imprisonment (other than a convicted felon), illness, disability and hospitalization or resident in a long term care facility".

== Allocation of electoral votes ==
In both 2006 and 2007, bills were introduced in the New York Legislature to join the National Popular Vote Interstate Compact and award the state's 31 electoral votes to the winner of the nationwide popular vote. The majority in the Legislature voted against both proposals. The legislation did pass in 2014, and New York joined the compact.

== Ballot access ==
Reformers would like to see the ballot access laws loosened.

Currently, a new party or independent candidate may gain ballot access for one election by collecting a set number of petition signatures for each office (or 5 percent of the votes cast for governor in the most recent election in the jurisdiction, if that is lower). A new party that wins 130,000 votes or 2% of the vote in the previous gubernatorial election or presidential election is recognized statewide as a political party and qualifies to participate in primary elections for two years. This total can be and often is obtained through electoral fusion. Candidates may gain access to primary election ballots by being "designated" by a relevant committee of the party or collecting signatures equal to 5 percent of the party's enrollment in the jurisdiction, up to a set number for each office. A candidate seeking the nomination of a party to which she or he does not belong – e.g. for purposes of fusion – must be authorized by a relevant committee of the party.

== 2021 ballot proposals ==
During the 2021 New York state elections, state voters voted on several ballot proposals. Ballot proposals #1 ("Making Various Changes to Redistricting Process"), #3 ("Allow Legislature to Pass Some-Day Voter Registration"), and #4 ("Allow Legislature to Pass No-Excuse Absentee Voting"), were all related to electoral reform. In accordance with the New York State Constitution, a referendum must be given before the New York State Assembly moved for reforms. All the above proposals were rejected by voters.

The results were as follows:

2021 New York State ballot proposal results
Question	For		Against		Blank		Void		Total votes	Registered voters	Turnout	Result
Question	Votes	%	Votes	%	Votes	%	Votes	%	Total votes	Registered voters	Turnout	Result
Proposal 1: Make Various Changes to Redistricting Process	1,202,106	38.42%	1,518,442	48.53%	406,974	13.01%	1,236	0.04%	3,128,758	12,318,347	25.399%	Rejected
Proposal 3: Allow Legislature to Pass Same-Day Voter Registration	1,179,674	37.67%	1,608,177	51.35%	342,222	10.93%	1,831	0.06%	3,131,904	12,318,347	25.424%	Rejected
Proposal 4: Allow Legislature to Pass No-Excuse Absentee Voting	1,208,664	38.60%	1,568,895	50.10%	352,129	11.24%	1,841	0.06%	3,131,529	12,318,347	25.421%	Rejected

== See also ==
- Electoral reform in the United States
