= New York Attorney General elections =

The New York Attorney General election is held every four years.

== 1942–1982 ==
Year
1942	√ Nathaniel Goldstein; Republican; 1,911,747; 50.22%	Henry Epstein; Democratic; 1,520,415; 39.94%	Alexander Kahn; American Labor; 335,369; 8.81%	Joseph G. Glass; Socialist; 31,957; 0.84%	Eric Hass; Socialist Labor; 7,570; 0.20%		
1946	√ Nathaniel Goldstein; Republican; 2,629,561; 55.38%	Anthony J. DiGiovanna; Democratic; 2,023,257; 42.61%	Benjamin J. Davis, Jr. Communist; 95,798; 2.02%				
1950	√ Nathaniel Goldstein; Republican; 2,524,134; 50.69%	Francis J. D'Amanda; Democratic; 2,229,921; 44.78%	Frank Scheiner; American Labor; 212,990; 4.28%	Arthur Preis; Socialist Workers; 12,392; 0.25%			
1954	√ Jacob K. Javits; Republican; 2,603,858; 51.23%	Franklin D. Roosevelt, Jr. Democratic; 2,430,959; 47.82%	George W. Fish; American Labor; 44,287; 0.87%	Catherine Gratta; Socialist Workers; 4,059; 0.08%			
1958	√ Louis Lefkowitz; Republican; 2,915,657; 52.24%	Peter J. Crotty; Democratic; 2,353,374; 42.16%	Edward Goodell; Liberal; 280,655; 5.03%	Scott K. Gray, Jr. Socialist; 31,746; 0.57%			
1962	√ Louis Lefkowitz; Republican; 3,111,072; 55.16%	Edward R. Dudley; Democratic; 2,408,653; 42.71%	Frederick S. Dennin; Conservative; 99,464; 1.76%	Leroy McRae; Socialist Workers; 21,086; 0.37%			
1966	√ Louis Lefkowitz; Republican; 3,062,355; 53.57%	Frank A. Sedita; Democratic; 2,033,981; 35.58%	Mason L. Hampton; Conservative; 322,693; 5.65%	Simeon Golar; Liberal; 284,813; 4.98%	Paul B. Boutelle; Socialist Workers; 12,333; 0.22%		
1970	√ Louis Lefkowitz; Republican; 3,213,834; 58.18%	Adam Walinsky; Democratic; 1,886,631; 34.15%	Leo Kesselring; Conservative; 409,169; 7.41%	Miguel Padilla, Jr. Socialist Workers; 14,306; 0.26%			
1974	√ Louis Lefkowitz; Republican; 2,624,637; 51.63%	Robert Abrams; Democratic; 2,189,654; 43.07%	Edward F. Campbell; Conservative; 232,631; 4.58%	Raymond H. Markey, Jr. Socialist Workers; 12,283; 0.24%	Raymond H. Martino; Labor; 10,161; 0.20%	Leland W. Schubert; Libertarian; 8,092; 0.16%	Michael Zagarell; Communist; 6,424; 0.13%
1978	√ Robert Abrams; Democratic; 2,352,484; 53.78%	Michael Roth; Republican; 1,973,490; 45.12%	Dolores Grande; Libertarian; 17,381; 0.40%	Jeffrey Reeves; Communist; 15,655; 0.36%	Raymond H. Markey, Jr. Socialist Workers; 15,072; 0.35%		
1982	√ Robert Abrams; Democratic; 3,056,950; 64.44%	Frances A. Sciafani; Republican; 1,560,474; 32.90%	Kevin P. McGovern; Right to Life; 101,357; 2.14%	Dolores Grande; Libertarian; 24,925; 0.53%			

== 1986–present ==
=== 1986 ===
The 1986 election was held on November 4. Democratic incumbent Robert Abrams won re-election against Nassau County Comptroller Peter T. King.

Year
1986	√ Robert Abrams; Democratic; 2,548,386; 65.13%	Peter T. King; Republican; 1,344,344; 34.36%	Michael A. Hardy; New Alliance; 20,100; 0.51%

=== 1990 ===
The 1990 election was held on November 6. Democratic incumbent Robert Abrams won re-election against former New York State Senator Bernard C. Smith and a plethora of third parties.

Year
1990	√ Robert Abrams; Democratic; 2,404,791; 62.73%	Bernard C. Smith; Republican; 1,229,318; 32.07%	Robert F. Nolan; Right to Life; 136,880; 3.57%	Margaret Fries; Libertarian; 22,602; 0.59%	Fred Newman; New Alliance; 22,437; 0.59%	Natalie Harris; Socialist Workers; 17,272; 0.45%

=== 1994 ===
The 1994 election was held on November 8. Republican Dennis Vacco won an open seat in a close election, as Robert Abrams, the Democratic incumbent, decided not to seek reelection.

Year
1994	√ Dennis C. Vacco; Republican; Conservative; 2,294,528; 49.28%	Karen Burstein; Democratic; Liberal; 2,206,188; 47.38%	Alfred I. Skidmore; Right to Life 85,649; 1.84%	James M. Hartman; Independence; Fusion; 37,500; 0.81%	Daniel A. Conti; Libertarian 19,202; 0.41%	Nancy H. Rosenstock; Socialist Workers 13,416; 0.29%

5,325,323 ballots were cast. Out of them, 668,840 were declared blank, void or missing.

=== 1998 ===
The 1998 election was held on November 3. Democratic challenger Eliot Spitzer narrowly unseated one-term Republican incumbent Dennis Vacco :

Year
1998	√ Eliot L. Spitzer; Democratic; Liberal; 2,084,948; 48.20%	Dennis C. Vacco; Republican; Conservative; 2,059,762; 47.62%	Catherine Abate; Independence 81,439; 1.88%	Robert W. Dapelo; Right to Life 60,399; 1.40%	Daniel A. Conti, Jr. Libertarian 19,864; 0.46%	Johann L. Moore; Green 18,984; 0.44%

4,985,474 ballots were cast. Out of them, 660,078 were declared blank, void or missing.

=== 2002 ===
The 2002 election was held on November 5. Democratic incumbent Eliot Spitzer was reelected by a wide margin:

Year
2002	√ Eliot L. Spitzer; Democratic; Independence; Liberal; Working Families; 2,744,302; 66.42%	Dora Irizarry; Republican; Conservative 1,234,899; 29.89%	John J. Broderick; Right to Life 78,268; 1.89%	Mary Jo Long; Green 50,755; 1.23%	Daniel A. Counti, Jr. Libertarian 23,213; 0.56%

4,690,536 ballots were cast. Out of them, 559,099 were declared blank, void or missing.

=== 2006 ===
The 2006 election was held on November 7. Andrew Cuomo was elected to replace incumbent Eliot Spitzer who successfully ran for governor.

Year
2006	√ Andrew Cuomo; Democratic; Working Families 2,509.311; 58.31%	Jeanine Pirro; Republican; Independence; Conservative; 1,692,580; 39.33%	Rachel Treichler; Green 61,849; 1.44%	Christopher B. Garvey; Libertarian 29,413; 0.68%	Martin Koppel; Socialist Workers 10.197; 0.24%

4,701,065 ballots were cast. Out of them, 397,715 were declared blank, void or missing.

=== 2010 ===
The 2010 election was held on November 2, 2010. Eric Schneiderman was elected to replace incumbent Andrew Cuomo who successfully ran for governor.

Year				
2010	√Eric Schneiderman; Democratic; Independent; Working Families; 2,478,659; 55.78%	Dan Donovan; Republican; Conservative; 1,910,361; 43.20%	Carl Person; Libertarian; 36,488; 0.82%	Ramon Jimenez; Freedom; 18,021; 0.41%

=== 2014 ===
The 2014 election was held on November 4, 2014. Eric Schneiderman was reelected for a second term.

Year				
2014	√Eric Schneiderman; Democratic; Working Families; Independent; 2,069,956; 52.7%	John P. Cahill; Republican; Conservative/Stop-Common-Core; 1,538,990; 39.2%	Ramon Jimenez; Green; 80,813; 2.1%	Carl E. Person; Libertarian; 24,746; 0.6%

=== 2018 ===
The 2018 election was held on November 6, 2018. Letitia James was elected to replace Eric Schneiderman, who resigned as attorney general.

Years					
2018	√Letitia James; Democratic; Working Families; Independence; 3,739,239; 62.42%	Keith Wofford; Republican; Conservative; 2,108,600; 35.20%	Michael Sussman; Green; 72,512; 1.21%	Christopher Garvey; Libertarian; 43,767; 0.73%	Nancy Sliwa; Reform; 26,441; 0.44%

=== 2022 ===
The 2022 election was held on November 8, 2022. Letitia James was reelected for a second term.

Years		
2022	√Letitia James; Democratic; Working Families; 3,168,256; 54.63%	Michael Henry; Republican; Conservative; 2,631,301; 45.37%

== See also ==
- New York gubernatorial elections
- New York state elections
- New York Comptroller elections
