= 2002 New York State Comptroller election =

- November 5, 2002

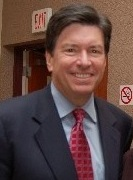
Candidate	Alan Hevesi	John Faso
Party	Democratic	Republican
Popular vote	2,095,913	1,933,104
Percentage	50.41%	46.50%
- County results Hevesi: 40–50% 50–60% 60–70% 70–80% 80–90% Faso: 50–60% 60–70% 70–80%
Comptroller before election
Carl McCall
Democratic
Elected Comptroller
Alan Hevesi
Democratic

The 2002 New York State Comptroller election was held on November 5, 2002. New York City Comptroller Alan Hevesi, a Democrat, defeated former Assembly Minority Leader John Faso, a Republican.

== Democratic primary ==
=== Polling ===
Source	Date	Alan Hevesi	William Mulrow
Quinnipiac	September 3, 2002	39%	16%

== General election ==
=== Polling ===
Source	Date	Alan Hevesi (D)	John Faso (R)
Quinnipiac	September 26, 2002	50%	30%
Quinnipiac	October 16, 2002	44%	36%
Quinnipiac	November 4, 2002	49%	34%

=== Results ===
General election results
Primary election
Party	Candidate	Votes	%
Democratic	Alan Hevesi	353,500	62.59
Democratic	William Hurlow	211,282	37.41
Total votes		564,782	100.0
Right to Life	Garifalia Christea	1,233	53.96
Right to Life	John Berry	1,052	46.04
Total votes		2,285	100.0
Working Families	William Hurlow	327	58.18
Working Families	Alan Hevesi	235	41.82
Total votes		562	100.0
General election
Democratic	Alan Hevesi	1,962,789	47.21%
Working Families	Alan Hevesi	90,351	2.17%
Liberal	Alan Hevesi	42,773	1.03%
Total	Alan Hevesi	2,095,913	50.41%
Republican	John Faso	1,577,957	37.95%
Independence	John Faso	202,384	4.87%
Conservative	John Faso	152,763	3.67%
Total	John Faso	1,933,104	46.50%
Right to Life	Garifalia Christea	61,464	1.48%
Green	Howie Hawkins	47,771	1.15%
Libertarian	James Eisert	19,235	0.46%
Total votes		4,157,487	100.00%
Democratic hold			

== See also ==
Preceded by 1998	New York Comptroller election 2002	Succeeded by 2006
