= Alan Hevesi =

American politician (1940–2023)

53rd Comptroller of New York
- In office January 1, 2003 – December 22, 2006
- Governor: George Pataki
- Preceded by: Carl McCall
- Succeeded by: Thomas Sanzillo (acting)

41st Comptroller of New York City
- In office January 1, 1994 – December 31, 2001
- Mayor: Rudolph Giuliani
- Preceded by: Elizabeth Holtzman
- Succeeded by: Bill Thompson

Member of the New York State Assembly
- In office December 1971 – December 1993
- Preceded by: Emanuel R. Gold
- Succeeded by: Melinda Katz
- Constituency: 25th district (1971-1972); 28th district (1973-1993)

Personal details
- Born: January 31, 1940 New York City, U.S.
- Died: November 9, 2023 (aged 83) East Meadow, New York, U.S.
- Party: Democratic
- Spouse: Carol Stanton (m. 1967; died 2015)
- Children: 3, including Daniel and Andrew
- Education: Queens College (BA); Columbia University (MA, PhD)

Alan George Hevesi (January 31, 1940 – November 9, 2023) was an American politician who served as a New York State Assemblyman from 1971 to 1993, as New York City Comptroller from 1994 to 2001, and as New York State Comptroller from 2003 to 2006.

Hevesi resigned as Comptroller effective December 22, 2006, as part of a plea bargain with the Albany County Court related to his unlawful use of state employees to care for his ailing wife. In February 2007, Hevesi was sentenced to a $5,000 fine and permanently banned from holding elective office.

Four years later, Hevesi pleaded guilty to corruption charges surrounding a "pay to play" scheme regarding the New York State Pension Fund. On April 15, 2011, he was sentenced to one to four years in prison; he served 20 months in prison. He died 11 years later from Lewy body dementia at the age of 83.

== Personal life ==
Alan George Hevesi was born in Manhattan on January 31, 1940, and grew up in Forest Hills, Queens, where he primarily resided for the rest of his life. His parents were Jewish immigrants who left Hungary in 1938 to escape the Nazis. Fifty-five of Hevesi's relatives were murdered in concentration camps. Hevesi's father was Eugene Hevesi (1896–1983), a Hungarian-born American Jewish leader who served as foreign affairs secretary for the American Jewish Committee and as representative to the United Nations for several Jewish NGOs. His brother, Dennis, a reporter for The New York Times and Newsday, died in 2017.

Hevesi earned a Bachelor of Arts in 1962 from Queens College, CUNY. He received a Ph.D. in public law and government from Columbia University in 1971. The title of his doctoral dissertation was Legislative Leadership in New York State. Hevesi taught political science at Queens College for more than 30 years.

Hevesi married Carol Stanton in 1967; they had three children and were married until her death in 2015. Their sons, New York State Assemblyman Andrew Hevesi and former New York State senator Daniel Hevesi, have both had careers in politics.

Hevesi died from Lewy body dementia at a care home in East Meadow, New York, on November 9, 2023, at the age of 83.

== Political career ==
=== State Assembly ===
On November 2, 1971, Hevesi was elected to the New York State Assembly to fill a vacancy caused by the resignation of Emanuel R. Gold. He took his seat during a special session in December 1971. Hevesi served in the Assembly for 22 years.

=== New York City Comptroller ===
Hevesi unsuccessfully sought the Democratic nomination for city comptroller in 1989, as did Frank Macchiarola. Both finished behind Brooklyn District Attorney and former Congresswoman Elizabeth Holtzman. In May 1993, Hevesi began his second campaign for city comptroller. The primary election again featured a three-way race, with Holtzman, Hevesi, and Herman Badillo. Hevesi defeated Holtzman to secure the Democratic nomination, then Badillo, who contested the general election as a fusion candidate of the Republican Party and Liberal Party.

In 1995, Hevesi, as Comptroller, thwarted an attempt by then Mayor Rudolph Giuliani to fill a one-time hole in the city budget that year by selling the New York City water supply system.

By December 1997, Hevesi enlisted the weight and soundness of his city's finances in the cause of forcing Swiss banks to meet the demands of the World Jewish Congress and other organizations then suing Swiss banks over Nazi-era bank balances the WJC said were owed to the heirs of victims of the holocaust, joined eventually by both then-Mayor Rudolph Giuliani and then-Governor George Pataki. In his book on the subject, Norman Finkelstein called Hevesi "the godfather of Holocaust restitution sanctions."

Hevesi recruited many other states' and municipalities' financial officers to put their powers in the service of this cause, at one point calling them to a conference in New York at which they discussed ways to coordinate their actions for maximum effect. Sanctions against Switzerland having seemed successful in securing the $1.25 billion (1999) settlement, Hevesi then brought the power of the ad hoc network he had constructed to bear on subsequent actions against Germany, Austria, and other countries, where its use was deemed successful in raising the amounts of the settlements.

Hevesi served as New York City Comptroller from 1994 to 2002, when he was term-limited out of the office. He won his second term with a Liberal Party endorsement, after which former mayor David Dinkins declined to support him.

=== New York State Comptroller ===
In 2001, Hevesi sought the Democratic nomination for mayor of New York, running on the platform of "Most Experienced, Best Qualified". He finished fourth, behind Public Advocate Mark Green, Bronx Borough President Fernando Ferrer, and New York City Council Speaker Peter Vallone Sr. Hevesi was the Liberal Party nominee for mayor in the general election, but did not campaign, instead endorsing Green. Following his defeat in the mayor's race, Hevesi started his campaign for state comptroller, defeating William Mulrow in a primary, followed by Republican John Faso in the 2002 election.

In November 2006, Hevesi was reelected as New York State Comptroller. On December 23, 2006, Hevesi pleaded guilty to a single felony, agreed to pay a fine of $5,000, and immediately resigned as comptroller.

== Controversy ==
=== Commencement comments ===
At a commencement address he delivered at Queens College on June 1, 2006, Hevesi told his audience that U.S. Senator Charles Schumer was so tough he would "put a bullet between the President's eyes if he could get away with it." Several hours after his remarks, Hevesi apologized for his comments, calling them "beyond stupid, beyond moronic, totally offensive" and "incredibly moronic".

== Criminal history ==
=== Using state employees to chauffeur wife ===
On September 21, 2006, Hevesi admitted that he used Nicholas Acquafredda, a state employee and member of his security detail, to drive and aid his ailing wife Carol. His wife suffered from multiple chronic health issues—primarily a progressively degenerative debilitating spinal injury, severe depression linked to her persistent physical ailments, which led to her attempting suicide in 1994 by cutting her wrists due to the pain, and cardiac complications including open-heart surgery, gallbladder surgery, an untreatable hernia, and a failed knee replacement .

Hevesi claimed that in 2003, the State Ethics Commission decided that he should pay back the entire cost of having a state employee chauffeur his wife unless such services were necessary for safety purposes. However, the State Ethics Commission had found Carol to be a "low-threat risk".

On September 26, 2006, after his Republican challenger, Christopher Callaghan, asked the Albany County District Attorney's office to investigate the matter, Hevesi said he would reimburse the state more than $82,000 for having a public employee chauffeur his wife. Callaghan first phoned in the complaint to the State Comptroller's own hotline. Hevesi had admitted the previous week that he had not previously reimbursed the state. Callaghan and the 2006 Republican nominee for Governor, John Faso, also called for Hevesi's resignation. Then New York State Attorney General Eliot Spitzer, who was then running for Governor of New York, withdrew his endorsement of Hevesi. The controversy stimulated interest in the candidacies of Callaghan and minor party candidates Julia Willebrand of the Green Party and John Cain of the Libertarian Party.

Hevesi claimed that drivers were needed to provide security to his wife, though a bipartisan ethics panel concluded that the State Police found no threat that would justify such an arrangement. The panel also concluded that Hevesi had no intention of repaying the state for the services rendered to his wife until Callaghan publicly filed a complaint.

On October 12, 2006, Albany County District Attorney David Soares' office acknowledged that it was officially investigating actions by Hevesi regarding the public employee hired to chauffeur his wife.

On October 23, 2006, the "Ethics Commission concluded that Hevesi had 'knowingly' violated state law." On November 3, 2006, Hevesi was ordered by the office of State Attorney General Elliot Spitzer to reimburse the state $90,000 — in addition to the $83,000 he has already paid – in compensation for what had been deemed an improper use of a state employee. Hevesi apologized in a TV ad, stating, "I'm asking you to weigh my mistake against my 35 years of public service, I'm human... I'm a good comptroller who did a dumb thing."

On December 12, 2006, Hevesi agreed to a deal that called for the $90,000 in escrow money to be turned over to the state and for him to pay an additional $33,605 within 10 days, making his payback total (with $83,000 already paid) $206,000. According to the Attorney General's report, Hevesi had actually hired four (not two) employees as his wife's "security detail", and said employees ran personal errands for the Hevesi family. On December 13, 2006, a poll conducted between December 5–11 by Quinnipiac showed that 45% of people in New York believed that Hevesi should resign, while 43% believed that he had paid his debt to the state.

On December 14, 2006, the Albany County District Attorney acknowledged that he had a strong enough case to indict Hevesi. That month, Hevesi pleaded guilty to a felony for misusing state funds. In February 2007, he was sentenced by Judge Stephen Herrick in Albany County Court to a $5,000 fine and barred permanently from elected office. As part of the plea deal, he was given no jail time and received no probation. Prior to sentencing, Hevesi paid the state more than $200,000 in restitution. He expressed remorse for his actions and told the judge: "I'm culpable, I'm responsible and I apologize."

=== Payoffs from Hevesi's aides to Raymond Harding ===
On October 6, 2009, Raymond Harding, chairman of the Liberal Party of New York, pleaded guilty to charges that he accepted $800,000 from Hevesi's aides when Hevesi was comptroller of the state of New York.

=== Accepting gratuities ===
As state comptroller, Hevesi faced a conflict of interest allegation in relation to a private capital fund named Markstone Capital Partners. The New York Sun reported, "The New York State comptroller, Alan Hevesi, encouraged California pension managers to invest in a private capital fund founded by a man whose wife has been a generous donor to his political campaigns." The Los Angeles Times first reported the meeting.

Hevesi met with his California counterpart, comptroller Steve Westly, and Markstone Capital Group. They met on May 19, 2003, in order to "pitch" the California Public Employees' Retirement System (CalPERS) to invest in Markstone, a fund that invested in Israeli companies. The Sun reported that in June 2003, Hevesi had invested $200 million in Markstone.

On October 7, 2010, Hevesi pleaded guilty to accepting gratuities for steering the investment funds to California venture capitalist Elliot Broidy. Hevesi had accepted $75,000 in trips for himself and his family and $500,000 in campaign contributions, and benefited from $380,000 given to a lobbyist. After being accused of "pay to play" practices involving the New York State Pension Fund during his tenure as Comptroller, Hevesi pleaded guilty to a corruption charge; on April 15, 2011, he was sentenced to one to four years in prison. He began his prison term as inmate 11-R-1334 at Ulster Correctional Facility on April 17, 2011.

Hevesi went before a parole board on November 14, 2012, and was released on parole on December 19, 2012. He served 20 months of a maximum four-year sentence.

== Publications ==
=== Books ===
- Gittell, Marilyn; Hevesi, Alan G (1969). The Politics of Urban Education. Praeger.
- Hevesi, Alan G (1975). Legislative politics in New York State : a comparative analysis. Praeger. ISBN 0-275-05520-5.

=== Journal articles ===
- "Homophobia: Analysis of a Permissible Prejudice: A Public Forum of the American Psychoanalytic Association and the American Psychoanalytic Foundation". Journal of Gay & Lesbian Psychotherapy. 4 (1): 5–53. January 29, 2001. doi:10.1300/J236v04n01_02. ISSN 0891-7140. S2CID 216114098.
- Hevesi, Alan G. (September 21, 1995). "The Effectiveness Of The NYC Department Of Juvenile Justice's Aftercare Program". Juvenile Justice Digest. 23 (18): 1. ISSN 0094-2413.

=== Newspaper articles ===
- Hevesi, Alan G. (July 8, 1999). "New lead paint law protects landlords, not children". New York Amsterdam News. ISSN 0028-7121.
- Hevesi, Alan G. (July 9, 1998). "A stand must be taken". USA Today. pp. 11A. ISSN 0734-7456.
- Hevesi, Alan G. (April 25, 1987). "When Blacks and Jews Pull Together". The New York Times. p. 1.31. ISSN 0362-4331.

== See also ==
- New York State Comptroller
- 2006 New York State Comptroller election

New York State Assembly
Preceded by Emanuel R. Gold	New York State Assembly; 25th District; 1971–1972	Succeeded by Vincent F. Nicolosi
Preceded by Alfred A. DelliBovi	New York State Assembly; 28th District; 1973–1993	Succeeded by Melinda Katz
Political offices
Preceded by Elizabeth Holtzman	New York City Comptroller; 1994–2001	Succeeded by Bill Thompson
Preceded by Carl McCall	New York State Comptroller; 2003–2006	Succeeded by Thomas Sanzillo; Acting
Party political offices
Preceded by Rudy Giuliani; 1997	Liberal nominee for Mayor of New York City; 2001	Succeeded by Michael Bloomberg; 2005
Preceded by H. Carl McCall	Democratic nominee for New York State Comptroller; 2002, 2006	Succeeded by Thomas DiNapoli
