= Marijuana Reform Party =

New York political party advocating cannabis legalization

- Abbreviation: MRP
- Founded: 1997
- Dissolved: 2004
- Ideology: Cannabis legalization

The Marijuana Reform Party (abbreviated MRP) was a progressive minor political party in the U.S. state of New York dedicated to the legalization of cannabis. Founded in 1997, the Marijuana Reform Party ran a candidate for Governor of New York and other statewide offices in 1998 and 2002.

== Gubernatorial tickets ==
- 1998 – Thomas K. Leighton and Jeffrey C. Wright
- 2002 – Thomas K. Leighton and Thomas J. Hillgardner

== Election results ==
=== Results in New York City elections ===
Year	Office	Candidate	Popular Votes	Percentage
1997	Manhattan Borough President	Thomas Leighton	6,235	3.0%
2001	Manhattan Borough President	Garry Goodrow	7,322	1.9%
2001	New York City Mayor	Thomas Leighton	2,563	0.2%
2001	New York City Comptroller	Tracy Blevins	17,340	1.2%
2001	New York City Public Advocate	Chris Launois	21,721	1.5%

=== Results in New York State elections ===
Year	Office	Candidate	Popular Votes	Percentage
1998	New York Governor	Thomas Leighton	24,788	0.50%
1998	New York Comptroller	Dean Venezia	39,423	0.79%
2002	New York Governor	Thomas Leighton	21,977	0.47%

=== Results in federal elections ===
Year	Office	Candidate	Popular Votes	Percentage
1998	United States Senator	Corinne Kurtz	34,281	0.69%

== Competition with the Green Party ==
In 1998, gubernatorial candidate Tom Leighton accused the Green Party of New York of trying to have him removed several times from the November ballot by "challenging the validity of his petition signatures". The Board of Elections rejected the claim lodged by Richard Hirsh of the Green Party. Both parties, which appeal to liberal voters, competed for 50,000 votes required for an automatic ballot line on future ballots. After both parties failed to obtain enough votes to gain a place on local and statewide ballots, Leighton stated that he had "no plans to try again next time."

== See also ==
- Cannabis political parties of the United States
