= John Faso =

American politician (born 1952)

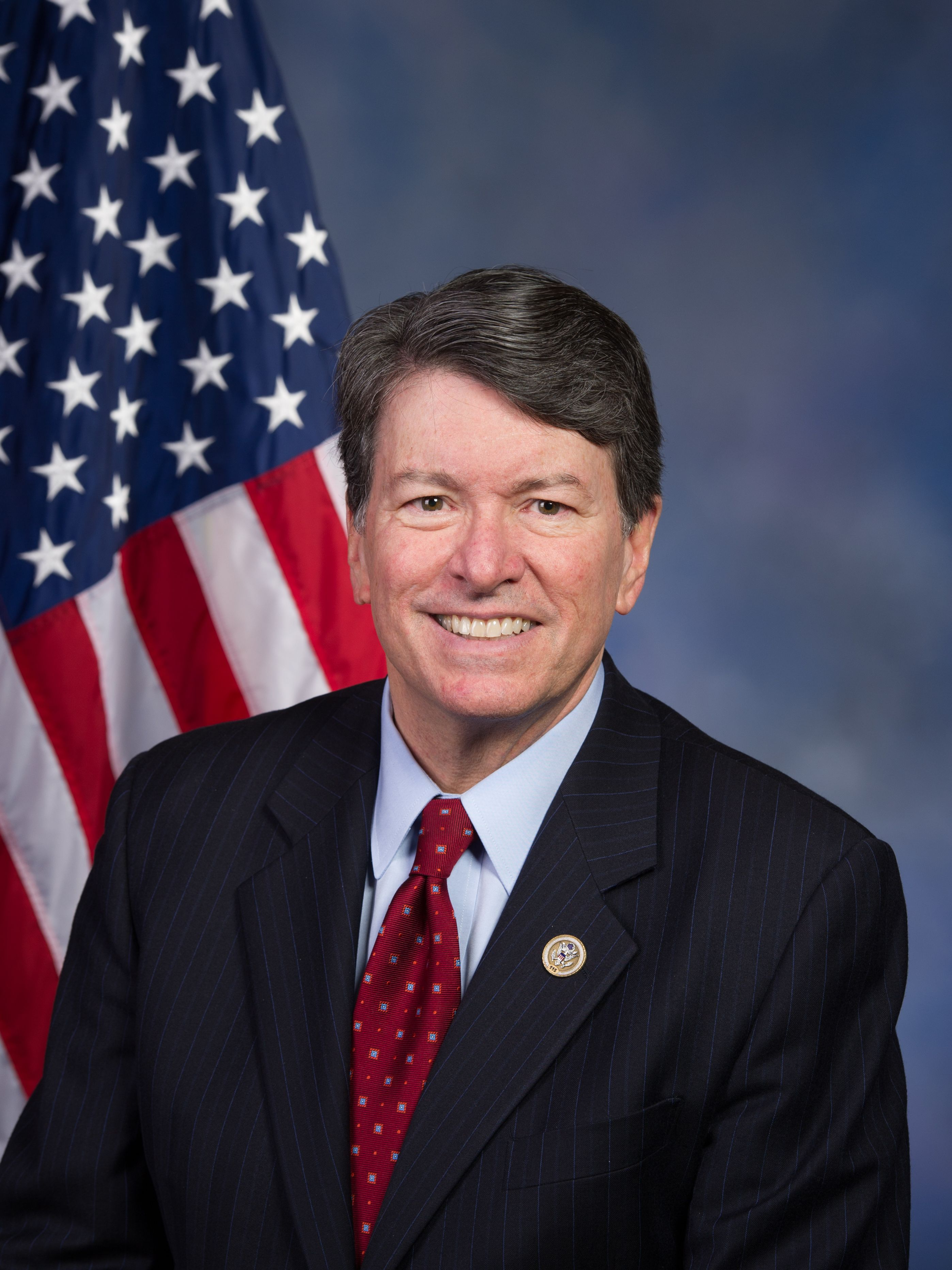

Member of the U.S. House of Representatives from New York's 19th district
- In office January 3, 2017 – January 3, 2019
- Preceded by: Chris Gibson
- Succeeded by: Antonio Delgado

Minority Leader of the New York State Assembly
- In office March 2, 1998 – December 31, 2002
- Preceded by: Thomas M. Reynolds
- Succeeded by: Charles H. Nesbitt

Member of the New York State Assembly from the 102nd district
- In office January 1, 1987 – December 31, 2002
- Preceded by: Clarence D. Lane
- Succeeded by: Joel Miller

Personal details
- Born: John James Faso Jr. August 25, 1952 (age 74) Massapequa, New York, U.S.
- Party: Republican
- Spouse: Mary Frances (m. 1983)
- Children: 2
- Education: State University of New York, Brockport (BS); Georgetown University (JD)

John James Faso Jr. (/ˈfæsoʊ/; born August 25, 1952) is an American attorney and politician who served as the U.S. representative for New York's 19th congressional district from 2017 to 2019. Faso was first elected to the post in 2016. A Republican, Faso previously represented the 102nd district in the New York State Assembly from 1987 to 2002 and served as Assembly Minority Leader from 1998 to 2002. Faso ran for New York State Comptroller in 2002 and for Governor of New York in 2006, but did not prevail in either race. He was defeated for re-election to Congress in November 2018 by Democrat Antonio Delgado.

== Early life, education, and early career ==
Faso is of Italian and Irish descent, the eldest of five siblings. He attended Archbishop Molloy High School in Queens, New York and SUNY-Brockport. After college, Faso became a grants officer for Nassau County, New York. Faso graduated from Georgetown University Law Center in 1979. After law school, Faso took political jobs in Washington, D.C., including as a lobbyist, while considering running for elective office in New York.

From 1979 to 1981, Faso served as a staff member on the United States House Committee on Government Operations. From 1983 to 1986, he worked at the New York State Legislative Bill Drafting Commission.

== Political career ==
=== New York State Assembly ===
In 1983, Faso moved to upstate New York, purposely choosing to live in a district where an Assembly seat would soon become open so that he could run. He was elected to the New York State Assembly for the first time in 1986.

Faso was a member of the New York State Assembly from 1987 to 2002. He received the 1997 Rockefeller College of Public Affairs & Policy Award for distinguished public service. In 1987, Faso called Roe v. Wade, the landmark Supreme Court decision regarding abortion rights, a "black mark upon this country." In late 1994, Faso served on George Pataki's transition team, where he chaired the budget committee. He became head of the team that wrote Pataki's first budget as governor.

In 1995, Faso became ranking member of the Assembly Ways and Means Committee. He was the original sponsor of charter school legislation and was involved in the passage of Governor Pataki's proposal to create charter schools in New York State in 1998. He supported expanding the current cap on charter schools. John Faso was elected Assembly Minority Leader in 1998.

=== 2002 campaign for New York State Comptroller ===
Faso's work on the state budget fueled a run for New York State Comptroller in 2002. Initially trailing Democrat Alan Hevesi (then-Comptroller of New York City) by a 20-point margin, Faso lost the election 50%-47%.

During the campaign, Faso accused Hevesi of having mismanaged the city's pension funds. Hevesi was later forced to resign from office and jailed in a pay-to-play scheme involving New York's state pension fund.

=== 2006 campaign for Governor of New York ===
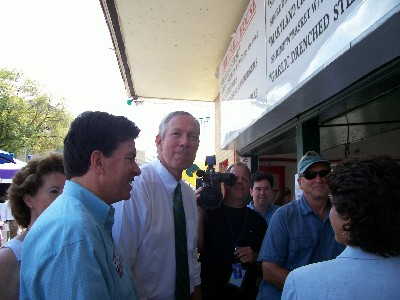
Faso and Governor George Pataki attend the NY State Fair.

In 2005, Faso announced his intention to run for governor. For the Republican nomination, Faso faced former Massachusetts Governor William Weld, former New York Secretary of State Randy Daniels, and Assemblyman Patrick Manning. Weld reportedly offered Faso the chance to join his ticket as a candidate for lieutenant governor.

Faso received the Conservative Party's endorsement while Weld received the Libertarian Party's nomination, guaranteeing both candidates a spot on the ballot if they stayed in the race. However, once the Republican State Convention voted to endorse Faso, Weld announced his withdrawal from the race. Faso's running mate was former Rockland County Executive C. Scott Vanderhoef. Faso was opposed by Democratic nominee Eliot Spitzer.

On Election Day 2006, Spitzer defeated Faso by a margin of 3,086,709 votes to 1,274,335 votes. Spitzer resigned from office a year into his tenure in the midst of a prostitution scandal.

== U.S. House of Representatives ==
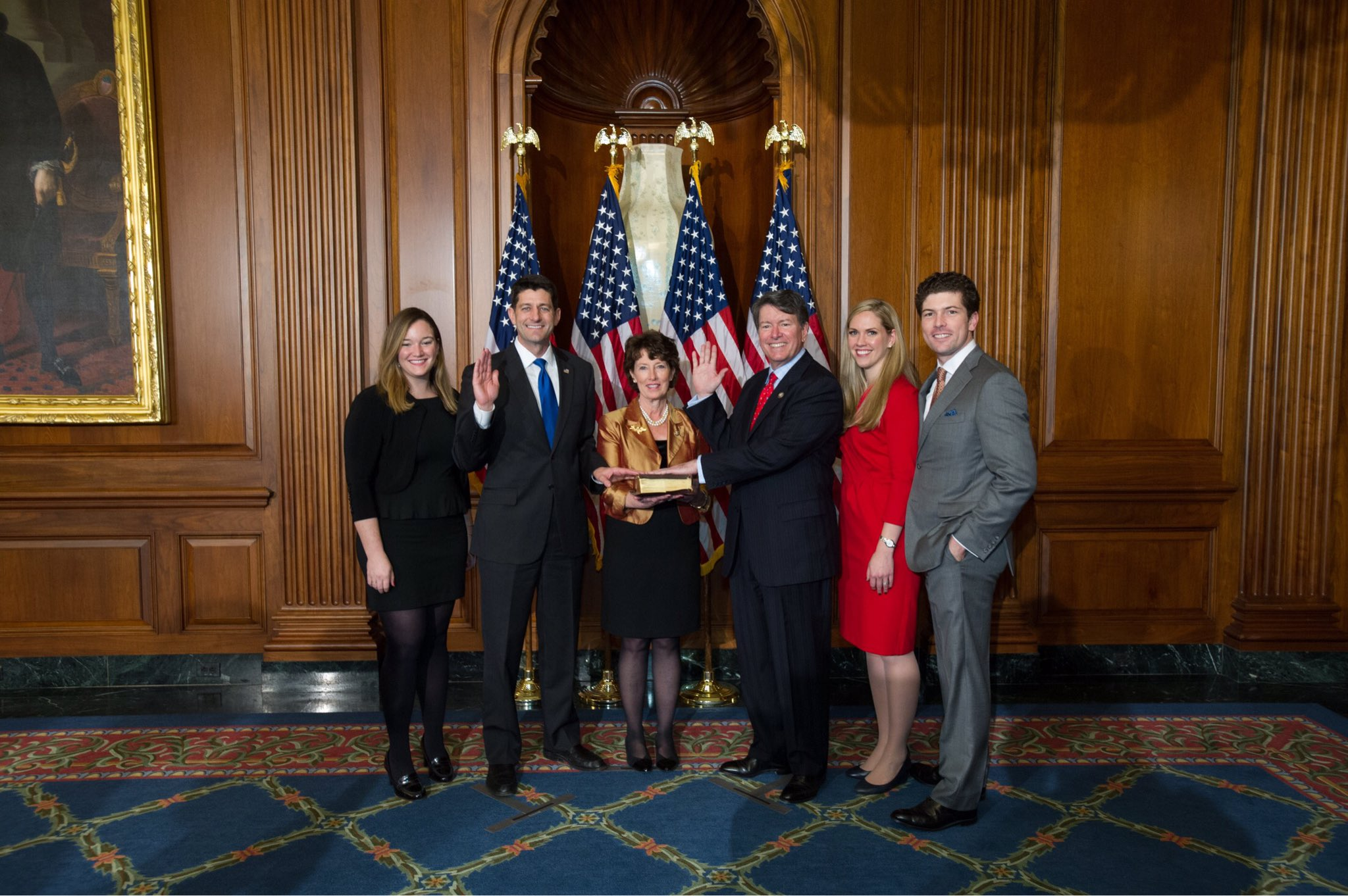
Faso with his wife and children being sworn in by Speaker Paul Ryan for the 115th Congress

=== Elections ===
==== 2016 ====
On September 14, 2015, Faso announced he would run for New York's 19th congressional district in the 2016 election. Republican Chris Gibson, the retiring incumbent, endorsed Faso. He won the Republican primary against Andrew Heaney, 67.5% to 32.5%. During the general election, Faso faced academic and political activist Zephyr Teachout. Faso defeated Teachout with 54.3% of the vote.

Faso was named to the House Budget and House Agriculture Committee as well as the House Transportation and Infrastructure Committee, where he served for one term as Vice Chairman of the Railroads, Pipelines, and Hazardous Material Subcommittee.

==== 2018 ====
Faso ran for re-election in 2018 and was challenged by Democrat Antonio Delgado. According to the Poughkeepsie Journal, the race was "considered one of the more closely watched in the nation as Faso seeks a second term in a moderate Hudson Valley district that stretches from Dutchess County and into the Albany area and Southern Tier."

During the campaign, the National Republican Congressional Committee ran an advertisement criticizing Delgado for his previous career as a rapper. Faso called some of Delgado's rap lyrics "very troubling and offensive", saying they "paint an ugly and false picture of America." The then-candidate, who was seeking to become the first nonwhite person to represent New York's 19th district, has said the criticism of his rap lyrics is an attempt to "otherize" him. The ad against Delgado stirred controversy, with The New York Times editorial board criticizing Faso for what they termed a "cynical campaign of race-baiting".

On November 6, 2018, Delgado defeated Faso 147,873 votes to 132,873.

== Political positions ==
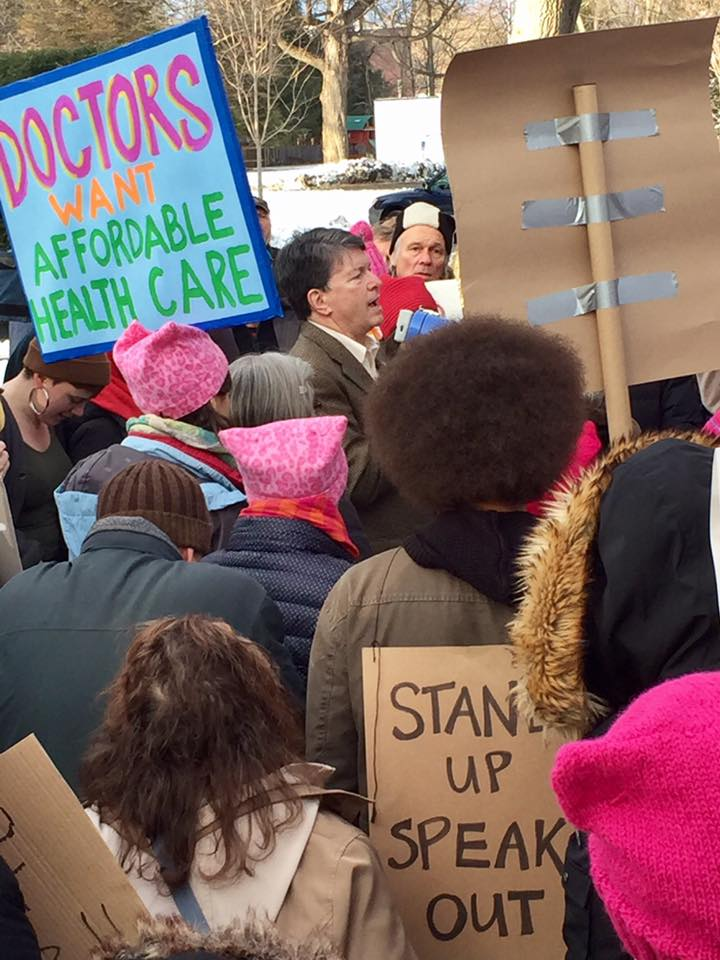
Faso at an Indivisible movement protest in Kinderhook

As of August 2018, Faso had voted with his party in 87.7% of votes in the 115th United States Congress and voted in line with President Trump's position in 90% of votes.

Faso was a member of the moderate Republican Main Street Partnership and the Climate Solutions Caucus. In the 115th United States Congress, Faso was ranked the 18th most bipartisan Representative in the House by the Bipartisan Index, a metric created by The Lugar Center and Georgetown's McCourt School of Public Policy to assess congressional bipartisanship.

=== Drugs ===
On April 26, 2018, Faso announced that he had joined the bipartisan Heroin Task Force, which works on issues related to heroin and opioid abuse. Faso has "co-sponsored alongside more than 100 lawmakers" the Synthetics Trafficking and Overdose Prevention (STOP) Act, which aims to crack down on the shipment of synthetic drugs, such as fentanyl, to the United States.

=== Economy ===
Faso voted against the Tax Cuts and Jobs Act of 2017. "From the beginning, I wanted to support a tax reform plan that would increase economic growth, increase worker paychecks, incentivize small business investment and ensure New York families are better off," he stated after voting against the bill. Faso argued that the $10,000 state and local tax deduction would also deeply impact New York residents of all wealth levels.

In November 2017, Faso said he would vote against the Republican tax overhaul bill, citing the removal of state tax deductions as his reason.

=== Environment ===
In February 2018, Faso and Dan Lipinski (IL-3) introduced the bipartisan Challenges and Prizes for Climate Act of 2018 to encourage innovation in combating climate change.

=== Health care ===
In January 2017, The Washington Post reported on a closed-door meeting in which Faso said that he had "no problem" with defunding Planned Parenthood, but urged his fellow Republicans not to do so as part of the proposed repeal of the ACA (Obamacare); Faso added that using Obamacare repeal legislation to defund Planned Parenthood would be "a gigantic political trap," "a political minefield," and a "grave mistake." In a later interview, Faso clarified that he "does not favor defunding Planned Parenthood" and that "if a separate up-or-down vote on Planned Parenthood funding came up in the House, he would vote for the status quo, effectively keeping the organization funded." In February 2017, Faso voted against a resolution that "reverse[d] an Obama Administration rule barring states from defunding Planned Parenthood." In March 2017, Faso voted to amend an Obamacare repeal bill to remove language that would have defunded Planned Parenthood for one year.

On May 4, 2017, Faso voted in favor of the American Health Care Act, the House Republican bill to repeal the Patient Protection and Affordable Care Act (Obamacare). He faced protests in his congressional district over his position on the AHCA. During his 2018 re-election campaign, Faso said that he supported protections for individuals with preexisting conditions. Faso said that the AHCA bill that he voted for would have protected people with preexisting conditions; however, The New York Times noted that the bill would have allowed states to drop protections for individuals with preexisting conditions.

=== Immigration ===
On June 20, 2018, after attending a meeting on immigration with President Trump and other GOP House members, Faso said that Trump should halt the “zero tolerance” immigration policy under which children were removed from their parents at the Mexican border. On June 24, 2018, Faso told NPR that he supported a Republican compromise bill that would provide legal status for undocumented immigrants that were illegally brought to the U.S. as children.

=== Social programs ===
In 2018, Faso pushed for stricter work requirements on recipients of the Supplemental Nutrition Assistance Program (also known as the Food Stamps program), claiming that SNAP was an easy target for fraudsters and drug dealers. Studies show that SNAP fraud is rare and that fraud represents a small fraction of the SNAP program.

== Legal and consulting career ==
Following his loss in the state comptroller election in 2002, Faso joined the firm of Manatt, Phelps & Phillips as a lobbyist/partner; he took a leave of absence to run for governor in 2006, then rejoined the firm. Manatt, Phelps & Phillips agreed to a settlement in 2010 in response to a corruption probe in which the firm was investigated for its "efforts to serve as a "placement agent" for public pension funds in New York and California without a state or federal license." According to the Wall Street Journal, some "of Manatt's efforts to secure investments were made by John Faso".

From 2003 to 2006, Faso served as a member of the Buffalo Fiscal Stability Authority control board.

From 2012 to 2015, Faso worked as a public affairs consultant for the Constitution Pipeline Co., an energy company that was attempting to build a pipeline to carry natural gas from Pennsylvania to New York State. The pipeline was controversial because the pipeline would have transported gas extracted from hydraulic fracturing (fracking). Construction of the pipeline was ultimately blocked by the state.

== Personal life ==
Faso is married to Mary Frances Faso; they have two children, Nicholas and Margaret. Faso is a Roman Catholic.

New York State Assembly
Preceded by Tom Reynolds	Minority Leader of the New York State Assembly; 1998–2002	Succeeded by Charles Nesbitt
Party political offices
Preceded by Bruce Blakeman	Republican nominee for Comptroller of New York; 2002	Succeeded by Christopher Callaghan
Preceded by George Pataki	Republican nominee for Governor of New York; 2006	Succeeded by Carl Paladino
U.S. House of Representatives
Preceded by Chris Gibson	Member of the U.S. House of Representatives from New York's 19th congressional district 2017–2019	Succeeded by Antonio Delgado
U.S. order of precedence (ceremonial)
Preceded by Nan Hayworth as Former U.S. Representative	Order of precedence of the United States as Former U.S. Representative	Succeeded by Anthony Brindisi as Former U.S. Representative
