= Julia Willebrand =

American activist (1933–2023)

Julia Willebrand 2006 campaign photograph

Julia Willebrand (1933–2023) was an American environmental, peace and education activist and political candidate.

== Biography ==
Julia was born in the Bay Ridge neighborhood of Brooklyn, and resided in Manhattan.

She was active in New York City local government as a member of the Manhattan Citizens' Solid Waste Advisory Board from 1994 to 1999 and as chair of that board 1997 to 1999. She was also a past chair of both the Solid Waste Committee of the NYC Sierra Club and the International Working Group of the Green Party.

Willebrand had several higher degrees including an Ed.D. in English as a Second Language and an MA in Adult Education from Teachers College, Columbia University and a BA in American Studies from the City College of New York. As a public school teacher in the 1960s she was a delegate in her union, the United Federation of Teachers and was active in bringing the UFT to an anti-war position against the war in Vietnam. She subsequently taught as an assistant professor of English studies in the Empire State College, Center for Labor Studies, and as a Fulbright Professor to Hungary.

She was the 2001 Green Party nominee for Mayor of New York, coming in fourth in that election with 7,155 votes, just behind Alan G. Hevesi, who ran as the Liberal Party candidate.

== 2006 Comptroller campaign ==
In 2006, Willebrand was nominated by the Green Party as their candidate for Comptroller. In the race for Comptroller, she was once again opposed by Hevesi, as the incumbent. Hevesi's admission of some wrongdoing in using state employees for family and personal services resulted in a loss of support and stimulated interest in Willebrand's campaign. Critics of Hevesi and past Comptrollers hold that the historical mismanagement of these investments garnered pollution and pension losses.

Willibrand campaigned on sustainable investments. Willebrand believed that turning the direction of those investments toward wise-growth would translate to positive economic change nationally and internationally. Willebrand said that she would look to the Government Pension Fund of Norway as a model of sustainable socially responsible investment, stating that she "...will use the power of the Comptroller as sole trustee of $115 billion in retirement investments as an instrument of peace, joining other states efforts to end the genocide in Darfur by divesting from companies doing business in Sudan."

Willebrand ran for comptroller again, in 2013.

Party political offices
Preceded by	Green Party Candidate for Mayor of New York; 2001	Succeeded by Anthony Gronowicz
Preceded by Howie Hawkins	Green Party Candidate for New York State Comptroller; 2006	Succeeded by
