= Electoral history of Eliot Spitzer =

Elections featuring Governor of New York

Eliot Spitzer has made several attempts at public office. His first campaign was for the Democratic nomination for New York Attorney General in 1994 that was won by Karen Burstein. He won this office in 1998 and 2002, and was elected Governor of New York in 2006.

Spitzer won a landslide victory in the 2006 election with 69% of the vote. It was the largest margin of victory in a gubernatorial race in New York history, and the second-largest for any statewide race in New York history. The only larger victory was Chuck Schumer's 71% victory in his successful reelection bid for the U.S. Senate two years earlier. Spitzer carried all but three counties in the state.

== Electoral history ==
New York Gubernatorial Election 2006
Party	Candidate	Votes	%	±%
Democratic	Eliot Spitzer	2,882,524	69.0	
Republican	John Faso	1,217,516	29.2	
Green	Malachy McCourt	40,729	1.0	

- Faso also ran on the Conservative Party of New York ticket.

New York Gubernatorial Democratic Primary 2006
Party	Candidate	Votes	%	±%
Democratic	Eliot Spitzer	576,246	80.74	
Democratic	Thomas Suozzi	137,456	19.26	

New York Attorney General Election 2002
Party	Candidate	Votes	%	±%
Democratic	Eliot Spitzer (incumbent)	2,744,302	66.42	+18.22
Republican	Dora Irizarry	1,234,899	29.89	−17.73
Right to Life	John J. Broderick	78,268	1.89	+.49
Green	Mary Jo Long	50, 755	1.23	+.79
Libertarian	Daniel A. Counti, Jr.	23, 213	0.56	+.1

- Irizzary also ran on the Conservative Party of New York ticket.

New York Attorney General Election 1998
Party	Candidate	Votes	%	±%
Democratic	Eliot Spitzer	2,084,948	48.2	+.82
Republican	Dennis Vacco	2,059,762	47.62	−1.66
Independence	Catherine Abate	81,439	1.88	+1.07
Right to Life	Robert W. Dapelo	60,399	1.40	−0.36
Libertarian	Daniel A. Counti, Jr.	19,864	0.46	+.05
Green	Johann L. Moore.	18,984	0.44	

- Vacco also ran on the Conservative Party of New York ticket.

New York Gubernatorial Democratic Primary 1998
Party	Candidate	Votes	%	±%
Democratic	Eliot Spitzer	279,180	41.54	
Democratic	Abate	186,626	27.77	

New York Gubernatorial Democratic Primary 2006
Party	Candidate	Votes	%	±%
Democratic	Eliot Spitzer	576,246	80.74	
Democratic	Thomas Suozzi	137,456	19.26	

Statewide tickets on which Spitzer has run
Year	Party	Governor	Lieutenant Governor	Comptroller	Attorney General	U.S. Senate
1998	Democratic	Peter Vallone	Sandra Frankel	Carl McCall	Eliot Spitzer	Charles Schumer
1998	Liberal	Betsy McCaughey Ross	Jonathan Reiter	Carl McCall	Eliot Spitzer	Charles Schumer
2002	Democratic	Carl McCall	Dennis Mehiel	Alan Hevesi	Eliot Spitzer	(no election)
2002	Independence	Tom Golisano	Mary Donohue	John Faso	Eliot Spitzer	(no election)
2006	Democratic	Eliot Spitzer	David Paterson	Alan Hevesi	Andrew Cuomo	Hillary Clinton
2006	Independence	Eliot Spitzer	David Paterson	Alan Hevesi	Jeanine Pirro	Hillary Rodham Clinton
2006	Working Families	Eliot Spitzer	David Paterson	Alan Hevesi	Andrew Cuomo	Hillary Rodham Clinton

== Bibliography ==
- Paterson, David "Black, Blind, & In Charge: A Story of Visionary Leadership and Overcoming Adversity."Skyhorse Publishing. New York, New York, 2020
