= 1998 New York gubernatorial election =

- November 3, 1998
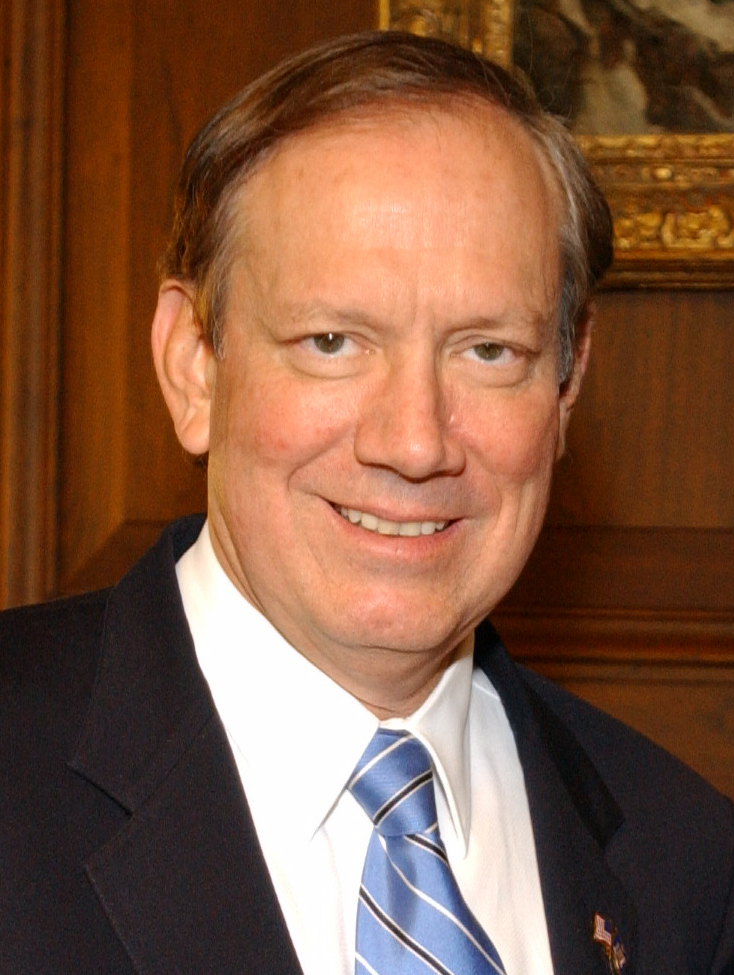

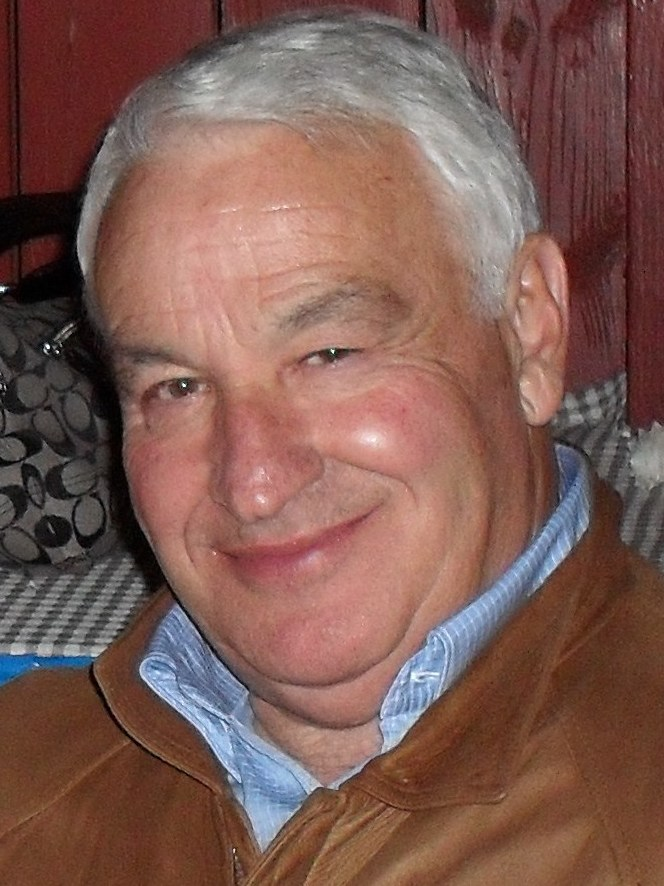
| Nominee | George Pataki | Peter Vallone Sr. | Tom Golisano |
| Party | Republican | Democratic | Independence |
| Alliance | Conservative | Working Families |
| Running mate | Mary Donohue | Sandra Frankel | Laureen Oliver |
| Popular vote | 2,571,991 | 1,570,317 | 364,056 |
| Percentage | 54.32% | 33.16% | 7.69% |
- County results Pataki: 40–50% 50–60% 60–70% 70–80% Vallone: 50–60% 60–70% 70–80%
Governor before election
George Pataki
Republican
Elected Governor
George Pataki
Republican

The 1998 New York gubernatorial election was held on November 3, 1998 to elect the governor and lieutenant governor of New York. Republican incumbent George Pataki was re-elected with 54.3 percent of the vote over New York City council speaker Peter Vallone Jr. and businessman Tom Golisano. This remains the last New York state election in which a Republican won a majority of the vote.

== Democratic primary ==
=== Candidates ===
- Peter Vallone Sr., speaker of the New York City Council
- Betsy McCaughey Ross, incumbent lieutenant governor (also running as Liberal)
- Charles J. Hynes, Brooklyn district attorney and former New York City Fire Commissioner
- James LaRocca, president of the Long Island Association

==== Withdrew ====
- Richard Kahan, former president of the Urban Development Corporation

==== Declined ====
- Sheldon Silver, speaker of the New York State Assembly since 1994

=== Polling ===
| Source | Date | Hynes | Kahan | LaRocca | McCaughey Ross | Silver | Vallone |
|---|---|---|---|---|---|---|---|
| Quinnipiac University | September 24, 1997 | 13% | - | 4% | - | 22% | 20% |
| Quinnipiac University | December 10, 1997 | 13% | 1% | 3% | 26% | - | 17% |
| Quinnipiac University | February 25, 1998 | 12% | 1% | 4% | 18% | - | 17% |
| Quinnipiac University | March 25, 1998 | 16% | 1% | 3% | 27% | - | 16% |
| Quinnipiac University | June 17, 1998 | 14% | - | 5% | 27% | - | 23% |
| Quinnipiac University | July 15, 1998 | 11% | - | 3% | 13% | - | 35% |

=== Results ===
Democratic primary results by county Vallone: 30–40%; 40–50%; 50–60%; 60–70%; 70–80%; Ross: 30–40%; 40–50%

New York Democratic gubernatorial primary, 1998
| Party | Candidate | Votes | % | ±% |
|---|---|---|---|---|
| Democratic | Peter Vallone Sr. | 416,147 | 56.38% | |
| Democratic | Betsy McCaughey Ross | 156,592 | 21.22% | |
| Democratic | Charles Hynes | 109,333 | 14.81% | |
| Democratic | James LaRocca | 56,011 | 7.59% | |
| | Blank – Void – Scattering | | | N/A |
| Majority | | 259,555 | 35.17% | |
| Turnout | | 738,083 | 15.30% | |

== General election ==
=== Candidates ===
- Al Duncan, transit worker and member of the United Transportation Union (Socialist Workers)
  - Running mate: Sarah Robinett, Brooklyn rail worker and member of the United Transportation Union
- Mary Alice France, Queens teacher, children's advocate, and organizer for the Ron Daniels 1992 presidential campaign (Note: France ran as a standalone candidate without a running mate for lieutenant governor.) (Unity)
- Chris Garvey, attorney (Libertarian)
  - Running mate: Donald Silberger, SUNY New Paltz associate professor of mathematics
- Tom Golisano, CEO of Paychex and 1994 nominee for governor (Independence)
  - Running mate: Laureen Oliver, chair of the Independence Party
- Thomas K. Leighton, party founder and 1997 candidate for Manhattan borough president (Marijuana Reform)
  - Running mate: Jeffrey Cyphers Wright, poet and independent magazine publisher
- Al Lewis, actor known for The Munsters (Green)
  - Running mate: Alice Green, activist and prison reform advocate
- George Pataki, incumbent governor since 1995 (Republican, Conservative)
  - Running mate: Mary Donohue, justice of the New York Supreme Court and former Rensselaer County district attorney
- Michael Reynolds, former Tarrytown village trustee (Right to Life)
  - Running mate: Karen Swallow Prior, Buffalo antiabortion activist
- Betsy McCaughey Ross, incumbent lieutenant governor since 1995 (Liberal)
  - Running mate: Jonathan Reiter, New York City personal injury lawyer
- Peter Vallone Sr., speaker of the New York City Council (Democratic, Working Families)
  - Running mate: Sandra Frankel, Brighton town supervisor

=== Polling ===
| Poll source | Date(s) | Sample size | Margin of error | George Pataki (R) | Peter Vallone (D) | Betsy McCaughey Ross (Lib) | Thomas Golisano (I) | Other / undecided (Note: Calculated by taking the difference of 100% and all other candidates combined.) |
|---|---|---|---|---|---|---|---|---|
| Harris Insights & Analytics | October 30, 1998 | 2,243 | – | 49% | 27% | – | – | 24% |
| Quinnipiac University | October 29, 1998 | 584 | – | 55% | 26% | 2% | 11% | 6% |
| Blum & Weprin Associates | October 28, 1998 | 662 | – | 51% | 25% | – | – | 24% |
| Mason-Dixon Polling & Strategy | October 27, 1998 | 808 | – | 54% | 29% | – | – | 17% |
| Marist College | October 27, 1998 | 351 | – | 55% | 26% | – | – | 19% |
| Manhattanville College | October 25, 1998 | 601 | – | 57% | 22% | – | – | 21% |
| Zogby Interactive/JZ Analytics | October 24, 1998 | 700 | – | 53% | 22% | – | – | 25% |
| Quinnipiac University | October 23, 1998 | 547 | – | 57% | 24% | 3% | 10% | 6% |
| CBS News/The New York Times | October 23, 1998 | 639 (RV) | – | 56% | 21% | – | – | 23% |
| Harris Insights & Analytics | October 20, 1998 | 1,792 | – | 48% | 24% | – | – | 28% |
| Zogby Interactive/JZ Analytics | October 15, 1998 | 706 | – | 53% | 21% | – | – | 26% |
| Quinnipiac University | October 15, 1998 | – | – | 54% | 25% | 4% | 9% | 8% |
| Blum & Weprin Associates | October 13, 1998 | 364 | – | 57% | 26% | – | – | 17% |
| Quinnipiac University | September 27, 1998 | – | – | 53% | 26% | 4% | 9% | 8% |
| Quinnipiac University | June 17, 1998 | – | – | 59% | 19% | 12% | – | 10% |
| Quinnipiac University | July 22, 1997 | – | – | 47% | 27% | – | – | 26% |
| Quinnipiac University | March 25, 1998 | – | – | 58% | 26% | – | – | 16% |
| Quinnipiac University | February 25, 1998 | – | – | 60% | 23% | – | – | 17% |
| Quinnipiac University | December 10, 1997 | – | – | 56% | 26% | – | – | 18% |
| Quinnipiac University | September 24, 1997 | – | – | 55% | 26% | – | – | 19% |

Hypothetical polling

with Charles Hynes

| Source | Date | George Pataki (R) | Charles Hynes (D) | Betsy McCaughey Ross (Lib) |
|---|---|---|---|---|
| Quinnipiac University | July 22, 1997 | 47% | 30% | – |
| Quinnipiac University | September 24, 1997 | 55% | 26% | – |
| Quinnipiac University | December 10, 1997 | 54% | 28% | – |
| Quinnipiac University | February 25, 1998 | 60% | 23% | – |
| Quinnipiac University | March 25, 1998 | 60% | 25% | – |
| Quinnipiac University | June 17, 1998 | 59% | 18% | 12% |

with Richard Kahan

| Source | Date | George Pataki (R) | Richard Kahan (D) |
|---|---|---|---|
| Quinnipiac University | December 10, 1997 | 57% | 21% |
| Quinnipiac University | February 25, 1998 | 62% | 17% |
| Quinnipiac University | March 25, 1998 | 62% | 19% |

with James LaRocca

| Source | Date | George Pataki (R) | James LaRocca (D) | Betsy McCaughey Ross (Lib) |
|---|---|---|---|---|
| Quinnipiac University | July 22, 1997 | 48% | 23% | – |
| Quinnipiac University | September 24, 1997 | 55% | 21% | – |
| Quinnipiac University | December 10, 1997 | 57% | 21% | – |
| Quinnipiac University | February 25, 1998 | 61% | 18% | – |
| Quinnipiac University | March 25, 1998 | 63% | 19% | – |
| Quinnipiac University | June 17, 1998 | 59% | 15% | 13% |

with Betsy McCaughey Ross as Democratic nominee

| Source | Date | George Pataki (R) | Betsy McCaughey Ross (D) |
|---|---|---|---|
| Quinnipiac University | December 10, 1997 | 54% | 29% |
| Quinnipiac University | February 25, 1998 | 59% | 26% |
| Quinnipiac University | March 25, 1998 | 57% | 30% |
| Quinnipiac University | June 17, 1998 | 63% | 26% |

with Sheldon Silver

| Source | Date | George Pataki (R) | Sheldon Silver (D) |
|---|---|---|---|
| Quinnipiac University | September 24, 1997 | 55% | 29% |

=== Results ===
New York gubernatorial election, 1998
| Party | Candidate | Votes | % | ±% |
|---|---|---|---|---|
| Republican | George Pataki | 2,223,264 | 44.59% | |
| Conservative | George Pataki | 348,727 | 6.99% | |
| Total | George Pataki (incumbent) | 2,571,991 | 54.32% | +5.53% |
| Democratic | Peter Vallone, Sr. | 1,518,992 | 30.47% | |
| Working Families | Peter Vallone, Sr. | 51,325 | 1.03% | |
| Total | Peter Vallone, Sr. | 1,570,317 | 33.16% | −12.29% |
| Independence | Tom Golisano | 364,056 | 7.69% | +3.51% |
| Liberal | Betsy McCaughey | 77,915 | 1.65% | −0.12% |
| Right to Life | Michael Reynolds | 56,683 | 1.20% | −0.10% |
| Green | Al Lewis | 52,533 | 1.11% | N/A |
| Marijuana Reform | Thomas K. Leighton | 24,788 | 0.52% | N/A |
| Unity | Mary Alice France | 9,692 | 0.21% | N/A |
| Libertarian | Chris Garvey | 4,722 | 0.11% | −0.07% |
| Socialist Workers | Al Duncan | 2,539 | 0.05% | +0.01% |
| | Blank – Void – Scattering | 250,696 | 5.02% | N/A |
| Majority | | 1,001,674 | 21.15% | +17.81% |
| Turnout | | 4,985,932 | | |
| Republican hold | | Swing | | |

==== Results in New York City ====
1998 New York governor election results in NYC by State Assembly district

== See also ==
- Governorship of George Pataki
