= Alice Green (activist) =

American activist (1939/1940–2024)

Alice Green (1939 or 1940 – August 20, 2024) was an American activist and prison reform advocate, living in Albany, New York, who was the Green Party candidate for lieutenant governor in 1998, and its Albany mayoral candidate in 2005. Green founded the Center for Law and Justice in 1985, and was its executive director.

== Early life, education, and early career ==
Green was born in Greenville South Carolina and raised in a small town in the Adirondacks area of Upstate New York in the early 1940s, and raised in “the Champlain Valley hamlet of Witherbee.”

Green earned several degrees from SUNY Albany (now U. at Albany). These include a bachelor's in African-American studies, master's degrees in education, social welfare and criminal justice, and a doctorate in criminal justice.

She worked as a secondary school teacher, a social worker, and as the Executive Director of the Trinity Institution (as of March 2009, the Trinity Alliance for the Capital Region). Starting in the 1960s, Green's activism gained much local publicity, especially in her role as chair of the NAACP Legal Redress Committee.

She was legislative director for the New York Civil Liberties Union in the 1980s. In 1984, Green founded the Center For Law and Justice, Inc., after the police shooting of Jessie Davis, an African-American youth in Albany.

In 1985, Governor Mario Cuomo appointed Green as a member of the Citizens Policy and Complaint Review Council of New York State Commission on Corrections. In 1986, Cuomo also appointed her as Deputy Commissioner for New York State Division of Probation and Correctional Alternatives.

Green organized "much-publicized protests at the annual Martin Luther King, Jr. Day events hosted by Governor Pataki from 1995 through 1999."

She briefly attended Albany Law School, in 1990, but did not complete a Juris Doctor degree.

== Political campaigns ==
In 1998, Green ran for lieutenant governor on the Green Party of New York State ticket with Al "Grandpa" Lewis, and gained over 52,000 votes.

In 2005, Green was a candidate for mayor of Albany, which garnered significant local publicity. She lost the race against incumbent Mayor Jerry Jennings, but garnered about 25% of the vote in November.

In 2008, Green served as a member of the committee to fill vacancies for Green Party presidential candidate Cynthia McKinney, but was later a contributor to Democrat Barack Obama.

== Activism work ==
Green was the executive director of the Center for Law and Justice, a not-for-profit community organization, for many years. That group is part of the "Community Empowerment Center." As part of her work, she was an EEO compliance officer.

She was an adjunct professor at the University at Albany, and wrote and lectured frequently on racism and criminal justice issues. She was often sought out by members of the media for comment on such issues. In an interview for NEWS10, she said that if the SUNY Albany students (Alexis Briggs, Ariel Agudio and Asha Burwell - ABC STUDENTS), did attack first and were the ones being racist, they should be asked to apologise and not be punished. NEWS10 Video

She was the co-author, with Frankie Y. Bailey, of two books: Law Never Here: A Social History of African American Responses to Issues of Crime and Justice (1999), and Wicked Albany: Lawlessness & Liquor in the Prohibition Era (2009).

== Legacy and personal life ==
Green won numerous awards for her activism in the Capital District, including from the New York State Bar Association, NAACP, and Rockefeller College.

She gained considerable notoriety over the years from her political stances, as well as racist and vicious criticism directed at her.

Her papers have been collected for the library at the University of Albany.

Green was married to Charles L. Touhey, president of Touhey Associates, who also serves on the board of the Center For Law and Justice, Inc. Green died on August 20, 2024, at the age of 84.

== Electoral history ==
General election results 1998
Governor candidate	Lt. Gov. Running mate	Party	Popular Vote	
George E. Pataki	Mary O. Donohue	Republican, Conservative Party of NY	2,571,991	54.32%
Peter F. Vallone Sr.	Sandra Frankel	Democratic, Working Families	1,570,317	33.16%
B. Thomas Golisano	Laureen Oliver	Independence Party of NY	364,056	7.69%
Betsy McCaughey Ross	Jonathan C. Reiter	Liberal Party of NY	77,915	1.65%
Michael Reynolds	Karen Prior	NY State Right to Life	56,683	1.20%
Al Lewis	Alice Green	Green Party US	52,533	1.11%
		Other parties		Less than 1%

== General Reference ==
- Alice P. Green Papers, 1960-2001. M.E. Grenander Department of Special Collections and Archives, University Libraries, University at Albany, State University of New York (hereafter referred to as the Green Papers).
