= List of lieutenant governors of New York =

This is a complete list of the people who have served as lieutenant governor of the U.S. state of New York.

The Lieutenant Governor of New York, who is the president of the New York State Senate, is the second-highest position in the New York state government; the officeholder is first in line to succeed to the governorship should the governor resign, die or be removed from office via impeachment conviction. The lieutenant governor also assumes the gubernatorial powers and duties as acting governor if the governor is unable to perform those powers and duties.

New York currently has the highest-paid lieutenant governor in the country, with an annual salary of $220,000 as of 2021. As of May 25, 2022, Antonio Delgado is lieutenant governor.

== List of lieutenant governors of New York ==
	Photo	Name	Term in office	Party	Governor
		Pierre Van Cortlandt	July 30, 1777 – June 30, 1795	Democratic-Republican Party	George Clinton
		Stephen Van Rensselaer	July 1, 1795 – June 30, 1801	Federalist Party	John Jay
		Jeremiah Van Rensselaer	July 1, 1801 – June 30, 1804	Democratic-Republican Party	George Clinton
		John Broome	July 1804 – August 8, 1810	Democratic-Republican Party	Morgan Lewis
		John Broome	July 1804 – August 8, 1810	Democratic-Republican Party	Daniel Tompkins
Office vacant from August 8, 1810 – January 29, 1811					Daniel Tompkins
–		John Tayler	January 29 – May 2, 1811	Democratic-Republican Party	Daniel Tompkins
		DeWitt Clinton	May 2, 1811 – July 1, 1813	Democratic-Republican Party	Daniel Tompkins
		John Tayler	July 1, 1813 – February 24, 1817	Democratic-Republican Party	Daniel Tompkins
–		Philetus Swift	February 24, 1817 – June 30, 1817	Democratic-Republican Party	John Tayler (Acting)
		John Tayler	July 1, 1817 – December 31, 1822	Democratic-Republican Party	DeWitt Clinton
		Erastus Root	January 1 – December 31, 1823	Democratic-Republican Party	Joseph C. Yates
		James Tallmadge Jr.	January 1, 1825 – December 31, 1826	Democratic-Republican Party	DeWitt Clinton
		Nathaniel Pitcher	January 1, 1827 – February 10, 1828	Democratic-Republican Party	DeWitt Clinton
–		Peter R. Livingston	February 11 – October 17, 1828	Democratic-Republican Party	Nathaniel Pitcher
–		Charles Dayan	October 17 – December 31, 1828	Democratic-Republican Party	Nathaniel Pitcher
		Enos T. Throop	January 1 – March 12, 1829	Democratic Party	Martin Van Buren
–		Charles Stebbins	1829–1829	Democratic Party	Enos T. Throop
–		William M. Oliver	1830–1830	Democratic Party	Enos T. Throop
		Edward P. Livingston	1831–1832	Democratic Party	Enos T. Throop
		John Tracy	January 1, 1831 – December 31, 1838	Democratic Party	William L. Marcy
		Luther Bradish	January 1, 1839 – December 31, 1842	Whig Party	William H. Seward
		Daniel S. Dickinson	January 1, 1843 – December 31, 1844	Democratic Party	William C. Bouck
		Addison Gardiner	January 1, 1845 – July 5, 1847	Democratic Party	Silas Wright
		Addison Gardiner	January 1, 1845 – July 5, 1847	Democratic Party	John Young
–		Albert Lester	July 5 – December 31, 1847	Whig Party	John Young
		Hamilton Fish	January 1 – December 31, 1848	Whig Party	John Young
		George W. Patterson	January 1, 1849 – December 31, 1850	Whig Party	Hamilton Fish
		Sanford E. Church	January 1, 1851 – December 31, 1854	Democratic Party	Washington Hunt
		Sanford E. Church	January 1, 1851 – December 31, 1854	Democratic Party	Horatio Seymour
		Henry J. Raymond	January 1, 1855 – December 31, 1856	Whig Party	Myron H. Clark
		Henry R. Selden	January 1, 1857 – December 31, 1858	Republican Party	John A. King
		Robert Campbell	January 1, 1859 – December 31, 1862	Republican Party	Edwin D. Morgan
		David R. Floyd-Jones	January 1, 1863 – December 31, 1864	Democratic Party	Horatio Seymour
		Thomas G. Alvord	January 1, 1865 – December 31, 1866	Union Party	Reuben Fenton
		Stewart L. Woodford	January 1, 1867 – December 31, 1868	Union Party	Reuben Fenton
		Allen C. Beach	January 1, 1869 – December 31, 1872	Democratic Party	John T. Hoffman
		John C. Robinson	January 1, 1873 – December 31, 1874	Republican Party	John A. Dix
		William Dorsheimer	January 1, 1875 – December 31, 1879	Democratic Party	Samuel Tilden
		William Dorsheimer	January 1, 1875 – December 31, 1879	Democratic Party	Lucius Robinson
		George G. Hoskins	January 1, 1880 – December 31, 1882	Republican Party	Alonzo B. Cornell
		David B. Hill	January 1, 1883 – January 6, 1885	Democratic Party	Grover Cleveland
–		Dennis McCarthy	January 6 – December 31, 1885	Republican Party	David B. Hill
		Edward F. Jones	January 1, 1886 – December 31, 1891	Democratic Party	David B. Hill
		William F. Sheehan	January 1, 1892 – December 31, 1894	Democratic Party	Roswell P. Flower
		Charles T. Saxton	January 1, 1895 – December 31, 1896	Republican Party	Levi P. Morton
		Timothy L. Woodruff	January 1, 1897 – December 31, 1902	Republican Party	Frank S. Black
		Timothy L. Woodruff	January 1, 1897 – December 31, 1902	Republican Party	Theodore Roosevelt
		Timothy L. Woodruff	January 1, 1897 – December 31, 1902	Republican Party	Benjamin Odell
		Frank W. Higgins	January 1, 1903 – December 31, 1904	Republican Party	Benjamin Odell
		Matthew L. Bruce	January 1, 1905 – December 5, 1906	Republican Party	Frank W. Higgins
–		John Raines	December 5 – 31, 1906	Republican Party	Frank W. Higgins
		Lewis S. Chanler	January 1, 1907 – December 31, 1908	Democratic Party	Charles Evans Hughes
		Horace White	January 1, 1909 – October 6, 1910	Republican Party	Charles Evans Hughes
–		George H. Cobb	October 6 – December 31, 1910	Republican Party	Horace White
		Thomas F. Conway	January 1, 1911 – December 31, 1912	Democratic Party	John A. Dix
		Martin H. Glynn	January 1 – October 17, 1913	Democratic Party	William Sulzer
–		Robert F. Wagner	October 17, 1913 – December 31, 1914	Democratic Party	Martin H. Glynn
		Edward Schoeneck	January 1, 1915 – December 31, 1918	Republican Party	Charles S. Whitman
		Harry C. Walker	January 1, 1919 – December 31, 1920	Democratic Party	Al Smith
		Jeremiah Wood	January 1, 1921 – September 26, 1922	Republican Party	Nathan L. Miller
–		Clayton R. Lusk	September 26 – December 31, 1922	Republican Party	Nathan L. Miller
		George R. Lunn	January 1, 1923 – December 31, 1924	Democratic Party	Al Smith
		Seymour Lowman	January 1, 1925 – December 31, 1926	Republican Party	Al Smith
		Edwin Corning	January 1, 1927 – December 31, 1928	Democratic Party	Al Smith
		Herbert H. Lehman	January 1, 1929 – December 31, 1932	Democratic Party	Franklin D. Roosevelt
		M. William Bray	January 1, 1933 – December 31, 1938	Democratic Party	Herbert H. Lehman
		Charles Poletti	January 1, 1939 – December 3, 1942	Democratic Party	Herbert H. Lehman
–		Joe R. Hanley	December 3 – 31, 1942	Republican Party	Charles Poletti
		Thomas W. Wallace	January 1 – November 2, 1943	Republican Party	Thomas E. Dewey
		Joe R. Hanley	November 2, 1943 – December 31, 1950	Republican Party	Thomas E. Dewey
		Frank C. Moore	January 1, 1951 – September 30, 1953	Republican Party	Thomas E. Dewey
–		Arthur H. Wicks	September 30 – November 18, 1953	Republican Party	Thomas E. Dewey
–		Walter J. Mahoney	November 18, 1953 – December 31, 1954	Republican Party	Thomas E. Dewey
		George DeLuca	January 1, 1955 – December 31, 1958	Democratic Party	W. Averell Harriman
		Malcolm Wilson	January 1, 1959 – December 18, 1973	Republican Party	Nelson Rockefeller
–		Warren M. Anderson	December 18, 1973 – December 31, 1974	Republican Party	Malcolm Wilson
		Mary Anne Krupsak	January 1, 1975 – December 31, 1978	Democratic Party	Hugh Carey
		Mario Cuomo	January 1, 1979 – December 31, 1982	Democratic Party	Hugh Carey
		Alfred DelBello	January 1, 1983 – February 1, 1985	Democratic Party	Mario Cuomo
–		Warren M. Anderson	February 1, 1985 – December 31, 1986	Republican Party	Mario Cuomo
		Stan Lundine	January 1, 1987 – December 31, 1994	Democratic Party	Mario Cuomo
		Betsy McCaughey Ross	January 1, 1995 – December 31, 1998	Republican Party	George Pataki
		Mary Donohue	January 1, 1999 – December 31, 2006	Republican Party	George Pataki
		David Paterson	January 1, 2007 – March 17, 2008	Democratic Party	Eliot Spitzer
–		Joseph Bruno	March 17 – June 24, 2008	Republican Party	David Paterson
–		Dean Skelos	June 24 – December 31, 2008	Republican Party	David Paterson
Office vacant from December 31, 2008 – January 7, 2009					David Paterson
–		Malcolm Smith	January 7 – June 8, 2009	Democratic Party	David Paterson
–		Pedro Espada	June 8 – July 8, 2009	Democratic Party	David Paterson
		Richard Ravitch	July 8, 2009 – December 31, 2010	Democratic Party	David Paterson
		Robert Duffy	January 1, 2011 – December 31, 2014	Democratic Party	Andrew Cuomo
		Kathy Hochul	January 1, 2015 – August 23, 2021	Democratic Party	Andrew Cuomo
–		Andrea Stewart-Cousins	August 24 – September 9, 2021	Democratic Party	Kathy Hochul
		Brian Benjamin	September 9, 2021 – April 12, 2022	Democratic Party	Kathy Hochul
–		Andrea Stewart-Cousins	April 12 – May 25, 2022	Democratic Party	Kathy Hochul
		Antonio Delgado	May 25, 2022 – Incumbent	Democratic Party	Kathy Hochul
		Adrienne Adams	Lieutenant governor-elect takes office January 1, 2027	Democratic Party	Kathy Hochul

== See also ==
- Lieutenant Governor of New York
- New York gubernatorial elections (to see the election results for the lieutenant governor of New York)
- Politics of New York (state)
