= Laureen Oliver =

American politician

Laureen Oliver is an American political activist, candidate, and consultant who co-founded the Independence Party of New York (IPNY) in the 1990s. She was the party's first state chair and was twice its nominee for statewide offices including lieutenant governor during the period it was affiliated with the Reform Party of the United States of America. As campaign advisor to Tom Golisano, she led his 1994, 1998, and 2002 bids for governor of New York. She also served on the presidential committee for Governor Richard Lamm of the Reform Party.

Prior to starting the Independence Party, Oliver was the chairwoman of the Monroe County chapter of United We Stand America, an organization founded by former presidential candidate Ross Perot. In the 2000s, she was co-chairperson of Responsible New York with Tom Golisano. A ballot access expert, she advised independent Texas gubernatorial candidate Kinky Friedman, as well as H. Russell Potts Jr., who ran as an independent candidate for governor of Virginia. In 2007, she and her partners established D'Amore, Hillsman, Oliver & Barkley, a political consulting firm catering to independent and third-party candidates, as well as mavericks.

As of 2023, she had re-enrolled in the Republican Party and was a contender for chairperson of the Monroe County Republicans.

== Early life and education ==
Oliver has a degree in accounting from the Rochester Institute of Technology. She has worked as a self-employed tax accountant in Rochester, New York.

== Political career ==
In 1993, Oliver co-founded the New York State Independence Party with B. Thomas Golisano and Gordon Black of Harris Interactive. She was state chairwoman of the Independence Party from 1993 to 1998, and organized the state party in almost all the counties in the state.

She was Tom Golisano's campaign chairwoman in his 1994, 1998 and 2002 gubernatorial bids, in which Golisano spent nearly as much as Ross Perot had on his two presidential bids. In the 2002 election, the IPNY won one in seven votes.

In 1994, she was the party's nominee for comptroller of New York State. In 1998, she was the running mate of B. Thomas Golisano for lieutenant governor. The Golisano/Oliver ticket finished third, behind the Republican ticket of Gov. George Pataki and Judge Mary Donohue and the Democratic ticket of New York City Council Speaker Peter Vallone and Brighton Town Supervisor Sandra Frankel.

After leaving the state, she went on to serve in campaigns in numerous other states as a ballot access expert. In 2006, she advised Texas gubernatorial candidate Kinky Friedman.

== Electoral results ==
2002 Results for New York Governor and Lieutenant Governor

- George Pataki and Mary Donohue (R-C) (inc.), 49%
- Carl McCall and Dennis Mehiel (D-WF), 33%
- Tom Golisano and Donohue (I), 14%

1998 Results for New York Governor and Lieutenant Governor

- George Pataki and Mary Donohue (R-C) (inc.), 54%
- Peter Vallone and Sandra Frankel (D-WF), 33%
- Tom Golisano and Laureen Oliver (I), 8%
- Betsy McCaughey Ross and Jonathan C. Reiter (L), 1.4%

1994 Race for New York Comptroller

- Carl McCall (D-L), 45.15%
- Herbert London (R-C-RTL), 40.48%
- Laureen Oliver (I), 1%

Party political offices
Preceded by Dominick Fusco	Independence nominee for Governor of New York; 1998	Succeeded by Mary Donohue
