= Charlie King (politician) =

American attorney, politician, and civic leader

Executive Director of the New York State Democratic Committee
- In office April 2010 – 2015

Administrator of the United States Department of Housing and Urban Development for Region II
- In office 1999–2001
- President: Bill Clinton

Personal details
- Born: June 5, 1959 (age 67) New York City, New York, U.S.
- Party: Democratic
- Education: Brown University (BA); New York University (JD)

Charlie King (born June 5, 1959) is an American attorney, politician, and civic leader in New York City.

== Education ==
After graduating from the Ethical Culture Fieldston School, King earned a bachelor's degree from Brown University in 1981, and a Juris Doctor from the New York University Law School in 1987.

== Career ==
King served as the chairman of the Democratic County Committee in New York County. King was a volunteer attorney for the Mollen Commission in the early-1990s, and was a member of the Election Monitoring Committee in South Africa when Nelson Mandela was elected president in 1994.

In 1999, he was appointed by President Bill Clinton as the regional director for the United States Department of Housing and Urban Development (HUD) for New York and New Jersey, serving in this post until 2001.

King served as the acting Executive Director for National Action Network, Al Sharpton's not-for-profit organization from April 2007 to April 2009. King also represented the witnesses connected to the killing of Sean Bell by the New York City Police Department.

In April 2010, King was appointed executive director of the New York State Democratic Committee. King stepped down from the post to work as a lobbyist at Mercury Public Affairs, a political strategy and consulting firm with offices in Washington, D.C., New York City, Albany, New York, and Sacramento, California.

King is also a frequent host and guest on Keepin' It Real with Al Sharpton. He remains a staunch ally of Governor Andrew Cuomo.

=== Runs for elected office ===
In 1998, King ran for the Democratic nomination for Lieutenant Governor of New York and finished second behind Brighton Town Supervisor Sandra Frankel.

In 2002, King again sought New York's Lieutenant Governorship as the running mate of former HUD Secretary Andrew Cuomo. He and Cuomo dropped out of the race before the primary and endorsed the ticket of State Comptroller Carl McCall and businessman Dennis Mehiel. The Cuomo–King ticket appeared on the 2002 general election ballot as the nominees of the Liberal Party and received less than 50,000 votes, thereby costing the Party its automatic ballot status.

In 2006, King sought New York's Attorney General's office. Andrew Cuomo eventually won the election. King also faced former New York City Public Advocate Mark Green, former U.S. Attorney Denise O'Donnell and former White House Staff Secretary Sean Patrick Maloney in the primary. King dropped out a week before the primary election and endorsed Cuomo. He then went on to serve on Cuomo's Transition Team as chair of the Civil Rights Committee.
