= Independence Party of America =

- Chairman: Frank MacKay
- Founded: September 23, 2007; 19 years ago
- Dissolved: April 2013
- Ideology: Non-partisan democracy Populism

The Independence Party of America (IPA) was a political party in the United States, founded on September 23, 2007 as a coalition of existing state parties bearing the Independence Party name. Its National Chairman was Frank MacKay, chairman of the Independence Party of New York. Dean Barkley, a former United States Senator and Independence Party of Minnesota activist, agreed to play an advisory role with the new party.

The Independence Party of Minnesota voted to affiliate with the new national party at its state convention on January 26, 2008, though it later disafilliated. The Reform Party of Pennsylvania affiliated on October 22, 2007 and the Independent Green Party of Virginia affiliated on January 10, 2008.

The party's website was defunct in April 2013. The various state parties each went their separate ways; for example, in the 2016 presidential election, the Minnesota party endorsed Evan McMullin and the New York party cross-endorsed Libertarian nominee Gary Johnson.

== 2009 legal action ==
A long-standing feud in the party involved John Blare, of the Reform Party of California, and the Reform Party officers.

On December 4, 2009, a New York Federal judge heard MacKay v. Crews on the question of who were the legal Reform Party officers. On December 16, 2009 the judge ruled in favor of David Collison's faction.

Collison said: "After over two years of litigation in Texas and New York, it is my profound pleasure to announce that US District Court Judge Joseph Bianco of the Eastern District of New York has ruled in our favor, and has further reinforced the 2008 ruling of Judge Carl Ginsberg of the 193rd District Court in Texas."
