= Paul Batista =

American poet

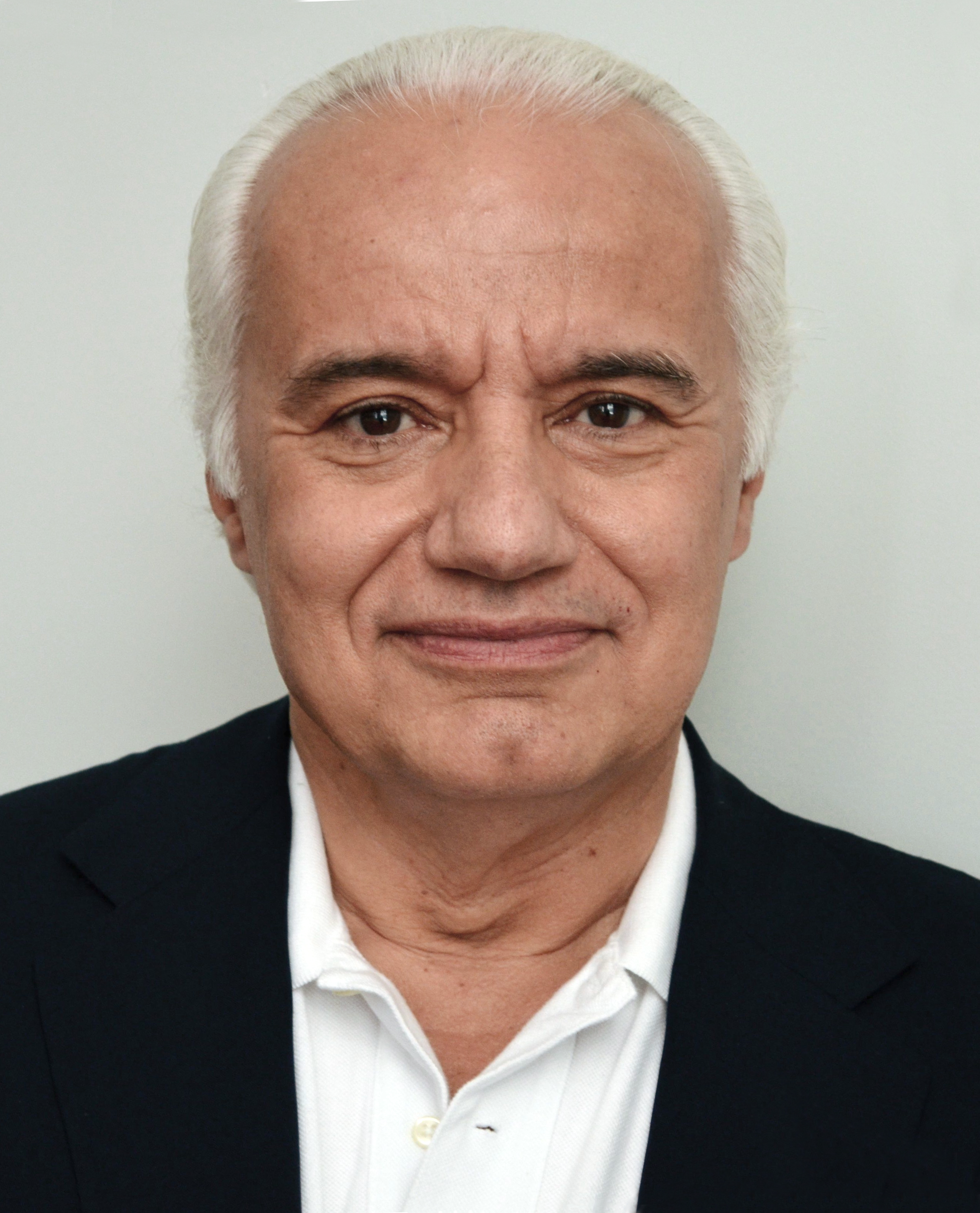
- Batista in 2013
- Born: December 9, 1948 (age 77); Milford, Massachusetts, U.S.
- Education: Bowdoin College; Cornell Law School (JD)
- Occupation: Lawyer
- Known for: Novelist; Television personality

Paul Batista (born December 9, 1948, in Milford, Massachusetts) is a television personality, American novelist and trial lawyer. He is the author of the leading treatise on the federal racketeering statute, Civil RICO Practice Manual published by the international publishing firm Wolters-Kluwer.

As a trial attorney, he specializes in federal criminal litigation. He serves as a guest commentator on the CBS News Network, including, most recently, the trials of El Chapo, the trials of Harvey Weinstein in California and New York, the trial of Derek Chauvin, the former Minnesota police officer convicted of the murder of George Floyd, and the trial and sentencing of Alex Murdaugh in South Carolina. Batista is also a regular on-air legal commentator on Fox News, including the prime time "Crime Nation" broadcast hosted by Nany Grace. In addition to his legal career, he is an actor who has appeared in the HBO movie You Don't Know Jack, which stars Al Pacino as Dr. Jack Kevorkian

Batista's first novel Death's Witness (Sourcebooks Landmark 2006) was awarded a silver medal by the Independent Book Publishers Association in 2007. Death's Witness was reissued in 2012 by Astor + Blue Editions and in 2016 by Oceanview Publishing. It also appeared in June 2016 on USA Today's Best Seller List for books in all formats. It is a legal thriller described by Publishers Weekly as "guilty of delivering not only sharp courtroom drama but steamy romantic escapism as well."

His second novel, Extraordinary Rendition, was released in May 2013 by Astor + Blue Editions and was reissued in April 2016 by Oceanview. Extraordinary Rendition, also an Amazon Best Seller, revolves around the trial of a suspected terrorist brought to the United States for trial.

Batista's third novel, The Borzoi Killings, which involves the trial of a Mexican immigrant accused of the murder of an East Hampton hedge fund billionaire, was published in 2014, also by Astor + Blue Editions, and reissued in March 2016 by Oceanview. All three novels appear as audiobooks produced by Audible.com.

His novel Manhattan Lockdown, a thriller about a sustained ISIS attack on Manhattan published by Oceanview, was released in June 2016. It, too, was a USA Today best-seller. It has been translated into Turkish and in 2018 was published by the major Turkish publishing house Agapi Yaymlaria. “Manhattan Lockdown” also appears in audiobook format distributed by Audible.

Batista's novel, The Warriors, appeared in December 2018. It deals with one of the nation's greatest criminal defense lawyers, Raquel Rematti, and her defense in a criminal trial of a United States Senator, who is also the widow of an assassinated President and who is herself planning a run for the presidency, on federal charges of fund-raising crimes. “The Warriors,” like all Batista's novels, appears as an audiobook through Audible. His most recent novel, "Accusation," revolves around a world-famous actor accused of sexual harassment by aspiring actresses and the actor's intense resistance to those accusations. The hardcover, ebook and Audible versions of “Accusation” appeared in 2022 and the paperback version was published in January 2023. It, too, appears in audiobook format through Audible.

In February and March 2023, National Public Radio (NPR) broadcast nationally a review of "Accusation" by Joan Baum, a prominent book and cultural critic for NPR. According to the broadcast, "Fiction writer and trial attorney Paul Batista knows how to tap into contemporary issues. In his latest legal thriller, 'Accusation,' his sixth novel and the third in his Raquel Rematti crime series, he takes on the #MeToo movement, corruption in the police department and the FBI, and the role of social media in influencing the public about innocence or guilt. Add in some loving lines about the beauties of Central Park and at the very end a surprising plot twist."

Since 1991, Batista has regularly appeared as a guest commentator on legal subjects on Court TV, CNN, HLN, CBS, ABC, and WNBC. He has written articles for The New York Times, The Wall Street Journal, and The National Law Journal. His poetry has been published in literary magazines such as the Atlanta Review, Poetry International, and Parnassus.

He serves as special counsel to The Aleph Institute, a charity that provides legal assistance to Israelis faced with criminal legal issues in the United States. Together with Alan Dershowitz and former United States Attorney General Michael Mukasey, he played a key role in President Donald J. Trump's commutation in December 2017 of the 27 year federal sentence imposed on Sholom Rubashkin, a prominent Jewish philanthropist. Batista is also General Counsel to The committee to Reduce Infection Deaths, a charity devoted to the eradication of deadly bacteria in nursing homes and other congregate living facilities.

Batista, who is the son of Portuguese immigrants, was raised in the Portuguese-American community of southeastern Massachusetts.

He is a 1970 magna cum laude graduate of Bowdoin College, where he was elected to Phi Beta Kappa, and a 1974 graduate of Cornell Law School. He served in the United States Army during the Vietnam War.

Batista's son, Aaron Paul Batista, is a tenured professor in neuroscience at the University of Pittsburgh Medical School. He holds a doctorate from Caltech. Batista's daughter Sara Batista is active in several Jewish organizations and served as the United States Director of the Women's International Zionist Organization, a major Jewish-Israeli charitable group founded, in part, by Hannah Arendt.

Batista is married to Betsy McCaughey, Ph.D. the former Lieutenant Governor of the State of New York, and now a syndicated weekly columnist for the New York Post. Dr. McCaughey is also a frequent guest commentator on the Newsmax Network, the Fox News Network, the BBC and other media outlets. Moreover, Dr. McCaughey is a candidate for Governor of Connecticut in the November 2026 election for that office.

Paul Batista lives in New York City, Greenwich, Connecticut and Sag Harbor, New York. He is a member of the Union League Club of New York City and the New York Athletic Club.

== Works ==
- "Death's Witness." Naperville, IL: Sourcebooks Landmark, 2006. ISBN 9781402206658
- "Civil RICO Practice Manual." New York, New York: John Wiley & Sons, 1997. ISBN 9780471845102
- "Civil RICO Practice Manual (Third Edition)." New York, New York, WoltersKluwer Law and Business. 2008 {ISBN 978-0-7355-6782-5}
- "Extraordinary Rendition." New York, New York, Astor + Blue Editions, 2012. ISBN 9781938231254
- "The Borzoi Killings." New York, New York, Astor + Blue Editions, 2014. ISBN 9781941286012
- "Manhattan Lockdown." Longboat Key, Florida. Oceanview Publishing, 2016. ISBN 9781608091973
- "The Warriors." Sarasota, Florida. Oceanview Publishing, 2018. ISBN 9781608093182
- "Accusation." Sarasota, Florida. Oceanview Publishing. 2021. ISBN 9781608094745
