= Lieutenant Governor of New York =

Second-highest constitutional office in New York State

- Seal of the State of New York

- Flag of the State of New York

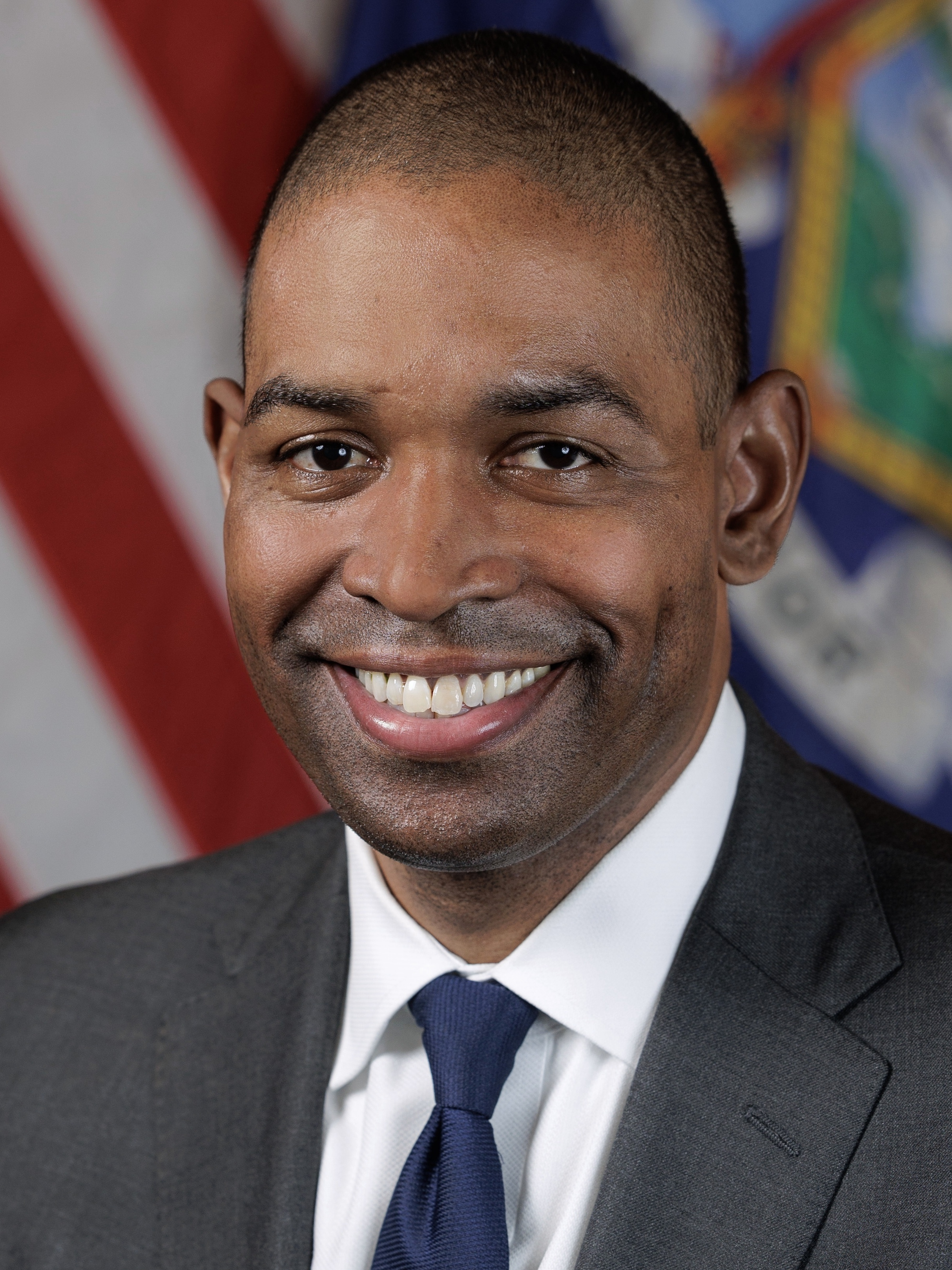
- Incumbent; Antonio Delgado since May 25, 2022
- Government of New York; New York State Senate
- Style: Lieutenant Governor (informal); The Honorable (formal); His Excellency (courtesy); Mr. President (When presiding over Senate)
- Appointer: Primary Election & Governor of New York
- Term length: Four years, no term limit
- Constituting instrument: New York Constitution of 1777
- Inaugural holder: Pierre Van Cortlandt
- Formation: July 30, 1777 (249 years ago)
- Succession: First
- Salary: $220,000 (2023)
- Website: Official website

The lieutenant governor of New York is a constitutional office in the executive branch of the Government of the State of New York. It is the second highest-ranking official in state government. The lieutenant governor is elected on a ticket with the governor for a four-year term. Official duties dictated to the lieutenant governor under the present New York Constitution are to serve as president of the state senate, serve as acting governor in the absence of the governor from the state or the disability of the governor, or to become governor in the event of the governor's death, resignation or removal from office via impeachment. Additional statutory duties of the lieutenant governor are to serve on the New York Court for the Trial of Impeachments, the State Defense Council, and on the board of trustees of the College of Environmental Science and Forestry. The lieutenant governor of New York is the highest-paid lieutenant governor in the United States.

The office is currently held by Antonio Delgado, who was sworn in on May 25, 2022.

== Duties ==
Most lieutenant governors take on other duties as assigned to them by the governor. For example, Mary Donohue took on duties in the areas of small business, school violence, and land-use planning, along with serving as a surrogate speaker for the governor in upstate New York. Donohue's predecessor, Betsy McCaughey Ross, worked on Medicare and education policy, before her falling out with Governor George Pataki. Democrat Stan Lundine, who served under Governor Mario Cuomo, was active on technology and housing issues during his two terms in office.

== Recent campaigns for lieutenant governor ==
=== 1994 election ===
In the 1994 statewide election, Lt. Gov. Stan Lundine sought reelection on the Democratic ticket with Gov. Mario Cuomo. Lieutenant Governor Lundine was unopposed for renomination on the Democratic ticket. In the Republican primary, academic Betsy McCaughey was the only candidate, as nominated by the Republican State Convention. McCaughey was selected as a running mate by state senator George Pataki. The Pataki/McCaughey ticket defeated the Cuomo/Lundine ticket in the general election.

=== 1998 election ===
In 1997, following a falling out for most of their term, Gov. George Pataki dropped Lieutenant Governor Betsy McCaughey Ross from the ticket. Pataki instead nominated Judge Mary Donohue as his running mate. Judge Donohue was unopposed for the Republican nomination.

Several candidates entered the race for the Democratic lieutenant governor nomination. Plattsburgh mayor Clyde Rabideau, Brighton town supervisor Sandra Frankel, Buffalo councilwoman Barbra Kavenugh, and attorney Charlie King of Rockland County announced their candidacies for the nomination. Councilwoman Kavanaugh withdrew from the race at the Democratic State Convention. Mayor Rabideau was selected as a running mate by New York City Council speaker Peter Vallone, and Supervisor Frankel was selected as a running mate by Brooklyn district attorney Charles Hynes during the state convention. King received enough support to qualify for the September primary ballot and continued his race. Supervisor Frankel won the Democratic lieutenant governor primary and was paired in the general election with Speaker Vallone.

Lieutenant Governor McCaughey Ross, who was running for governor as the Liberal Party nominee, was paired with Jonathan Reiter as a running mate. Independence Party nominee Tom Golisano ran with Laureen Oliver. The Green Party nominee, actor Al Lewis, ran with Alice Green.

The Pataki/Donohue ticket defeated the Vallone/Frankel and the Golisano/Oliver tickets.

=== 2002 election ===
Reports in early 2002 said that Governor Pataki was considered dropping Lieutenant Governor Donohue from the ticket and asking her to run for New York State attorney general instead. The reports said he had considered New York secretary of state Randy Daniels and Erie County executive Joel Giambra as replacement running mates, but eventually Lieutenant Governor Donohue would join Governor Pataki again on the Republican ticket.

The Democratic field started with 1998 nominee Sandra Frankel, 1998 candidate Charlie King, businessman Dennis Mehiel, Westchester County Legislature chairman George Latimer and former New York City consumer affairs commissioner Jane Steiner Hoffman. Commissioner Hoffman dropped out of the race for medical reasons, and both Latimer and Frankel dropped out for party unity. State comptroller Carl McCall selected Mehiel as his running mate and former HUD secretary Andrew Cuomo selected King as a running mate. A week before the September primary, Secretary Cuomo and King withdrew from their primaries and endorsed the McCall and Mehiel ticket.

The Independence Party had a contested primary battle for lieutenant governor. Lieutenant Governor Donohue faced an Independence Party member aligned with gubernatorial candidate Tom Golisano in the primary, but won the primary, while Governor Pataki lost the Independence primary for governor to Golisano. This made Donohue the running mate for both Pataki and Golisano in November.

The Green Party nominated Jennifer Daniels for lieutenant governor on a ticket with Stanley Aronowitz.

The Pataki/Donohue ticket defeated the McCall and Mehiel and the Golisano and Donohue tickets in November.

=== 2006 election ===
Lieutenant Governor Donohue announced that she would not run for a third term in 2006. The race to succeed her drew eight major party candidates. State Senate minority leader David Paterson of Harlem won the Democratic nomination. Rockland County executive C. Scott Vanderhoef won the Republican nomination. The Green Party candidate was Alison Duncan.

Candidates for the Democratic lieutenant governor nomination were attorney Leecia Eve of Buffalo, Assemblyman Thomas DiNapoli of Nassau County, Jon Cohen of Nassau County and Wappinger town supervisor Joseph Ruggiero of Dutchess County, New York. Candidates for the Republican nomination for lieutenant governor were New York secretary of state Christopher Jacobs of Buffalo, town supervisor Tim Demler of Wheatfield, and former state senator Nancy Larraine Hoffmann of Madison County.

The Democratic ticket of Attorney General Eliot Spitzer and David Paterson defeated the Republican ticket of Assemblymember John Faso and Scott Vanderhoef ticket in the election for Governor and Lieutenant Governor on November 7.

=== 2008 vacancy and 2009 appointment ===
Lieutenant Governor David Paterson succeeded to the governorship of New York after Eliot Spitzer resigned on March 17, 2008, creating a vacancy in the office of lieutenant governor. The duties of lieutenant governor were then performed successively by temporary presidents of the State Senate Joseph Bruno, Dean Skelos, Malcolm Smith and, during the 2009 New York State Senate leadership crisis, Pedro Espada Jr.

On July 8, 2009, before the recapture of senate control by the Democrats, Governor Paterson appointed Richard Ravitch to the position of lieutenant governor to resolve the month-long political stalemate in the state senate. However, Attorney General Andrew Cuomo warned Paterson before Ravitch's selection that such an appointment would be unconstitutional. Litigation concerning the appointment's constitutionality was filed in New York State's courts by the Republican Senate caucus on July 9. A preliminary ruling by Justice William R. LaMarca on July 21 upheld AG Cuomo. On August 20, a four-judge panel of the Appellate Division (2nd Dept.) rejected unanimously the appointment. However, on September 22, in a "stunning reversal," the New York Court of Appeals, ruled in a 4–3 decision that Paterson's appointment was constitutional.

=== 2021 vacancy and appointment ===
Upon the resignation of Governor Andrew Cuomo in August 2021, Lt. Governor Kathy Hochul succeeded him, with Andrea Stewart-Cousins becoming acting lieutenant governor. Hochul then picked state senator Brian Benjamin for lieutenant governor, a position he filled on September 9, 2021.

=== 2022 vacancy and appointment ===
Upon the resignation of Lt. Governor Brian Benjamin on April 12, 2022, due to federal corruption charges, Andrea Stewart-Cousins became acting lieutenant governor for the second time. Governor Hochul later appointed Antonio Delgado to fill the vacancy, and Delgado was sworn in on May 25, 2022.

== See also ==
- Politics of New York (state)
- List of lieutenant governors of New York
- List of current United States lieutenant governors
- New York gubernatorial elections (to see results for the elections of Lieutenant Governors of New York)
