= Sandra Frankel =

American politician

Sandra L. Frankel
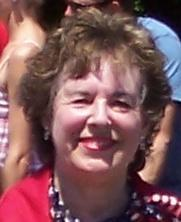

Brighton, New York Town Supervisor
- In office January 1, 1992 – December 31, 2011
- Preceded by: Donald H. Conners
- Succeeded by: William W. Moehle

Personal details
- Born: 1941 (age 84–85) Miami, Florida, U.S.
- Party: Democratic
- Spouse: Neil Frankel
- Children: 3
- Education: Tulane University
- Profession: Speech pathologist
- Website: www.sandrafrankel.com

Sandra L. Frankel is the former Supervisor of the Town of Brighton, Monroe County, New York. A former Brighton school board member (6 years) and BOCES I Monroe Board of Education (10 years), Vice President of both, Frankel served for 20 years as town supervisor, the elected executive of an urban suburb of 35,000 population.

In 1998, Frankel won the Democratic nomination for Lieutenant Governor of New York in the 1998 statewide Primary Election. She lost the general election on a ticket with then New York City Council Speaker Peter Vallone. Republican Mary Donohue won the lieutenant governorship on a ticket with George Pataki.

In 2002, Frankel sought the lieutenant governorship again, but dropped out to foster party unity and endorsed Dennis Mehiel, who lost the general election on a ticket with State Comptroller Carl McCall.

Frankel was one of many names mentioned as a potential candidate for the New York's 29th congressional district election, 2010. She declined to run, leaving the race to Matthew Zeller.

In 2011, Frankel was the Democratic nominee for Monroe County Executive. She lost the race to incumbent Maggie Brooks, 57%-43%. She was again Democratic nominee for Monroe County Executive in 2015. She lost to County Clerk Cheryl DiNolfo 59%-41%.

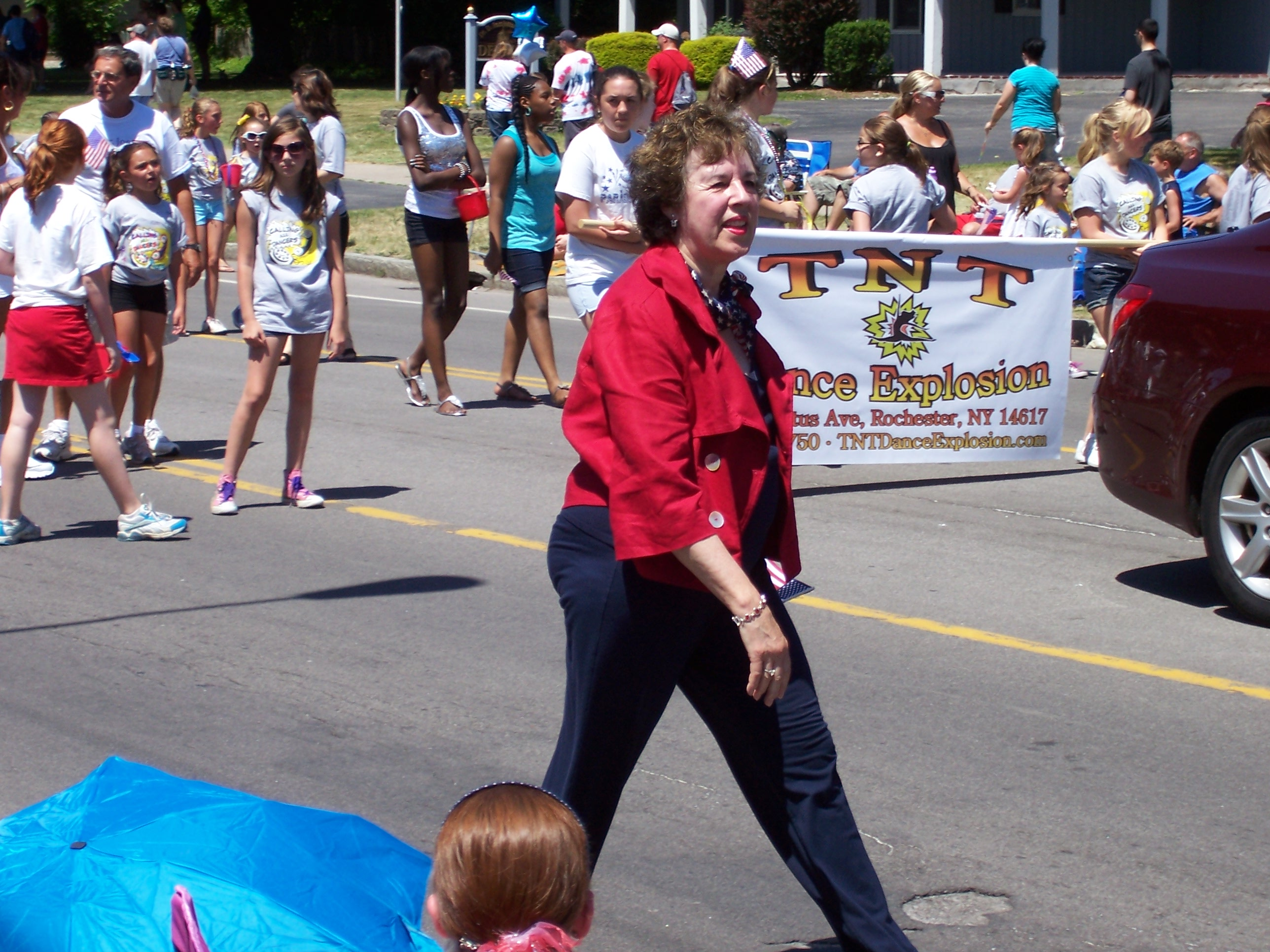
Frankel walking in the 2011 Independence Day parade in Irondequoit, New York

== 1998 NYS Democratic ticket ==
- Governor: Peter Vallone
- Lieutenant Governor: Sandra Frankel
- Comptroller: Carl McCall
- Attorney General: Eliot Spitzer
- U.S. Senate: Charles Schumer

== Electoral history ==
1998 Results for NYS Governor and Lieutenant Governor

- George Pataki and Mary Donohue (R-C) (inc.), 54%
- Peter Vallone and Sandra Frankel (D-WF), 33%
- Tom Golisano and Laureen Oliver (I), 8%
- Betsy McCaughey Ross and Jonathan C. Reiter (L), 1.4%

Political offices
Preceded by Donald H. Conners	Brighton, New York Town Supervisor; January 1, 1992 – December 31, 2011	Succeeded by William W. Moehle
Party political offices
Preceded by Stanley N. Lundine	Democratic Nominee for Lieutenant Governor of New York; 1998	Succeeded by Dennis Mehiel (2002)
