= Long Island Association =

The Long Island Association (LIA) is an organization representing businesses in the Long Island region. The LIA's members together employ two-thirds of Long Island's workforce. The LIA was founded in July 1926 as the Long Island Chamber of Commerce to promote business relocation from New York City. The LIA headquarters remained in Manhattan until 1949; it is now based in Melville.

Former presidents included William J. Casey, later CIA Director under President Ronald Reagan, and James Lacrocca, former New York State Commissioner of Energy and Transportation. As of November 2023, it is led by Matt Cohen.
