= Stan Lundine =

American politician (born 1939)

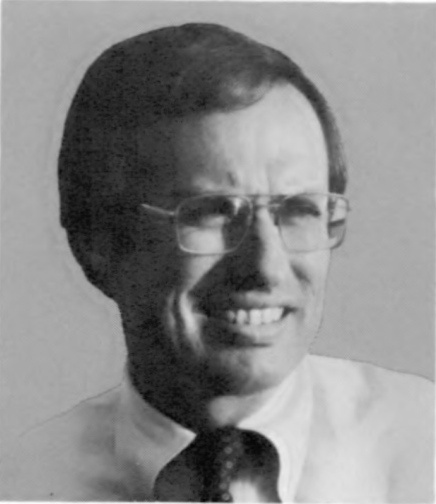

Lieutenant Governor of New York
- In office January 1, 1987 – December 31, 1994
- Governor: Mario Cuomo
- Preceded by: Warren M. Anderson (acting)
- Succeeded by: Betsy McCaughey

Member of the U.S. House of Representatives from New York
- In office March 2, 1976 – December 31, 1986
- Preceded by: James F. Hastings
- Succeeded by: Amo Houghton
- Constituency: 39th district (1976–1983); 34th district (1983–1986)

18th Mayor of Jamestown
- In office 1970–1976
- Preceded by: Charles Magnuson
- Succeeded by: Steven Carlson

Personal details
- Born: Stanley Nelson Lundine; February 4, 1939 (age 87) Jamestown, New York, U.S.
- Party: Democratic
- Spouse: Sara Lundine
- Education: Duke University (BA); New York University (LLB)

Stanley Nelson Lundine (born February 4, 1939) is an American politician from Jamestown, New York who served as the mayor of Jamestown, a United States representative, and the lieutenant governor of New York.

== Life and career ==
Lundine graduated from Duke University in 1961 and from the New York University School of Law in 1964.

=== Congress ===
A Democrat, Lundine served as Mayor of Jamestown, New York from 1970 until 1976, when he was elected to the U.S. House of Representatives.

While mayor, Jamestown received national attention as a result of his Labor Management strategy. Jamestown, long the center of labor strife, became a model for labor/management co-operation. As a Congressman, Lundine brought his labor/management ideas to Washington, and was instrumental in developing legislation that created labor/management councils and employee stock ownership plans. He focused on finance, banking and economic development policy, and also served on the Science Committee. He was a subcommittee chairman on the House Banking Committee.

Lundine is the only Democrat to have represented the Western Southern Tier in Congress in the 20th century, and no other Democrats would do so until Democrats Brian Higgins and Eric Massa won both portions of the now-divided district in 2005 and 2009 respectively.

=== Lt. Governor ===
In 1986, Lundine declined to seek reelection to Congress. Instead, he ran for and was elected to be the Lieutenant Governor of New York, running alongside Mario Cuomo, who became governor in 1986. They were re-elected in 1990.

In 1994, Cuomo and Lundine were defeated for reelection by George Pataki and Betsy McCaughey Ross.

== Sources ==
- United States Congress. "Stan Lundine (id: L000516)". Biographical Directory of the United States Congress.
- Appearances on C-SPAN
- Paterson, David "Black, Blind, & In Charge: A Story of Visionary Leadership and Overcoming Adversity."Skyhorse Publishing. New York, New York, 2020

U.S. House of Representatives
Preceded by James F. Hastings	Member of the U.S. House of Representatives from New York's 39th congressional district 1979–2005	Constituency abolished
Preceded by Frank Horton	Member of the U.S. House of Representatives from New York's 34th congressional district 1983–1986	Succeeded by Amo Houghton
Party political offices
Preceded by Alfred DelBello	Democratic nominee for Lieutenant Governor of New York; 1986, 1990, 1994	Succeeded by Sandra Frankel
Political offices
Preceded by Warren M. Anderson; Acting	Lieutenant Governor of New York; 1987–1994	Succeeded by Betsy McCaughey
U.S. order of precedence (ceremonial)
Preceded by Norman D'Amours as Former U.S. Representative	Order of precedence of the United States as Former U.S. Representative	Succeeded by Robert J. Mrazek as Former U.S. Representative
