= Betsy McCaughey =

American politician

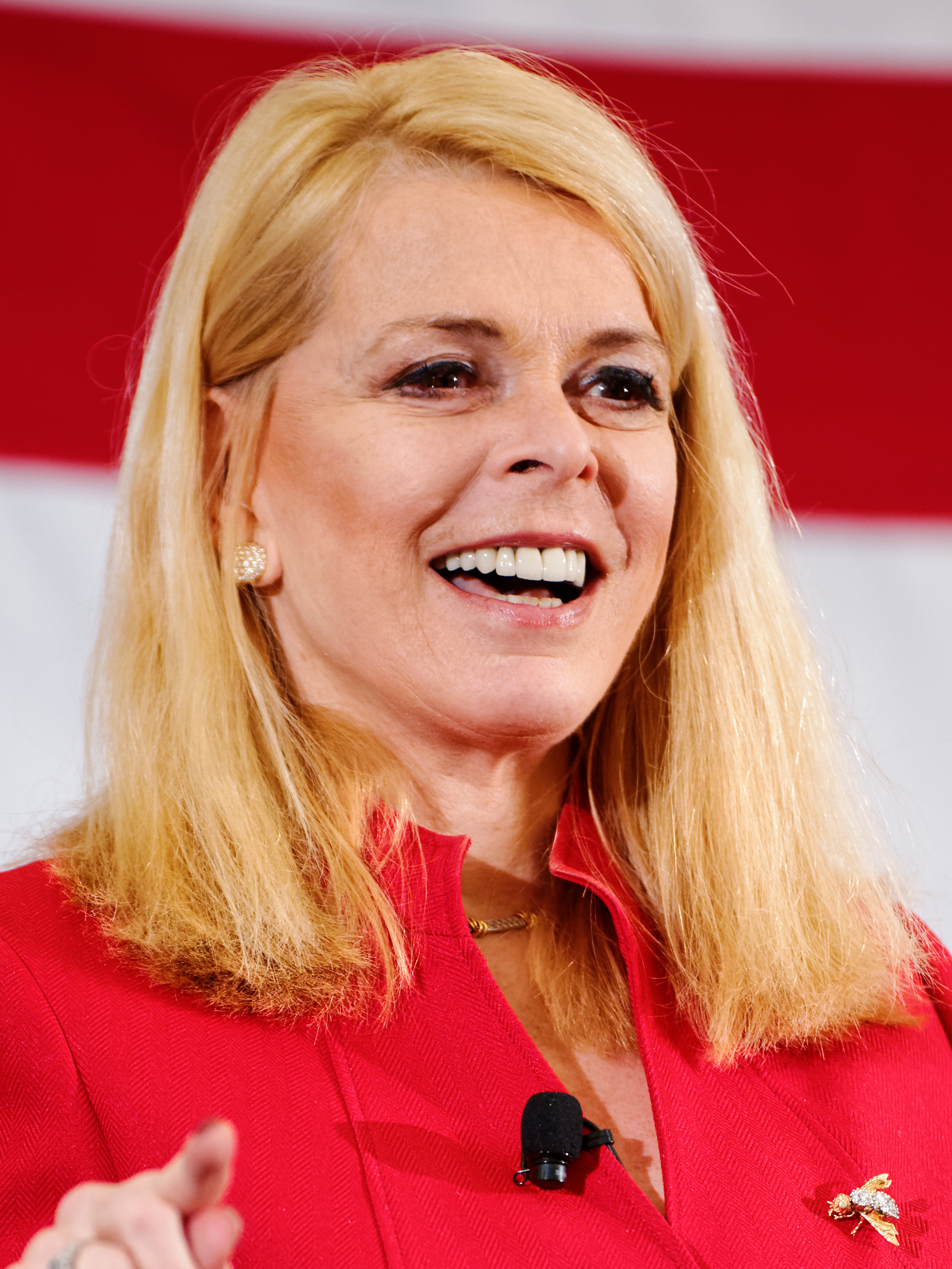
- McCaughey in 2015

Lieutenant Governor of New York
- In office January 1, 1995 – December 31, 1998
- Governor: George Pataki
- Preceded by: Stan Lundine
- Succeeded by: Mary Donohue

Personal details
- Born: Elizabeth Helen Peterken; October 20, 1948 (age 78) Pittsburgh, Pennsylvania, U.S.
- Party: Republican (before 1997, 2010–present); Democratic (1997–2010)
- Spouses: Thomas McCaughey (m. 1972; div. 1994); Wilbur Ross (m. 1995; div. 2000); Paul Batista (m. 2018)
- Children: 3
- Education: Vassar College (BA); Columbia University (MA, PhD)

Elizabeth Helen McCaughey (/məˈkɔɪ/; born October 20, 1948), formerly known as Betsy McCaughey Ross, is an American politician who was the lieutenant governor of New York from 1995 to 1998 under Governor George Pataki. She unsuccessfully sought the Democratic Party nomination for governor after Pataki dropped her from his 1998 ticket, and she ended up on the ballot under the Liberal Party line. In August 2016, Donald Trump's presidential campaign announced that she had joined the campaign as an economic adviser. She was an unsuccessful candidate for governor of Connecticut in 2026.

McCaughey has been a fellow at the conservative Manhattan Institute and Hudson Institute thinktanks and has written numerous articles and op-eds. She was a member of the boards of directors of medical equipment companies Genta (from 2001 to 2007) and Cantel Medical Corporation, but she resigned in 2009 to avoid the appearance of conflict of interest with her public advocacy against the Affordable Care Act.

== Early life, education, and family ==
McCaughey and her twin brother, William, were born in Pittsburgh to Ramona Peterken, and her husband Albert, a factory janitor. The family moved around the Northeastern United States for six years before it settled down in Westport, Connecticut, where McCaughey's father did maintenance and later engineering work at a nail clipper factory. McCaughey recalled her parents' difficulty in affording medical treatment: "my brother was a serious asthmatic as a child. I remember my parents sitting at the kitchen table wondering if they could afford to take [him] to the hospital."

McCaughey attended public schools in Westport through the 10th grade. After receiving a scholarship, she transferred to a private Massachusetts boarding school, the Mary A. Burnham School, for her last two years of high school, rarely visiting home, then or during her college years.

She received a scholarship to attend Vassar College, where she majored in history. She wrote her senior thesis on Karl Marx and Alexis de Tocqueville and received her AB in 1970. McCaughey went on to graduate school at Columbia University in New York City, earning her MA in 1972 and her PhD in constitutional history in 1976.

She won Columbia's Bancroft Dissertation Award in American History in 1976 and her dissertation was published by Columbia University Press in 1980, From Loyalist to Founding Father: The Political Odyssey of William Samuel Johnson.

She also contributed a chapter about Johnson to the 1979 book The American Revolution: Changing Perspectives by William M. Fowler and Wallace Coyle.

McCaughey's father died in 1970 at the age of 60. Her mother, an alcoholic, died the next year of liver disease at the age of 42. In 1972, she married Thomas K. McCaughey, a Yale College graduate she had met in college. He was then moving up as an investment banker. The McCaugheys separated in 1992 and divorced in 1994, with McCaughey and her ex-spouse sharing joint custody of their three daughters. In January 1993, she filed an affidavit in her divorce proceeding in which she said she had no annual earnings from employment during most of the 18 years of her marriage to Thomas, and she had never earned more than $20,000 per year except in 1990, when she "sold an idea to Fox television for a windfall once-in-a-lifetime sum of $75,000".

She married wealthy investment banker Wilbur Ross Jr. in December 1995. He filed for divorce in November 1998.

== Academic work, 1977–1988 ==
McCaughey taught history as a visiting assistant professor at Vassar College in 1977–1978 and was a lecturer in 1979–1980. She was an assistant professor between 1981 and 1983, teaching two classes per year, both at Columbia University Between 1983 and 1984, she had a National Endowment for the Humanities postdoctoral fellowship. From 1986 to 1988, she served as a guest curator at the New-York Historical Society and was responsible for the museum's exhibit commemorating the bicentennial of the US Constitution. She also authored a book, Government by Choice: Inventing the United States Constitution, which cataloged the exhibit.

== Policy positions and scholarship, 1989–1993 ==
In the late 1980s, McCaughey briefly considered a career in TV news, but she opted instead for a position as a senior scholar at the Center for the Study of the Presidency, serving from 1989 to 1992. There, she wrote an article, book reviews, and a guest editorial for its journal, Presidential Studies Quarterly (PSQ), and an op-ed in USA Today advocating reform of the Electoral College method of electing the president. She testified at a July 22, 1992, hearing before the United States Senate Judiciary Subcommittee on the Constitution and helped produce a report suggesting constitutional amendments to fix perceived flaws in the Electoral College.

McCaughey also wrote op-ed columns that appeared in The Wall Street Journal, The New York Times, and USA Today in which she opposed plans involving local and state redistricting to comply with the Voting Rights Act, and she criticized federal court-ordered desegregation of schools in Connecticut and New Jersey. She also supported the nomination of a federal judge, Clarence Thomas to the United States Supreme Court by arguing that he would judge cases there on their merits and not tend to interpret cases in a manner consistent with his conservative beliefs; She also supported a tobacco company in litigation before the Supreme Court and praised the 1992 Planned Parenthood v. Casey Supreme Court decision, restricting abortion rights.

In February 1993, the John M. Olin Foundation funded a fellowship at the Manhattan Institute, a conservative think tank, for McCaughey to write a book on race and the legal system to be titled Beyond Pluralism: Overcoming the Narcissism of Minor Differences. McCaughey wrote op-eds over the next six months in The Wall Street Journal and USA Today in which she supported the 1993 selection of a jury from predominately-white, Republican, rural counties for the urban (Memphis)-located retrial of African American and Democratic US Representative Harold Ford, Sr., and praised the 1993 Shaw v. Reno Supreme Court decision, favoring five white voters who said their rights had been infringed upon by redistricting that had been done to comply with the Voting Rights Act.

== Healthcare reform, 1993–1994 ==
On September 22, 1993, US President Bill Clinton delivered a nationally televised speech about his healthcare reform plan to a joint session of Congress. From September 28 to 30, 1993, First Lady Hillary Clinton, the architect of the universal health care plan, testified about its details before five US congressional committees. The cost of providing insurance for the estimated 37 million people then uninsured was to be covered in part by new taxes on tobacco. On the last day of Hillary Clinton's testimony, The Wall Street Journal published an op-ed by McCaughey, who wrote that the 239-page draft legislation differed markedly from the White House's public statements and would have "devastating consequences". Citing words and phrases from the draft, she argued that the 77 percent of Americans then covered by insurance would see a downgrade in their policies, and most would not be able to keep their own physicians but be forced into price-controlled health maintenance organizations (HMOs), which would provide only the most basic care. According to McCaughey, the HMO plans would not pay for visits to specialists or for second opinions, and most physicians would be driven out of private practice.

In late November 1993, the bill for the Clinton health care plan of 1993 was introduced in the Congress and made publicly available. The Wall Street Journal then published an op-ed by McCaughey in which said she had pored over the entire bill and concluded that it had price controls that would cause rationing, and the bill was dangerous.

McCaughey expanded her op-eds into a five-page article titled "No Exit", which appeared as the cover story in The New Republic and was published a few days before President Clinton's 1994 State of the Union address. An internal memo by tobacco company Philip Morris, dated March 1994, indicated that representatives of Philip Morris had collaborated with McCaughey when she was writing "No Exit": "Worked off-the-record with Manhattan and writer Betsy McCaughey as part of the input to the three-part exposé in The New Republic on what the Clinton plan means to you. The first part detailed specifics of the plan." (When the memo was discussed in a 2009 story in Rolling Stone, McCaughey declined to comment.)

McCaughey's "No Exit" article was quickly used by conservative officials and commentators seeking to discredit the Clinton plan. Senator Bob Dole, in the Republican Party response to the President's State of the Union, used some of McCaughey's arguments of fewer choices, lower quality, and more government control. Bill Kristol's Project for the Republican Future quickly launched television advertisements featuring quotes from McCaughey's two Wall Street Journal op-ed columns and her The New Republic article. Newsweek columnist George Will used McCaughey's writings as a basis for predicting that the Clinton health plan would kill patients and make it illegal for patients to pay doctors directly for care, with 15-year jail terms for patients who tried to do so.

The Clinton White House press office issued a response to McCaughey's "No Exit" article by arguing that it contained "numerous factual inaccuracies and misleading statements". McCaughey responded that her claims came "straight from the text of the bill". Supporters of the Clinton plan questioned McCaughey's claims, including her statements that "the law will prevent you from going outside the system to buy basic health coverage you think is better" and that "doctor[s] can be paid only by the plan, not by you" by pointing to the text of the legislation such as Section 1003: "Nothing in this Act shall be construed as prohibiting ... An individual from purchasing any health care services."

According to The Washington Post, the "No Exit" article, the White House response, and the ensuing television and radio interviews with McCaughey made her a star: "Her toothy good looks, body-conscious suits, Vassar BA and Columbia PhD reduced right-wingers to mush."

The bill stalled and died in Congress in 1994, and the next year, Clinton was reduced to asking Congress for a series of small, incremental reforms to healthcare. The "No Exit" article won the National Magazine Award for excellence in the public interest. Andrew Sullivan, the editor of The New Republic, later stated that he believed there were flaws in McCaughey's article, but he ran it "as a provocation to debate". In 2006, a new editor recanted the story.

In 2009, The Daily Beast called her "The Woman Who Killed Health Care". In a 2010 article about misinformation surrounding healthcare reform efforts in the United States, political scientist Brendan Nyhan argued that McCaughey's articles about Clinton's healthcare reform were both highly influential in shaping debate on the subject and misleading, owing in part to "egregious errors" she made in reading and interpreting the proposals.

== New York Lieutenant Governorship, 1995–1998 ==
After winning the election, Pataki told The New York Times, McCaughey would have "very real and significant responsibilities" as lieutenant governor. McCaughey was initially tasked by Pataki to work on education policy and on reducing New York's Medicaid budget. By January 1995, McCaughey had produced a set of recommendations that required cost cutting by hospitals and nursing homes so that the poor did not have to bear the entire burden of balancing the state's Medicaid budget by a reduction of their benefits. However, McCaughey's recommendations were largely ignored.

After Pataki refused to give McCaughey permission to conduct a study into child abuse, she did one anyway and publicly announced its results. In March 1996, The New York Times reported that McCaughey was locked out of the governor's inner circle because she had violated the "unwritten rules" of the conventional lieutenant governor's role. Rather than following protocol as lieutenant governor by taking a seat with everyone else during Pataki's State of the State address to the legislature in 1996, McCaughey stood for the entire 56 min speech's length, further attracting attention to herself at her governor's expense. In the spring of 1997, Governor Pataki announced that McCaughey would not be his running mate when he ran for re-election in 1998. He later selected New York State Supreme Court Justice Mary Donohue to replace her.

Though she had always voted Republican in presidential elections and taken conservative Republican policy positions, McCaughey suddenly switched her party affiliation to Democrat and soon announced plans to run for governor against Pataki. McCaughey was the early frontrunner for her new party's nomination process, in part because of her statewide name and face recognition and in part because of the financial support of her wealthy then-husband. During her campaign for governor, she was criticized for firing a succession of campaign aides and political advisers and possibly changing her core political beliefs in order to appear more electable to New York voters. As her opinion poll numbers sank, her husband took away more than half of the funds he had pledged to her campaign.

McCaughey was defeated in the Democratic primary election by New York City Councilman Peter Vallone (who then lost the general election to Pataki, 54 percent to 33 percent). McCaughey had earlier received the nomination of the Liberal Party of New York for governor and stayed in the general election. McCaughey's campaign attracted little support, and she received only 1.65 percent of the general vote for governor. Following the election, she divorced and then sued her former husband alleging "$40 million fraud", claiming that he promised to fund her campaign unconditionally.

== Life and career since leaving office ==
McCaughey has worked on patient advocacy and healthcare policy issues since leaving office in 1999. She was a member of the board of directors of Genta, a company focused on the delivery of products for cancer treatment from 2001 to her resignation in October 2007. She was also a member of the board of directors of the Cantel Medical Corporation, a medical device manufacturer, from 2005 to her resignation in August 2009 to avoid the appearance a conflict of interest while she was engaged in advocacy on healthcare reform legislation.

In 2004, she founded the committee to Reduce Infection Deaths (RID) in reaction to a rise in antibiotic-resistant Staphylococcus aureus and other hospital-borne infections. The non-profit RID is "devoted solely to providing safer, cleaner, hospital care". She remains the chair and representative of the organization.

=== Healthcare reform, 2007–2009 ===
In August 2007, the American Cancer Society dedicated $15 million to a public awareness campaign on inadequate access to healthcare for the 47 million Americans not covered by insurance. It claimed that there would be a greater decline in cancer deaths if more cases of cancer were diagnosed in the early stages. The society noted that studies had shown that patients without insurance were more than twice as likely to have their cancer diagnosed in the late stages of the disease. One of the cancer society's commercials stated, "We're making progress, but it's not enough if people don't have access to the care that could save their lives."

McCaughey criticized the campaign, saying that it should instead refocus on educating people about cancer prevention and detection. She argued that evidence had shown that the US had higher rates of cancer survival than countries with universal healthcare coverage because of shorter wait times for treatment, better availability of new drugs for therapy, and more frequent cancer screenings. She expanded her argument into a "Brief Analysis" published the following month by the National Center for Policy Analysis in which she maintained that the US was number one in the world in cancer care. Sources for her analysis included a paper from the National Bureau of Economic Research, a non profit, non partisan research organization, and an article in the British medical journal Lancet Oncology, which analyzed 2000–2002 cancer survival figures from Europe. The American Cancer Society responded by citing a study of nearly 600,000 cancer cases that concluded that compared to people with private insurance, uninsured patients in the US were 1.6 times more likely to die within five years of their diagnosis.

=== 2009 stimulus bill ===
McCaughey published an op-ed on February 9, 2009, and claimed that the Obama administration's pending American Recovery and Reinvestment Act of 2009 stimulus contained the Health Information Technology for Economic and Clinical Health Act, hidden provisions that would harm the health of Americans as well as the healthcare sector of the economy. She argued that the bill would establish two powerful new bureaucracies: the National Coordinator for Health Information Technology and the Federal Coordinating Council for Comparative Effectiveness Research.

McCaughey said the National Coordinator would monitor patients' electronic medical records to ensure that doctors and hospitals treated patients in a way that "the federal government deems appropriate and cost effective" and that doctors and hospitals deviating from the government's "electronically delivered protocols" would be penalized. She said that the Federal Coordinating Council would be composed of appointed bureaucrats charged with a costcutting agenda that would slow the development of new medical products and drugs and ration healthcare for senior citizens. She opined that the bureaucrats would use a comparative effectiveness formula, which, in the United Kingdom, had resulted in a requirement that senior citizens go blind in one eye before the government would pay for a treatment to save the sight in the other eye.

Critics claimed McCaughey's claims were distorted, pointing out that the National Coordinator was not new but had been created five years earlier by George W. Bush and that the 2009 legislation was not about limiting doctors' ability to prescribe treatments but instead establishing a system of electronic records to give physicians complete and accurate information their patients.

FactCheck.org noted that comparative effectiveness research had been funded by the US government for years but agreed with McCaughey that there would be penalties for health providers that did not use the electronic records system. The effectiveness research council was a new initiative, as McCaughey had said. However, supporters of the stimulus bill provision said that research funded would provide additional evidence to guide treatment decisions and save lives and money by avoiding unnecessary, ineffective, or risky treatments.

McCaughey's viewpoint was soon echoed and extended by conservative talk show host Rush Limbaugh and multiple Fox News Channel broadcasters. Republican US Representative Charles Boustany Jr. of Louisiana, a heart surgeon, added that he feared that comparative effectiveness research would be misused by federal bureaucrats to "ration care, to deny life-saving treatment to seniors and disabled people". Other conservatives agreed that the legislation could put the federal government in the middle of the doctor-patient relationship.

=== 2009 healthcare reform bills ===
McCaughey opposed the America's Affordable Health Choices Act of 2009 debated in Congress in 2009. She made allegations about certain provisions of the bills that provided for Medicare payments to physicians for end-of-life and living will counseling and about Ezekiel Emanuel, then an adviser to the Obama administration's budget director and chairman of the bioethics department at the National Institutes of Health. McCaughey's claims may have inspired Sarah Palin's more high-profile claims that the legislation would lead to so-called death panels. The provisions in the legislation that McCaughey advocated against were removed from the bill before it became law.

In July 2009, McCaughey claimed that a section in the pending healthcare legislation, "Advance Care Planning Consultation", actually prescribed "euthanasia for the elderly" because it included provisions that

would make it mandatory—absolutely require—that every five years people in Medicare have a required counseling session that will tell them how to end their life sooner [and inform them how to] decline nutrition, how to decline being hydrated, how to go in to hospice care ... all to do what's in society's best interest or in your family's best interest and cut your life short.

McCaughey's choice of words and analysis were described by The Atlantic's James Fallows as inaccurate and sensationalistic. Politifact responded that the end-of-life counseling was voluntary, calling McCaughey's claim a "ridiculous falsehood" and giving it their lowest accuracy rating, "pants on fire". Factcheck.org called the claims "nonsense" and stated that what that section of the bill would actually do is "require Medicare to pay for voluntary counseling sessions helping seniors to plan for end-of-life medical care, including designating a health care proxy, choosing a hospice and making decisions about life-sustaining treatment." During an appearance on The Daily Show with Jon Stewart which aired on August 20, 2009, McCaughey repeated these assertions about the counselling sessions and referred to the Factcheck.org as "spot-check dot org", claiming they failed to adequately read the House health care bill. In a rebuttal, Factcheck.org stood by their analysis and provided further analysis, which led them to conclude that McCaughey had misinterpreted the bill.

In August 2009, WNYC's On the Media also addressed McCaughey's claims, concluding that the provision actually mandated that the federal government compensate "counseling sessions" on elder law, such as estate planning, "will writing and hospice care".

McCaughey described Emanuel in a New York Post opinion article as a "Deadly Doctor" who advocated healthcare rationing by age and disability. Factcheck.org said this was incorrect and that "Emanuel's meaning is being twisted ... he was talking about a philosophical trend, and ... writing about how to make the most ethical choices when forced to choose which patients get organ transplants or vaccines when supplies are limited." An article in Time magazine said that Emanuel "was only addressing extreme cases like organ donation, where there is an absolute scarcity of resources", and quoted Emanuel as saying: "My quotes were just being taken out of context." The New York Times noted that Emanuel had opposed the legalization of euthanasia or physician-assisted suicide when such proposals were being debated in the late 1990s.

McCaughey resigned from the Board of Cantel Medical Corporation on August 20, 2009 "to avoid any appearance of a conflict of interest during the national debate over healthcare reform", according to a press release by the company. Other reports claimed that she resigned after negative reactions to her performance on The Daily Show with Jon Stewart one day earlier.

In an appearance on MSNBC's Morning Meeting on October 6, 2009, McCaughey advocated gradually extending the minimum age for Medicare coverage upward from 65 to 70 in order to keep the Medicare system solvent.

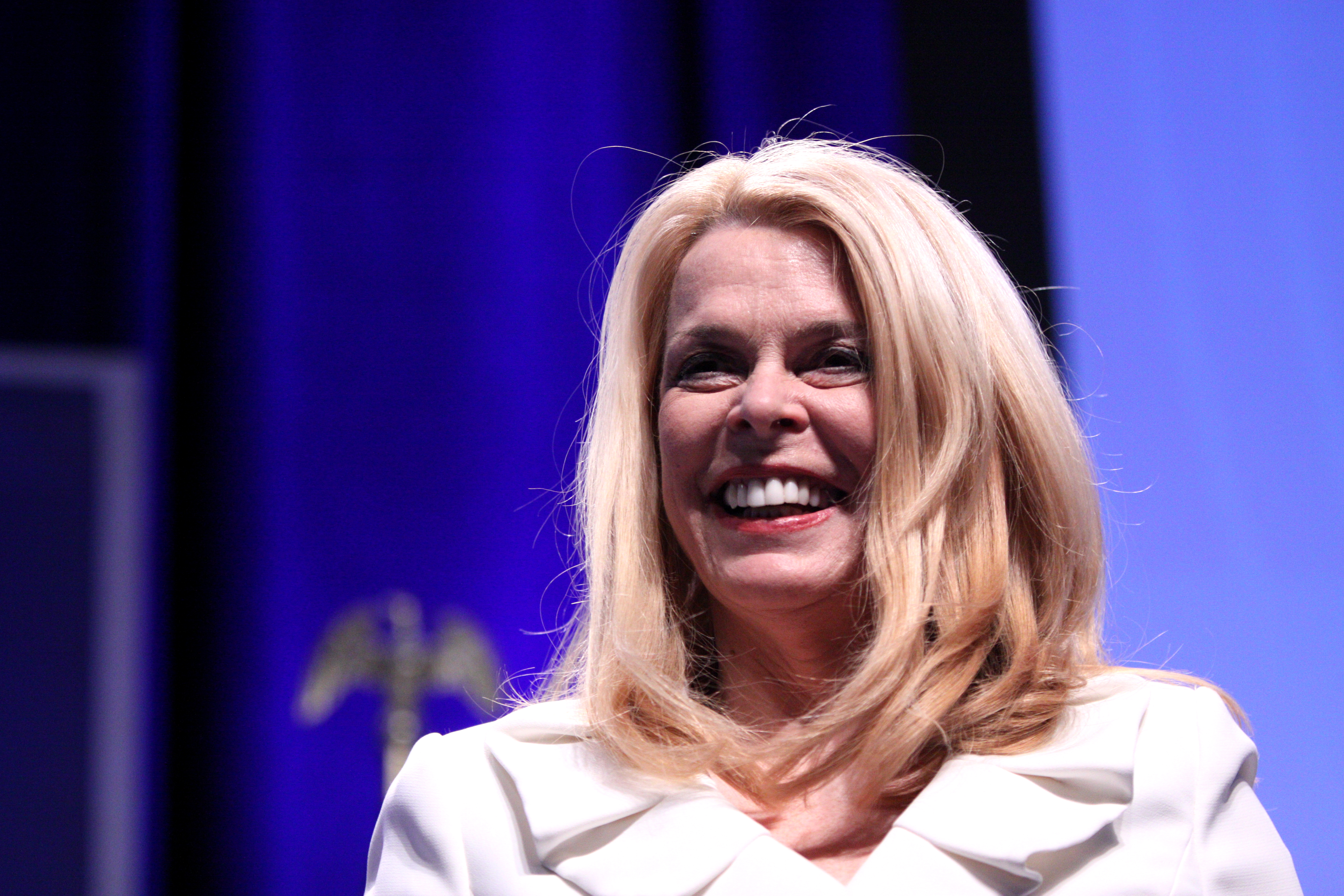
McCaughey in 2011

In an August 7, 2012, opinion piece in The Wall Street Journal, McCaughey described as "phony" an assertion that repealing the Affordable Care Act would increase federal deficits.

In a September 15, 2013, opinion piece in the New York Post entitled "Obamacare will question your sex life", McCaughey wrote:

"Are you sexually active? If so, with one partner, multiple partners or same-sex partners?" Be ready to answer those questions and more the next time you go to the doctor, whether it's the dermatologist or the cardiologist and no matter if the questions are unrelated to why you're seeking medical help. And you can thank the Obama health law.

Politifact rated this assertion as "Pants on Fire", and FactCheck.org also called it false.

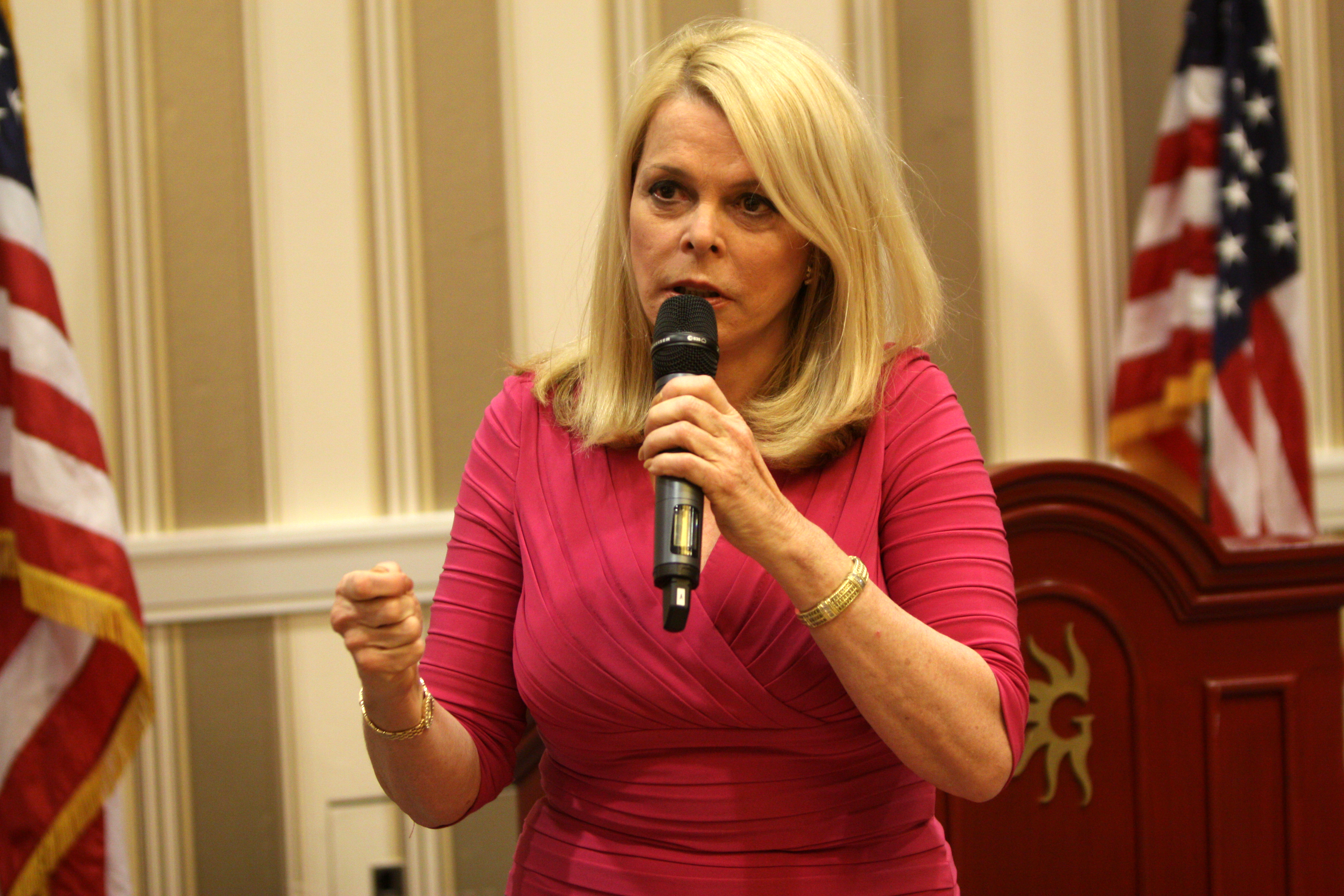
McCaughey in 2013

In an October 25, 2013, appearance on Fox News, McCaughey said that the Affordable Care Act would have the effect of "eviscerating Medicare".

On her Twitter feed and on television, McCaughey stated that members of Congress and other government employees were granted a "special subsidy" and a "premium illegally arranged by Obama" under the Affordable Care Act. Factcheck.org, Politifact, and fact checkers at CNN all found that assertion to be false.

== 2026 Connecticut gubernatorial campaign ==
In 2025, McCaughey, now a resident of Connecticut, sharply criticized Governor Ned Lamont over his decision to sign H.B. 8002, a housing and zoning reform bill, into law. She told the New Haven-based WELI-960 AM "Rich boy Lamont wants a homeless encampment in every town," adding that she is already "gearing up" for a run for governor in 2026. She called state senator Ryan Fazio and former New Britain mayor Erin Stewart, the two current Republican primary candidates, "kids," alluding to their young ages (35 and 38 years old respectively), juxtaposing them with her self-described "decades of experience, public policy knowledge and the strength to stand up to rich boy Lamont." Connecticut Democratic Party chairman Roberto Alves accused McCaughey of "further [illustrating] what we’re seeing more and more of in the Republican field: candidates drifting further away from Connecticut values and deeper into extreme politics and unaffordable economic policies". If elected, McCaughey would become the first Republican to win a statewide election in Connecticut since 2006.

On January 12, 2026, McCaughey announced her campaign for governor of Connecticut in the November 2026 election.

On May 16, 2026, she was eliminated at convention with 8% of the delegate vote.

== Electoral history ==
1994 New York gubernatorial election
| Party | Candidate | Votes | % | ±% |
|---|---|---|---|---|
| Republican | George Pataki Betsy McCaughey Ross | 2,488,631 | 48.8% | ▲27.4% |
| Democratic | Mario Cuomo (incumbent) | 2,364,904 | 45.4% | ▼7.7% |
| Independence Fusion | Tom Golisano | 217,490 | 4.1% | |
| Right to Life | Robert T. Walsh | 67,750 | 1.3% | ▼2.1% |
| Republican gain from Democratic | | Swing | +27.4% | |

1998 New York gubernatorial election
| Party | Candidate | Votes | % | ±% |
|---|---|---|---|---|
| Republican | George Pataki (incumbent) | 2,571,991 | 54.3% | ▲5.5% |
| Democratic | Peter Vallone | 1,570,317 | 33.2% | ▼12.2% |
| Independence | Tom Golisano | 364,056 | 7.7% | ▲3.6% |
| Liberal | Betsy McCaughey Ross | 77,915 | 1.7% | |
| Right to Life | Michael Reynolds | 56,683 | 1.2% | ▼0.1% |
| Green | Al Lewis | 52,533 | 1.1% | |
| Republican hold | | Swing | +5.5% | |

== See also ==
- List of female lieutenant governors in the United States

== Bibliography ==
- Obama Health Law: What It Says and How to Overturn It (Encounter Books, 2010). ISBN 978-1-59403-506-7
- Beating Obamacare: Your Handbook for the New Healthcare Law (Regnery Publishing, 2013). ISBN 978-1621570790

Party political offices
| Preceded by Geff Yancey | Republican nominee for Lieutenant Governor of New York; 1994 | Succeeded by Mary Donohue |
| Preceded by Anthony DiPerna | Conservative nominee for Lieutenant Governor of New York; 1994 | Succeeded by Mary Donohue |
| Preceded by Mario Cuomo | Liberal nominee for Lieutenant Governor of New York; 1998 | Succeeded by Andrew Cuomo |
Political offices
| Preceded by Stan Lundine | Lieutenant Governor of New York; 1995–1998 | Succeeded by Mary Donohue |
