= Mary Donohue =

American politician

Lieutenant Governor of New York
- In office January 1, 1999 – December 31, 2006
- Governor: George Pataki
- Preceded by: Betsy McCaughey
- Succeeded by: David Paterson

Personal details
- Born: March 22, 1947 (age 79) Troy, New York, U.S.
- Party: Republican
- Spouse: Anthony Ricci
- Education: College of New Rochelle; Russell Sage College; Albany Law School (JD)
- Profession: Politician; judge; attorney; teacher

Mary O'Connor Donohue (born March 22, 1947) is an American retired educator, attorney, politician and judge. A Republican, she served as lieutenant governor of New York from 1999 to 2006.

== Education ==
Donohue graduated from the College of New Rochelle and received a master's degree in Education from Russell Sage College. In 1983, she received a Juris Doctor degree from Albany Law School.

== Career ==
Donohue is a former teacher and lawyer who was once an aide to State Senate Majority Leader Joseph Bruno. In addition to working for Bruno, Donohue served as an Assistant County Attorney in Rensselaer County. During her time in the county attorney's office, she worked on Family Court and juvenile justice issues.

Donohue served as the district attorney of Rensselaer County for several years in the 1990s. During her two terms as district attorney, she prosecuted over 5,000 cases a year. Donohue handled several cases herself.

In 1996, she was elected as a justice of the New York State Supreme Court. Serving as a state judge, Donohue handled both civil and criminal cases. She resigned from her judgeship in 1998 when New York Gov. George Pataki asked her to seek election as lieutenant governor of New York.

=== Lieutenant governor of New York ===
Donohue was selected as the running mate to Republican Gov. George Pataki in his 1998 re-election bid. She and Gov. Pataki won their 1998 election and were re-elected in 2002. Donohue served as the lieutenant governor of New York from 1999 to 2006.

When Donohue became lieutenant governor, Gov. Pataki appointed her to head a special task force on school violence issues.

In 2000, Pataki appointed Donohue to chair a task force on quality communities in New York.

=== Later career ===
On March 3, 2006, Donohue informed reporters that her name had been submitted by Pataki to President George W. Bush for nomination to a United States District Court judgeship in Upstate New York.

On December 13, 2006, Pataki nominated Donohue to a seat as a judge of the New York Court of Claims. She was confirmed that day by the State Senate for term expiring in March 2015. Court of Claims Judges preside over lawsuits against the State of New York and various independent state agencies. She took office as a judge after her term as lieutenant governor expired at midnight on December 31, 2006. She retired from the Court of Claims in May 2009.

== Electoral history ==
- 2002 race for governor and lieutenant governor
  - George Pataki and Mary Donohue (R) (inc.), 49%
  - Carl McCall and Dennis Mehiel (D), 34%
  - Tom Golisano and Mary Donohue (I), 14%
- 2002 Independence Party primary for lieutenant governor
  - Mary Donohue (inc.), 64%
  - William J. Neild, 36%
- 1998 race for governor and lieutenant governor
  - George Pataki and Mary Donohue (R) (inc.), 54%
  - Peter Vallone and Sandra Frankel (D), 33%
  - Tom Golisano and Laureen Oliver (I), 8%
  - Betsy McCaughey Ross and Jonathan C. Reiter (L), 1.4%

== See also ==
- List of female lieutenant governors in the United States

Political offices
Preceded by Betsy McCaughey Ross	Lieutenant Governor of New York; 1999–2006	Succeeded by David Paterson
Party political offices
Preceded by Laureen Oliver	Independence Party Nominee for Lieutenant Governor of New York; 2002	Succeeded by David Paterson
Preceded by Betsy McCaughey Ross	Republican Party Nominee for Lieutenant Governor of New York; 1998 and 2002	Succeeded by C. Scott Vanderhoef
