= Independence Party of New York =

Third party in New York, United States

- Chairperson: Frank M. MacKay
- Assembly leader: Fred Thiele
- Founded: 1991; 35 years ago
- Registered: 300,653 ▼
- Legalised: 1991
- Dissolved: 2022 (?)
- Ideology: Populism; Big tent
- Political position: Center to center-right
- National affiliation: Independence Party of America (2007–13) Reform Party (1995-2000) Alliance Party (2020-2021)
- Seats in the U.S. Senate: 0 / 2
- Seats in the U.S. House: 0 / 27
- Elected statewide offices: 0 / 4
- New York State Senate: 0 / 63
- New York State Assembly: 0 / 150
- New York City Council: 0 / 51

Website
- ipny.org

The Independence Party is an affiliate in the U.S. state of New York of the Independence Party of America. The party was founded in 1991 by Dr. Gordon Black, Tom Golisano, and Laureen Oliver from Rochester, New York, and acquired ballot status in 1994. Although often associated with Ross Perot, as the party came to prominence in the wake of Perot's 1992 presidential campaign, it was created prior to Perot's run.

== Platform and candidates ==
The Independence Party's platform is somewhat ambiguous. The party itself is designed to draw independent voters and allows non-affiliated voters to vote in its primary elections, the only significant party in New York State to do so. Current New York State election practice for most parties does not normally permit this. However, there is a provision in the law (Election Law §5-210(5)(f)) which indicates that the party can allow non-members to vote in its primaries. The relevant text of the law says, "in order to vote in a primary election of a political party, a voter must enroll in that political party, unless state party rules allow otherwise."

Like other minor parties in New York, the Independence Party sometimes nominates its own candidates and sometimes endorses one of the major party candidates using electoral fusion. The listing of a major-party candidate on the Independence line can be seen as an indication of that candidate's friendliness to centrist views. Jeffrey Graham, the mayor of Watertown and one of the highest ranking elected officials to be a member of the party, describes the party platform as such: "There is no mystery about the disposition of Line C (...) amassing the greatest number of votes to allow the party to remain on that line(.)" (Line C is the line located immediately under those of the Democratic and Republican Parties; the Independence Party held that line in elections held between 1999 and 2010. Ballot position is determined by the number of votes the line gets in the state gubernatorial election.)

During each gubernatorial election, the votes received by each party determine the order in which the parties will be listed on all state ballots for the next four years. The Independence Party placed fourth in 1994 with its own candidate, Tom Golisano to Row D, and moved up to third in 1998 and 2002, again with Golisano to achieve Row C. In 2006, the Independence Party endorsed Democratic candidate Eliot Spitzer, and retained its place as the top minor party-Row C. Democrat Andrew Cuomo won the party's nomination for governor in 2010. However, Cuomo drew less than 140,000 votes on the Independence line (compared to the 190,000 Spitzer drew in 2006), which resulted in the Independence Party falling to Line E as of 2011 behind the Conservative Party and the Working Families Party. It fell to Line F in the 2014 gubernatorial election, garnering less than 80,000 votes and falling behind the Green Party.

In 2016, in response to a change in New York state law, the Independence Party allied itself with the Independent Democratic Conference (IDC) of the New York State Senate, which allows the IDC to set up a caucus campaign committee. The state senate's Republican conference is a major contributor to the Independence Party's coffers, and numerous Independence Party operatives have official jobs on Republican state senators' payrolls.

== Leadership ==
The chairman of the Independence Party of New York is Frank MacKay, who is also leader of the party in Suffolk County and National Chairman of the newly formed Independence Party of America. Surviving state parties of the Independence Party of America include: the Minnesota Independence Party, Independence Party of Florida, and Independence Party of New York State.

Chairpersons
Name	Tenure	Hometown
Laureen A. Oliver	1991–1996	Rochester
Jack R. Essenberg	1996 – February 2000; April 2000 – May 2000	Miller Place
Frank M. MacKay	February 2000 – April 2000; May 2000 – present	Rocky Point

== Power struggles ==
The party has seen several major internal struggles. In 1996, the founding Chair, Laureen Oliver, declined to run again as State Chair and went on to be the party's State Secretary. She was succeeded by Suffolk County Chair Jack Essenberg. He took the Richmond County chair, Thomas William Hamilton, to court to block his forming a recognized county committee, as this would have allowed the local people the sole voice in who could run locally on the party line. When Essenberg lost this case, Richmond, Jefferson, and Suffolk Counties formed county committees. Suffolk County Chair James FX Doyle was ousted by Frank MacKay, who was elected as Suffolk County Chair and who then became State Chair later in the year. Frank MacKay, before succeeding James Doyle, was Suffolk County Vice Chair.

In 2003, members of the Republican Party successfully hijacked the Cattaraugus County branch of the Independence Party.

Since the summer of 2005, the party has had an internal factional struggle between libertarians in much of New York and Long Island, and followers of Marxist psychotherapist Fred Newman based in New York City.

Jefferson County dissolved its party committee in 2010. The nine committee members split their allegiances between the Anti-Prohibition Party and Taxpayers Party for the 2010 elections; neither achieved automatic ballot access. The Nassau County committee was forcibly dissolved in February 2011 after MacKay seized control over the party's operations from Bobby Kalotee.

== History ==
=== Founding ===
The Independence Party was founded in 1991 by a Rochester, New York-based, group, later merging for a time with the Bronx-based Independent Fusion Party to form the Independence Fusion Party. The Bronx-based Independent Fusion Party had earlier been active in endorsing Rudy Giuliani in the 1989 mayoral election (and again in 1993), seeking to emulate the City Fusion Party of the Fiorello H. La Guardia era and taking the historic four-leaf clover as its symbol. The unexpectedly strong showing of Ross Perot in the 1992 U.S. presidential election raised the profile of political independents in the country and led to centrist political parties rising to prominence in many states. It first achieved ballot status in New York as the "Independence Fusion Party" in 1994, and after that election reverted to just the Independence Party again. The Independence Party affiliated with the Reform Party of the United States, which was directly founded by Perot in 1995, and broke off from that party in 2000.

=== Governor of New York ===
In the elections for Governor of New York in 1994, 1998, and 2002, the Independence Party's candidate was businessman Tom Golisano, whose personal wealth enabled him to mount well-funded campaigns. In 1994 election he finished 4th, and 3rd in the 1998 and 2002 elections, far ahead of all other candidates not running on the Democratic or Republican ballot lines. Because Golisano received more than 50,000 votes each time, the party was guaranteed an automatic ballot line for the following four years. It has enjoyed the 4th ballot line after the 1994 election, the third line on the ballot continuously since the end of the 1998 gubernatorial election cycle. Following the 2010 election, the party was in 5th place. Following the 2014 election it finished in 6th place and was Row F for the following four years. The party endorsed Andrew Cuomo in the 2018 election, receiving 68,713 votes on the Independence Party line.

=== President ===
In the 2000 elections, Newman initially backed Reform Presidential candidate Pat Buchanan, but then he switched to Natural Law Party candidate John Hagelin. This resulted from squabbles between Newman's faction and the Buchanan campaign. The Independence Party chose Hagelin as the nominee over Ralph Nader.

=== U.S. Senate ===
While the Independence Party considered New York City Mayor Rudy Giuliani for its U.S. Senate nomination, when he declined to run, the party ended up endorsing party member and Watertown Mayor Jeff Graham against Democrat Hillary Clinton and Republican Rick Lazio.

=== Mayor of New York City ===
In 2001 the Independence Party endorsed Michael Bloomberg, the billionaire Republican candidate for mayor of New York City. He offered each of the five county organizations within the city $5000, which all but Staten Island (Richmond County), still led by Hamilton, accepted. Bloomberg also created his own independent ballot line, which he named the Students First Party, which was merged with the Independence Party's line on the ballot. The votes he received on the combined Independence Party/Students First Party ballot line, which counted toward his total under New York's fusion rule, exceeded his margin of victory over Democrat Mark J. Green, who also appeared on the Working Families Party line.

The following year, the New York City Industrial Development Agency (with agreement by the state) approved an $8.7 million bond to help finance a new headquarters for a youth charity controlled by Newman and Lenora Fulani, Newman's chief spokesperson and a prominent Independence Party public figure. The media characterized approval of the bond as a reward from the mayor as well as incentive by Governor George Pataki (see below) to obtain Newman and Fulani's support for his re-election campaign.

In 2017, the Independence Party endorsed Paul Massey for mayor of New York City.

=== Golisano ===
In 2002, Tom Golisano sought the Independence Party's gubernatorial nomination, for the third time. Incumbent governor Pataki initially won the endorsement of the Newman-influenced Independence Party state convention, with the full support of party Chair Frank MacKay. In May (only four days after final approval of the IDA bond), Golisano, supported by IP founder Laureen Oliver and many of the original founding members, launched a primary challenge. Golisano supporters in the Conservative Party also launched a write-in primary in that party. In September, Golisano lost the Conservative write-in primary, but won narrowly to achieve ballot listing on the Independence line.

During the primary campaign, Golisano charged that Pataki's supporters had filed thousands of fraudulent Independence Party registrations in an attempt to marginalize upstate New York's already limited power in state government and to undermine Golisano's threat to the Republican power base. In the primary battle and in the general election, MacKay and followers of Newman within the IP, including Fulani, supported Pataki. In the November 2002 general election, Golisano retained row C for the Independence party by polling 14% of the popular vote. (Golisano later changed his own party registration to Republican, but finally decided not to seek nomination to succeed then-retiring Governor Pataki.)

=== Nader ===
In 2004 the Independence Party endorsed Ralph Nader in his independent bid for president. Nader also petitioned for an independent line, which he named the Peace and Justice Party. Nader received 84,247 votes on the Independence Party line as opposed to 15,626 on Peace and Justice.

=== Bloomberg ===
With the approach of the 2005 elections for municipal offices, Bloomberg gave the Newman-controlled Manhattan branch of the Independence Party $250,000 to fund a phone bank seeking to recruit volunteers for Bloomberg's re-election campaign. On May 28, 2005, the Independence Party endorsed Michael Bloomberg for re-election. Bloomberg won by a wide margin. During the campaign a consulting outfit controlled by the Newman wing of the party received an additional $180,000 as a Bloomberg campaign subcontractor, according to the New York City Campaign Finance Board.

In September 2005 the brewing struggle resulted in the party's state executive committee's ousting Fulani and other Newman followers. The catalyst was a media controversy over Fulani's refusal to publicly disavow her now-infamous 1989 statement that Jews are "mass murderers of people of color". Seventy-five percent of all state committee members supported this move.

But Fulani—whose supporters called the purge racist, sexist, McCarthyistic and even antisemitic—continues to be active in the party's Newman-controlled New York City machine. The New York County chairperson Cathy Stewart and party strategist Jacqueline Salit run it on Newman's behalf. The New York City organization remains the most influential of the party's factions because of its small army of hard-working volunteers and the financial support it receives from prominent politicians and Newman's own political and psychotherapy base.

On February 4, 2006, the Executive Committee of the Independence Party of the State of New York dissolved the Interim County Organizations of Brooklyn, Queens and the Bronx, which had been controlled by Newman and Fulani. The Committee's resolution stated the action was a result of the antisemitism and racism espoused by Fulani and Newman, which are antithetical to the principles of the Independence Party. One week later they attempted to suspend the chair of the Staten Island IP, a member of the Fulani group. The resulting court action allowed the chair to stay in office, but also gave the opposing faction the right to make party endorsements for several local offices in the 2006 election. Although the "Newmanites" still control the Manhattan county organization, the recent revolt has probably ended their ability to influence the selection of the party's nominees anywhere in New York State except the borough of Manhattan.

On June 4, 2006, the State Chairman Frank MacKay started dis-enrollment hearings against Fred Newman, Lenora Fulani, and almost 140 of their followers, in order to seize control of the New York City county organizations. Three different judges, in three different counties, repudiated MacKay's efforts to dis-enroll Fulani, Newman and the other 140 New York City activists. In July 2006, more than 4,000 New York City Independence Party members created duly constituted County Committees in Staten Island, Brooklyn, Queens and Manhattan, so that the State Chair could not take away local control in New York City.

=== Spitzer ===
In November 2006, Eliot Spitzer, running for Governor, received over 190,661 votes on the Independence Party line, more than enough to secure the party's spot on Row "C" for the next four years. Also, 19% of those votes were produced by the New York City organization. Additionally, in 2006, the Independence Party had its first member elected to the New York Legislature with the election of Timothy P. Gordon in the State Assembly, who also ran with the Democratic endorsement.

In September 2007, activists from the party meeting in White Plains, New York founded the Independence Party of America as a national party. The national party dissolved some time before 2013.

=== McCain ===
In the 2008 presidential election, the Independence Party endorsed John McCain for President and Sarah Palin for Vice President. They received 163,973 votes on the Independence Party line, compared to 170,475 on the Conservative Party line and 2,418,323 on the Republican Party line.

On April 5, 2009, the Independence Party endorsed Michael Bloomberg for Mayor of New York City.

In September 2009, Assemblyman Fred Thiele switched parties from the Republican Party to the Independence Party.

=== Investigation ===
On February 18, 2011, the Independence Party's assets were frozen as a result of an investigation into the theft of $1.2 million from the campaign of Michael Bloomberg, which ended up in the Independence Party's accounts. Fred Newman died on July 3 of that year.

=== Johnson ===
The Independence Party endorsed Gary Johnson in the 2016 presidential election, cross-endorsing with the Libertarian Party of New York. Notably, the Independence Party endorsed Johnson over Republican Party nominee Donald Trump, who (during his 2000 campaign for the Reform Party nomination) had previously been a member of the Independence Party.

=== Pierce ===
The Independence Party endorsed entrepreneur and independent candidate Brock Pierce in the 2020 presidential election.

=== Mayor of Syracuse ===
Ben Walsh, despite coming from a family of prominent Republicans refused to affiliate with the Republican Party when he turned eighteen and, when he chose to run for Mayor of Syracuse in 2017, did so on two minor party lines, the Independence Party of New York and Reform Party of New York State; in what was generally seen as an upset, Ben Walsh defeated Democratic Party front runner Juanita Perez Williams.

== Voter registration ==
New York:

Year	RV
1996	70,114
1997	92,625
1998	122,172
1999	147,545
2000	172,471
2001	202,550
2002	217,930
2003	263,803
2004	280,532
2005	328,752
2006	339,382
2007	336,847
2008	355,934
2009	400,178
2010	413,855
2011	425,891
2012	447,170
2013	475,123
2014	482,356
2015	475,276
2016	475,566
2017	479,212
2018	481,831
2019	485,037
2020	483,870
2022	322,070
2024	300,653
2026	163,021

== See also ==
- Independence Party of America
- United States Independence Party (also known as the Independence League; active in New York politics in the early 20th century)
