= Peter Vallone Sr. =

American politician (born 1934)

Speaker of the New York City Council
- In office January 1, 1990 – December 31, 2001
- Preceded by: Position established
- Succeeded by: Gifford Miller

Majority Leader of the New York City Council
- In office January 1, 1986 – December 31, 2001
- Preceded by: Thomas J. Cuite
- Succeeded by: Joel Rivera

Member of the New York City Council
- In office January 1, 1974 – December 31, 2001
- Preceded by: Thomas J. Cuite
- Succeeded by: Peter Vallone Jr.
- Constituency: 20th district (1974–1991); 22nd district (1992–2001)

Personal details
- Born: Peter Fortunate Vallone; December 13, 1934 (age 91) New York City, U.S.
- Party: Democratic
- Education: Fordham University (BS, LLB)

Peter Fortunate Vallone Sr. (born December 13, 1934) is an American politician and attorney from the state of New York. A Democrat, Vallone served on the New York City Council from 1974 to 2001 and served as speaker of the Council from 1990 to 2001. Vallone was the Democratic candidate for governor of New York in 1998, losing the election to Republican incumbent Governor George Pataki.

== Background and education ==
Peter Vallone Sr. was the first Speaker of the New York City Council to be born in the borough of Queens in New York City. Vallone's father, Judge Charles J. Vallone (1901–1967) of the Queens County Civil Court, encouraged young Peter to broaden his horizons beyond the limited social interactions with other ethnic and religious groups that were discouraged in the pre-Vatican II era. His mother, Leah Palmigiano Vallone, was a teacher and a Democratic State Committeewoman.

Vallone attended Fordham University, where he received his bachelor's degree in 1956 and his law degree in 1959.

== Political career ==
A Democrat, Vallone represented Astoria, Queens on the New York City Council from 1974 to 2001. He became the first Speaker of the City Council in 1990, serving in that capacity until 2001.

Vallone drafted changes to the City Charter in 1989 that he claimed allowed the Council more influence on the budget.

Vallone was an unsuccessful candidate for governor in 1998. As the Democratic nominee, he received 1,570,317 votes (33.16%), losing to Republican incumbent George Pataki. Vallone was also notably the first ever candidate endorsed by the Working Families Party, with the party receiving 51,325 votes for Vallone via fusion voting.

Vallone also ran for Mayor of New York City in 2001, placing third in the Democratic primary.

== Later career ==
Vallone has taught political science at Baruch College. His autobiography, Learning to Govern: My Life in New York Politics, From Hell Gate to City Hall, described his years in government. He practices law in Astoria with his son, Peter Vallone Jr., who succeeded him in the City Council in 2002. After he retired from politics, Vallone founded a lobbying firm with a partner, Constantinople and Vallone

In 2005, Vallone endorsed Republican Michael Bloomberg for Mayor of New York City. In 2009, he endorsed a former rival in the mayoral race, Mark Green, who attempted to win back the job of Public Advocate.

== Personal life ==
Vallone married his wife, Tena, in 1958. The Vallones have three children (politician and judge Peter Jr., attorney and politician Paul, and Perry) and several grandchildren.

== Electoral history ==
New York gubernatorial election, 1998
Party	Candidate	Votes	%	±%
Republican	George Pataki	2,223,264	44.59%	
Conservative	George Pataki	348,727	6.99%	
Total	George Pataki (incumbent)	2,571,991	54.32%	+5.53%
Democratic	Peter Vallone, Sr.	1,518,992	30.47%	
Working Families	Peter Vallone, Sr.	51,325	1.03%	
Total	Peter Vallone, Sr.	1,570,317	33.16%	−12.29%
Independence	Tom Golisano	364,056	7.69%	+3.51%
Liberal	Betsy McCaughey	77,915	1.65%	−0.12%
Right to Life	Michael Reynolds	56,683	1.20%	−0.10%
Green	Al Lewis	52,533	1.11%	N/A
Marijuana Reform	Thomas K. Leighton	24,788	0.52%	N/A
Unity	Mary Alice France	9,692	0.21%	N/A
Libertarian	Chris Garvey	4,722	0.11%	−0.07%
Socialist Workers	Al Duncan	2,539	0.05%	+0.01%
	Blank – Void – Scattering	250,696	5.02%	N/A
Majority		1,001,674	21.15%	+17.81%
Turnout		4,985,932		
Republican hold		Swing		

New York City Council
Preceded by Thomas J. Cuite	Member of the New York City Council from the 20th district 1974–1991	Succeeded by Julia Harrison
Preceded by Arthur Katzman	Member of the New York City Council from the 22nd district 1992–2001	Succeeded by Peter Vallone Jr.
Preceded by Thomas J. Cuite	Majority Leader of the New York City Council; 1986–2001	Succeeded by Joel Rivera
New office	Speaker of the New York City Council; 1990–2001	Succeeded by Gifford Miller
Party political offices
Preceded by Mario Cuomo	Democratic nominee for Governor of New York; 1998	Succeeded by Carl McCall
