= Tom Golisano =

American businessman (born 1941)

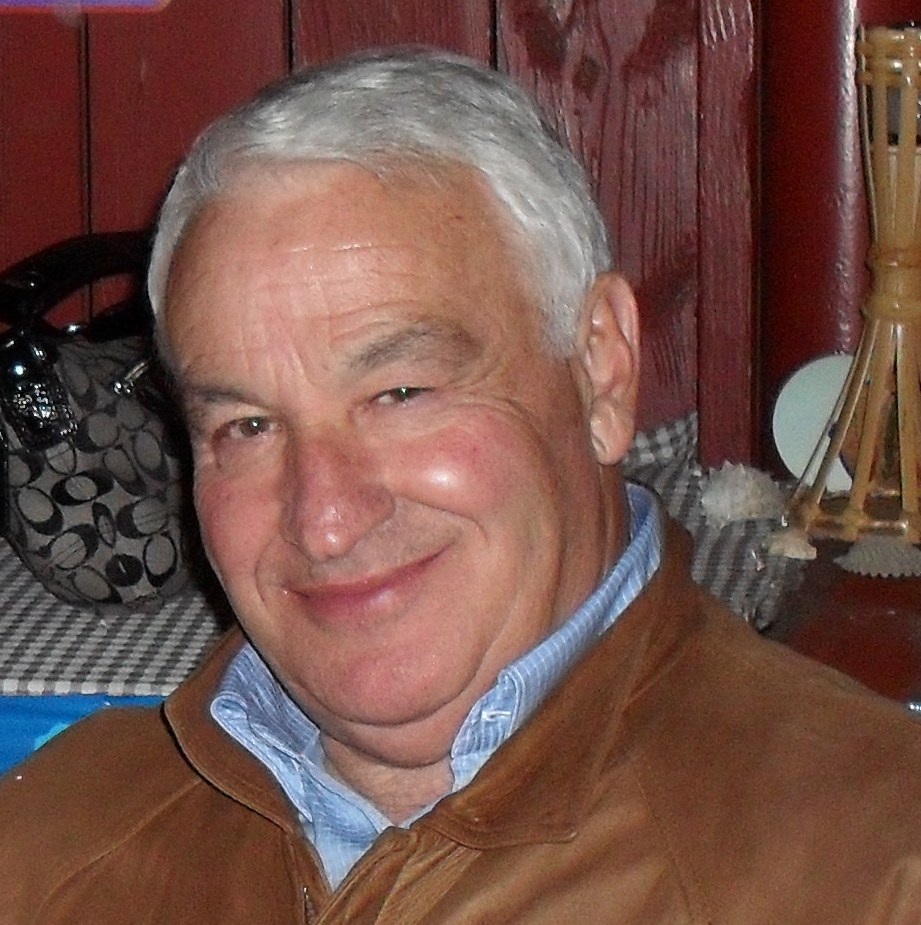
- Born: Blase Thomas Golisano; November 14, 1941 (age 85); Rochester, New York, U.S
- Education: Alfred State College (AAS)
- Political party: Independence (1991–2005); Republican (2005–present)
- Spouse: Monica Seles
- Children: 2
- Website: Golisano Foundation

Blase Thomas Golisano (born November 14, 1941) is an American billionaire businessman and philanthropist.

He is the founder of Paychex, which offers payroll and human resources services to businesses. Golisano owned Greenlight Networks, a fiber internet provider based in Rochester, New York, from 2019 to 2022. He owned the Buffalo Sabres of the National Hockey League and Buffalo Bandits of the National Lacrosse League from 2003 to 2011. Golisano unsuccessfully ran for Governor of New York as a third-party candidate in 1994, 1998, and 2002. As of 2020, Golisano had a net worth of US$5.2 billion.

== Business ==
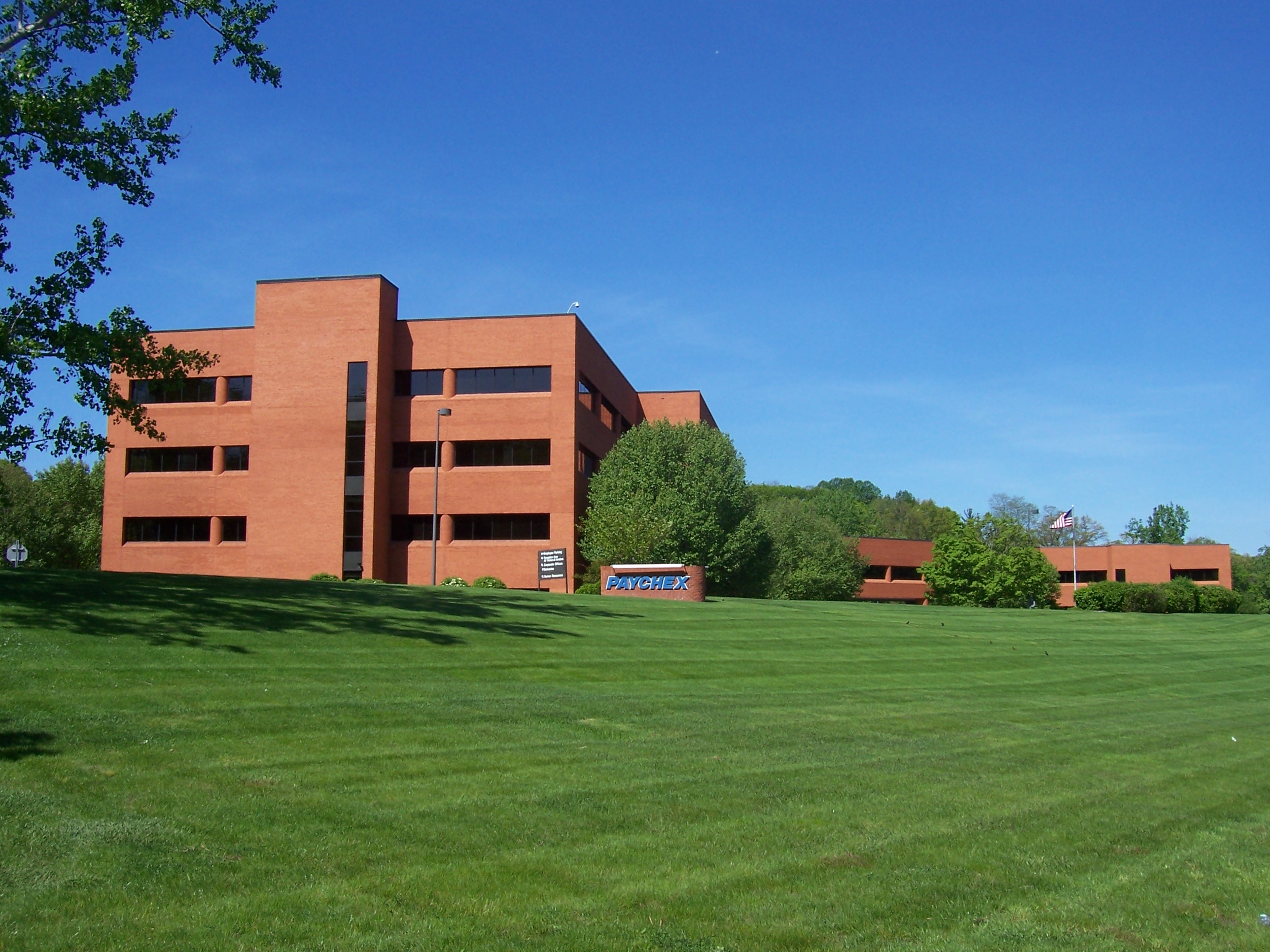
Paychex Headquarters in Rochester, New York

Paychex was founded by Golisano in 1971. He started the company with $3,000 and a credit card. Golisano served as its president and chief executive officer from 1971 to October 2004. He has been the chairman of Paychex since October 1, 2004, and its director since 1979.

In April 2018, it was announced that Golisano was purchasing Greenlight Networks, a Rochester-based fiber internet provider and local competitor to Frontier Communications and Charter Spectrum that was established in 2012. Following Golisano's purchase of Greenlight, the company began expanding into new areas due to a $100 million investment by Golisano. However in 2022, Golisano sold his controlling equity shares of Greenlight Networks to the investment firm Oak Hill.

The 2020 Forbes 400 list stated that Golisano was the 238th wealthiest person in America with a net worth of $3.4 billion as of September 2020. The 2022 list of The World's Billionaires by Forbes ranked Golisano as the 490th wealthy billionaire with a net worth of $5.4 billion. In 2023, he was ranked as the 552nd wealthiest billionaire in the world with a net worth of $4.9 billion.

== Professional sports ==
Golisano is a former co-owner (along with real estate developer Larry Quinn) of the Buffalo Sabres hockey team and of the Buffalo Bandits lacrosse team. He purchased the Sabres from the NHL who had stripped the team from their previous owner John Rigas, the former Adelphia CEO who was charged and convicted of bank fraud, wire fraud, and securities fraud and had owned the team since 1997. He sold the Sabres and its assets to billionaire Terrence Pegula in February 2011. Golisano made a bid for the bankrupt Los Angeles Dodgers franchise in early 2012, but his group was eventually outbid by a consortium led by Magic Johnson and the Guggenheim Partners. In order to help keep the team in Western New York, he also made a bid for the Buffalo Bills when that franchise came up for sale in 2014; that team was also ultimately purchased by Pegula.

== Political involvement ==
Golisano is a founding member of the Independence Party of New York and ran on its ticket for governor of New York in 1994, 1998 and 2002. Although he was never elected, his percentage of the vote increased with each election. He spent a combined $93 million on the three campaigns. By receiving more than 50,000 votes each time, Golisano brought the Independence Party an automatic ballot line for the succeeding four years. After New York's Republican governor, George Pataki announced he would not run again in the 2006 election, Republican officials attempted to recruit Golisano to run for the Republican nomination. He changed his party affiliation to Republican, with the Independence Party's chairman's blessing, in October 2005, apparently in preparation for another gubernatorial run. In February 2006, Golisano announced that he would not run for the governorship.

In August 2008, Golisano contributed $1 million to the Democratic National Convention.

In July 2008, Golisano formed a PAC called Responsible New York and funded it with $5 million of his own money. The PAC gives money to candidates for the New York state legislature, regardless of party, and supports candidates for property tax cuts and election reform.

In October 2008, Golisano voiced his opinion in favor of term limits for public offices in New York City. Golisano vowed to fight Mayor Michael Bloomberg's proposal to extend term limits, arguing that the people of New York City have voted twice in favor of the current law. There was speculation that he would run for governor again on the Republican ticket, but it was announced, on May 15, 2009, that he was moving to Florida to escape New York's high taxes.

In June 2009, Golisano took partial credit for creating the 2009 New York State Senate leadership crisis in which Republicans temporarily seized control of a body that still retained a Democratic enrollment edge. Golisano, who had supported a number of Democratic Party candidates during the 2008 election, was dissatisfied with things like the Democrats' effort to solve the state's budget crisis by raising taxes on New York's wealthiest residents. He orchestrated the defection of Democratic senators Pedro Espada Jr. and Hiram Monserrate, who voted with Republicans to reinstate Dean Skelos as majority leader. The attempted coup failed when Espada and Monserrate returned to the Senate Democratic Conference.

In February 2011, Golisano became the spokesman for National Popular Vote Inc., a non-profit organization seeking to implement a popular vote system for presidential elections by harnessing the electoral college.

In January 2018, Golisano announced the formation of a campaign called Tax My Property Fairly. The stated purpose of the campaign is "to help Upstate New York homeowners fight for fair property taxes."

== Philanthropy ==
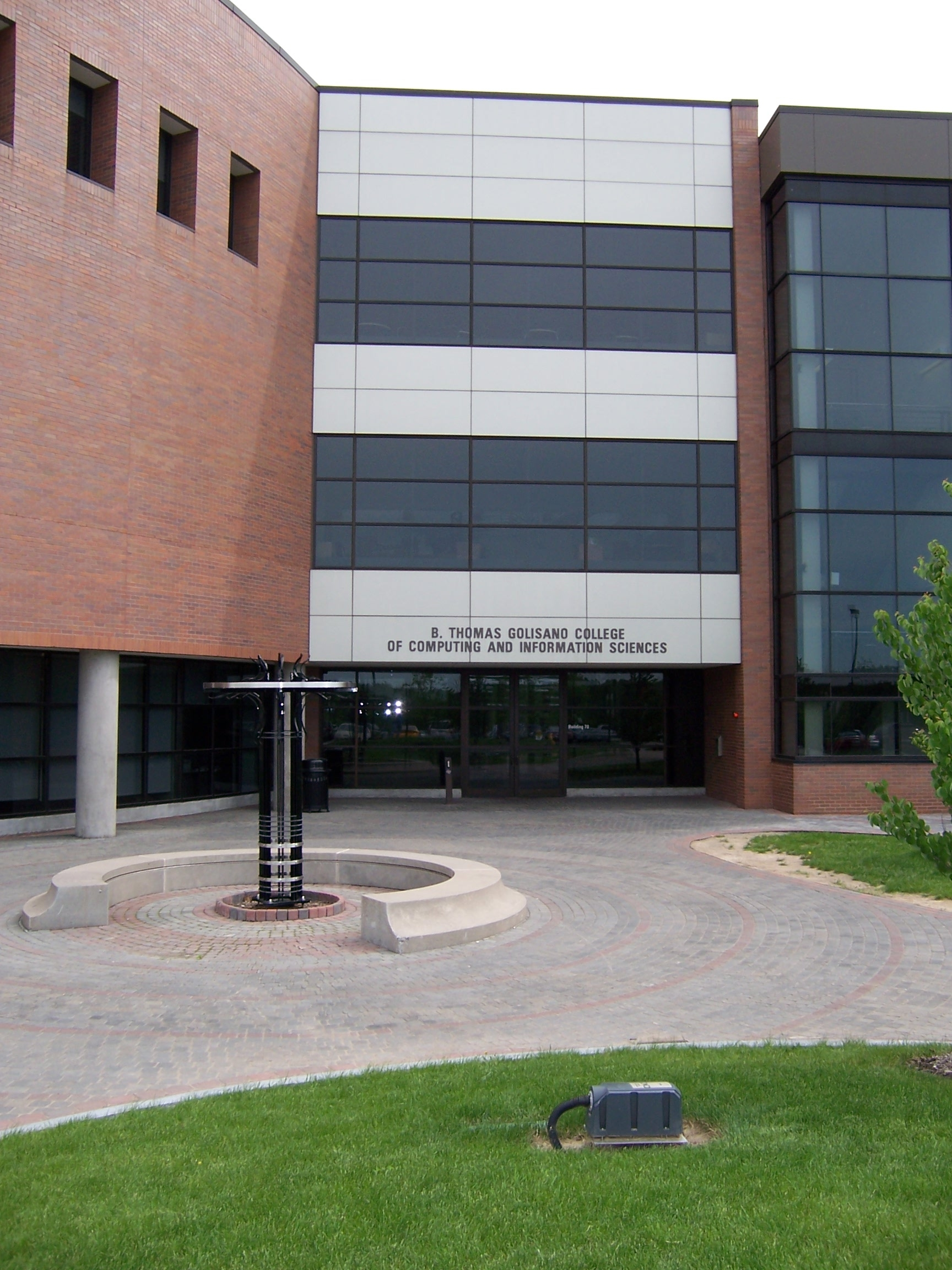
B. Thomas Golisano College of Computing and Information Sciences at the Rochester Institute of Technology

As of Jan. 2021, Golisano has pledged or donated more than $300 million to a variety of philanthropic causes.

Golisano founded the B. Thomas Golisano Foundation in 1985 with an initial gift of $90,000. The Foundation awards grants to organizations dedicated to providing opportunities for those with intellectual and developmental disabilities and their families.

In October 2008, Golisano donated $10 million to Niagara University for a new B. Thomas Golisano Center for Integrated Sciences building.

In September 2009, Golisano donated $6 million to build a children's hospital in Syracuse, New York, causing it to be the second children's hospital in New York State to be named after Golisano after Golisano Children's Hospital (Rochester). It is called Upstate Golisano Children's Hospital, a part of Upstate University Hospital.

In November 2009, Golisano donated $4 million to Ave Maria University for the construction of a new field house.

In 2012, Golisano donated $12 million to the Special Olympics to launch the Healthy Communities initiative. The purpose of the initiative is to increase year-round access to health care for people with intellectual disabilities. He made an additional commitment of $25 million to Special Olympics in 2015 to expand Healthy Communities to 100 locations around the world. This was the largest single gift to an organization made by Golisano and the largest single gifts ever received from an individual by Special Olympics. Also in 2012, Golisano donated $20 million to build a new Golisano Children's Hospital at Lee Health in southwest Florida which opened in Spring 2017.

In 2014, the Golisano Neurology and Rehabilitation Center opened at Unity Hospital in Rochester, funded in part by a $10 million contribution from Golisano.

Golisano and the Golisano Foundation were recognized among 30 givers and causes on Forbes' "Philanthropy's Big Bets for Social Change of 2015."

In June 2016, the Golisano Center for Community Health opened its doors to patients. The center, which provides integrated health care to people with disabilities and their families, was made possible with a gift of $3.5 million from Golisano. In September 2016, Golisano gave $7.5 million to Nazareth University for a new athletic training center that will aim to be a model of inclusion, fitness and wellness, and is expected to open in 2018. Also in September 2016, Golisano gave $2 million to the WXXI Public Broadcasting Council for equipment. This was his second gift to WXXI; he gave $2 million in 2004 to allow WXXI to upgrade to digital broadcasting equipment.

In April 2017, the City of Rochester announced modified Rochester Broadway Theatre League proposal for Midtown Plaza which in partnership with Morgan Development would include a performing arts center to be called the Golisano Center for the Performing Arts in honor of a donation made to the project by Golisano. Also in 2017, at the Special Olympics World Games, the first Golisano Global Health Care Leadership Awards were presented to recognize those who are advancing inclusive health for people with intellectual disabilities.

Golisano donated $14 million to the University of Rochester, which renamed their pediatric facility at Strong Memorial Hospital the Golisano Children's Hospital in 2002. In 2012, Golisano pledged an additional $20 million to URMC to build a new Golisano Children's Hospital, which opened in 2015.

In April 2017, Golisano and the Golisano Foundation pledged $3 million to construct a facility dedicated to providing services to families of autistic children and adults in the city of Rochester. The Golisano Autism Center, which opened in September 2019 in a new 33,000 sq. ft. building, is unique in how it integrated numerous recreational, medical and educational support providers and services into one location.

In 2024, Golisano donated $360 million to 82 different non-profits across Upstate New York.

In August 2025, Golisano donated $50 million to Oishei Children's Hospital in Buffalo, New York warranting it to be renamed to Golisano Children's Hospital of Buffalo making it the 3rd hospital to be named after Golisano after Golisano Children's Hospital (Rochester) and Upstate Golisano Children's Hospital in Syracuse.

In October 2025, Golisano donated $50 million to UK HealthCare and the University of Kentucky for naming rights to the Kentucky Children's Hospital, now named Golisano Children's Hospital at UK.

In April 2026, Golisano donated $50 million to Akron Children's Hospital in Akron, Ohio, $40 million to Dayton Children's Hospital in Dayton, Ohio, and $35 million to Avera Health in Sioux Falls, South Dakota, expanding the "Golisano Children’s Alliance hospitals" to 15 locations across the United States. Akron Children's Hospital's Akron campus will be renamed "Akron Children’s, Golisano Campus”; Dayton Children’s Hospital's main campus will be renamed the “Golisano Comprehensive Care Campus”; and Avera Health will name its new children’s hospital, located within the patient care tower at Avera McKennan Hospital & University Health Center, the “Avera Golisano Children’s Hospital."

In September 2026, it was announced that that Golisano donated $30 million to the Children's Hospital at Dartmouth Hitchcock Medical Center (CHaD). The hospital was renamed the Golisano Children's Hospital at Dartmouth Health.

== Golisano Institute for Business and Entrepreneurship ==
Golisano founded the Golisano Institute for Business and Entrepreneurship in Brighton, NY. The institute enrolled its first class in Rochester, NY in 2023, and graduated its inaugural cohort in 2025. The school opened with a single two-year certificate in business and entrepreneurship, utilizing a flipped classroom-style instruction, and provides students with the opportunity to meet local business owners and make networking connections. Golisano has said the school is oriented to "reducing the time and cost of business-related education." The business institute is housed in a former Paychex building that Golisano bought for $10 million in October 2022. A WXXI News report stated the school is a "nonprofit venture" and reported that Golisano is "bankrolling the institution, but he is not running it." Tuition is $8,900 per year, and the Thomas Golisano Foundation is covering the school's operating costs.

Golisano hired Ian Mortimer, who was previously the associate provost at the Rochester Institute of Technology, as the school's first president.

In 2025, the institute began offering a one-year certificate in artificial intelligence, consisting of courses ranging from data decision making using AI to a coding bootcamp. The institute will open a second campus in Buffalo, NY in the former Buffalo News building in fall 2026. The Buffalo site will serve as a hub for both students and nearby businesses, and host a weekly speaker series.

== Built Not Born ==
In February 2020, Golisano released Built, Not Born: A Self-Made Billionaire's No-Nonsense Guide for Entrepreneurs, co-authored by Mike Wicks. The book, published by HarperCollins, contains business advice drawn from Golisano's fifty years of experience. The book reached #1 on Barnes & Noble's bestselling business book charts.

== Personal life ==
Three times divorced, Golisano is married to former tennis player Monica Seles.

== Electoral history ==
- 2002 race for Governor
  - George Pataki (R) (inc.), 49%
  - Carl McCall (D), 34%
  - Tom Golisano (I), 14%
- 1998 race for Governor
  - George Pataki (R) (inc.), 54%
  - Peter Vallone (D), 33%
  - Tom Golisano (I), 8%
- 1994 race for Governor
  - George Pataki (R), 49%
  - Mario Cuomo (D) (inc.), 45%
  - Tom Golisano (I), 4%

== See also ==
- List of richest American politicians

Party political offices
First	Independence nominee for Governor of New York; 1994, 1998, 2002	Succeeded by Eliot Spitzer
Sporting positions
Preceded by John Rigas	Buffalo Sabres owner 2003–2011; Served alongside: Larry Quinn	Succeeded by Terry Pegula
