= 1994 New York Attorney General election =

1994 New York Attorney General Election
- November 8, 1994
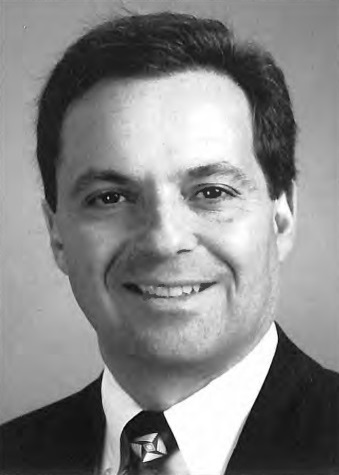

Nominee	Dennis Vacco	Karen Burstein
Party	Republican	Democratic
Alliance	Parties: Conservative; Tax Cut Now	Liberal
Popular vote	2,294,528	2,206,188
Percentage	49.28%	47.38%
- County results Vacco: 40–50% 50–60% 60–70% Burstein: 50–60% 60–70% 70–80%
New York Attorney General before election
G. Oliver Koppell
Democratic
Elected New York Attorney General
Dennis Vacco
Republican

The 1994 New York Attorney General election took place on November 8, 1994. Republican nominee Dennis Vacco narrowly defeated Democratic nominee Karen Burstein. As of 2026, this is the last time a Republican was elected Attorney General of New York.

== Background ==
Attorney General Robert Abrams ran for United States Senate in 1992 but narrowly lost to incumbent Republican Al D'Amato. Abrams announced his resignation from the office of attorney general on September 8, 1993, to take effect on December 31.

The New York State Legislature appointed G. Oliver Koppel, an Assemblyman from the Bronx, to fill the office of Attorney General until a successor was elected at the regularly scheduled 1994 election.

== Democratic primary ==
=== Candidates ===
- Karen Burstein, New York Family Court judge and former State Senator from Mineola
- Charles J. Hynes, former Kings County District Attorney
- G. Oliver Koppel, incumbent Attorney General and former State Assemblyman from the Bronx
- Eliot Spitzer, former Manhattan prosecutor

== General election ==
=== Candidates ===
- Karen Burstein, New York Family Court judge and former State Senator from Mineola (Democratic and Liberal)
- Daniel Conti (Libertarian)
- James Hartman (Independence)
- Nancy Rosenstock (Socialist Workers)
- Alfred Skidmore (Right to Life)
- Dennis Vacco, former U.S. Attorney for the Western District of New York (Republican and Conservative)

=== Campaign ===
In the final month of the campaign, Staten Island Borough President Guy Molinari publicly remarked that Burstein would be unqualified for office because she was a lesbian.

=== Results ===
General Election Results
Party	Candidate	Votes	%
Republican	Dennis Vacco	1,988,567	42.71%
Conservative	Dennis Vacco	305,961	6.57%
Total	Dennis Vacco	2,294,528	49.28%
Democratic	Karen Burstein	2,097,083	45.04%
Liberal	Karen Burstein	109,105	2.34%
Total	Karen Burstein	2,206,188	47.38%
Right to Life	Alfred Skidmore	85,649	1.84%
Independence	James Hartman	37,500	0.81%
Libertarian	Daniel Conti	19,202	0.41%
Socialist Workers	Nancy Rosenstock	13,416	0.29%
Majority		88,340	1.9%
Turnout		4,656,483	
Republican gain from Democratic			

== See also ==
Preceded by 1990	New York Attorney General election 1994	Succeeded by 1998
