= Dreamscape =

Dreamscape may refer to:

- A compound word made up of the stems dream and landscape meaning a dream world

== Music ==
- Dreamscape (band), a German progressive metal band
- Dreamscape (album), a 2024 album by NCT Dream
- Dreamscape, a 1995 album by Jamaaladeen Tacuma
- Dreamscape, a 2009 album by Gil Mantera's Party Dream
- Dreamscape, a song on Epica's 2014 album The Quantum Enigma
- Dreamscape, a song on In Flames' 1994 album Lunar Strain
- Dreamscape, a song on Alan Parsons' 1993 album Try Anything Once
- Dreamscape, a song on Alexander Perls' 2006 album 009 Sound System
- Dreamscape, a song on Sabbat's 1991 album Mourning Has Broken
- Dreamscape, a song on Toyah Willcox's 1983 album Love Is the Law
- Dreamscape (rave), a series of rave music events held in the United Kingdom during the 1990s particularly at the Sanctuary Music Arena in Milton Keynes
- Dreamscapes, a 1999 box set by Alphaville
- Dreamscapes, a song on the 3rd and the Mortal's 1996 album Painting on Glass
- Dream()scape, a 2024 EP by NCT Dream

== Film and television ==
- Dreamscape (1984 film), a 1984 science fiction film
- Dreamscape (2007 film)
- "Dreamscape" (Xiaolin Showdown), a 2004 episode of Xiaolin Showdown
- "Dreamscape" (American Dragon: Jake Long), a 2006 episode of American Dragon: Jake Long
- "The Dreamscape", a 2008 first-season episode of Fringe

== Other uses ==
- Dreamscape, a 2007 play by Rickerby Hinds about the police shooting of Tyisha Miller in Riverside CA
- Dreamscape Online, an ISP based in upstate New York
- Dreamscape, a 2011 video game developed by Speedbump Studies for iOS devices
- Dreamscape (chat), a 2D chat environment
- A plugin for Autodesk 3ds Max
- Dreamscape Immersive, a virtual reality company
- Dreamscape Publishing, an American audiobook and video publishing company owned by RBMedia
- Dreamscape Entertainment, a subsidiary and production studio owned by ABS-CBN Corporation
