= 1998 New York Attorney General election =

- November 3, 1998
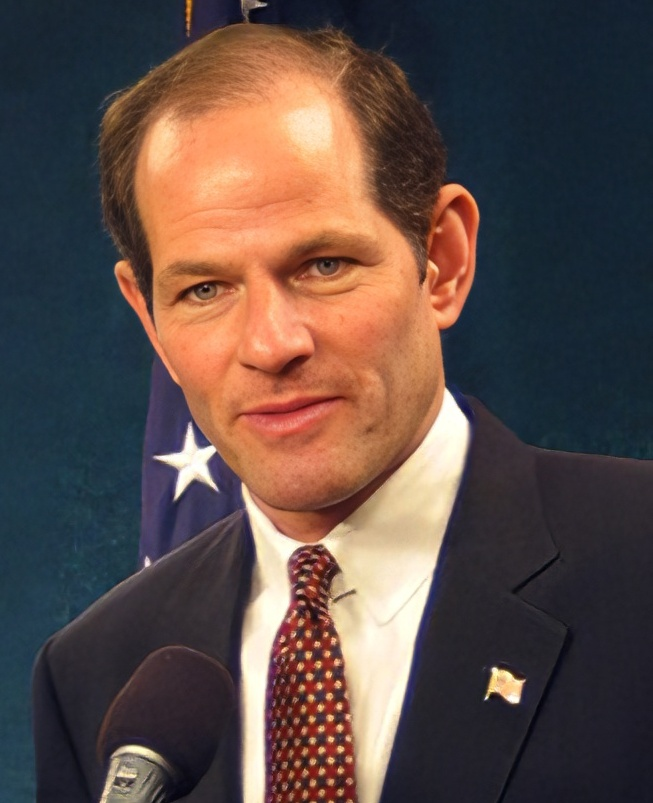

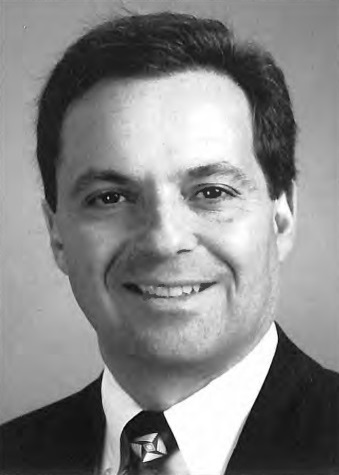
Nominee	Eliot Spitzer	Dennis Vacco
Party	Democratic	Republican
Popular vote	2,084,948	2,059,762
Percentage	48.2%	47.6%
- County results Spitzer: 40–50% 50–60% 60–70% 70–80% 80–90% Vacco: 40–50% 50–60% 60–70% 70–80%
Attorney General before election
Dennis Vacco
Republican
Elected Attorney General
Eliot Spitzer
Democratic

The 1998 New York Attorney General election took place on November 3, 1998 along with elections to the United States Senate in other states as well as elections to the United States House of Representatives and various state and local elections. Democratic challenger Eliot Spitzer unseated one-term Republican incumbent Dennis Vacco in a major upset, with Vacco conceding on December 14, after accusing New York City voters, primarily in predominantly Black and Latino areas, of voter fraud.

== Democratic primary ==
=== Candidates ===
- Catherine Abate, State Senator from Manhattan
- Evan A. Davis, former counsel to Governor Mario Cuomo
- Oliver Koppell, former Attorney General and State Assemblyman from the Bronx
- Eliot Spitzer, white collar defense attorney and candidate in 1994

=== Polling ===
Source	Date	Oliver Koppell	Catherine Abate	Eliot Spitzer	Evan Davis
Quinnipiac	February 26, 1998	7%	7%	2%	5%
Quinnipiac	July 16, 1998	16%	13%	18%	-

=== Statewide Results ===
New York Democratic Attorney General primary, 1998
Party	Candidate	Votes	%	±%
Democratic	Eliot Spitzer	279,180	41.54%	
Democratic	Catherine Abate	186,626	27.77%	
Democratic	Oliver Koppell	145,231	21.61%	
Democratic	Evan A. Davis	60,978	9.07%	
Majority		92,554	13.77%	
Turnout		672,015	%	

== General election ==
=== Polling ===
Source	Date	Dennis Vacco (R)	Eliot Spitzer (D)
Quinnipiac	September 27, 1998	46%	37%
Quinnipiac	October 15, 1998	45%	33%
Quinnipiac	October 28, 1998	47%	34%

== Results ==
1998 New York Attorney General Election
Party	Candidate	Votes	%	±%
Democratic	Eliot Spitzer	2,018,591	46.67%	+1.63%
Liberal	Eliot Spitzer	66,357	1.53%	−0.81%
Total	Eliot Spitzer	2,084,948	48.20%	+0.82%
Republican	Dennis Vacco	1,757,539	40.63%	−2.08%
Conservative	Dennis Vacco	302,223	6.99%	+0.42%
Total	Dennis Vacco (incumbent)	2,059,762	47.62%	−1.66%
Independence	Catherine M. Abate	81,439	1.88%	+1.07%
Right to Life	Robert W. Dapelo	60,399	1.40%	−0.44%
Libertarian	Daniel A. Conti Jr.	19,864	0.46%	+0.05%
Green	Johann L. Moore	18,984	0.44%	NA
Turnout		4,325,396		−7.65%
Democratic gain from Republican				

== See also ==
Preceded by 1994	New York Attorney General election 1998	Succeeded by 2002
