= Eric Dinowitz =

American politician (born 1985)

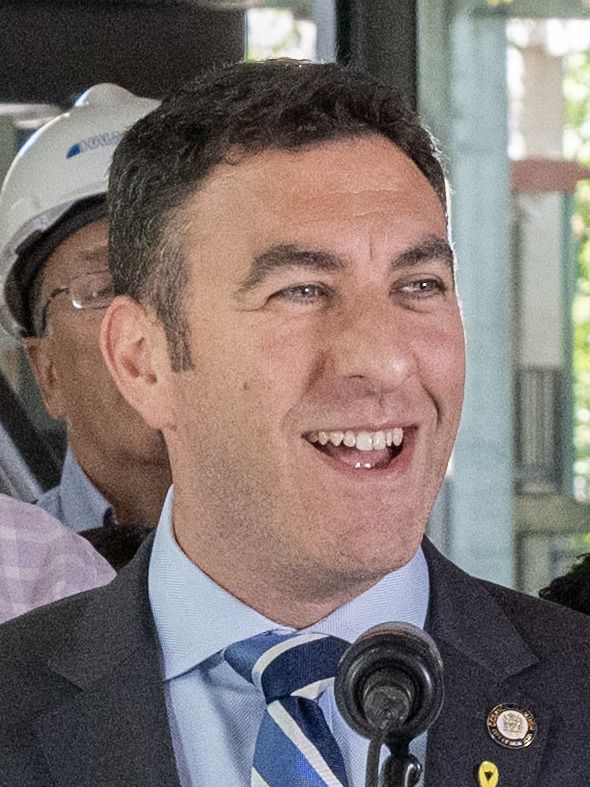
- Dinowitz in 2025

Member of the New York City Council from the 11th district
- Incumbent
- Assumed office April 15, 2021
- Preceded by: Andrew Cohen

Personal details
- Born: November 21, 1985 (age 40) New York City, New York, U.S.
- Party: Democratic
- Spouse: Tamar Dinowitz
- Children: 2
- Relatives: Jeffrey Dinowitz (father)
- Education: Binghamton University (BA); Hunter College (MEd)
- Website: Official website

Eric Dinowitz (born November 21, 1985) is an American teacher and politician. Dinowitz represents the 11th district of the New York City Council. Dinowitz is a registered Democrat. Dinowitz was elected in a special election held on March 23, 2021, after the resignation of Andrew Cohen, who was elected to the New York Supreme Court. Dinowitz assumed office on April 15, 2021 after weeks of the New York City Board of Elections counting ranked-choice voting ballots which were instituted for municipal elections beginning in 2021.

The 11th district includes Bedford Park, Kingsbridge, Norwood, Riverdale, Van Cortlandt Village, Wakefield, and Woodlawn Heights in The Bronx.

== Life and career ==
Dinowitz was born in 1985 to New York State Assemblyman Jeffrey Dinowitz and Sylvia Gottlieb in the Northwestern Bronx. He graduated from the Bronx High School of Science and received his bachelor's degree from Binghamton University, SUNY, followed by a master's degree in education from Hunter College, CUNY. Dinowitz spent fifteen years as a special education classroom teacher in the New York City Public Schools. Eric was the Democratic District Leader for New York's 81st Assembly District and has also served as the Aging Committee Chair of the Bronx Community Board 8.

In 2021, Dinowitz was named to the City & State's Labor 40 Under 40 list.

== New York City Council ==
2025 Election Year

- In 2025, Dinowitz faced his first primary challenger since 2021. Danielle Herbert-Guggenheim announced her candidacy on December 8th. The primary was held on June 24, 2025; Dinowitz won, with challenger Herbert-Guggenheim claiming 27.9% of the vote.

2024 Term

- In 2024, Dinowitz was appointed to the following New York City Council committees:
  - Chair of the Committee on Veterans
  - Committee on Standards and Ethics
  - Committee on Civil Service and Labor
  - Committee on Education
  - Committee on Higher Education
  - Committee on Committee on Housing and Buildings
  - Subcommittee on Senior Centers and Food Insecurity

2021 Term

- In 2021, Dinowitz was appointed to the following New York City Council committees:
  - Chair of the Committee on Veterans
  - Committee on Aging
  - Committee on Civil Service and Labor
  - Committee on Education
  - Committee on Mental Health, Disabilities, and Addictions
  - Committee on Oversight and Investigations
  - Committee on Parks and Recreation
  - Committee on Small Business

Dinowitz was also appointed Chairman of the New York City Council Jewish Caucus.

== Music ==
Dinowitz is a former member of New York-based Jewish A cappella group Six13, joining as a student while at Binghamton University. The group has performed worldwide, as well as making an appearance at the White House Hanukkah Party in 2016, hosted by President Barack Obama.

== Personal life ==
Eric is married to Tamar Dinowitz. They have twin sons, Alex and Jesse.

== Electoral history ==
=== 2025 ===
2025 New York City Council Democratic primary, District 11
Party	Candidate	Votes	%
Democratic	Eric Dinowitz (incumbent)	13,973	71.4
Democratic	Danielle Herbert-Guggenheim	5,477	28.0
Write-in		118	0.6
Total votes		19,568	100.0

2025 New York City Council election, District 11
Party	Candidate	Votes	%
Democratic	Eric Dinowitz (incumbent)	30,195	82.3
Republican	Stylo Sapaskis	4,756	13.0
Conservative	Denise Smith	1,462	4.0
Write-in		295	0.8
Total votes		36,708	100.0
Democratic hold			

=== 2023 ===
2023 New York City Council election, District 11
Party	Candidate	Votes	%
Democratic	Eric Dinowitz (incumbent)	9,594	83.7
Republican	Robert J. Caemmerer	1,335	11.7
Conservative	Robert J. Caemmerer (Note: Shared with "Medical Freedom" ballot line.)	307	2.7
Total	Robert J. Caemmerer	1,642	14.3
Write-in		223	1.9
Total votes		11,459	100.0
Democratic hold			

=== 2021 ===
2021 New York City's 11th City Council district special election
Party	Candidate	Maximum round	Maximum votes	Share in maximum round	Maximum votes First round votes Transfer votes
Your Bronx Voice	Eric Dinowitz	6	5,579	63.6%	
Justice for All	Mino Lora	6	3,188	36.4%	
New Leadership	Jessica Haller	5	1,682	18.7%	
Community First	Daniel Padernacht	4	1,204	12.9%	
Patriot	Kevin Pazmino	3	200	2.1%	
The People's	Carlton Berkley	2	172	1.8%	
Write-In		1	24	0.3%	
Democratic hold					

2021 New York City Council Democratic primary, District 11
Party	Candidate	Maximum round	Maximum votes	Share in maximum round	Maximum votes First round votes Transfer votes
Democratic	Eric Dinowitz (incumbent)	6	9,491	61.3%	
Democratic	Mino Lora	6	5,994	38.7%	
Democratic	Abigail Martin	5	3,005	18.4%	
Democratic	Daniel Padernacht	3	1,102	6.6%	
Democratic	Jessica Haller	3	1,059	6.3%	
Democratic	Marcos Sierra	2	356	2.1%	
Democratic	Carlton Berkley	2	314	1.8%	
Write-In		1	36	0.2%	

2021 New York City Council election, District 11
Party	Candidate	Votes	%
Democratic	Eric Dinowitz (incumbent)	15,416	80.4
Republican	Kevin Pazmino	2,983	15.5
Conservative	Kevin Pazmino	574	3.0
Total	Kevin Pazmino	3,557	18.5
Write-in		213	1.1
Total votes		19,186	100.0
Democratic hold			

== Notes ==
Political offices
Preceded by Andrew Cohen	Member of the New York City Council from the 11th district 2021–present	Incumbent
