= Alan Morrison (lawyer) =

American lawyer

- Born: March 10, 1938 (age 88); New York City, New York, U.S.
- Spouse: Anne Scherck
- Children: 2, including Nina Morrison

Academic background
- Education: Yale University (BA); Harvard University (LLB)

Academic work
- Discipline: Law
- Sub-discipline: Public interest law Public service law Supreme Court litigation
- Institutions: Stanford Law School; Washington College of Law; George Washington University

Alan Butler Morrison (born March 10, 1938) is an American attorney and the co-founder of Public Citizen Litigation Group.

== Early life and education ==
Morrison was born in New York City in 1938. His father was a Jewish migrant from Ukraine who later worked as a lawyer and his mother was a native of Troy, New York whose father was an immigrant from Poland. As a child, Morrison and his family lived in California while his father was serving as an officer in the United States Air Force. He spent the rest of his childhood in Larchmont, New York. He earned a Bachelor of Arts degree from Yale University in 1959 and a Bachelor of Laws from Harvard Law School in 1966. As a student at Yale, Morrison worked for WYBC and participated in the school's ROTC program.

== Career ==
After graduating from Yale, Morrison served in the United States Navy for three years. During his military service, he was stationed on bases in Japan, Hong Kong, Australia, San Francisco, and Long Beach, California. Morrison worked as an assistant U.S. attorney in the United States District Court for the Southern District of New York. In 1971, he met Ralph Nader and the two men founded Public Citizen Litigation Group, the litigating arm of the consumer advocacy group Public Citizen. Morrison served as the director of the Public Citizen Litigation Group. Over the span of his career, Morrison has argued 20 cases before the Supreme Court, most notably the key separation-of-powers case Immigration and Naturalization Service v. Chadha in 1983. He also founded the Supreme Court Assistance Project (SCAP), which assists small-firm lawyers in arguing cases before the Supreme Court. Morrison retired from Public Citizen in 2004 to work at Stanford Law School as a senior lecturer on administrative and public interest law. He has taught at various other laws schools, including Harvard. He also worked as a visiting professor of law at the Washington College of Law. In 2009, Morrison joined the George Washington University Law School as the Lerner Family Associate Dean for Public Interest and Public Service Law.

He served as the president of the American Academy of Appellate Lawyers from 1999 to 2000. Morrison is also the co-author of the 1995 book Representing Yourself : What You Can Do Without a Lawyer.

== Personal life ==
Morrison and his wife, Anne (née Scherck), have two daughters, Rebecca and Nina.
