= Andrew Cohen (politician) =

American politician

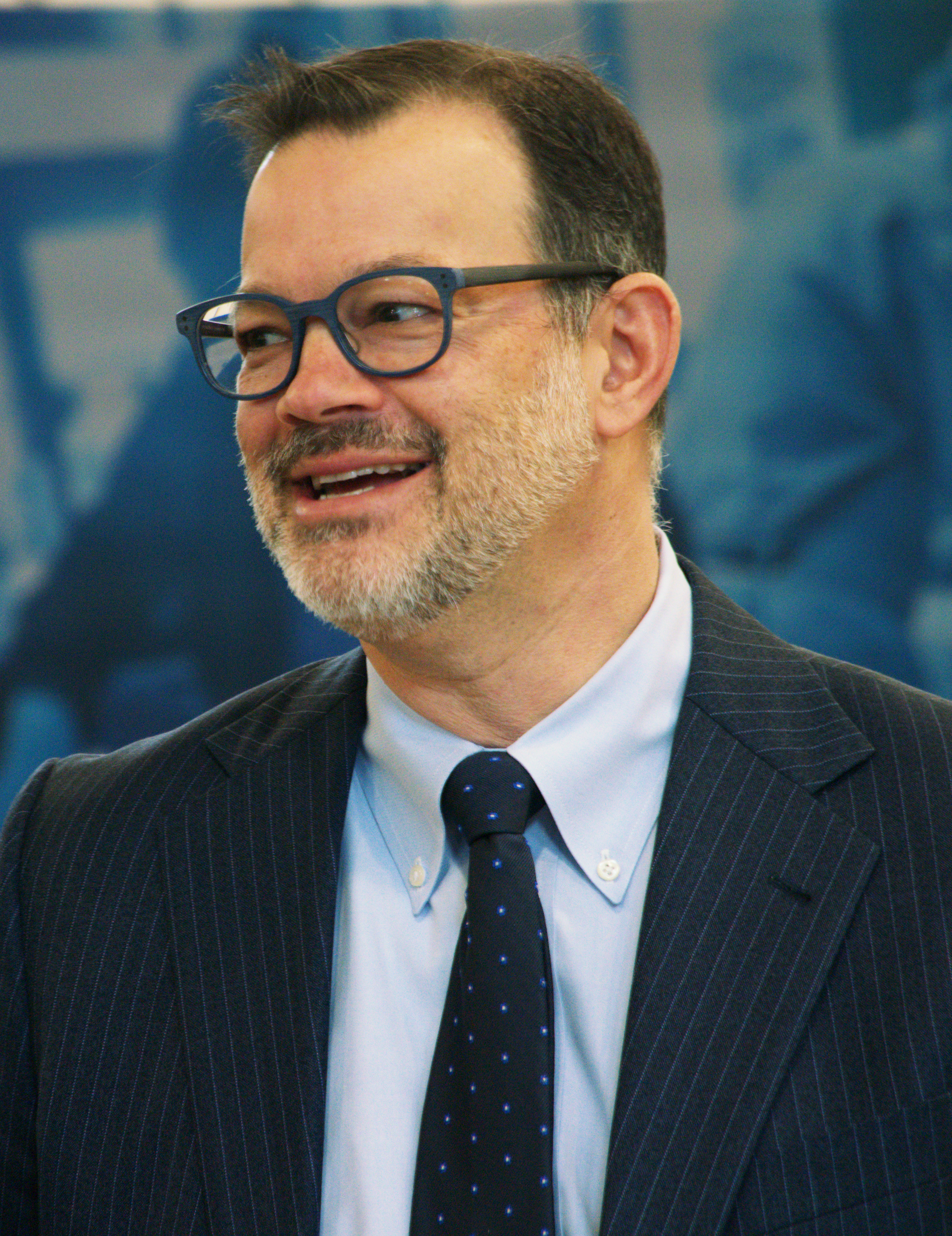

Member of the New York City Council from the 11th district
- In office January 1, 2014 – December 31, 2020
- Preceded by: G. Oliver Koppell
- Succeeded by: Eric Dinowitz

Personal details
- Born: August 9, 1969 (age 57) Brooklyn, New York, U.S.
- Party: Democratic
- Spouse: Dr. Heather Erhard
- Children: 1
- Education: SUNY New Paltz (BA); Benjamin N. Cardozo School of Law (JD)

Andrew Cohen (born August 9, 1969) is a Justice of the Bronx branch of the New York Supreme Court. He is a Democrat. He was previously the councilmember for the 11th district of the New York City Council, resigning in 2020, with Eric Dinowitz winning the special election to succeed him. The district includes Bedford Park, Kingsbridge, Norwood, Riverdale, Van Cortlandt Village, Wakefield, and Woodlawn Heights in The Bronx.

== Life and career ==
Cohen was born on August 9, 1969, in Brooklyn. He earned a B.A. in sociology from SUNY New Paltz and a J.D. from the Cardozo School of Law, and is an attorney.

Prior to joining the New York City Council, Cohen served as a member of Bronx Community Board 8 and legal advisor to Assemblyman Jeffrey Dinowitz. He was also an adjunct professor at the CUNY John Jay College of Criminal Justice and a court attorney to a justice of the Bronx Supreme Court.

== New York City Council ==
Councilman G. Oliver Koppell was term-limited in 2013 and unable to run for another term, and as a result, Cohen entered the race to succeed him. After winning the primary, he was elected to a full term in November 2013. He was reelected in 2017, receiving 84.39% of the vote.Cohen ran for Supreme Court Justice in the Bronx in November 2020, and resigned from the New York City Council, ending his term on December 31, 2020.

== Election history ==
New York City Council: District 11
Election	Candidate	Party	Votes	Pct	Candidate	Party	Votes	Pct
2013 Primary	Andrew Cohen	Dem	8,039	68.42%	Clifford Stanton	Dem	3,711	31.58%
2013 General	Andrew Cohen	Dem	15,664	79.65%	Bryan A. Cooper	Rep	2,379	12.10%
2017 General	Andrew Cohen	Dem	16,807	84.39%	Judah David Powers	Rep	2,736	13.74%

Political offices
Preceded by G. Oliver Koppell	New York City Council, 11th district 2014–2020	Succeeded by Eric Dinowitz
