= Dennis Vacco =

American lawyer and politician

Dennis C. Vacco
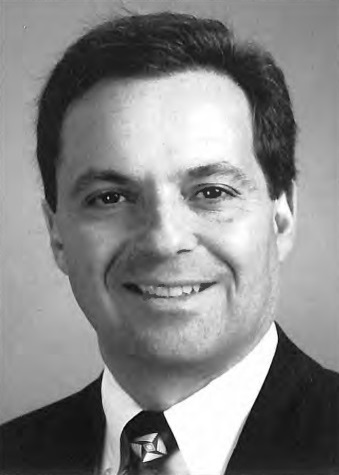

62nd Attorney General of New York
- In office January 1, 1995 – December 31, 1998
- Governor: George Pataki
- Preceded by: Oliver Koppell
- Succeeded by: Eliot Spitzer

United States Attorney for the Western District of New York
- In office 1988–1993
- President: Ronald Reagan; George H. W. Bush
- Preceded by: Roger P. Williams
- Succeeded by: Patrick H. NeMoyer

Personal details
- Born: August 16, 1952 (age 74) Buffalo, New York, U.S.
- Party: Republican
- Spouse: Kelly Vacco
- Children: 2
- Education: Colgate University (BA); University at Buffalo (JD)
- Profession: Lawyer

Dennis C. Vacco (born August 16, 1952) is an American lawyer and Republican Party politician. He graduated with a B.A. from Colgate University in 1974, a J.D. from the University at Buffalo Law School in 1978, and was admitted to the New York State bar in 1979. He is to date the last Republican to serve as New York Attorney General.

== Background ==
Vacco was born in Buffalo, New York, and was raised in the western region of upstate New York.

== Political career ==
=== As Erie County Assistant District Attorney ===
Vacco was an Assistant District Attorney of Erie County, New York from 1978 to 1988, and United States Attorney for the Western District of New York from 1988 until the beginning of the Clinton administration in 1993.

=== As Attorney General of New York ===
Vacco was the Attorney General of New York from January 1, 1995 to December 31, 1998.

==== 1994 election ====
In 1994, Vacco defeated Karen Burstein, the Democratic nominee. One week before the election, Staten Island Borough President Guy Molinari announced that Burstein was not qualified to serve as attorney general because she was a lesbian. The combination of Molinari's remarks, a strong national Republican showing, and the win of George Pataki in the governor's race, led to Vacco narrowly defeating Burstein. The New York Times called Molinari's remarks, "gutter politics."

==== Selected cases ====
Vacco brought national attention through a series of prosecutions brought against internet service providers, including Dreamscape Online, for distributing child pornography. The principal defendant, Buffnet, eventually pleaded guilty to a charge of fourth degree facilitation of a felony and was fined $5,000.

Vacco played a prominent role in New York City Mayor Rudy Giuliani's attempt to require Time Warner Cable to carry the Fox News Channel. An attempt by Vacco to bring an anti-trust violation charge against Time-Warner failed.

As attorney general, Vacco also argued the landmark assisted suicide case Vacco v. Quill before the United States Supreme Court. He successfully defended the state's ban on the practice, winning the case by a 9–0 vote.

==== 1998 Election ====
In 1998, Vacco was defeated in his bid for re-election by Democrat Eliot Spitzer, by a margin of approximately 0.6% of the votes cast. He was the first attorney general in New York since 1925 to not be re-elected to a second term.

== Electoral history ==
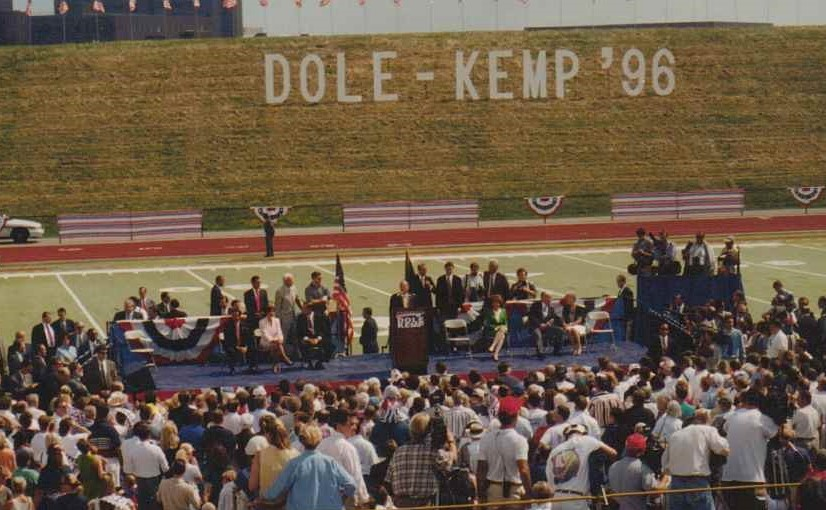
Dennis Vacco (Seated on main stage, front, far left end) at 1996 Dole-Kemp Rally at the University at Buffalo, N.Y.

Vacco's electoral history has been tracked, online, at Our Campaigns, and it has been reflected here.

New York Attorney General election, 1998
Party	Candidate	Votes	%	±%
Democratic	Eliot Spitzer	2,084,948	48.20	
Republican	Dennis Vacco (incumbent)	2,059,762	47.62	
Independence	Catherine Abate	81,439	1.88	
Right to Life	Robert W. Dapelo	60,399	1.40	
Libertarian	Daniel A. Conti, Jr.	19,864	0.46	
Green	Johann L. Moore	18,984	0.44	

- Vacco also ran on the Conservative Party of New York ticket in this election.

New York Attorney General election, 1994
Party	Candidate	Votes	%	±%
Republican	Dennis Vacco	2,294,528	49.28	
Democratic	Karen S. Burstein	2,206,188	47.38	
Right to Life	Alfred I. Skidmore	85,649	1.84	
Independence	Thomas M. Hartman	37,500	0.81	
Libertarian	Dan Conti	19,202	0.41	

- Nancy Rosenstock also received 13,416 votes (0.29%) for the Socialist Workers Party in this election.
- Vacco also ran on both the Conservative Party of New York and Tax Cut Now tickets in this election.

== Post-political career ==
Less than two months after he concluded an antitrust settlement with Waste Management, Inc., a waste disposal conglomerate, as one of his last acts before leaving his position as attorney general, Vacco joined Waste Management as a senior lobbyist and vice president for government affairs for their operations in New York, New England, and Canada. In response to questions about the settlement and the job offer, Vacco said: "Any interpretation or suggestion that this settlement - which included the United States Department of Justice - was connected to my employment by Waste Management - is preposterous and false."

As a lobbyist in New York State, Vacco was identified as having made inconsistencies in required filings. In April 2006, after a six-month investigation, Vacco was cleared of allegations that he violated lobbying regulations. The investigation "centered on whether Vacco’s firm had an illegal contingency-fee contract with a Rochester businessman in exchange for helping him win a casino deal with an Oklahoma tribe." In October 2005, Vacco’s lobbying firm agreed to pay the state $50,000 in connection with the questionable contract, but it was not required to admit wrongdoing."

Vacco is currently a partner in the Buffalo, New York law firm of Lippes Mathias Wexler Friedman, LLP.

Party political offices
Preceded by Bernard C. Smith	Republican nominee for Attorney General of New York; 1994, 1998	Succeeded by Dora Irizarry
Legal offices
Preceded by G. Oliver Koppell	Attorney General of New York; 1995–1998	Succeeded by Eliot Spitzer
