= 2002 New York Attorney General election =

- November 5, 2002
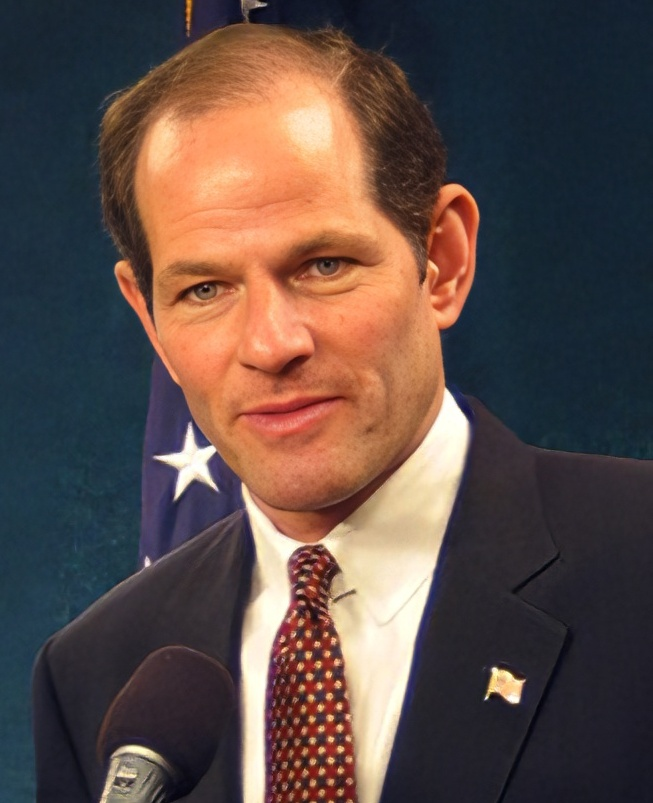

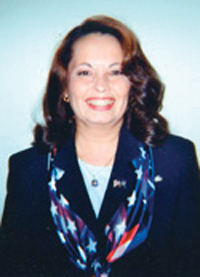
Nominee	Eliot Spitzer	Dora Irizarry
Party	Democratic	Republican
Popular vote	2,744,302	1,234,899
Percentage	66.42%	29.89%
- County results Spitzer: 40–50% 50–60% 60–70% 70–80% 80–90% Irizarry: 40–50% 50–60%
Attorney General before election
Eliot Spitzer
Democratic
Elected Attorney General
Eliot Spitzer
Democratic

The 2002 election was held on November 5 to elect the Attorney General of New York. Democratic incumbent Eliot Spitzer was reelected by a wide margin, defeating Republican Dora Irizarry. This is the most recent New York Attorney General election in which the winner won a majority of counties.

== General election ==
=== Polling ===
Source	Date	Eliot Spitzer (D)	Dora Irizarry (R)
Quinnipiac	September 26, 2002	58%	19%
Quinnipiac	October 16, 2002	64%	20%
Quinnipiac	November 4, 2002	68%	18%

=== Results ===
General election results
Party	Candidate	Votes	%
Democratic	Eliot Spitzer	2,346,991	56.81%
Independence	Eliot Spitzer	256,915	6.22%
Working Families	Eliot Spitzer	94,590	2.29%
Liberal	Eliot Spitzer	45,806	1.11%
Total	Eliot Spitzer (incumbent)	2,744,302	66.42%
Republican	Dora Irizarry	1,110,242	26.87%
Conservative	Dora Irizarry	124,657	3.02%
Total	Dora Irizarry	1,234,899	29.89%
Right to Life	John Broderick	78,268	1.89%
Green	Mary Jo Long	50,755	1.23%
Libertarian	Daniel Conti Jr.	23,213	0.56%
Total votes		4,131,437	100.00%
Democratic hold			

== See also ==
- New York gubernatorial election, 2002
- New York Comptroller election, 2002
- United States House of Representatives elections in New York, 2002

Preceded by 1998	New York Attorney General election 2002	Succeeded by 2006
