= Dora Irizarry =

Puerto Rican judge (born 1955)

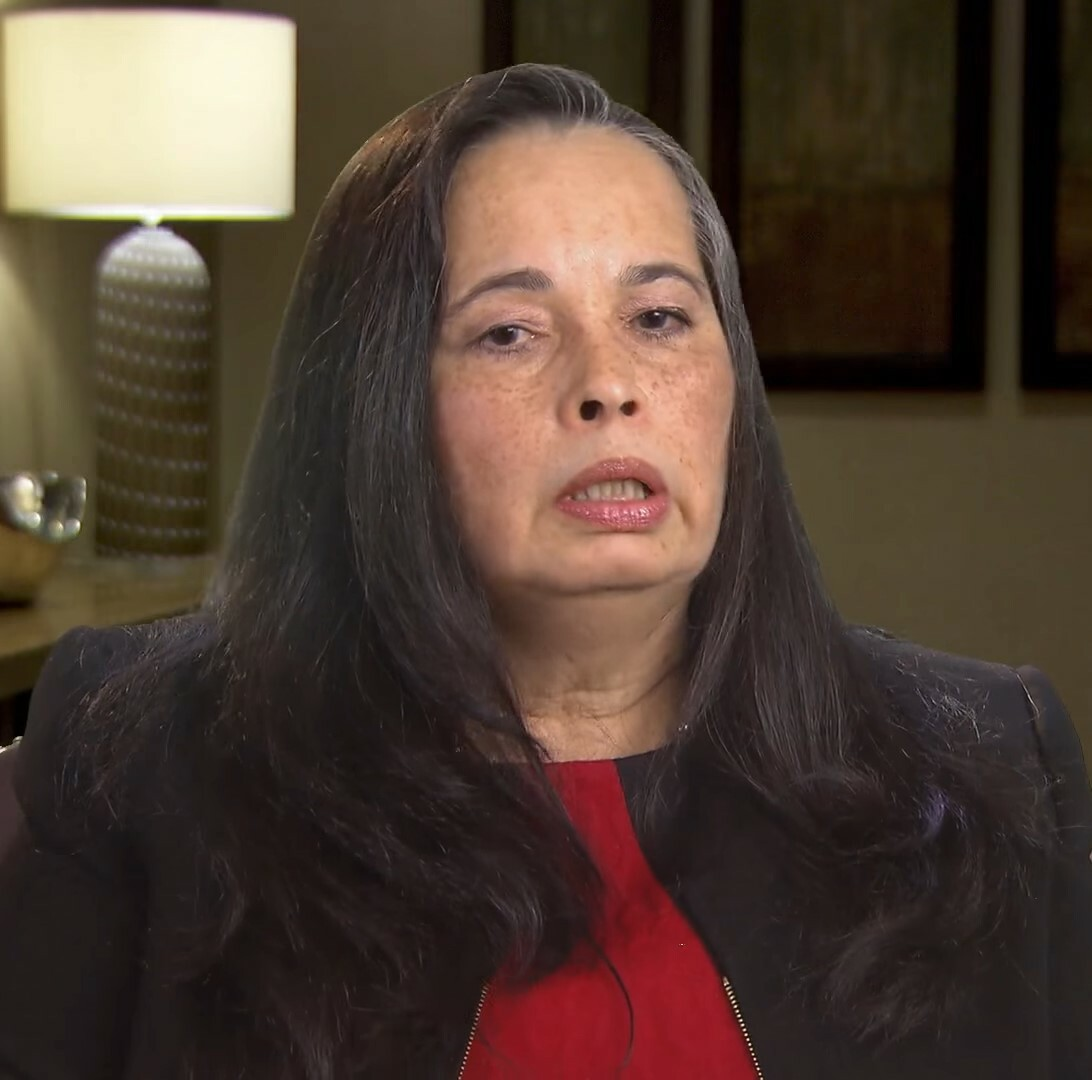
- Irizarry in 2017

Senior Judge of the United States District Court for the Eastern District of New York
- Incumbent
- Assumed office January 26, 2020

Chief Judge of the United States District Court for the Eastern District of New York
- In office April 3, 2016 – January 26, 2020
- Preceded by: Carol Amon
- Succeeded by: Roslynn R. Mauskopf

Judge of the United States District Court for the Eastern District of New York
- In office July 8, 2004 – January 26, 2020
- Appointed by: George W. Bush
- Preceded by: Reena Raggi
- Succeeded by: Nina Morrison

Personal details
- Born: January 26, 1955 (age 71) San Sebastian, Puerto Rico
- Party: Republican
- Education: Yale University (BA); Columbia Law School (JD)

Dora Lizette Irizarry (born January 26, 1955) is a senior United States District Court Judge of the United States District Court for the Eastern District of New York.

== Early life and education ==
Irizarry was born on January 26, 1955, in San Sebastian, Puerto Rico, and was raised in the Bronx in New York City. She attended the Bronx High School of Science and went on to graduate from Yale University with a Bachelor of Arts degree in 1976 and Columbia Law School with a Juris Doctor in 1979. After law school, she worked as an assistant district attorney in the Bronx and Manhattan from 1979 to 1981. Irizarry said she wanted to improve the quality of life in the neighborhoods in which she grew up, and specialized in drug and narcotics cases.

== Career ==
=== New York state court judge ===
She was appointed a New York City Criminal Court judge by former Mayor Rudolph Giuliani and then a judge of the New York Court of Claims by Governor George Pataki. As a Court of Claims judge, she served as an Acting Justice of the New York State Supreme Court, sitting in Brooklyn and Manhattan. She was the first Hispanic woman to serve as a state judge in New York.

She was an assistant district attorney of the Office of the Special Narcotics Prosecutor in the Bronx County District Attorney's Office from 1981 to 1987 and then in the New York County District Attorney's Office from 1987 to 1995. She then became a judge on the New York City Criminal Court from 1995 to 1997, and an Acting Justice on the Court of Claims in Kings County from 1997 to 1998, before serving in the same position in Manhattan from 1998 to 2002.

=== 2002 New York Attorney General election ===
In 2002, Irizarry resigned from her judgeship to become the Republican nominee for Attorney General of New York, challenging Democratic incumbent Eliot Spitzer. She was the first Latina to seek statewide office in New York State. Irizarry lost the race by a 66%-30% margin, but ran a strong race in upstate New York. After the election, she entered private practice with the firm of Hoguet, Newman & Regal in Manhattan.

=== Federal judicial service ===
In 2003, Irizarry was nominated by President George W. Bush to serve as a United States district judge of the United States District Court for the Eastern District of New York. Although the American Bar Association determined her to be "not qualified," she was confirmed by the Senate on June 24, 2004, and received her commission on July 8, 2004, thereby becoming the first Hispanic judge in the Eastern District. She became Chief Judge of the Eastern District on April 15, 2016. Her judicial seat is in Brooklyn. She assumed senior status on January 26, 2020.

=== Notable cases ===
On December 15, 2010, Judge Irizarry sentenced Islamist militant and engineer Abdul Kadir, 58, of Guyana, to life in prison after the jury found him and co-defendant Russel Defreitas, a U.S. citizen born in Guyana, guilty of planning to blow up New York City's John F. Kennedy International Airport by exploding fuel tanks and pipelines underneath it. She sentenced Defreitas to life in prison on February 17, 2011. One month previously, she had sentenced Abdel Nur, a co-defendant who pleaded guilty, to 15 years, and the following year, Kareem Ibrahim, who was tried separately, was also found guilty and given a life sentence by Judge Irizarry.

== See also ==
- List of first women lawyers and judges in New York
- List of Hispanic and Latino American jurists
- List of Puerto Ricans

Party political offices
Preceded by Dennis Vacco	Republican Nominee for New York State Attorney General; 2002	Succeeded by Jeanine Pirro
Legal offices
Preceded by Reena Raggi	Judge of the United States District Court for the Eastern District of New York; 2004–2020	Succeeded by Nina Morrison
Preceded by Carol Amon	Chief Judge of the United States District Court for the Eastern District of New York; 2016–2020	Succeeded by Roslynn R. Mauskopf
