= Mark Americus Costantino =

American judge

Senior Judge of the United States District Court for the Eastern District of New York
- In office December 1, 1987 – June 17, 1990

Judge of the United States District Court for the Eastern District of New York
- In office May 20, 1971 – December 1, 1987
- Appointed by: Richard Nixon
- Preceded by: Seat established by 84 Stat. 294
- Succeeded by: Carol Amon

Personal details
- Born: Mark Americus Costantino; April 9, 1920 Staten Island, New York
- Died: June 17, 1990 (aged 70) Staten Island, New York
- Education: Brooklyn Law School (LL.B.)

Mark Americus Costantino (April 9, 1920 – June 17, 1990) was a United States district judge of the United States District Court for the Eastern District of New York.

== Education and career ==
Born in Staten Island, New York, Costantino served as a private in the United States Army from 1942 to 1946, and then received a Bachelor of Laws from Brooklyn Law School in 1947. He was a special deputy state attorney general of New York from 1947 to 1951, then entered private practice in Staten Island until 1956. He was a judge of the City Court of New York City from 1956 to 1966, and of the New York Civil Court from 1966 to 1971. Throughout this time, he was an acting judge of the New York Supreme Court (the trial court of New York), Second Judicial Department.

== Federal judicial service ==
Costantino was nominated by President Richard Nixon on April 26, 1971, to the United States District Court for the Eastern District of New York, to a new seat authorized by 84 Stat. 294. He was confirmed by the United States Senate on May 20, 1971, and received his commission on May 20, 1971. He assumed senior status on December 1, 1987. His service terminated on June 17, 1990, due to his death in Staten Island.

During his last year on the bench, several convictions and sentences that Constantino entered were overturned on appeal due to the appearance of bias and ethnic prejudice Constantino exhibited. In that case, while sentencing defendants from Colombia, Constantino made remarks such as "They don't have too much regard for Judges. They only killed 32 Chief Judges in that nation. Their regard for the judicial system, the men who run their laws, I'm glad I'm in America." and "They should have stayed where they were. Nobody told them to come here." The United States Court of Appeals for the Second Circuit also noted numerous errors Constantino made at trial, during which he clashed with the defense lawyers and twice held one of them in contempt. The appeals court concluded that "there were enough questionable rulings and incidents in the instant case to support appellants' claim of apparent bias and unfairness."

Legal offices
Preceded by Seat established by 84 Stat. 294	Judge of the United States District Court for the Eastern District of New York; 1971–1987	Succeeded by Carol Amon
