= Carol Amon =

American judge (born 1946)

Carol Bagley Amon
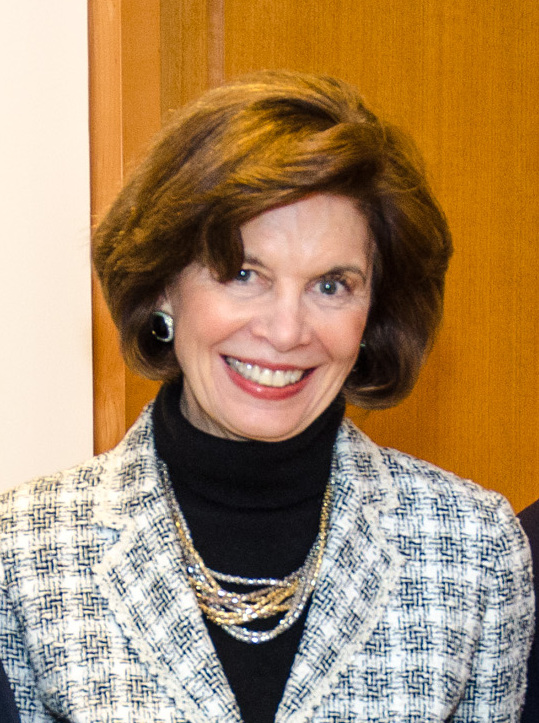
- Amon in 2014

Senior Judge of the United States District Court for the Eastern District of New York
- Incumbent
- Assumed office November 30, 2016

Chief Judge of the United States District Court for the Eastern District of New York
- In office 2011–2016
- Preceded by: Raymond Dearie
- Succeeded by: Dora Irizarry

Judge of the United States District Court for the Eastern District of New York
- In office August 7, 1990 – November 30, 2016
- Appointed by: George H. W. Bush
- Preceded by: Mark Americus Costantino
- Succeeded by: Rachel Kovner

Magistrate Judge of the United States District Court for the Eastern District of New York
- In office 1986 – August 7, 1990

Personal details
- Born: Carol Ann Bagley; April 23, 1946 (age 80) Richmond, Virginia, U.S.
- Education: College of William & Mary (BS); University of Virginia (JD)

Carol Bagley Amon (née Bagley; born April 23, 1946) is a senior United States district judge of the United States District Court for the Eastern District of New York.

== Education ==
Carol Ann Bagley was born in Richmond, Virginia. She received a Bachelor of Science from College of William & Mary in 1968, then a Juris Doctor from University of Virginia School of Law in 1971.

== Career ==
Amon was a staff attorney of the Communications Satellite Corporation in Washington, D.C. from 1971 to 1973. She was then a trial attorney of Narcotics Task Force of the United States Department of Justice from 1973 to 1974. She was an assistant United States attorney of the Eastern District of New York from 1974 to 1986. She was chief of frauds from 1978 to 1980, and then chief of general crimes from 1981 to 1982. She was a senior litigation counsel from 1984 to 1986. During her tenure at the United States Attorney's office, she received the John Marshall Award, the highest honor conferred by the Department of Justice.

In 1983, Amon successfully prosecuted four members of the Provisional Irish Republican Army (Provisional IRA) who conspired to obtain guns, explosives and missiles for their armed campaign.

=== Federal judicial service ===
Amon was a United States magistrate judge of the United States District Court for the Eastern District of New York from 1986 to 1990. She was nominated by President George H. W. Bush to be a United States District Judge of that court on May 18, 1990, to a seat vacated by Mark A. Costantino. She was confirmed by the United States Senate on August 3, 1990, and received her commission on August 7, 1990. She served as Chief Judge from 2011 to 2016. She took senior status on November 30, 2016.

In 2009, Amon sentenced NBA referee Tim Donaghy to 15 months in federal prison for his role in fixing NBA games.

== Sources ==
Legal offices
Preceded by Mark Americus Costantino	Judge of the United States District Court for the Eastern District of New York; 1990–2016	Succeeded by Rachel Kovner
Preceded by Raymond Dearie	Chief Judge of the United States District Court for the Eastern District of New York; 2011–2016	Succeeded by Dora Irizarry
