= Hitchhiker: A Biography of Douglas Adams =

Biography of writer Douglas Adams written by M. J. Simpson

- Author: M. J. Simpson
- Language: English
- Subject: Douglas Adams
- Genre: Biography
- Publisher: Justin, Charles & Co.
- Publication date: 2003
- Publication place: United Kingdom
- ISBN: 1-932112-17-0

Hitchhiker: A Biography of Douglas Adams is a 2003 biography of writer Douglas Adams written by M. J. Simpson.
