= Nina Morrison (judge) =

American judge (born 1970)

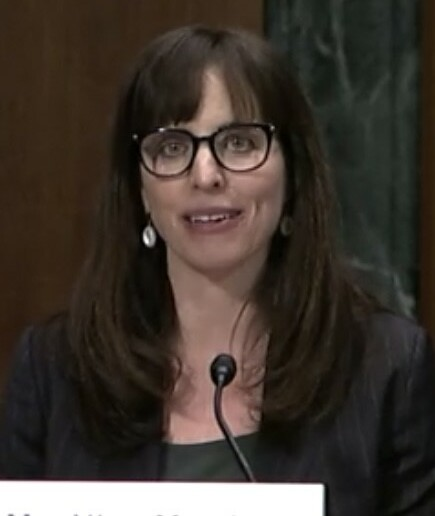

Judge of the United States District Court for the Eastern District of New York
- Incumbent
- Assumed office August 11, 2022
- Appointed by: Joe Biden
- Preceded by: Dora Irizarry

Personal details
- Born: Nina Rauh Morrison; 1970 (age 55–56) New York City, New York, U.S.
- Spouse: Carina Biggs
- Relatives: Alan Morrison (father)
- Education: Yale University (BA); New York University (JD)

Nina Rauh Morrison (born 1970) is an American lawyer who serves as a United States district judge of the United States District Court for the Eastern District of New York. As part of her work for the Innocence Project, she had been lead or co-counsel in cases that have freed more than 30 wrongly convicted people from prison and death row.

== Education ==
Morrison was born in 1970 in New York City. She received a Bachelor of Arts from Yale University in 1992 and a Juris Doctor from the New York University School of Law in 1998.

== Career ==
From 1992 to 1995, Morrison was an investigator with the California appellate projects, which represents California's death row inmates in post-conviction proceedings.

Morrison began her legal career as a law clerk for Judge Pierre N. Leval of the United States Court of Appeals for the Second Circuit from 1998 to 1999. She was then an associate at Emery, Celli, Brinckerhoff & Abady from 1999 to 2001 focusing on civil rights law.

She joined the Innocence Project in 2002, where she served as executive director until 2004, leading the organization's transition from a law school clinic to an independent nonprofit organization. As senior litigation counsel at the Innocence Project, Morrison served as lead or co-counsel in cases that freed more than 30 wrongly convicted people from prison and death row. From 2002 to 2016, she was an adjunct professor of law at the Benjamin N. Cardozo School of Law of Yeshiva University. In 2017, Morrison served as an advisor to the transition committees for District Attorney of Philadelphia Larry Krasner and Los Angeles County District Attorney George Gascón in 2020.

=== Federal judicial service ===
On December 15, 2021, President Joe Biden nominated Morrison to serve as a United States district judge of the United States District Court for the Eastern District of New York. President Biden nominated Morrison to the seat vacated by Judge Dora Irizarry, who assumed senior status on January 26, 2020. On February 16, 2022, a hearing on her nomination was held before the Senate Judiciary Committee. During her hearing, Morrison was questioned by several Republican senators over her understanding of criminal statutes and her past support for progressive prosecutors. On March 10, 2022, her nomination was reported out of committee by a 12–10 vote. On May 24, 2022, the United States Senate invoked cloture on her nomination by a 50–41 vote. On June 8, 2022, her nomination was confirmed by a 53–46 vote. She received her judicial commission on August 11, 2022.

Since receiving her judicial commission, Morrison has been five times reversed or stayed by the United States Court of Appeals for the Second Circuit in criminal cases, including United States v. Jason Robinson, No. 25-1428 (2d Cir. Oct. 1, 2026), United States v. Burvick, No. 25-351 (2d Cir. July 31, 2026), United States v. Garnes, 102 F.4th 628 (2d Cir. 2024), and United States v. Johnston, No. 23-1277, Dkt. No. 18 (2d Cir. Sept. 19, 2023). Similarly, the Second Circuit in United States v. Alisigwe, No. 24-960 (2d Cir. 2026) abrogated Morrison's decision relating to the border search exception: United States v. Sultanov, 742 F.Supp.3d 258 (E.D.N.Y 2024).

== Personal life ==
Morrison's father, Alan Morrison, is a lawyer and academic has been the Public Interest Dean of the George Washington University Law School since 2009. She and her wife, surgeon Dr. Carina Biggs, were married on July 29th, 2011. Morrison is the second openly LGBTQ judge on the U.S. District Court for the Eastern District of New York.

== See also ==
- List of LGBT jurists in the United States

Legal offices
Preceded by Dora Irizarry	Judge of the United States District Court for the Eastern District of New York; 2022–present	Incumbent
