= Dreamscape (2007 film) =

- Directed by: Daniel J. Fox
- Written by: Daniel J. Fox
- Produced by: Daniel J. Fox; Mark Ellingham
- Starring: Daniel J. Fox; Sandra Darnell; Mark Ellingham
- Cinematography: Daniel J. Fox; Mark Ellingham
- Edited by: Daniel J. Fox
- Music by: Joseph A. Fox
- Production company: Chat Noir Productions
- Release date: 1 June 2007 (UK original version)
- Running time: 86 minutes
- Country: United Kingdom
- Language: English
- Budget: £5,000

Dreamscape is a 2007 science fiction thriller style black-and-white film noir written and directed by Daniel J. Fox as the first feature film made by UK based Indie production company Chat Noir Productions Ltd.

== Plot ==
After hearing about Dreamscape Inc., a company that provides custom fantasies directly to a subscriber's brain as he sleeps, a bored businessman (Daniel J. Fox) visits the sales offices and signs up for the service. After an outpatient procedure to implant a receiver in his head, he goes home and begins to dream about being an unstoppable secret agent whose mission is to deliver a confidential package to a contact. In his electronic fantasies, he tackles rival agents, wins the affections of "The Girl" (Sandra Darnell), and keeps one step ahead of his nemesis "The Investigator" (Mark Ellingham). But the fantasy turns sour and reality and illusion begin to blur.

== Partial cast ==
- Daniel J. Fox as The Businessman
- Sandra Darnell as The Girl
- Mark Ellingham as The Investigator
- Frank Pipkin as The Chief
- Richard Dodd as The Salesman
- Mike Lockley as The Broker
- Magda Rodriguez as The Secretary
- Abigail Fox as The Nurse
- Ian Paul as Agent #1
- Joseph A. Fox as Agent #2
- Gemma Nicholas as Agent #3
- Steven Madden as The Contact
- Chris Owen as The Lookout
- Sammi Gravestock as The newsreader

== Production ==
Pre-production began in 2005 and the film was shot on locations in Birkenhead, Wallasey, Liverpool, Chester, Ellesmere Port, Neston and Wrexham. The film won 'Feature Film Award' at the 2008 Wirral International Film Festival held in Birkenhead. Film and television journalist M. J. Simpson, former deputy editor of SFX, reviewed the film in 2007, and observed that the film needed to be longer if it were to be considered for commercial distribution. Based upon Simpson's recommendation, the film was reworked from its original 63 minute length to 86 minutes. Once the extended cut of the film was completed, Simpson in 2009 reviewed the film's new version and stated that was the first time he had ever done this.

It was originally intended that CGI be used only a few shots in the film, but during filming and expansion, additional scenes were added to increase the film's scope. The film's score by composer Joseph A. Fox was nominated for and won 'Best Feature Score in Full Length Format' at the Second Annual GoldSpirit Awards' Jerry Goldsmith Award Competition for Young Composers in 2007, and was the only UK film score to reach the final judging stages.

== Reception ==
M. J. Simpson reviewed the film upon its 2007 original release and wrote that the film was "amazing" as a "testament to the way that digital technology can unlock the creative freedom of talented indie film-makers in ways that would have seemed unbelievable only ten years ago", and that it "combines terrific production design with seamless special effects and gorgeous black-and-white photography." His critique of the film was that the script was "slightly under-developed." In comparing it to the 1990 Arnold Schwarzenegger film Total Recall, he noted that TR worked because the viewer was never certain if the action was real or in Arnold's head, and that in Dreamscape the action works because the viewer never doubts that the events on screen in Dreamscape are imaginary. He concludes that it was "a beautifully produced film. It doesn’t just look good, it feels good, it’s exciting and once the viewer abandons his preconceived notions and just goes with the post-Bond flow it’s a damn fine piece of film-making." Simpson also wrote that the director took his advice to extend the film.

Pulp Movies reviewed the film in 2007. Of the original 63 minute version, they wrote that the film was "good solid stuff and works well as an action oriented spy thriller. It’s also beautifully shot and really does show what can be achieved now with some intelligent use of digital effects." They also noted weaknesses in "slightly clunky dialogue and an air of predictability to the plot". They also stated that "the film was, and remains, a very impressive début. It was a very solid, well paced with strikingly effective look, but did suffer somewhat from its shortness."

M. J. Simpson, noting that this was the first time he had ever done such, reviewed the extended version upon its release in 2009. He noted that the original 63 minute film was either too short or too long for most film festivals and too short for distributors, that the original had two acts and needed a third, and that he was pleased that the director actually took his advice as a film critic to create the extended version. He wrote that the "newly added third act allows the character - and the audience - to explore the potential problems and dangers which he now faces" and concluded that the new version of the film "is all-round excellent," and that it stood "a cut above the normal sort of indie features that one sees."

Pulp Movies revisited the film upon release of an extended version in 2009. The review dealt with the director having reworked the film to produce an 86 minute extended version and wrote that while the "core of the film remains the same", some of "the action sequences had been toned down in this longer edit in order to play up the surveillance and manipulation themes that pervade the film." They further noted that an altered pacing and a "greater emphasis on the ubiquity of screens and cameras in this near future", left the reviewer with a "much greater appreciation not only just how effective the digital landscape is in this film, but also how effectively it’s used." They also noted that there was a great deal of CGI work in the film that was "seamlessly blended with the characters and sets to construct what is one of the best designed and utterly believable visions of a future cityscape I’ve seen in a long time, and one that fits perfectly with the feel of the story." They concluded that the film was able to create "an intelligent and thought-provoking plot about surveillance, manipulation and paranoia" and that the result was "a superbly well executed thriller to come up with something that is both unique and well worth watching."
