= Dreamscape Online =

ISP based in upstate New York

Dreamscape Online, LLC. is an ISP operating out of upstate New York state. It was founded in the mid-1990s in the form of the Dreamscape BBS by Scott Brennan. In 1996, Northland Communications acquired Dreamscape Online to become an integrated communication company with diverse offerings.

== Access Technology Firsts ==
Dreamscape Online earned the distinction of being the first ISP in New York state to install DSL ever, using Westell ADSL modems and BANA local loop circuits. The first test circuit was installed at an employee's apartment on Hawley Ave in 1996/1997 (check date?) and provided a 1.5 Mbit/s downstream and 384 kbit/s upstream connection.

Dreamscape Online was also one of the first ISPs to implement 56k modem technology. After extensive testing of US Robotics' X2 technology, versus Rockwell's K56Flex technology, Dreamscape determined that K56Flex was the superior technology through extensive testing of over 200,000 individual connection tests. Dreamscape then invested heavily in K56Flex RAS equipment, and was later rewarded when the V.90 standard "winner" of the 56k dialup modem technology was the Rockwell K56Flex technology.

Dreamscape also pioneered the installation of IDSL at 128 kbit/s speeds (with ISDN signalling), as an alternative connectivity technology for customers who were too far from a central office (CO) to get ADSL/SDSL speeds. As Dreamscape's primary market is Syracuse, NY, this is a common occurrence in the outlying areas.

As a result of being acquired by Northland Communications, Dreamscape Online was afforded the opportunity to be one of the few ISPs to merge the technologies of non-RBOC LEC switch technology and new IP based packet-switching technology. This included providing "converged services" to small businesses: voice channels and internet connectivity over a single physical connection (generally, a T1).

In addition to being the first ISP in NY state to provide DSL, Dreamscape also pioneered many new technologies including wireless internet, remote hosted virtual email domains (LanMail), SMTP store and forward, and was friendly to power-users and developers of dynamic web content, via ColdFusion, MS FrontPage, Perl, and PHP.

== Legal Controversies ==
In 1999, Dreamscape Online became embroiled in Dennis Vacco's attempt to regulate the internet through the "Operation Sabbatical" raid, resulting in the seizure of Usenet servers from three small ISPs in upstate NY, including Dreamscape Online. At the time, public understanding of the role of ISPs was not well understood, so New York State Attorney General Dennis Vacco believed he could end internet child pornography by shutting down local ISPs services. This attempt was viewed by many in the budding internet industry as a tactic to earn votes in an election year. He subsequently lost re-election to Eliot Spitzer, and the US government improved its methods of identifying the sources of illegal pornography - no further seizures of ISPs' equipment followed. Dreamscape Online cooperated with law enforcement and maintained the state of ISPs as Common Carriers.
