= Rachel Kovner =

American judge (born 1979)

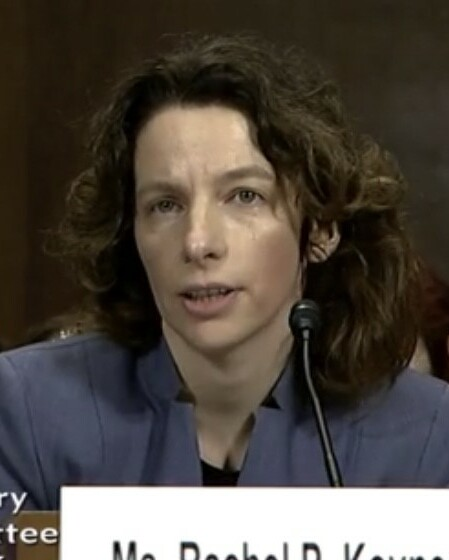

Judge of the United States District Court for the Eastern District of New York
- Incumbent
- Assumed office October 17, 2019
- Appointed by: Donald Trump
- Preceded by: Carol Amon

Personal details
- Born: Rachel Peter Kovner; September 29, 1979 (age 46) New York City, U.S.
- Parent: Bruce Kovner (father)
- Education: Harvard University (BA); Stanford University (JD)
- Rachel Kovner's voice Rachel Kovner's opening statements to the Supreme Court in National Association of Manufacturers v. Department of Defense; Recorded October 11, 2017

Rachel Peter Kovner (born September 29, 1979) is an American lawyer from New York and a United States district judge of the United States District Court for the Eastern District of New York.

== Education ==
Kovner earned her Bachelor of Arts (B.A.), magna cum laude, from Harvard College in 2001, and her Juris Doctor (J.D.) from Stanford Law School in 2006, where she graduated with the highest GPA in the school's history, was inducted into the Order of the Coif, and served as the senior articles editor of the Stanford Law Review.

== Legal career ==
At the start of her legal career, she served as a law clerk to Judge J. Harvie Wilkinson III of the United States Court of Appeals for the Fourth Circuit from 2006 to 2007, and then for Justice Antonin Scalia of the Supreme Court of the United States from 2007 to 2008.

Prior to her service in the United States Department of Justice's Office of the Solicitor General, she served for four years as an Assistant United States Attorney for the Southern District of New York from 2009 to 2013, where she served as trial counsel in ten felony trials and argued seven appeals in the United States Court of Appeals for the Second Circuit.

From 2013 to 2019, she served as an assistant to the solicitor general in the Solicitor General's Office within the Department of Justice, where she had represented the United States in litigation before the Supreme Court. She has argued thirteen cases before the Supreme Court and has briefed eleven additional cases.

== Federal judicial service ==
In August 2017, Kovner was one of several candidates pitched to New York senators Chuck Schumer and Kirsten Gillibrand by the White House as judicial candidates for vacancies on the federal courts in New York. On May 10, 2018, President Donald Trump announced his intent to nominate Kovner to serve as a United States district judge for the United States District Court for the Eastern District of New York. On May 15, 2018, her nomination was sent to the Senate. She was nominated to the seat that was vacated by Judge Carol Amon, who assumed senior status on November 30, 2016. On August 1, 2018, a hearing on her nomination was held before the Senate Judiciary Committee. On September 13, 2018, her nomination was reported out of committee by a 21–0 vote.

On January 3, 2019, her nomination was returned to the President under Rule XXXI, Paragraph 6 of the United States Senate. On April 8, 2019, President Trump announced the renomination of Kovner to the district court. On May 21, 2019, her nomination was sent to the Senate. On June 20, 2019, her nomination was reported out of committee by a 21–1 vote. On October 16, 2019, the Senate invoked cloture on her nomination by a 85–3 vote. Her nomination was confirmed later that day by a 88–3 vote. She received her judicial commission on October 17, 2019. On March 28, 2025, she presented the Antonin Scalia lecture on the Roberts court's use of textualism and purposivism at the Harvard Law School which was published later on YouTube.

== See also ==
- List of law clerks for the ninth seat of the Supreme Court of the United States

Legal offices
Preceded by Carol Amon	Judge of the United States District Court for the Eastern District of New York; 2019–present	Incumbent
