= Oliver Koppell =

New York politician (born 1940)

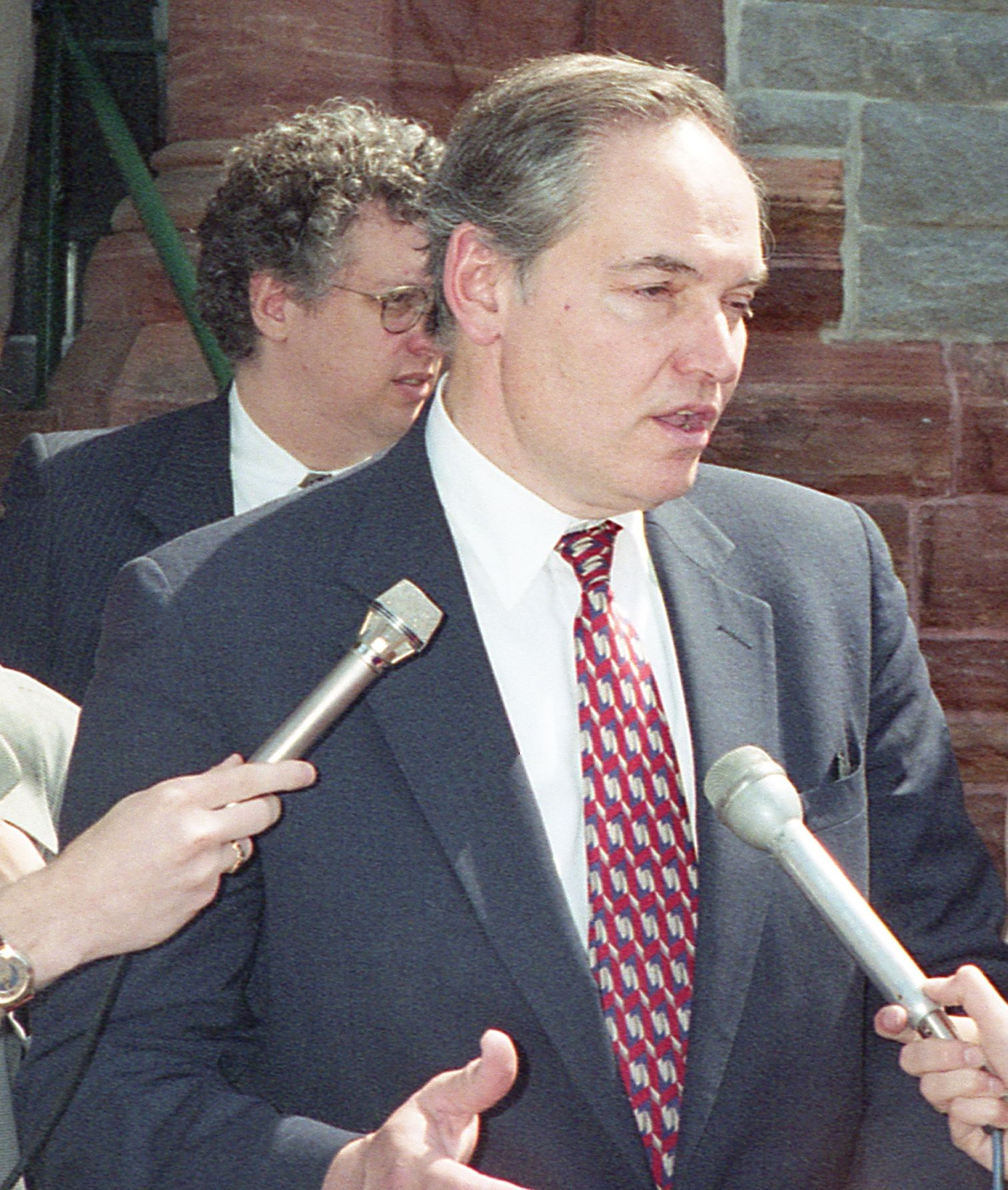

Member of the New York City Council from the 11th district
- In office January 1, 2002 – December 31, 2013
- Preceded by: June Eisland
- Succeeded by: Andrew Cohen
- Constituency: Bronx: Kingsbridge, Riverdale, Woodlawn Heights, Norwood, parts of Bedford Park, Wakefield and Bronx Park East.

61st Attorney General of New York
- In office January 1, 1994 – December 31, 1994
- Governor: Mario Cuomo
- Preceded by: Robert Abrams
- Succeeded by: Dennis Vacco

Member of the New York State Assembly
- In office March 3, 1970 – December 31, 1993
- Preceded by: Benjamin Altman
- Succeeded by: Jeffrey Dinowitz
- Constituency: 84th district (1970–82); 80th district (1983–92); 81st district (1993)

Personal details
- Born: December 15, 1940 (age 85) Manhattan, New York, U.S.
- Party: Democratic
- Spouse: Lorraine Coyle Koppell
- Education: Harvard College; Harvard Law School
- Profession: Lawyer

Gabriel Oliver Koppell (born December 15, 1940) is an American lawyer and politician from New York City. A member of the Democratic Party, he is a former member of the New York City Council and the former New York Attorney General.

== Biography ==
Koppell was born on December 15, 1940, in Manhattan, New York. His parents, refugees from Nazi Germany, moved to Riverdale, Bronx when Oliver was two years old. Koppell attended Bronx elementary schools, the Bronx High School of Science, Harvard College and Harvard Law School, from which he graduated cum laude. While at Harvard College, he founded Let's Go Travel Guides. He is Jewish.

Koppell's first marriage ended in divorce. He is now married to Lorraine Coyle Koppell, an attorney who narrowly lost a race for the New York State Senate in 2000 to Guy Velella. He has three children, all of whom were raised in the Bronx and attended Bronx public schools, and five grandchildren. Koppell is active in the Benjamin Franklin Reform Democratic Club. He has been a resident of Fieldston in the Bronx.

=== New York State Assembly ===
Koppell was a member of the New York State Assembly from 1970 to 1994.

On March 3, 1970, Koppell was elected as an Independent to the New York State Assembly, to fill the vacancy caused by the appointment of Benjamin Altman as New York City Commissioner of Rent and Housing Maintenance. While in the Assembly, he served as Chairman of the Judiciary Committee, and passed the New York bottle bill.

Koppell was re-elected several times as a Democrat, and remained in the Assembly until 1993, sitting in the 178th, 179th, 180th, 181st, 182nd, 183rd, 184th, 185th, 186th, 187th, 188th, 189th and 190th New York State Legislatures

In 1981, Koppell ran for Bronx Borough President, but was defeated in the Democratic primary by the incumbent, Stanley Simon.

=== New York Attorney General ===
On December 16, 1993, Koppell was elected by the New York State Legislature to fill the unexpired term of New York Attorney General Robert Abrams. As attorney general, Koppell successfully brought a lawsuit to allow drivers under the age of 25 to obtain rental cars in the State of New York. Mr. Koppell initiated dozens of public interest lawsuits, collected over $100,000,000 for the state treasury, and negotiated the largest environmental settlement in the history of New York.

In 1994, Koppell sought a full term as attorney general, but lost to Judge Karen Burstein in the Democratic Primary. He finished second, ahead of Brooklyn District Attorney Charles "Joe" Hynes and prosecutor Eliot Spitzer.

In 1998, he again sought the Democratic nomination for attorney general. He finished third in the primary, behind Spitzer, who won, and State Senator Catherine Abate. Koppell finished ahead of Charles Davis, a former staffer for former Governor Mario Cuomo.

=== New York City Council ===
He served as a member of the New York City Council from District 11 in the Bronx, covering the neighborhoods of Riverdale, Kingsbridge, Woodlawn Heights, Van Cortlandt Village, Norwood, and Bedford Park. He was elected to the Council in 2001, and defeated Ari Hoffnung by a 3 to 1 margin in 2005.

On September 15, 2009, Koppell defeated challenger, Tony Perez Casino winning 65% of the vote. Due to term limits, Koppell left the City Council on December 31, 2013.

=== 2014 State Senate Run ===
In 2014, Koppell ran against incumbent State Senator Jeffrey D. Klein in the Democratic Party primary, and was defeated on a 60 to 40 margin. Koppell ran on the basis of disbanding the Independent Democratic Conference (a Democratic group of senators who caucused with Republicans), led by Klein.

== See also ==
- List of Jewish American jurists

New York State Assembly
Preceded by Benjamin Altman	New York State Assembly; 84th District; 1970–1982	Succeeded by Gordon W. Burrows
Preceded by Guy Velella	New York State Assembly; 80th District; 1983–1992	Succeeded by George Friedman
Preceded by Stephen B. Kaufman	New York State Assembly; 81st District; 1993	Succeeded by Jeffrey Dinowitz
Legal offices
Preceded by Robert Abrams	Attorney General of New York; 1994	Succeeded by Dennis Vacco
New York City Council
Preceded by June Eisland	New York City Council; 11th district 2002–2013	Succeeded by Andrew Cohen
