= Public Citizen Litigation Group =

American public interest law firm

Public Citizen Litigation Group is a public interest law firm in the United States. The group is the litigation arm of the non-profit consumer advocacy organization Public Citizen. Its attorneys work on cases involving health and safety regulation, consumer rights, separation of powers, access to the courts, class actions, open government, and the First Amendment.

At the Supreme Court, the Litigation Group handles its own cases and provides pro bono assistance to lawyers on issues concerning access to courts, health and safety, and other topics in the public interest. In a 2008 study, law professor Richard Lazarus noted that the Litigation Group "has long provided high-quality assistance in the preparation of briefs and presentation of oral argument to public interest advocates with cases before the [Supreme] Court."

From its founding, the Litigation Group has devoted a significant portion of its efforts to fighting government secrecy. It has litigated more FOIA cases than any other organization. The Litigation Group has secured from government files information about health risks, safety issues, and financial problems, on behalf of other divisions within Public Citizen, other public interest organizations, reporters, and academics. Among material of significant public interest obtained through its efforts are approximately 2,000 pages of Lt. Col. Oliver North's notebooks (National Security Archive v. National Archives and Records Administration).

Litigation Group lawyers have also litigated issues surrounding preservation of and access to electronic records. In the case Armstrong v. Executive Office of the President, Litigation Group lawyers succeeded in establishing that electronic records generated by the White House and the rest of the Executive Branch are subject to federal open records laws. At the end of both the Reagan administration and the first Bush administration, the government had claimed that it was entitled to delete all of the electronic records created and stored by the White House during each president's tenure. As a result of the litigation, in which the court agreed that FOIA required that executive branch email be preserved, the government released more than 3,000 email records from the White House and the National Security Council.

The Litigation Group brings many cases under the Administrative Procedure Act to challenge agency regulations or other actions that it deems arbitrary and capricious or unlawful. For example, in 2004, the Litigation Group along with Citizens for Reliable and Safe Highways (CRASH), and Parents Against Tired Truckers (PATT) successfully challenged the final rule governing the hours of service of commercial truck drivers, issued by the Federal Motor Carrier Safety Administration. The advocacy groups claimed that the rule expanded the hours that truckers may legally drive, failed to mandate the use of electronic onboard recording devices to put an end to the pervasive violations of legal limits, and would likely lead to many avoidable deaths and injuries on the nation's highways.

In 2002, when the National Highway Traffic Safety Administration (NHTSA) issued a rule to implement a law that required a device in new vehicles to warn drivers when a tire was significantly underinflated, but the rule allowed use of devices that would not warn when two or more tires were underinflated, the Litigation Group successfully sued to force NHTSA to issue a rule that complied with this important safety measure (Public Citizen v. Mineta).

In 2001, after nine years of delay, the Occupational Safety and Health Administration (OSHA) had not issued a rule to regulate use of the highly toxic chemical hexavalent chromium, the Litigation Group successfully brought suit to force OSHA to issue a rule (Public Citizen v. OSHA).

Cases have involved the right to speak and read anonymously on internet message boards; the use of brand names in web site domain names, metatags and keyword advertising; the right to maintain interactive discussions; and file-sharing. They have also defended the rights of small online merchants targeted by large corporations that claim selling less expensive second-hand or competing products infringes the company's intellectual property rights.

The group has gained prominence for its role in a variety of cases challenging some of the initial actions of the second Trump administration. This has included the American Foreign Service Association v. Trump; Alliance for Retired Americans, AFGE, & SEIU v. Bessent; University of California Students Association v. Carter; Doctors for America v. Office of Personnel Management et al.; and Public Citizen, SDDF, & AFGE v. Trump.
