= Jeffrey Dinowitz =

American politician (born 1954)

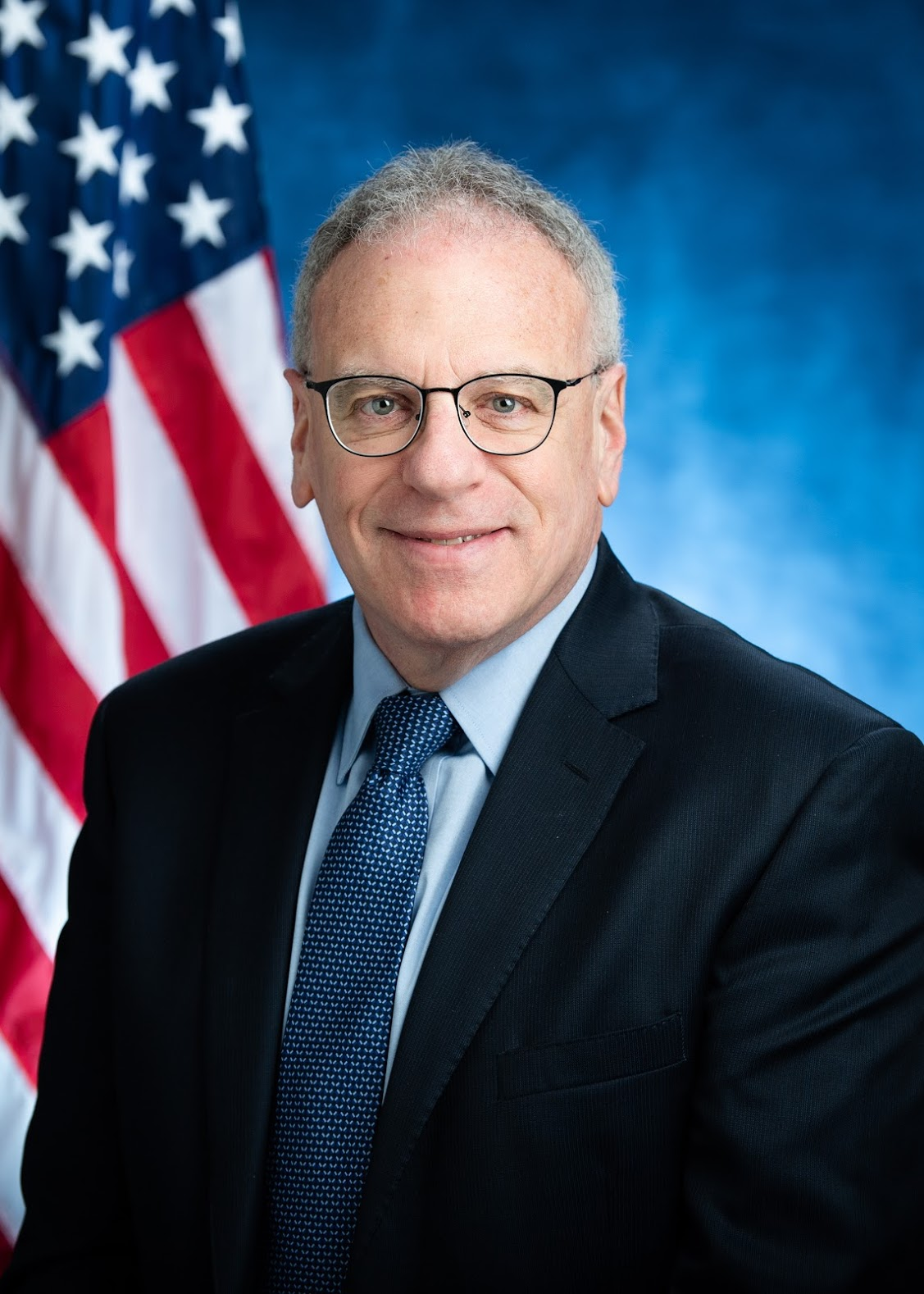

Member of the New York State Assembly from the 81st district
- Incumbent
- Assumed office February 28, 1994
- Preceded by: Oliver Koppell

Personal details
- Born: December 3, 1954 (age 71) New York City, New York, U.S.
- Party: Democratic
- Children: 2, including Eric
- Education: City University of New York, Lehman (BA); Brooklyn Law School (JD)
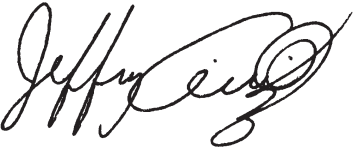
- Signature
- Website: Campaign website State Assembly website

Jeffrey Dinowitz (born December 3, 1954) is an American politician who represents District 81 in the New York State Assembly, which comprises Kingsbridge, Marble Hill, Norwood, Riverdale, Van Cortlandt Village, Wakefield, and Woodlawn Heights. He has served in the New York State Assembly since 1994.

== Early life, education, and family ==
Dinowitz was born and raised in the Bronx. He is a graduate of the Bronx High School of Science, Lehman College of the City University of New York, and Brooklyn Law School.

Dinowitz first entered politics as a volunteer on the George McGovern 1972 presidential campaign. He was also involved in community issues such as tenant advocacy and volunteering on the board of Bronx Council for Environmental Quality during the 1970s.

Prior to entering the New York State Assembly, Dinowitz served for a decade as an administrative law judge for New York.

Dinowitz and his wife Sylvia Gottlieb have been married since 1978 and now live in the Riverdale neighborhood of the Bronx. They have two children: Kara and Eric, and four grandchildren.

== Career ==
=== New York State Assembly ===
Dinowitz was first elected in a special election held in 1994 to replace Oliver Koppell. Dinowitz serves as chair of the New York State Assembly Committee on Codes, as well as of the Bronx delegation. He is also a member of the Puerto Rican/Hispanic Task Force and the committees on Ways and Means, Rules, Health, and Election Law.

Previously, Dinowitz served as chair of the Assembly Committee on Judiciary from 2018 to 2020. In 2017, Dinowitz served as chair of the Assembly Committee on Corporations, Authorities, and Commissions, which has oversight of the MTA and public utilities, among other entities. Before that, Dinowitz served as chair of the committees on Consumer Affairs and Protection, Aging, and Alcoholism and Drug Abuse.

Dinowitz was a key figure in the 2008 "Rainbow Rebellion" that united several factions of the Bronx Democratic Party in order to overthrow party chair Jose Rivera, who had been accused of nepotism and patronage in his time as county leader. Dinowitz joined with then-Assemblyman Rubén Diaz Jr., Assemblyman Carl Heastie, Assemblyman Michael Benedetto, then-Assemblywoman Aurelia Greene, and others to oust Rivera.

=== Legislation ===
In 2016, Dinowitz passed legislation to enter New York State into the National Popular Vote Interstate Compact, and to enact protections against human trafficking.

In 2019, Dinowitz passed legislation that eliminated all non-medical exemptions to school vaccine requirements.

In 2020, Dinowitz passed legislation intended to protect tenants and homeowners, including the Tenant Safe Harbor Act and the Emergency Eviction & Foreclosure Prevention Act. Also in 2020, Dinowitz passed legislation to expedite court-ordered apartment repairs in honor of a child who was killed in an apartment fire while the landlord fought in court to avoid making repairs. Also in 2020, Dinowitz passed legislation to allow absentee voting through 2021 in response to the COVID-19 pandemic.

=== Other political roles ===
Dinowitz served as Democratic District Leader from 1986 to 1994. He also served as a Democratic State Committeeman in 1978, and has served as a delegate to the Democratic National Convention on multiple occasions. Dinowitz was first selected as a DNC delegate in 1980 as one of the youngest delegates, and was originally committed to the slate for senator Ted Kennedy, who was challenging incumbent president Jimmy Carter.

Dinowitz is a former chair of the Bronx Democratic County Committee.

Dinowitz was a vociferous opponent of the Croton Water Filtration Plant due to the required transfer of 23 acres from Van Cortlandt Park and the expenditure of $3.2 billion.
