= M. J. Simpson =

British writer

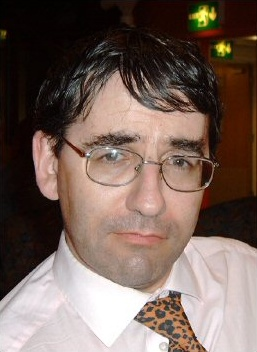
- Simpson in 2005
- Born: Mike Simpson
- Occupations: Author; journalist; critic; scriptwriter
- Writing career
- Genres: Biography; film criticism

Mike Simpson, professionally known as M.J. Simpson, is a British author, journalist, critic, scriptwriter and occasional actor. He was deputy editor of the British science fiction magazine SFX from 1995 to 1998. He was for several years an expert on the television writer and novelist Douglas Adams and his work.

Simpson wrote two books about Adams' The Hitchhiker's Guide to the Galaxy and was involved in running ZZ9 Plural Z Alpha, the official Hitchhiker's Guide appreciation society. In 2005, on the release of the Hitchhiker's film adaptation, Simpson closed down his website Planet Magrathea and gave up writing about the subject.

Simpson is an authority on modern British horror films, a subject on which he has so far written multiple books as well as a regular column, "21st Century Frights", in Scream magazine.

Simpson's website about "cult movies and the people who make them" has been running continually since January 2002, initially at www.mjsimpson.co.uk (now defunct) and, since 2013, on Blogger.

In 2024, he appeared as a contestant on The 1% Club and reached the 1% question.

== Bibliography ==
- The Pocket Essential Hitchhiker's Guide
- Hitchhiker: A Biography of Douglas Adams (2003)
- Urban Terrors: New British Horror Cinema 1997–2008 (2012)
