= Karen Burstein =

American politician

Karen S. Burstein (born July 20, 1942) is an American Democratic Party politician, attorney, civil servant, and former judge from the State of New York. She served in the New York State Senate, worked in the administration of Gov. Mario Cuomo, chaired the New York State Civil Service Commission, became Auditor General of New York City, and then served as a Judge of the New York City Family Court. Burstein was the Democratic nominee for Attorney General of New York in 1994, but was defeated.

== Early life and education ==
Burstein was born on July 20, 1942 in Nassau County, New York, the daughter of international lawyer Herbert Burstein and New York State Supreme Court Justice Beatrice S. Burstein (1915–2001). Burstein's mother was the first woman State Supreme Court Justice on Long Island. Burstein grew up in Baldwin, New York and Lawrence, New York. She was the first female student body president at the Woodmere Academy. A 1964 graduate of Bryn Mawr College, Burstein also was the first white full-time student at Fisk University. She graduated from Fordham Law School in 1971.

== Career ==
Burstein taught in newly integrated Tennessee high schools and protested the Vietnam War. She has also worked as a legal services attorney.

A Democrat, Burstein unsuccessfully ran for Congress on Long Island in 1970 on an antiwar platform.

Burstein was elected to the New York State Senate in 1972. She represented a low-income section of southeast Queens as well as the wealthy Five Towns region of Long Island. As a senator, Burstein "helped negotiate major legislation on domestic violence, which has been a continuing concern of hers". She is considered to be a progressive.

Burstein was named chairwoman of the New York State Consumer Protection Board in 1980. In 1983, she was appointed president of the New York State Civil Service Commission. In 1987, Burstein was appointed Auditor General of New York City by New York City Mayor Ed Koch. New York City Mayor David Dinkins appointed Burstein to a judgeship on the New York City Family Court in 1990.

Burstein resigned her Family Court judgeship in 1994 to seek the Democratic nomination for New York Attorney General. In the primary, she faced Attorney General G. Oliver Koppell, Brooklyn D.A. Charles Hynes, and former prosecutor Eliot Spitzer. She won the primary and faced former U.S. Attorney Dennis Vacco of Buffalo in the general election. A week before the election, Staten Island Borough President Guy Molinari opined that Burstein would not be qualified to serve as Attorney General because she is a lesbian. Vacco narrowly defeated Burstein. The New York Times called Molinari's remarks "gutter politics."

Burstein unsuccessfully sought a New York County Surrogate's Court judgeship in 1996.

== Personal life ==
Burstein married Eric Lane in 1972. The couple later divorced. In 1990, during a judicial swearing-in ceremony, Burstein publicly acknowledged her female romantic partner. As of 1994, Burstein publicly identified as a lesbian.

Burstein is Jewish.

Burstein is the sister of John Burstein, who portrays the fictional character Slim Goodbody.

Burstein's sister, Ellen, was a television news reporter who died at the age of 59 after suffering from multiple sclerosis.

== See also ==
- List of LGBT jurists in the United States

New York State Senate
Preceded by Jack E. Bronston	New York State Senate; 9th District; 1973–1978	Succeeded by Carol Berman
Party political offices
Preceded by Robert Abrams	Democratic nominee for Attorney General of New York; 1994	Succeeded by Eliot Spitzer
