= New York's 81st State Assembly district =

American legislative district

Assemblymember
Jeffrey Dinowitz; D–Riverdale

New York's 81st State Assembly district is one of the 150 districts in the New York State Assembly. It has been represented by Jeffrey Dinowitz since 1994.

== Geography ==
District 81 is in The Bronx. It comprises the neighborhoods of Kingsbridge, Marble Hill, Norwood, Riverdale, Van Cortlandt Village, Wakefield, and Woodlawn Heights.

== Recent election results ==
=== 2026 ===
2026 New York State Assembly election, District 81
Primary election
Party	Candidate	Votes	%
Democratic	Jeffrey Dinowitz (incumbent)	7,791	64.7
Democratic	Morgan Evers	4,225	35.1
Write-in		29	0.2
Total votes		12,045	100.0
General election
Democratic	Jeffrey Dinowitz (incumbent)		
Write-in			
Total votes			100.0

=== 2024 ===
2024 New York State Assembly election, District 81
Party	Candidate	Votes	%
Democratic	Jeffrey Dinowitz (incumbent)	29,907	76.4
Republican	Kevin Pazmino	7,941	
Conservative	Kevin Pazmino	1,003	
Total	Kevin Pazmino	8,944	22.8
Write-in		298	0.8
Total votes		39,149	100.0
Democratic hold			

=== 2022 ===
2022 New York State Assembly election, District 81
Primary election
Party	Candidate	Votes	%
Democratic	Jeffrey Dinowitz (incumbent)	6,311	62.3
Democratic	Jessica Woolford	3,797	37.5
Write-in		28	0.2
Total votes		10,136	100.0
General election
Democratic	Jeffrey Dinowitz (incumbent)	18,750	75.6
Working Families	Jessica Woolford	3,518	14.2
Conservative	Alan Reed	2,516	10.1
Write-in		24	0.1
Total votes		24,808	100.0
Democratic hold			

=== 2020 ===
2020 New York State Assembly election, District 81
Primary election
Party	Candidate	Votes	%
Democratic	Jeffrey Dinowitz (incumbent)	10,325	63.5
Democratic	George Diaz	5,889	36.2
Write-in		49	0.3
Total votes		16,263	100.0
General election
Democratic	Jeffrey Dinowitz (incumbent)	37,818	80.9
Republican	Nicole Torres	7,443	15.9
Conservative	Alan Reed	1,395	3.0
Write-in		118	0.2
Total votes		46,774	100.0
Democratic hold			

=== 2018 ===
2018 New York State Assembly election, District 81
Party	Candidate	Votes	%
Democratic	Jeffrey Dinowitz	27,986	
Working Families	Jeffrey Dinowitz	1,462	
Women's Equality	Jeffrey Dinowitz	309	
Total	Jeffrey Dinowitz (incumbent)	29,757	87.4
Republican	Alan Reed	3,636	
Conservative	Alan Reed	573	
Total	Alan Reed	4,209	12.4
Write-in		73	0.2
Total votes		34,039	100
Democratic hold			

=== 2016 ===
2016 New York State Assembly election, District 81
Party	Candidate	Votes	%
Democratic	Jeffrey Dinowitz	31,326	
Working Families	Jeffrey Dinowitz	1,586	
Women's Equality	Jeffrey Dinowitz	519	
Total	Jeffrey Dinowitz (incumbent)	33,431	91.5
Conservative	Alan Reed	3,010	8.3
Write-in		84	0.2
Total votes		36,525	100
Democratic hold			

=== 2014 ===
2014 New York State Assembly election, District 81
Party	Candidate	Votes	%
Democratic	Jeffrey Dinowitz	13,713	
Working Families	Jeffrey Dinowitz	1,672	
Total	Jeffrey Dinowitz (incumbent)	15,385	90.6
Conservative	Alan Reed	1,543	9.1
Write-in		54	0.3
Total votes		16,982	100
Democratic hold			

=== 2012 ===
2012 New York State Assembly election, District 81
Party	Candidate	Votes	%
Democratic	Jeffrey Dinowitz	30,886	
Working Families	Jeffrey Dinowitz	1,364	
Total	Jeffrey Dinowitz (incumbent)	32,250	92.9
Conservative	Judith Kunz	2,434	7.0
Write-in		37	0.1
Total votes		34,721	100
Democratic hold			

=== 2010 ===
2010 New York State Assembly election, District 81
Party	Candidate	Votes	%
Democratic	Jeffrey Dinowitz	15,261	
Working Families	Jeffrey Dinowitz	1,399	
Total	Jeffrey Dinowitz (incumbent)	16,660	77.1
Republican	Joseph McLaughlin	4,237	
Conservative	Joseph McLaughlin	678	
Total	Joseph McLaughlin	4,915	22.8
Write-in		21	0.1
Total votes		21,596	100
Democratic hold			

=== 2008 ===
2008 New York State Assembly election, District 81
Party	Candidate	Votes	%
Democratic	Jeffrey Dinowitz	27,440	
Working Families	Jeffrey Dinowitz	1,262	
Total	Jeffrey Dinowitz (incumbent)	28,702	95.8
Conservative	Jeffrey Klapper	1,271	4.2
Write-in		2	0.0
Total votes		29,975	100
Democratic hold			
