= New York City's 11th City Council district =

- Boundaries following the 2020 census

Government
  - Councilmember: Eric Dinowitz (D—Riverdale)

Population (2010)
  - Total: 162,922

Demographics
  - Hispanic: 39%
  - White: 33%
  - Black: 19%
  - Asian: 7%
  - Other: 3%

Registration
  - Democratic: 70.6%
  - Republican: 8.0%
  - No party preference: 18.1%
- Registered voters (2021) 102,617

New York City's 11th City Council district is one of 51 districts in the New York City Council. It has been represented by Democrat Eric Dinowitz since a 2021 special election to succeed fellow Democrat Andrew Cohen.

== Geography ==
District 11 is based in the far northwest corner of the Bronx, covering all of Riverdale, Norwood, Van Cortlandt Village, and Woodlawn, and parts of Wakefield, Bedford Park, and Kingsbridge. Van Cortlandt Park, the city's third-largest park, is located within the district.

The district overlaps with Bronx Community Boards 7, 8, and 12, and with New York's 13th and 16th congressional districts. It also overlaps with the 33rd and 36th districts of the New York State Senate, and with the 78th, 80th, 81st, and 83rd districts of the New York State Assembly.

== Recent election results ==
=== 2025 ===
2025 New York City Council election, District 11
Primary election
Party	Candidate	Votes	%
Democratic	Eric Dinowitz (incumbent)	13,973	71.4
Democratic	Danielle Herbert-Guggenheim	5,477	28.0
Write-in		118	0.6
Total votes		19,568	100.0
General election
Democratic	Eric Dinowitz (incumbent)	30,195	82.2
Republican	Stylo Sapaskis	4,756	13.0
Conservative	Denise Smith	1,462	4.0
Write-in		295	0.8
Total votes		36,708	100.0
Democratic hold			

=== 2023 (redistricting) ===
Due to redistricting and the 2020 changes to the New York City Charter, councilmembers elected during the 2021 and 2023 City Council elections will serve two-year terms, with full four-year terms resuming after the 2025 New York City Council elections.

2023 New York City Council election, District 11
Party	Candidate	Votes	%
Democratic	Eric Dinowitz (incumbent)	9,594	83.7
Republican	Robert Caemmerer	1,335	
Conservative	Robert Caemmerer	307	
Total	Robert Caemmerer	1,642	14.3
Write-in		223	2.0
Total votes		11,459	100.0
Democratic hold			

=== 2021 ===
In 2019, voters in New York City approved Ballot Question 1, which implemented ranked-choice voting in all local elections. Under the new system, voters have the option to rank up to five candidates for every local office. Voters whose first-choice candidates fare poorly will have their votes redistributed to other candidates in their ranking until one candidate surpasses the 50 percent threshold. If one candidate surpasses 50 percent in first-choice votes, then ranked-choice tabulations will not occur.

2021 New York City Council election, District 11 Democratic primary
Party	Candidate	Maximum round	Maximum votes	Share in maximum round	Maximum votes First round votes Transfer votes
Democratic	Eric Dinowitz (incumbent)	6	9,491	61.3%	
Democratic	Mino Lora	6	5,994	38.7%	
Democratic	Abigail Martin	5	3,005	18.4%	
Democratic	Dan Padernacht	3	1,102	6.6%	
Democratic	Jessica Haller	3	1,059	6.3%	
Democratic	Marcos Sierra	2	356	2.1%	
Democratic	Carlton Berkley	2	314	1.8%	
Write-in		1	36	0.2%	

An interactive map of District 11

2021 New York City Council election, District 11 general election
Party	Candidate	Votes	%
Democratic	Eric Dinowitz (incumbent)	15,416	80.3
Republican	Kevin Pazmino	2,983	
Conservative	Kevin Pazmino	574	
Total	Kevin Pazmino	3,557	18.5
Write-in		213	1.2
Total votes		19,186	100
Democratic hold			

=== 2021 special ===
In December 2020, Councilmember Andrew Cohen resigned from his seat in order to assume his new position as a justice of the Bronx Supreme Court, triggering a special election. The election, which was won by Eric Dinowitz, was among the first in the city to use ranked-choice voting. Like all municipal special elections in New York City, the race was officially nonpartisan, with all candidates running on ballot lines of their own creation.

2021 New York City Council special election, District 11
Party	Candidate	Maximum round	Maximum votes	Share in maximum round	Maximum votes First round votes Transfer votes
Nonpartisan	Eric Dinowitz	6	5,579	63.6%	
Nonpartisan	Mino Lora	6	3,188	36.4%	
Nonpartisan	Jessica Haller	5	1,682	18.7%	
Nonpartisan	Dan Padernacht	4	1,204	12.9%	
Nonpartisan	Kevin Pazmino	3	200	2.1%	
Nonpartisan	Carlton Berkley	2	172	1.8%	
Write-in		1	24	0.3%	

=== 2017 ===
2017 New York City Council election, District 11
Party	Candidate	Votes	%
Democratic	Andrew Cohen	16,783	
Working Families	Andrew Cohen	1,477	
Total	Andrew Cohen (incumbent)	18,260	84.6
Republican	Judah Powers	2,321	
Conservative	Judah Powers	594	
Total	Judah Powers	2,915	13.5
Animal Rights	Roxanne Delgado	337	1.6
Write-in		61	0.3
Total votes		21,573	100
Democratic hold			

=== 2013 ===
2013 New York City Council election, District 11
Primary election
Party	Candidate	Votes	%
Democratic	Andrew Cohen	8,039	68.4
Democratic	Clifford Stanton	3,711	31.6
Write-in		1	0.0
Total votes		11,751	100
General election
Democratic	Andrew Cohen	14,715	
Working Families	Andrew Cohen	949	
Total	Andrew Cohen	15,664	79.6
Republican	Patricia Brink	2,379	12.1
School Choice	Cheryl Keeling	552	2.8
Conservative	William Kalaidjian	542	2.8
Green	John Reynolds	508	2.6
Write-in		22	0.1
Total votes		19,667	100
Democratic hold			
