= Evan A. Davis =

American lawyer

- Born: Evan Anderson Davis; Greenwich, Connecticut, U.S.
- Education: Harvard University (AB); Columbia University (JD)
- Occupation: Lawyer

Evan Anderson Davis is a New York City attorney with the law firm Cleary Gottlieb Steen & Hamilton, and a former president of the New York City Bar Association.

== Education ==
Davis was raised in Greenwich, Connecticut and educated at Phillips Exeter Academy, class of 1962. He obtained his A.B. from Harvard College in 1966, and his Juris Doctor, magna cum laude, from Columbia Law School in 1969. While at Columbia, he was Editor-in-Chief of the Columbia Law Review. After graduation, he clerked for Judge Harold Leventhal of the United States Court of Appeals for the District of Columbia, and subsequently for Justice Potter Stewart of the United States Supreme Court.

== Career ==
In 1974, Davis worked on the U.S. House Judiciary Committee impeachment inquiry staff during the impeachment process against Richard Nixon. He led a task force that investigated the Watergate break-in and cover-up.

Davis joined Cleary Gottlieb in 1975 and became a partner in 1978, working in litigation and international and domestic dispute resolution. From 1985 to 1991, he served as counsel to New York State Governor Mario Cuomo. He rejoined the firm in 1991.

In 2017 to 2018, he advocated for a Constitutional Convention in New York state.

== Civic involvement and awards ==
In addition to his service under Mario Cuomo, Davis was a candidate for New York State Attorney General in 1998. From 2000 to 2002 he served as president of the New York City Bar Association. In 2008, he was recommended for appointment as the Chief Judge of the New York Court of Appeals by the state Commission on Judicial Nomination.

== Personal life ==
In 1995, he married Mary Carroll Rothwell, also an attorney, in New York City. They have three daughters.

== See also ==
- List of law clerks for the eighth seat of the Supreme Court of the United States

== Selected publications ==
- Davis, Evan A. (June 2003). "The Meaning of Professional Independence". Columbia Law Review. 103 (5): 1281–1292. doi:10.2307/1123837. JSTOR 1123837.
