= Eliot Spitzer =

Governor of New York from 2007 to 2008

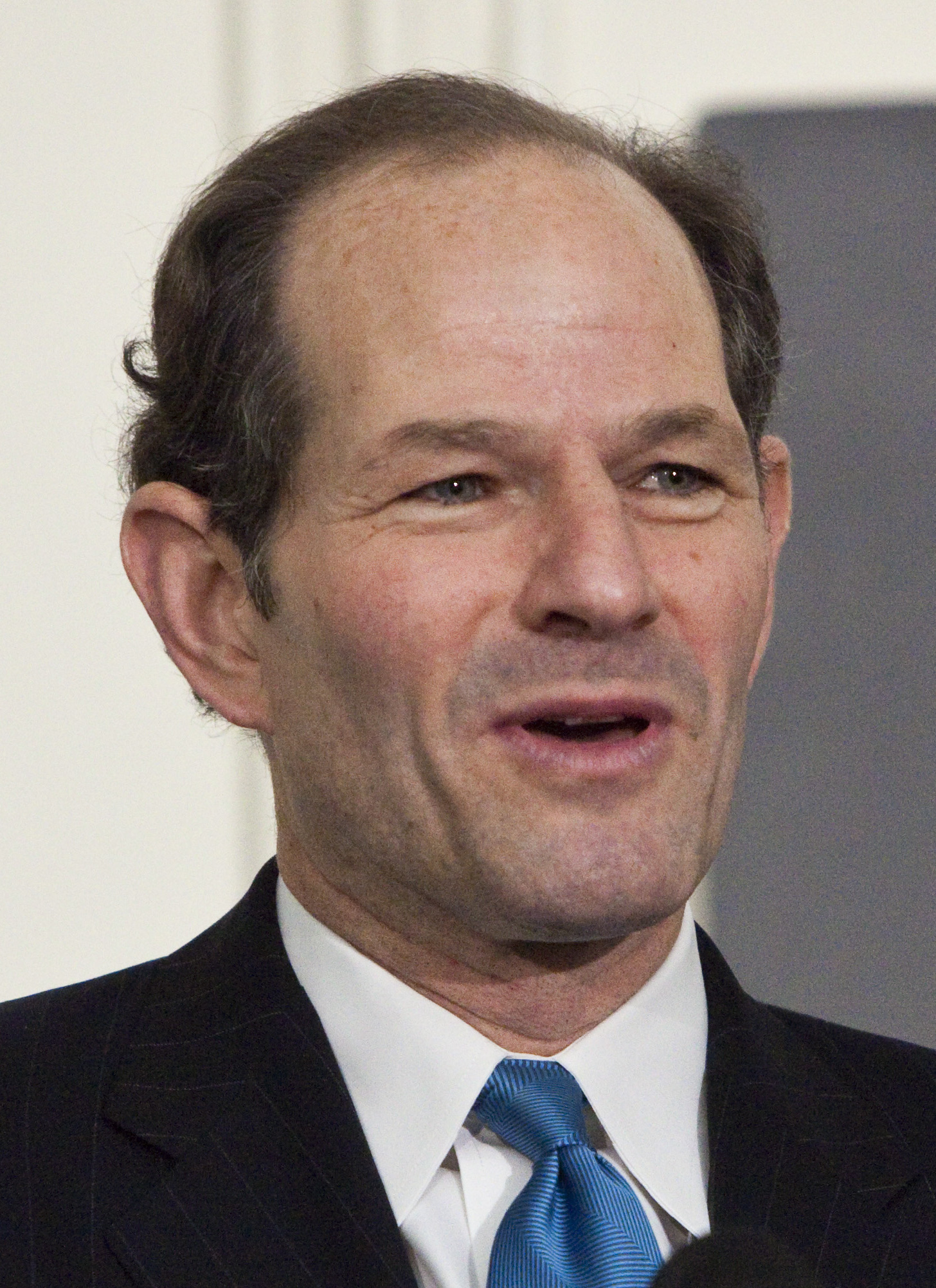
- Spitzer in 2009

54th Governor of New York
- In office January 1, 2007 – March 17, 2008
- Lieutenant: David Paterson
- Preceded by: George Pataki
- Succeeded by: David Paterson

63rd Attorney General of New York
- In office January 1, 1999 – December 31, 2006
- Governor: George Pataki
- Preceded by: Dennis Vacco
- Succeeded by: Andrew Cuomo

Personal details
- Born: Eliot Laurence Spitzer; June 10, 1959 (age 67) New York City, New York, U.S.
- Party: Democratic
- Spouse(s): Silda Wall (m. 1987; div. 2013) Roxana Girand-Spitzer (m. 2020)
- Children: 3
- Parent: Bernard Spitzer (father)
- Education: Princeton University (BA); Harvard University (JD)

Eliot Laurence Spitzer (born June 10, 1959) is an American politician and attorney who served as the 54th governor of New York from 2007 until his resignation in 2008. A member of the Democratic Party, he was also the 63rd attorney general of New York from 1999 to 2006.

Born in the Bronx, Spitzer attended Princeton University and earned his Juris Doctor degree from Harvard Law School. He began his career as an attorney in private practice with New York law firms before becoming a prosecutor with the office of the New York County (Manhattan) District Attorney. Spitzer defeated Republican incumbent Dennis Vacco in 1998 to become state attorney general, earning a reputation as the "Sheriff of Wall Street" for his efforts to curb corruption in the financial services industry. He was elected governor of New York in 2006 by the largest margin of any candidate in New York state history, but his tenure lasted less than two years after it was uncovered he patronized a prostitution ring. He resigned immediately following the scandal, with the remainder of his term served by David Paterson, his lieutenant governor.

Since leaving the governorship, Spitzer has worked as a television host and an adjunct instructor at City College of New York, along with engaging in real estate activity and making private investments in a start-up company. He also ran for New York City Comptroller in 2013, losing the Democratic nomination to the eventual winner, Scott Stringer.

== Early life and education ==
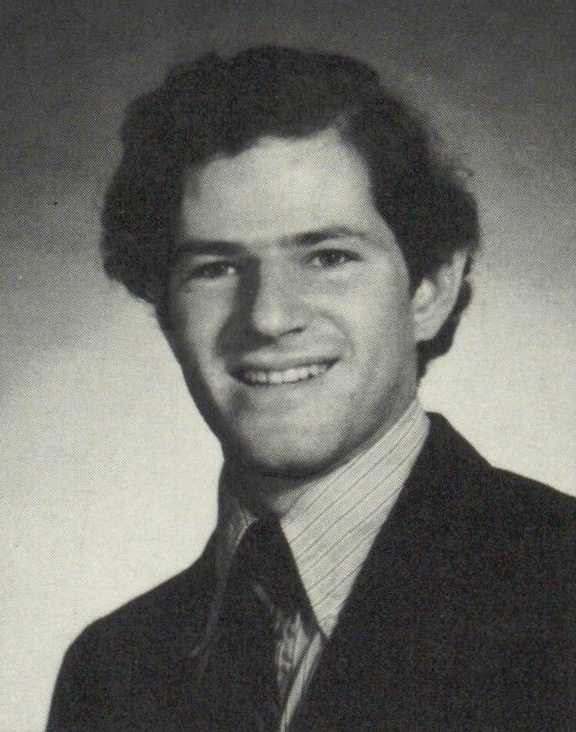
Spitzer in the Princeton University yearbook, 1981

Eliot Laurence Spitzer was born in 1959 in the Bronx, New York City, the son of Anne (née Goldhaber), an English literature professor, and Bernard Spitzer, a real estate mogul. His paternal grandparents were Galician Jews, born in Tluste, Poland, now Ukraine. His maternal grandparents, born in the 1890s, were Jewish emigrants from Ottoman-era Palestine (now Israel). Spitzer is the youngest of three children. He was raised in the affluent Riverdale section of the Bronx. His family was not religious, and Spitzer did not have a bar mitzvah.

He is a 1977 graduate of Horace Mann School. After scoring 1590 out of 1600 on the Scholastic Aptitude Test (SAT), he attended Princeton University and graduated with a B.A. from the Woodrow Wilson School of Public and International Affairs in 1981, completing a 151-page-long senior thesis titled "Revolutions in Post-Stalin Eastern Europe: A Study of Soviet Reactions". At Princeton, he was elected chairman of the undergraduate student government and graduated in 1981. He then received his Juris Doctor at Harvard Law School. He has said he received a perfect score on the Law School Admission Test (LSAT). During law school, he met Silda Wall, whom he would go on to marry in 1987. Spitzer was an editor of the Harvard Law Review.

== Legal career ==
Upon completion of law school, Spitzer clerked for Judge Robert W. Sweet of the U.S. District Court for the Southern District of New York, then joined the law firm of Paul, Weiss, Rifkind, Wharton & Garrison. He stayed there for less than two years before leaving to join the New York County District Attorney's office.

Spitzer joined the staff of Manhattan District Attorney Robert Morgenthau, where he became chief of the labor-racketeering unit and spent six years (1986–1992) pursuing organized crime. Spitzer's biggest case came in 1992, when he led the investigation that ended the Gambino crime family's organized crime control of Manhattan's trucking and garment industries. Spitzer devised a plan to set up his own sweatshop in the city's garment district, where he turned out shirts, pants and sweaters, and hired 30 laborers. The shop manager eventually got close to the Gambinos, and officials were able to plant a bug in their office. The Gambinos, rather than being charged with extortion—which was hard to prove—were charged with antitrust violations. Joseph and Thomas Gambino, the latter being an extremely high-ranking member, and two other defendants took the deal and avoided jail by pleading guilty, paying $12 million in fines and agreeing to stay out of the business.

Spitzer left the District Attorney's office in 1992 to work at the law firm of Skadden, Arps, Slate, Meagher & Flom. From 1994 to 1998 he worked at the law firm Constantine and Partners on a number of consumer rights and antitrust cases.

== New York State Attorney General ==
=== Campaigns ===
==== 1994 campaign ====
Spitzer ran as a Democratic candidate in the 1994 election for Attorney General, as did Attorney General Oliver Koppell, Brooklyn Family Court Judge Karen Burstein, and Kings County DA Charles J. Hynes. At the time, Spitzer was a young and relatively unknown defense attorney representing white-collar criminals. When he announced his campaign Spitzer suggested that, if elected, he would use the state's antitrust laws to pursue corporate polluters. Spitzer was the only candidate to support the death penalty. In a televised debate among the candidates, Spitzer was criticized for financing his campaign using $3 million of his own and family money. Despite heavy funding from his own family, he placed last among the four Democratic candidates for the nomination, receiving just 19% of the vote. Burstein, the only woman and gay candidate, won the primary with 31% of vote. Burstein subsequently lost the general election to Republican Dennis Vacco.

==== 1998 campaign ====
Four years later, Spitzer again wanted to run for Attorney General and on May 6, 1998, he announced he would run for the office for a second time. On May 28, he emerged as the front-runner among the Democratic candidates, ranking first at the Democratic convention with 36% of the vote. He also had the most money, with over $2 million. In September, he won the Democratic primary election with 42% of the vote. He defeated State Senator Catherine Abate (27%), Koppell (22%), and former Governor's Counsel Evan Davis (9%).

In late October 1998, Spitzer conceded that his father had lent him most of the campaign money he raised. According to The New York Times, after "repeatedly contending that he alone paid his campaign bills this year and in 1994, [Spitzer] acknowledged [that] his father, a wealthy real estate developer, [played] an extensive role in helping to finance his campaigns." He financed the campaigns from two sets of loans—both from J.P. Morgan & Company—that amounted to $4.3 million in 1994 and $4.8 million in 1998. Spitzer said, "I have worked long, long hours for my dad and for various businesses. Look, I'm not saying that I am underpaid. But any effort to challenge the propriety of that fee is way off base."

On October 28, The New York Times endorsed Spitzer, opining that both candidates were flawed but adding that "Vacco's performance and his key policy positions make him an even worse choice [than Spitzer]". In November, Spitzer went on to defeat Republican incumbent Dennis Vacco by a small margin of victory of 0.6%. Spitzer did not win a single county in Upstate New York and won a total of six counties statewide (New York (81%), Bronx (80%), Kings (75%), Queens (67%), Westchester (52%), and Rockland (48%)).

==== 2002 reelection campaign ====
In 2002 Spitzer ran for re-election and a second term as New York's Attorney General. Spitzer defeated Republican Judge Dora Irizarry 66–30%.

=== Tenure overview ===
As Attorney General, Spitzer stepped up the profile of the office. Traditionally, state attorneys general have pursued consumer rights cases, concentrating on local fraud while deferring national issues to the federal government. Breaking with this traditional deference, Spitzer took up civil actions and criminal prosecutions relating to corporate white-collar crime, securities fraud, Internet fraud, and environmental protection.

During his term in office, Spitzer also commissioned a 1999 study of the NYPD's stop-and-frisk practices.

In 2004, The Nation endorsed Spitzer as a possible Democratic candidate for vice president, stating that he was "the single most effective battler against corporate abuses in either political party". He was, however, not chosen.

During Spitzer's tenure, future Manhattan District Attorney Alvin Bragg was hired as an Assistant Attorney General.

=== Loan investigation controversy ===
The New York State Senate Investigations committee considered investigating a controversial multi-million-dollar loan his father Bernard Spitzer gave him when he ran for attorney general in 1998, a loan the younger Spitzer paid back. Senate Investigations Committee chairman George Winner told the New York Post that subpoenas should be used to find out about the loans. In 1998, Spitzer claimed that he secured the $5 million loan by mortgaging apartments his father had given him, but later revealed that his father was paying off the loans and, therefore, financing his campaign.

== 2006 gubernatorial campaign ==
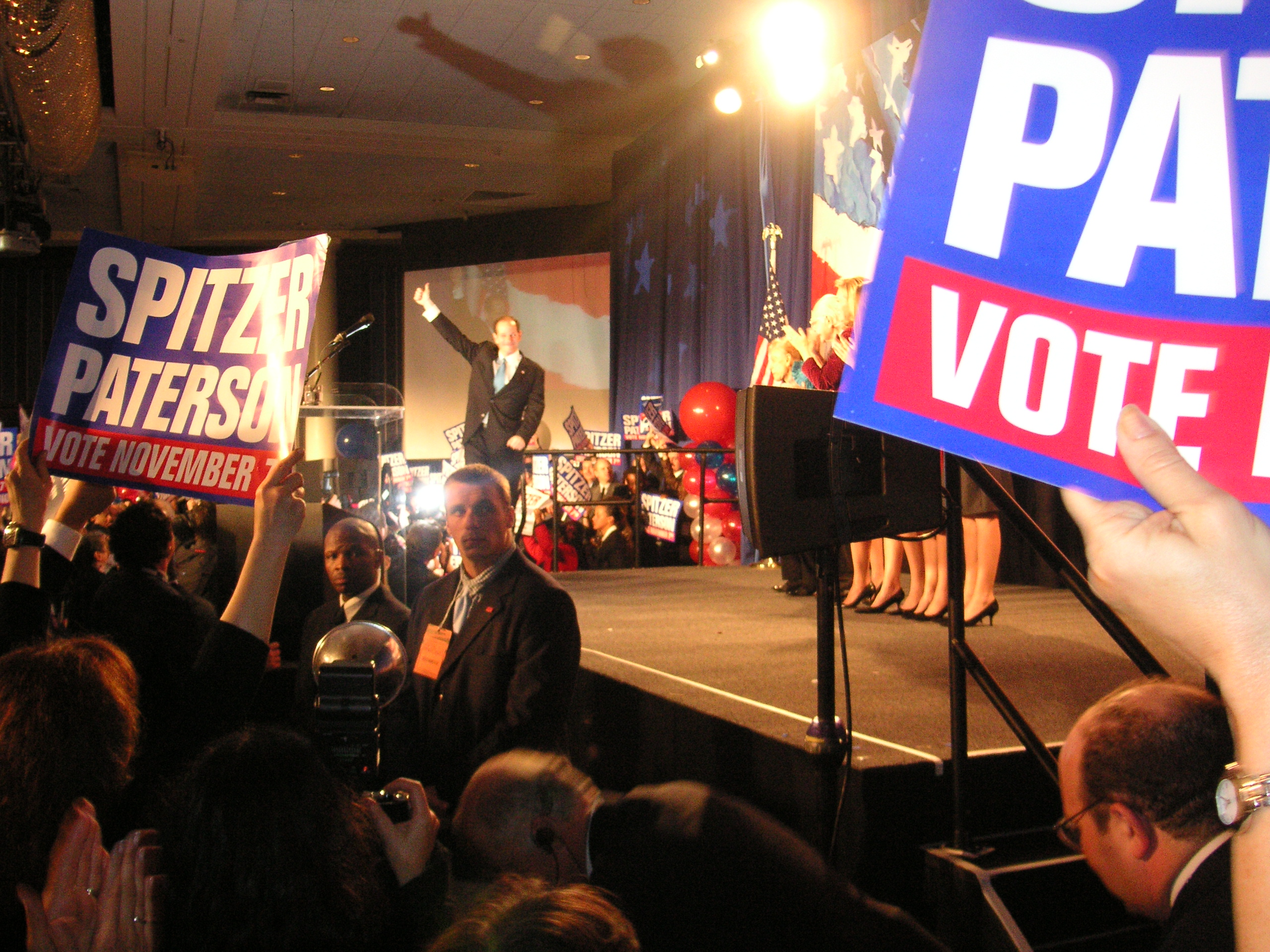
Spitzer celebrating on election night

On December 8, 2004, Spitzer announced his intention to seek the Democratic nomination for governor of New York. While long rumored, Spitzer's announcement was unusually early—nearly two years before the election. As a result of Spitzer's relative speed in bringing state Democrats to his side, he gained the respect of Democratic leaders nationwide. New Mexico Governor Bill Richardson dubbed Spitzer the "future of the Democratic Party" at a fund raiser held in June 2005 for Spitzer's gubernatorial campaign.

In January 2006, Spitzer selected New York State Senate minority leader David Paterson as his choice for lieutenant governor and running mate. After announcing his candidacy, Spitzer was endorsed by numerous New Yorkers, including state Comptroller Alan Hevesi and two former New York City mayors, David Dinkins and Ed Koch. On May 30, 2006, Spitzer and Paterson won the endorsement of the New York State Democratic party. A June 2006 Quinnipiac University Polling Institute poll showed him leading Nassau county executive Thomas Suozzi 76–13 percent. On July 25, 2006, he faced Suozzi in a gubernatorial debate held at Pace University in Manhattan, discussing issues such as public authorities and Medicaid. When asked about marijuana, Spitzer stated that he disagrees with medicinal use of the drug, claiming that other medicines were more effective. In the Democratic primary held on September 12, 2006, Spitzer handily defeated Suozzi, securing his party's nomination with 81 percent of the vote.

On October 5, Spitzer addressed the Empire State Pride Agenda and declared that he would work as governor to legalize gay marriage in New York.

Spitzer was elected governor on November 7, 2006, when he defeated Republican John Faso and Libertarian John Clifton, among others, with 69 percent of the vote. He won with the largest margin of victory ever in a New York gubernatorial race.

== Governor of New York ==
The Spitzer Executive Chamber
Office	Name	Term
Governor	Eliot Spitzer	2007–2008
Lieutenant Governor	David Paterson	2007–2008
Secretary to the Governor	Rich Baum	2007–2008
General Counsel	David Nocenti	2007–2008
Communications Director	Darren Dopp	2007–2007
Christine Anderson	2007–2008
Director of State Operations	Olivia Golden	2007–2008
Paul Francis	2008–2008
Chief of Staff	Marlene Turner	2007–2008
Office of the Attorney General	Andrew Cuomo	2007–2008
Office of the Inspector General	Kristine Hamann	2007–2008
Office of the Comptroller	Thomas Sanzillo (Acting)	2007–2007
Thomas DiNapoli	2007–2008
Department of Agriculture and Markets	Patrick Hooker	2007–2008
Department of Banking	Richard H. Neiman	2007–2008
Department of Civil Service	Nancy G. Groenwegen	2007–2008
Department of Corrections and Community Supervision	Brian Fischer	2007–2008
Department of Environmental Conservation	Alexander Pete Grannis	2007–2008
Education Department	Richard P. Mills	2007–2008
Department of Health	Richard F. Daines	2007–2008
Insurance Department	Eric R. Dinallo	2007–2008
Department of Labor	M. Patricia Smith	2007–2008
Department of Motor Vehicles	David Swarts	2007–2008
Department of Military & Naval Affairs	Maj. Gen. Joseph J. Taluto	2007–2008
Department of Public Service	Patricia Acampora	2007–2008
Garry A. Brown	2008–2008
Secretary of State	Lorraine Cortés-Vázquez	2007–2008
Department of Taxation and Finance	Robert L. Megna	2007–2008
Department of Transportation	Astrid C. Glynn	2007–2008

During the traditional midnight ceremony on January 1, 2007, Spitzer was sworn in as Governor of New York. A public ceremony was held at 1 p.m. on the same day that featured brass and percussion players from the Empire State Youth Orchestra. Bucking tradition, the ceremony was held outdoors—the first outdoor inauguration ceremony in New York for over a century. After taking the oath of office, he attended a concert at the Times Union Center in his honor, headlined by James Taylor and Natalie Merchant.

=== Legislative measures supported ===
- Jonathan's Law. In May 2007, Governor Spitzer signed this legislation concerning parental and guardian access to files and records concerning their children and child abuse investigations.
- The Reproductive Health and Privacy Protection Act, an abortion rights measure introduced by Spitzer in 2007.

=== Roadblocks to reform ===
Spitzer's reform-based platform, and his pledge "to change the ethics of Albany", hit an early roadblock when his ideas on how to fill vacancies in the executive department were defeated by the state legislature. According to the New York State Constitution, it is the duty of the state legislature to fill executive vacancies. The governor was criticized as unreasonable for admonishing the legislature when it took constitutional actions. The appointment of state assemblyman Thomas DiNapoli to succeed the disgraced Alan Hevesi as New York State Comptroller was a serious blow to the new governor. Spitzer had backed an outside panel to draft a list of qualified candidates; the legislature resisted Spitzer's desires when these included no legislators.

Spitzer traveled to the home districts of Democratic assemblymen William B. Magnarelli and George S. Latimer (in Syracuse and Westchester County, respectively), and publicly criticized them for their votes on DiNapoli; he had plans to exert similar pressure on other of his party's legislators.

Spitzer's budget quickly turned into a deficit, as by the end of October it was projected the state would run a deficit exceeding $4 billion for the year. During Spitzer's first year the state payroll increased, aggravating the budget problem. Despite increasing the public sector payroll, in late 2007 New York State started leading the nation in lost jobs. The 2008–09 budget included measures to counter the Great Recession.

In the wake of the political surveillance controversy involving Bruno (see below), Spitzer was accused of pandering to special interest groups to solidify his base of support. "The governor who took office vowing to clean up Albany has lost so much public support that he is reduced to feathering the nest of the unions and other liberals", wrote Michael Goodwin of the Daily News.

Spitzer was criticized by members of the New York State Legislature for failing to compromise on issues during his first few months as governor. In one exchange, Spitzer told New York State Assembly Minority Leader James Tedisco: "Listen, I'm a fucking steamroller and I'll roll over you and anybody else". Spitzer's reputation as a "steamroller" was shared by a plurality of New Yorkers in a Quinnipiac University poll, but by a 3-to-1 margin they believed the tactic had been unsuccessful and had only added to political gridlock. Tedisco later accused Spitzer of cutting $300,000 of state funding for health care and education grants in the Schenectady area as retaliation for Tedisco's opposition to the Spitzer plan to allow illegal immigrants New York State driver's licenses. Tedisco accused the Governor of "dirty tricks" and "bullying".

In February 2008, The Washington Post published an op-ed written by Spitzer in which he criticized the Bush administration for inhibiting states from pursuing predatory lenders.

=== Proposal to legalize same-sex marriage ===
In April 2007, Spitzer proposed a bill that would legalize same-sex marriage in New York. State Senate Majority Leader Joe Bruno announced his opposition to the proposal. This legislation passed in the State Assembly on June 19, 2007, but was denied in the State Senate and was returned to the Assembly.

=== Use of State Police for surveillance / "Troopergate" ===
On July 23, 2007, New York Attorney General Andrew Cuomo's office admonished the Spitzer administration for ordering the State Police to keep special records of Senate majority leader Joseph Bruno's whereabouts when he traveled with police escorts in New York City.

A 57-page report issued by the Attorney General's office concluded that Spitzer engaged in creating media coverage concerning Senator Bruno's travel. The investigation looked into both Bruno's travel and the Senate leader's allegation that Spitzer used State Police to spy on him. Cuomo concluded that "These e-mails show that persons in the governor's office did not merely produce records under a FOIL request, but were instead engaged in planning and producing media coverage concerning Senator Bruno's travel on state aircraft before any FOIL request was made." It also suggests that the governor's staff lied when they tried to explain what they had done and forced the State Police to go far beyond their normal procedures in documenting Bruno's whereabouts.

The report cleared Bruno of any misuse of the state's air fleet, which had been alleged. The report criticized Spitzer's office for using State Police resources to gather information about Bruno's travel and releasing the information to the media. The findings of the report were endorsed by Spitzer's own Inspector General, Kristine Hamann.

Spitzer responded at a July 23 press conference that "As governor, I am accountable for what goes on in the executive branch and I accept responsibility for the actions of my office" and that his administration had "grossly mishandled" the situation. Spitzer subsequently announced that he would indefinitely suspend his communications director, Darren Dopp, and reassign another top official. When questioned about his promise to bring ethical responsibility to state politics, Spitzer responded by saying "I will not tolerate this behavior", "ethics and accountability must and will remain rigorous in my administration," and that "I have always stated that I want ethics and integrity to be the hallmarks of my administration. That is why I requested that the State Inspector General review the allegations with respect to my office, and that is why we have fully cooperated with both inquiries."

The investigations of the event, dubbed "Troopergate" by media outlets, were not affected by Spitzer's resignation. As of March 2008, four probes by the state Attorney General's office, the State Senate Investigations Committee, the Albany County District Attorney's Office, and the New York Commission on Public Integrity were ongoing.

=== Driver's licenses for illegal immigrants ===
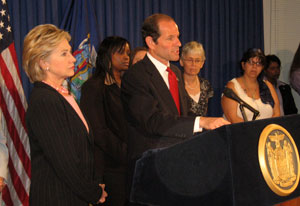
Spitzer with Hillary Clinton in 2007

On September 21, 2007, Spitzer issued an executive order directing that state offices allow illegal immigrants to be issued driver's licenses effective December 2007. Applicants for driver's licenses would not be required to prove legal immigration status and would be allowed to present a foreign passport as identification. In October 2007, after meeting with the Department of Homeland Security, Spitzer altered the plan so that licenses issued to migrant workers would look different from other licenses and that the new licenses would not allow access to airplanes and federal buildings.

On October 22, 2007, the State Senate passed legislation that would have overturned Spitzer's plan to allow driver licenses to be obtained by undocumented immigrants. The bill passed by a margin of 39 to 19, receiving bipartisan support. Eight Democrats from moderate districts broke with Spitzer on the vote. After the vote, The New York Times called this issue "Mr. Spitzer's single most unpopular decision since he took office".

Following the State Senate's vote, Spitzer revised his plan again, proposing the issuance of a third type of driver's license. This driver's license would be available only to United States citizens who are New York State residents, and would be valid for crossing the Canada–United States border. Spitzer also announced that the expiration dates of temporary visas would be printed on the driver's licenses of individuals living in the country with them.

On November 14, the day following the release of a poll showing the proposal as extremely unpopular with voters, Spitzer announced he would withdraw the plan, acknowledging that it would never be implemented. The decision drew derision from the press, as the Associated Press termed this reversal a "surrender". WCBS-TV labeled him "Governor Flip-Flop".

=== Approval rating as governor ===
As of November 13, 2007, Spitzer's approval rating as governor was 33 percent, a further decline from his 44% approval rating of October 24, 2007. A Siena College poll showed that New York City Mayor Michael Bloomberg would defeat Spitzer were he to seek reelection. Two polls in December 2007 showed further erosion in Spitzer's public standing.

=== Prostitution scandal ===
On March 10, 2008, The New York Times reported that Spitzer had patronized a high-priced escort service called Emperors Club VIP and met for two hours with a $1,000-an-hour call girl. This information originally came to the attention of authorities from a federal wiretap. Over a six-month period, Spitzer had at least seven or eight appointments with women from the agency and paid it more than $15,000. According to published reports, investigators alleged that Spitzer paid up to $80,000 for prostitutes over a period of several years while he was attorney general and, later, as governor. Spitzer first drew the attention of federal investigators when his bank reported suspicious money transfers under the anti–money laundering provisions of the Bank Secrecy Act and the Patriot Act. The resulting investigation was triggered by the belief that Spitzer might have been hiding bribe proceeds and led to the discovery of the prostitution ring.

Later on March 10, with his wife standing near the podium, Spitzer held a press conference apologizing to his family and to the public. He added, "I must now dedicate some time to regain the trust of my family".

Following Spitzer's March 10 press conference, New York State Assembly Republican Minority Leader James Tedisco and Republican New York Representative Peter King separately called for his resignation. Tedisco later announced that he would initiate impeachment proceedings in the State Assembly if Spitzer did not resign.

The governor's prostitution scandal became international news.

=== Resignation ===
In the wake of the revelations and amid threats of impeachment, Spitzer announced on March 12, 2008, that he would resign his post as governor at noon on March 17, 2008. Spitzer said at a news conference in Manhattan:

I cannot allow for my private failings to disrupt the people's work. Over the course of my public life, I have insisted—I believe correctly—that people take responsibility for their conduct. I can and will ask no less of myself. For this reason, I am resigning from the office of governor.

Lieutenant Governor David Paterson succeeded Spitzer as governor of New York.

== Post-resignation life and career ==
In 2011, The Guardian summarized Spitzer's history as follows:

Long before there was Barack Obama there was Spitzer. While Obama toiled unknown in Illinois, the Bronx-born Spitzer won himself a national reputation as the "Sheriff of Wall Street". He was New York's tough-talking attorney-general, who fought banking corruption, enforced environment law and won rights for low-paid workers. He used that fame to enter politics and in 2006 became governor of New York: a perfect springboard for the White House. Before America fell in love with its first black president, people wondered if it was willing to embrace its first Jewish one. Spitzer could have made history.

Instead he left office in disgrace three years ago amid a flood of tabloid headlines that recounted salacious details from his repeated use of a high-end escort service. Spitzer was dubbed the "Luv Guv" and forced into a political wilderness. Rarely in American politics was a fall from grace so spectacular, so complete and so clearly down to a self-inflicted human flaw.

=== Prostitution scandal developments ===
On July 16, 2008, The New York Times published an article that explained how Spitzer used campaign funds to pay for two Mayflower Hotel bookings, $411.06 apiece, where he was alleged to have met with prostitutes. While it remains unclear if Spitzer stayed in the hotel on the nights he booked, the Times has stated that Spitzer met with prostitutes in early 2008. Spitzer declined to comment on the issue.

In November 2008, prosecutors who were in charge of the case announced that Spitzer would not face criminal charges for his involvement in the sex ring. They cited that no evidence of misuse of public funds was found and therefore it would not serve the public interest to press charges against Spitzer. Spitzer offered an apology, saying, "I appreciate the impartiality and thoroughness of the investigation by the U.S. Attorney's Office, and I acknowledge and accept responsibility for the conduct it disclosed."

=== Teaching ===
In September 2009, Spitzer joined the faculty of the City College of New York as an adjunct instructor of political science and taught an undergraduate course called "Law and Public Policy".

=== Media appearances ===
Spitzer continued to make public appearances and engage in media commitments following his resignation. The Washington Post published a Spitzer opinion piece in November 2008 conveying his analysis of the 2008 financial crisis and suggested remedies. Spitzer concluded the piece by saying that he hoped the Obama administration would make the right policy choices, "although mistakes I made in my private life now prevent me from participating in these issues as I have in the past."

Spitzer became a regular columnist for Slate magazine and in December 2008 Slate published the first of a new series of columns by Spitzer dedicated to the economy. Spitzer was sued by two former Marsh & McLennan executives over an August 2010 Slate column about the Wall Street firm, who alleged the column was libelous. A federal judge dismissed the lawsuit the following year.

Spitzer took on various public speaking arrangements, beginning with a discussion with the New York chapter of the Entrepreneurs' Organization on June 17, 2009.

He also made a number of television appearances in 2009 and 2010, including Real Time with Bill Maher and Campbell Brown (CNN program), as well as appearing as a substitute anchor on MSNBC. On June 24, 2010, CNN announced that Spitzer would be joining the network to host a "round-table" discussion program alongside center-right commentator Kathleen Parker. Parker Spitzer, compared by some media outlets to the defunct Crossfire, replaced Campbell Brown in the 8:00 p.m. ET timeslot on weeknights starting in October. In February 2011, CNN announced that Parker was leaving the show, which was renamed In the Arena on February 28, 2011. On July 6, 2011, CNN announced it was canceling In the Arena and shifting Anderson Cooper 360° to the 8 p.m. time slot.

In March 2012, Spitzer joined Al Gore's cable television network, Current TV, in the wake of the sudden firing of Keith Olbermann from the network, and immediately began hosting his own program Viewpoint with Eliot Spitzer. In January 2013, Spitzer announced that he had left both Viewpoint and Current TV, and that he would not be joining Current TV in its latest venture with Al Jazeera, citing differences of approach.

=== Investing ===
In 2012, Spitzer became an investor in TipRanks, an Israeli financial technology start-up company that ranks Wall Street analysts. He became a member of the company's board of directors.

=== 2013 campaign for NYC Comptroller ===
On July 7, 2013, Spitzer announced he was running for New York City Comptroller and would start a petition the following day. 3,750 valid signatures from registered voters from his party were required by July 11 to register for the race; Spitzer was able to submit over 27,000 signatures to the city Board of Elections before the deadline. Spitzer commented that he was asking for forgiveness and hopeful that voters could forgive him. Spitzer lost the primary on September 10, 2013, to Scott Stringer.

=== Real estate career ===
Following his father's illness and death in 2014 and with politics behind him, Spitzer came to lead his family's real estate business, Spitzer Enterprises, despite having avoided the role for much of his life. Spitzer sold his company's apartments in The Corinthian and the Crown Building for a large profit, which he used to fund a $700 million project of three waterfront buildings in South Williamsburg, Brooklyn. A lawsuit over one of those Williamsburg buildings was filed against Spitzer Enterprises in 2026. The firm was accused of violating New York rent regulations and post-2019 state laws. Spitzer disputed the allegations.

=== Extortion victim ===
According to prosecutors, Spitzer was the victim of a long-running extortion scheme by Svetlana Travis-Zakharova, a Russian woman who was arrested in October 2016 and charged with forgery and grand larceny. Prosecutors said that Travis-Zakharova extracted $400,000 from Spitzer and also attempted to extort $5,000 from a different man, a toy store owner, and forged his signature on an apartment lease. Travis-Zakharova accused Spitzer of assault in 2016, then later recanted the allegation and returned to Russia. Spitzer subsequently filed a civil suit against Travis-Zakharova, alleging that she had threatened to "ruin his life" unless he agreed to pay her large sums of money. She was arrested after returning to the U.S. for a visit and charged with forgery and grand larceny; in a plea agreement in 2017, she pleaded guilty to attempted petty larceny, a misdemeanor.

== Personal life ==
Silda Wall and Eliot Spitzer married in 1987. Together, they have three children. Silda Wall Spitzer stood beside her husband when he announced his resignation as New York governor following his prostitution scandal. On May 31, 2013, Spitzer and his wife were reported to be living apart. At the close of 2013, Spitzer and his wife announced the end of their marriage.

Spitzer had a romantic relationship with Lis Smith, a spokeswoman for then–New York City Mayor-elect Bill de Blasio. She had been Spitzer's spokeswoman during his 2013 run for comptroller. The relationship ended in 2015.

In 2019, Spitzer announced his engagement to Roxana Girand, founder and president of real estate agency Sebastian Capital. On April 4, 2020, Spitzer announced the wedding had been called off due to the COVID-19 pandemic. However in 2024, he revealed they had a small wedding that same day at his Columbia County home.

== See also ==
- Client 9: The Rise and Fall of Eliot Spitzer – film about Spitzer
- Inside Job – documentary on the 2008 financial crisis
- The Good Wife – fictional television drama partly inspired by events associated with Spitzer and his wife
- List of Jewish American jurists
- Zipper – 2015 film, a political thriller that thinly dramatizes the Eliot Spitzer scandal

Party political offices
Preceded by Karen Burstein	Democratic nominee for Attorney General of New York; 1998, 2002	Succeeded by Andrew Cuomo
Preceded by Carl McCall	Democratic nominee for Governor of New York; 2006	Succeeded by Andrew Cuomo
Legal offices
Preceded by Dennis Vacco	Attorney General of New York; 1999–2006	Succeeded by Andrew Cuomo
Political offices
Preceded by George Pataki	Governor of New York; 2007–2008	Succeeded by David Paterson
U.S. order of precedence (ceremonial)
Preceded by George Pataki as Former Governor	Order of precedence of the United States	Succeeded by David Paterson as Former Governor
