= Catherine M. Abate =

American politician (1947–2014)

Member of the New York State Senate from the 27th district
- In office 1995–1998
- Preceded by: Manfred Ohrenstein
- Succeeded by: Thomas Duane

Commissioner of the New York City Department of Correction
- In office 1992–1995
- Appointed by: David Dinkins

Personal details
- Born: December 8, 1947 Atlantic City, New Jersey, U.S.
- Died: May 17, 2014 (aged 66) Kips Bay, Manhattan, New York, U.S.
- Spouse: Ron Kliegerman
- Education: Vassar College; Boston University School of Law (JD)

Catherine M. Abate (December 8, 1947 – May 17, 2014) was a New York State Senator. She was also a former commissioner of New York City's Correction Department.

Abate was of Italian ancestry. Her father was Joseph Abate, a longtime member of the Lucchese crime family. She was born on December 8, 1947, in Atlantic City, New Jersey. She received her bachelor's degree from Vassar College in 1969 and her Juris Doctor degree from Boston University School of Law in 1972. After graduating, she first attracted attention for her work as a young lawyer at New York City's Legal Aid Society.

New York Governor Mario Cuomo appointed her as the executive deputy commissioner of the State Division of Human Rights. In 1988, she was appointed to head the state's Crime Victim's Board. She was an attorney in New York City and was director of training in the criminal defense division. She also on the Governor's Task Force on Rape and Sexual Assault. In 1992, then-New York City Mayor David Dinkins appointed Abate as City Commissioner for the Department of Corrections. The New Jersey-born Democrat served two terms (1995–1999), representing a district in Manhattan. In 1998, she gave up her seat to run for New York State Attorney General. Abate lost the Democratic primary to Eliot Spitzer. After leaving politics, she spent fifteen years working as President/CEO of the Community Healthcare Network.

== Death ==
Abate died on May 17, 2014, aged 66, in Bellevue Hospital from uterine cancer.

New York State Senate
Preceded by Manfred Ohrenstein	Member of the New York State Senate from the 27th district 1995–1998	Succeeded by Thomas Duane
