= New York State Right to Life Party =

American political party

- Founded: 1970; 56 years ago
- Registered voters (2006): 40,278
- Ideology: Anti-abortion
- Slogan: Ordinary people doing extraordinary things
- Seats in the U.S. Senate (New York): 0 / 2
- Seats in the U.S. House (New York): 0 / 26
- Statewide Executive Offices: 0 / 4
- New York State Assembly: 0 / 150
- New York State Senate: 0 / 63

Website
- nysrighttolife.org

One of the party's logos, showing a fetus in the womb.

The New York State Right to Life Party is a minor anti-abortion American political party active only in the state of New York that was founded to oppose the state's legalization of abortion in 1970.

== History ==
In 1970, the Right to Life Party was formed in New York following the decriminalization of abortion in New York. The party attempted to run a gubernatorial ticket made up of Jane Gilroy and Marcia Pilsner and obtained 14,062 signatures, 2,000 more than the 12,000 needed to receive ballot access. However, Secretary of State John P. Lomenzo rejected the petition and the decision was upheld by the state supreme court.

The party first made the state ballot in the 1978 gubernatorial election, where its candidate Mary Jane Tobin won 130,000 votes. Its share of the vote subsequently declined, although it maintained official ballot status until 2002, when it fell short of the 50,000 votes required to remain on the ballot. In 2006, the party endorsed Reverend Jennifer Liese for Governor. Liese's signatures were disputed by a Republican staffer, Rachel L. Bledi. As of November 2006 there were 40,278 members statewide. The party did not endorse a gubernatorial candidate in 2010, though it has been able to get two state supreme court nominees onto the ballot via the petition process.

In 1980, Ronald Reagan attempted to gain the extra ballot access line provided by the party, but he was rejected after refusing to agree to the terms that he must choose an anti-abortion vice presidential candidate, endorse Al D'Amato against Jacob Javits in the Republican Senate primary, and to endorse only those Republicans that supported an anti-abortion constitutional amendment. The party ran Ellen McCormack, who had run in the 1976 Democratic Party presidential primaries, in the 1980 presidential election, and she received 32,327 votes nationally and 24,159 in New York; Reagan won the state against Carter by 165,459 even without the extra ballot line. In 1984, the party refused to run or endorse any candidate for president by a vote of 27,000 to 22,000. The leadership of the party criticized and stated that Reagan was not anti-abortion enough due to his stance on that issue as governor of California and for having George H. W. Bush as his running mate. In 1992, despite having refused to give Reagan its ballot line due to George H. W. Bush being his vice president, the chairwoman of the party stated that his vetoes of abortion rights bills made them willing to give him their nomination.

In 1996, the party gave its ballot line to Constitution Party candidate Howard Phillips, which was the only time that the party has appeared on the New York presidential ballot.

On August 18, 2000, the party voted to give Reform nominee Patrick Buchanan an additional ballot line for the presidential election, over George W. Bush, who had given them no response, and Howard Phillips, which was accepted on September 23.

Despite losing ballot access in 2002, the party endorsed Mitt Romney in 2012, and Donald Trump in 2016 and 2020.

== Electoral performance ==
=== Presidential ===
Year	Presidential nominee	Vice presidential nominee	Votes	Change
1980	Ellen McCormack	Carroll Driscoll	32,327 (0.04%)	Steady
1984	No nominee	No nominee	0 (0.00%)	▼0.04%
1988	William A. Marra	Joan Andrews	20,504 (0.02%)	▲0.02%
1992	George H. W. Bush (Note: Endorsed Republican Party nominee)	Dan Quayle	127,959 (1.85%) (Note: Total only for New York state)	▲1.83%
1996	Howard Phillips (Note: Endorsed U.S. Taxpayers Party nominee)	Herbert Titus	23,580 (0.37%) (Note: Total only for New York state)	▼1.46%
2000	Pat Buchanan (Note: Endorsed Reform Party nominee)	Ezola Foster	25,175 (0.37%) (Note: Total only for New York state)	Steady

=== Gubernatorial ===
Year	Gubernatorial nominee	Lieutenant gubernatorial nominee	Votes	Change
1978	Mary Jane Tobin	Ellen McCormack	130,193 (2.73%)	Steady
1982	Robert Bohner	Paul Callahan	52,356 (1.00%)	▼1.73%
1986	Denis Dillon	Thomas Droleskey	130,827 (3.05%)	▲2.05%
1990	Louis Wein	Gertrude Manning	137,804 (3.40%)	▲0.35%
1994	Robert T. Walsh	Virginia Sutton	67,750 (1.30%)	▼2.10%
1998	Michael J. Reynolds	Karen Prior	56,683 (1.20%)	▼0.10%
2002	Gerald Cronin	Stasia T. Vogel	44,195 (0.97%)	▼0.28%
2006	Jennifer S. Liese	Wendy Holibaugh	(no ballot access)	▼0.97%

=== Comptroller ===
Year	Nominee	Votes	Change
1998	Douglas H. Harknett	70,397 (1.59%)	Steady
2002	Garifalia Christea	61,464 (1.48%)	▼0.11%

=== Attorney general ===
Year	Nominee	Votes	Change
1998	Robert W. Dapelo	60,399 (1.40%)	Steady
2002	John J. Broderick	78,268 (1.89%)	▲0.49%

== Voter registration ==
Year	RV.	%	Change
1996	45,772	(0.45%)	Steady
1997	48,855	(0.46%)	▲0.01%
1998	50,600	(0.47%)	▲0.01%
1999	51,856	(0.48%)	▲0.01%
2000	53,107	(0.47%)	▼0.01%
2001	50,033	(0.45%)	▼0.02%
2002	49,482	(0.44%)	▼0.01%
2003	46,827	(0.43%)	▼0.01%
2004	46,026	(0.39%)	▼0.04%
2005	41,268	(0.36%)	▼0.03%
2006	40,278	(0.35%)	▼0.01%

== See also ==
- Category:New York State Right to Life Party politicians
- Politics of New York (state)
- Elections in New York
- Family Health Care Decisions Act
