= 182nd New York State Legislature =

New York state legislative session

←	181st	183rd	→
- New York State Capitol (2009)

Overview
- Legislative body: New York State Legislature
- Jurisdiction: New York, United States
- Term: January 1, 1977 – December 31, 1978

Senate
- Members: 60
- President: Lt. Gov. Mary Anne Krupsak (D)
- Temporary President: Warren M. Anderson (R)
- Party control: Republican (36–24)

Assembly
- Members: 150
- Speaker: Stanley Steingut (D)
- Party control: Democratic; 1977: (90–60); 1978: (87–61–2)

Sessions
- 1st: January 5 – July 15, 1977
- 2nd: January 4 – June 24, 1978

The 182nd New York State Legislature, consisting of the New York State Senate and the New York State Assembly, met in Albany from January 5, 1977, to December 31, 1978, during the third and fourth years of Hugh Carey's governorship.

== Background ==
Under the provisions of the New York Constitution of 1938 and the U.S. Supreme Court decision to follow the One man, one vote rule, re-apportioned in 1971, and amended in 1974, by the Legislature, 60 Senators and 150 assemblymen were elected in single-seat districts for two-year terms. Senate and Assembly districts consisted of approximately the same number of inhabitants, the area being apportioned contiguously without restrictions regarding county boundaries.

At this time there were two major political parties: the Republican Party and the Democratic Party. The Conservative Party, the Liberal Party, the Communist Party, the Socialist Workers Party, the Libertarian Party and the Labor Party also nominated tickets.

== Elections ==
The 1976 New York state election was held on November 2. The only statewide elective offices up for election was a U.S. Senator from New York. Democrat Daniel Patrick Moynihan, with Liberal endorsement, defeated the incumbent Conservative James L. Buckley who had Republican endorsement. The approximate party strength at this election, as expressed by the vote for U.S. Senator, was: Democrats 3,239,000; Republicans 2,525,000; Conservatives 311,000; Liberals 184,000; Communists 25,000; Socialist Workers 16,000; Libertarians 11,000; and Labor 7,000.

Eight of the eleven women members of the previous legislature—State Senators Carol Bellamy (Dem.), a lawyer of Brooklyn; Karen Burstein (Dem.), a lawyer of Lawrence; and Linda Winikow (Dem.), of Spring Valley; and Assemblywomen Jean Amatucci (Dem.), a registered nurse of White Lake; Elizabeth Connelly (Dem.), of Staten Island; Estella B. Diggs (Dem.), of the Bronx; Mary B. Goodhue (Rep.), a lawyer of Mount Kisco; and Gerdi E. Lipschutz (Dem.), of Queens—were re-elected. Mary Rose McGee (Dem.), of Huntington, was also elected to the Assembly.

The 1977 New York state electionwas held on November 8. No statewide elective offices were up for election. Two vacancies in the Assembly were filled. State Senator Carol Bellamy was elected President of the New York City Council.

On February 14, 1978, Pinny Cooke (Rep.) was elected to fill a vacancy in the Assembly; and on April 11, 1978, Olga A. Méndez (Dem.) was elected to fill a vacancy in the State Senate.

== Sessions ==
The Legislature met for the first regular session (the 200th) at the State Capitol in Albany on January 5, 1977; and recessed indefinitely on July 15.

Stanley Steingut (Dem.) was re-elected Speaker.

Warren M. Anderson (Rep.) was re-elected Temporary President of the State Senate.

The Legislature met for the second regular session (the 201st) at the State Capitol in Albany on January 4, 1978; and recessed indefinitely on June 24.

On March 14, 1978, Assemblywoman Jean Amatucci had a baby son, becoming the first New York state legislator to give birth during her elected term.

== State Senate ==
=== Senators ===
The asterisk (*) denotes members of the previous Legislature who continued in office as members of this Legislature.

Note: For brevity, the chairmanships omit the words "...the Committee on (the)..."

District	Senator	Party	Notes
1st	Kenneth LaValle	Republican	
2nd	Bernard C. Smith*	Republican	
3rd	Caesar Trunzo*	Republican	
4th	Owen H. Johnson*	Republican	
5th	Ralph J. Marino*	Republican	
6th	John R. Dunne*	Republican	
7th	John D. Caemmerer*	Republican	
8th	Norman J. Levy*	Republican	
9th	Karen Burstein*	Democrat	on April 11, 1978, appointed to the New York Public Service Commission
10th	vacant	Senator-elect John J. Santucci (D) appointed on December 30, 1976, as D.A. of Queens County	
10th	Sheldon Farber	Republican	on March 1, 1977, elected to fill vacancy
11th	Frank Padavan*	Republican	
12th	Jack E. Bronston*	Democrat	
13th	Emanuel R. Gold*	Democrat	
14th	Anthony V. Gazzara*	Democrat	
15th	Martin J. Knorr*	Republican	
16th	Howard E. Babbush*	Democrat	
17th	Major Owens*	Democrat	
18th	Thomas J. Bartosiewicz*	Democrat	
19th	Jeremiah B. Bloom*	Democrat	
20th	Donald Halperin*	Democrat	
21st	William T. Conklin*	Republican	Deputy Majority Leader
22nd	Albert B. Lewis*	Democrat	on January 4, 1978, appointed as Superintendent of Insurance
22nd	Martin M. Solomon	Democrat	on February 14, 1978, elected to fill vacancy
23rd	Vander L. Beatty*	Democrat	
24th	John J. Marchi*	Republican	Chairman of Finance
25th	Carol Bellamy*	Democrat	on November 8, 1977, elected President of the New York City Council
25th	Martin Connor	Democrat	on February 14, 1978, elected to fill vacancy
26th	Roy M. Goodman*	Republican	
27th	Manfred Ohrenstein*	Democrat	Minority Leader
28th	Carl McCall*	Democrat	
29th	Franz S. Leichter*	Democrat	
30th	Robert García*	Democrat	on February 14, 1978, elected to the 95th U.S. Congress
30th	Olga A. Méndez	Democrat	on April 11, 1978, elected to fill vacancy
31st	Israel Ruiz Jr.*	Democrat	
32nd	Joseph L. Galiber*	Democrat	
33rd	Abraham Bernstein*	Democrat	
34th	John D. Calandra*	Republican	
35th	John E. Flynn*	Republican	
36th	Joseph R. Pisani*	Republican	
37th	Bernard G. Gordon*	Republican	died on May 4, 1978
38th	Linda Winikow*	Democrat	
39th	Jay P. Rolison Jr.*	Republican	
40th	Richard E. Schermerhorn*	Republican	
41st	Joseph Bruno	Republican	
42nd	Howard C. Nolan Jr.*	Democrat	
43rd	Ronald B. Stafford*	Republican	
44th	Hugh T. Farley	Republican	
45th	Hugh Douglas Barclay*	Republican	
46th	James H. Donovan*	Republican	
47th	Warren M. Anderson*	Republican	re-elected Temporary President
48th	Edwyn E. Mason*	Republican	
49th	Martin S. Auer*	Republican	
50th	Tarky Lombardi Jr.*	Republican	
51st	William T. Smith*	Republican	
52nd	Frederick L. Warder*	Republican	
53rd	John D. Perry*	Democrat	
54th	Fred J. Eckert*	Republican	
55th	Joseph A. Tauriello*	Democrat	
56th	James D. Griffin*	Democrat	on November 8, 1977, elected Mayor of Buffalo
56th	Raymond F. Gallagher	Democrat	on February 14, 1978, elected to fill vacancy
57th	Jess J. Present*	Republican	
58th	Dale M. Volker*	Republican	
59th	James T. McFarland*	Republican	on June 23, 1978, appointed to the New York State Civil Service Commission
60th	Lloyd H. Paterson*	Republican	on August 7, 1978, convicted of theft

=== Employees ===
- Secretary: Roger C. Thompson

== State Assembly ==
=== Assemblymen ===
The asterisk (*) denotes members of the previous Legislature who continued in office as members of this Legislature.

Note: For brevity, the chairmanships omit the words "...the Committee on (the)..."

District	Assemblymen	Party	Notes
1st	Perry B. Duryea Jr.*	Republican	Minority Leader
2nd	George J. Hochbrueckner*	Democrat	
3rd	Icilio W. Bianchi Jr.*	Democrat	
4th	Robert C. Wertz*	Republican	
5th	Paul E. Harenberg*	Democrat	
6th	John C. Cochrane*	Republican	
7th	John J. Flanagan*	Republican	
8th	Mary Rose McGee	Democrat	
9th	William L. Burns*	Republican	Minority Coordinator of Committees
10th	Lewis J. Yevoli*	Democrat	
11th	Philip B. Healey*	Republican	
12th	George A. Murphy*	Republican	on November 7, 1978, elected to the New York Supreme Court
13th	Thomas S. Gulotta	Republican	
14th	Joseph M. Reilly*	Republican	
15th	Angelo F. Orazio*	Democrat	
16th	Irwin J. Landes*	Democrat	
17th	Kemp Hannon	Republican	
18th	Armand P. D'Amato*	Republican	
19th	Raymond J. McGrath	Republican	
20th	Arthur J. Kremer*	Democrat	Chairman of Ways and Means
21st	Henry W. Dwyer*	Republican	in January 1978, appointed as Deputy County Executive of Nassau Co.
21st	George H. Madison	Republican	on February 14, 1978, elected to fill vacancy
22nd	Gerdi E. Lipschutz*	Democrat	
23rd	John A. Esposito*	Republican	
24th	Saul Weprin*	Democrat	
25th	Vincent F. Nicolosi*	Democrat	
26th	Leonard P. Stavisky*	Democrat	
27th	Arthur J. Cooperman*	Democrat	
28th	Alan G. Hevesi*	Democrat	
29th	Guy R. Brewer*	Democrat	
30th	Ralph Goldstein	Democrat	
31st	Alfred A. DelliBovi*	Republican	
32nd	Edward Abramson*	Democrat	
33rd	John T. Flack*	Republican	
34th	Ivan C. Lafayette	Democrat	
35th	John G. Lopresto*	Republican	
36th	Denis J. Butler*	Democrat	
37th	Clifford E. Wilson	Democrat	
38th	Frederick D. Schmidt*	Democrat	
39th	Stanley Fink*	Democrat	Majority Leader
40th	Edward Griffith*	Democrat	
41st	Stanley Steingut*	Democrat	re-elected Speaker
42nd	David P. Greenberg	Democrat	
43rd	George A. Cincotta*	Democrat	on June 22, 1978, appointed as Chairman of the NYS Commission on Cable TV
44th	Mel Miller*	Democrat	
45th	Chuck Schumer*	Democrat	
46th	Howard L. Lasher*	Democrat	
47th	Frank J. Barbaro*	Democrat	
48th	Leonard Silverman*	Democrat	on May 6, 1977, appointed to the New York Court of Claims
48th	Samuel Hirsch	Democrat	on November 8, 1977, elected to fill vacancy
49th	Dominick L. DiCarlo*	Republican	Deputy Minority Leader
50th	Christopher J. Mega*	Republican	
51st	Joseph Ferris*	Democrat	
52nd	Michael L. Pesce*	Democrat	
53rd	Woodrow Lewis*	Democrat	
54th	Thomas S. Boyland	Democrat	
55th	Thomas R. Fortune*	Democrat	
56th	Albert Vann*	Democrat	
57th	Harvey L. Strelzin*	Democrat	
58th	Joseph R. Lentol*	Democrat	
59th	Peter G. Mirto*	Democrat	
60th	Guy Molinari*	Republican	
61st	Elizabeth Connelly*	Democrat	
62nd	Louis DeSalvio*	Democrat	
63rd	Sheldon Silver	Democrat	
64th	William F. Passannante*	Democrat	
65th	Andrew J. Stein*	Democrat	on November 8, 1977, elected Borough President of Manhattan
65th	Steven Sanders	Democrat	on February 14, 1978, elected to fill vacancy
66th	Mark Alan Siegel*	Democrat	
67th	Richard N. Gottfried*	Democrat	Chairman of Codes
68th	Alexander B. Grannis*	Democrat	
69th	Jerrold Nadler	Democrat	
70th	Edward C. Sullivan	Democrat	
71st	George W. Miller*	Democrat	
72nd	Angelo Del Toro*	Democrat	
73rd	Edward H. Lehner*	Democrat	
74th	Herman D. Farrell Jr.*	Democrat	
75th	José E. Serrano*	Democrat	
76th	Seymour Posner*	Democrat	on February 22, 1978, appointed to the NYS Workmen's Compensation Board
76th	Charles R. Johnson	Liberal	on April 11, 1978, elected to fill vacancy
77th	Armando Montano*	Democrat	
78th	Estella B. Diggs*	Democrat	
79th	Louis Niñé*	Democrat	
80th	Guy J. Velella*	Republican	
81st	(Alan Hochberg*)	Democrat	did not take his seat; convicted of a felony; seat vacated on January 26, 1977
81st	Eliot Engel	Liberal	on March 1, 1977, elected to fill vacancy
82nd	Thomas J. Culhane*	Democrat	on September 19, 1977, appointed to the NYS Commission of Investigation
82nd	Sean P. Walsh	Democrat	on November 8, 1977, elected to fill vacancy
83rd	George Friedman	Democrat	
84th	G. Oliver Koppell*	Democrat	
85th	John C. Dearie*	Democrat	
86th	Vincent A. Marchiselli*	Democrat	
87th	Thomas J. McInerney	Democrat	
88th	Richard C. Ross*	Republican	
89th	William B. Finneran	Democrat	
90th	Gordon W. Burrows*	Republican	
91st	Edward F. X. Ryan Jr.	Democrat	
92nd	Peter M. Sullivan*	Republican	
93rd	Mary B. Goodhue*	Republican	
94th	Willis H. Stephens*	Republican	
95th	Eugene Levy*	Republican	
96th	Robert J. Connor*	Democrat	
97th	Lawrence Herbst*	Republican	
98th	Jean Amatucci*	Democrat	
99th	Emeel S. Betros*	Republican	
100th	Glenn E. Warren	Republican	
101st	Maurice D. Hinchey*	Democrat	
102nd	Clarence D. Lane*	Republican	
103rd	Fred G. Field Jr.*	Republican	on November 8, 1977, elected Supervisor of the Town of Colonie
103rd	Michael J. Hoblock Jr.	Republican	on February 14, 1978, elected to fill vacancy
104th	Richard J. Conners	Democrat	
105th	Charles D. Cook*	Republican	
106th	Neil W. Kelleher*	Republican	
107th	Clark C. Wemple*	Republican	
108th	Robert A. D'Andrea*	Republican	
109th	Glenn H. Harris*	Republican	Minority Whip
110th	Gerald B. H. Solomon*	Republican	on November 7, 1978, elected to the 96th U.S. Congress
111th	Andrew W. Ryan Jr.*	Republican	
112th	David O'Brien Martin	Republican	
113th	Peter S. Dokuchitz*	Republican	
114th	H. Robert Nortz	Republican	
115th	William R. Sears*	Republican	
116th	Nicholas J. Calogero*	Republican	
117th	John R. Zagame*	Republican	
118th	Leonard F. Bersani	Republican	
119th	Hyman M. Miller*	Republican	
120th	Melvin N. Zimmer	Democrat	
121st	William E. Bush	Republican	
122nd	Clarence D. Rappleyea Jr.*	Republican	
123rd	James W. McCabe*	Democrat	
124th	James R. Tallon Jr.*	Democrat	
125th	Lloyd Stephen Riford Jr.*	Republican	
126th	L. Richard Marshall*	Republican	
127th	Charles D. Henderson*	Republican	
128th	Gary A. Lee*	Republican	on November 7, 1978, elected to the 96th U.S. Congress
129th	James F. Hurley*	Republican	
130th	Thomas A. Hanna*	Republican	
131st	Gary Proud	Democrat	
132nd	Thomas R. Frey*	Democrat	on December 22, 1977, appointed as Director of State Operations
132nd	Pinny Cooke	Republican	on February 14, 1978, elected to fill vacancy
133rd	Andrew D. Virgilio*	Democrat	
134th	Roger J. Robach*	Democrat	
135th	James F. Nagle	Republican	
136th	James L. Emery*	Republican	Assistant Minority Leader
137th	R. Stephen Hawley*	Republican	
138th	John B. Daly*	Republican	
139th	Matthew J. Murphy Jr.*	Democrat	
140th	Robin L. Schimminger	Democrat	
141st	G. James Fremming*	Democrat	
142nd	Stephen R. Greco*	Democrat	
143rd	Arthur O. Eve*	Democrat	
144th	William B. Hoyt	Democrat	
145th	Richard J. Keane	Democrat	
146th	Dennis T. Gorski*	Democrat	
147th	Ronald H. Tills*	Republican	
148th	Vincent J. Graber, Sr.*	Democrat	
149th	Daniel B. Walsh*	Democrat	
150th	Rolland E. Kidder*	Democrat	

=== Employees ===
- Clerk: Catherine A. Carey

== Sources ==
- Election Day Doesn't Change Scene in Legislature in the Palladium–Times, of Oswego, on November 3, 1976
- Republicans Gain a Seat in Albany in The New York Times on February 16, 1978 (subscription required)
- Conklin Retiring As State Senator in the Schenectady Gazette, of Schenectady, on June 20, 1978
