= 2022 New York's 23rd congressional district special election =

- August 23, 2022

New York's 23rd congressional district
- Turnout: 17.43%
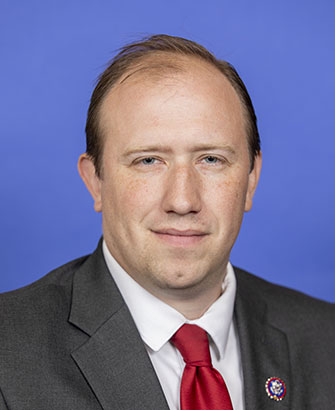

| Nominee | Joe Sempolinski | Max Della Pia |
| Party | Republican | Democratic |
| Alliance | Conservative | Working Families |
| Popular vote | 38,749 | 34,001 |
| Percentage | 53.1% | 46.6% |
- County results Sempolinski: 50–60% 60–70% 70–80% Della Pia: 80–90%
U.S. Representative before election
Tom Reed
Republican
Elected U.S. Representative
Joe Sempolinski
Republican

The 2022 New York's 23rd congressional district special election was a special election held on August 23, 2022. The seat became vacant after incumbent Republican representative Tom Reed resigned on May 10, 2022.

== Candidates ==
=== Republican Party ===
==== Nominee ====
- Joe Sempolinski, chairman of the Steuben County Republican Committee

==== Declined ====
- George Borrello, state senator from the 57th district
- Marc Cenedella, CEO of Ladders, Inc. and former candidate for this seat in the regular election
- Mike Sigler, Tompkins County legislator

==== Did not run ====
- Nick Langworthy, Chair of the New York Republican State Committee, former chair of the Erie County Republican Party, and nominee for this seat in the regular election
- Carl Paladino, former member of the Buffalo Public Schools Board, millionaire developer, nominee for Governor of New York in 2010, and candidate for this seat in the regular election primary

=== Democratic Party ===
==== Nominee ====
- Max Della Pia, U.S. Air Force veteran, community leader, and Chair of the Tioga County Democratic Committee; also the candidate for this seat in the 2022 general election

=== Others ===
- Rich Moon, pharmacist, unsuccessfully sought Republican nomination and ran as a write-in candidate

== Endorsements ==
Joe Sempolinski (R)

U.S. Representatives

- Tom Reed, U.S. Representative from New York's 23rd congressional district (2010–2022)

Organizations

- New York Federation of College Republicans
Max Della Pia (D)

State officials

- Tom DiNapoli, 54th New York State Comptroller (2007–present)
- Kathy Hochul, 57th governor of New York (2021–present)

Organizations

- NYSUT
- NYS AFL-CIO
- Public Employees Federation
- United Auto Workers

Publications

- The Buffalo News
- The Post-Journal/The Dunkirk Observer

== General election ==
=== Predictions ===
| Source | Ranking | As of |
|---|---|---|
| The Cook Political Report | Solid R | August 23, 2022 |
| Inside Elections | Solid R | July 21, 2022 |
| Sabato's Crystal Ball | Safe R | May 11, 2022 |

=== Fundraising ===
Campaign finance reports as of August 3, 2022
| Candidate | Amount raised | Amount spent | Cash on hand |
|---|---|---|---|
| Max Della Pia (D) | $160,139 | $114,600 | $47,709 |
| Joe Sempolinski (R) | $224,933 | $89,705 | $135,228 |
Source: OpenSecrets

=== Results ===
2022 New York's 23rd congressional district special election
| Party | Candidate | Votes | % | ±% |
|---|---|---|---|---|
| Republican | Joe Sempolinski | 33,452 | 45.84% | –5.73 |
| Conservative | Joe Sempolinski | 5,297 | 7.26% | +2.32 |
| Total | Joe Sempolinski | 38,749 | 53.10% | –4.60 |
| Democratic | Max Della Pia | 30,238 | 41.44% | +4.46 |
| Working Families | Max Della Pia | 3,763 | 5.16% | +1.03 |
| Total | Max Della Pia | 34,001 | 46.60% | +5.49 |
| Write-in | | 218 | 0.30% | N/A |
| Total votes | | 72,968 | 100.00% | |
| Turnout | | 73,331 | 17.43% | |
| Registered electors | | 420,632 | | |
| Republican hold | | | | |

By county

| County | Joe Sempolinski Republican | | Max Della Pia Democratic | | Write-in | | Margin | | Total votes | Turnout |
| County | # | % | # | % | # | % | # | % | Total votes | Turnout |
|---|---|---|---|---|---|---|---|---|---|---|
| Allegany | 3,812 | 73.32 | 1,370 | 26.35 | 17 | 0.33 | 2,442 | 46.97 | 5,199 | 19.80 |
| Cattaraugus | 4,813 | 67.65 | 2,273 | 31.95 | 29 | 0.41 | 2,540 | 35.70 | 7,115 | 15.34 |
| Chautauqua | 8,039 | 59.35 | 5,413 | 39.96 | 93 | 0.69 | 2,626 | 19.39 | 13,545 | 17.24 |
| Chemung | 4,681 | 58.78 | 3,267 | 41.03 | 15 | 0.19 | 1,414 | 17.76 | 7,963 | 15.46 |
| Ontario (part) | 2,366 | 56.93 | 1,782 | 42.88 | 8 | 0.19 | 584 | 14.05 | 4,156 | 14.97 |
| Schuyler | 1,267 | 53.35 | 1,105 | 46.53 | 3 | 0.13 | 162 | 6.82 | 2,375 | 19.10 |
| Seneca | 1,710 | 56.55 | 1,311 | 43.35 | 3 | 0.10 | 399 | 13.19 | 3,021 | 14.74 |
| Steuben | 6,726 | 66.95 | 3,282 | 32.67 | 39 | 0.39 | 3,444 | 34.28 | 10,047 | 16.90 |
| Tioga (part) | 2,099 | 51.75 | 1,954 | 48.18 | 3 | 0.07 | 145 | 3.58 | 4,056 | 16.42 |
| Tompkins | 1,951 | 14.73 | 11,287 | 85.22 | 7 | 0.05 | -9,336 | -70.49 | 13,245 | 23.19 |
| Yates | 1,285 | 57.29 | 957 | 42.67 | 1 | 0.04 | 328 | 14.62 | 2,243 | 16.28 |
| Totals | 38,749 | 53.10 | 34,001 | 46.60 | 218 | 0.30 | 4,748 | 6.51 | 72,968 | 17.43 |

== See also ==
- 2022 United States House of Representatives elections
- 2022 United States elections
- 117th United States Congress
- List of special elections to the United States House of Representatives
