= Catharine Young (politician) =

American politician (born 1960)

Cathy Young
- Young (right) with Randy Kuhl

Member of the New York Senate from the 57th district
- In office May 11, 2005 – March 10, 2019
- Preceded by: Patricia McGee
- Succeeded by: George Borrello

Member of the New York State Assembly from the 149th district
- In office January 1, 1999 – May 10, 2005
- Preceded by: Patricia McGee
- Succeeded by: Joseph Giglio

Personal details
- Born: November 22, 1960 (age 65) Livingston County, New York, U.S.
- Party: Republican
- Spouse: Richard
- Children: 3
- Education: State University of New York, Fredonia; St. Bonaventure University (BA)
- Website: Official website

Catharine M. Young (born November 22, 1960) is an American politician. From May 2005 to March 2019, Young represented New York State's 57th district in the New York State Senate. The district includes all of Chautauqua County, Cattaraugus County and Allegany County, as well as seven towns in Livingston County.

Prior to serving as Senator, Young represented New York's 149th State Assembly district from 1999 to 2005. She is a member of the Republican Party.

== Early life and education ==
A Livingston County native, Young grew up on a farm. She attended State University of New York at Fredonia, where she met her future husband, Richard. Following a transfer, she graduated magna cum laude with a bachelor's degree in mass communication from St. Bonaventure University.

== Early political career ==
Young was elected to the Cattaraugus County Legislature in 1995.

Young first ran for New York State Assembly in 1998. Following the death of Republican New York State Senator Jess Present in August 1998, Republican Assemblymember Patricia McGee was elected to the New York Senate. By March 1999, Young was serving as the assemblymember for McGee's former district, the 149th Assembly District. Running on the Republican and Conservative Party lines, Young defeated her Democratic opponent, Patrick Tyler, by a margin of 19,337 votes to 12,045 votes. Young served in the Assembly from 1999 to 2005.

== New York Senate ==
After Sen. Patricia McGee died in office in 2005, Young was nominated to replace her. In a May 2005 special election, Young defeated Democrat Nancy Bargar, 29,559 votes to 12,800 votes.

Rarely facing more than token opposition in subsequent campaigns, Young was unopposed in 2006 and won 78 percent of the vote against 2008 challenger Christopher Schaeffer. Mentioned as a potential candidate in 2010 to run against Eric Massa for New York's 29th congressional district, she stated that although the opportunity was "very tempting," her seat had to be retained in order to help Senate Republicans retake control of the chamber. According to Young, maintaining her Senate seat would give Upstate New York more of a voice in state government.

Young has chaired the Agriculture Committee and the state’s Rural Resources Commission as well as the Senate Republican Campaign Committee. In 2016, Young was named Chair of the Senate Finance Committee; she was the first woman to hold that position.

After losing 14-9 in a November 2018 attempt to oust incumbent Senate Republican Leader John J. Flanagan and being replaced as chair of the Senate Republican Campaign Committee in December 2018, Young announced on February 28, 2019 that she was resigning from the Senate effective March 10, 2019. Young indicated that she would begin work as Executive Director for the Center of Excellence in Food and Agriculture at Cornell University's AgriTech campus in Geneva, New York on March 11, 2019.

=== Political positions ===
==== Social issues ====
On December 2, 2009, Young voted against same-sex marriage legislation that failed to pass the Senate. She again voted against allowing same-sex marriage in New York during the senate roll-call vote on the Marriage Equality Act when it came before the Senate on June 24, 2011; the bill narrowly passed nonetheless in a 33-29 vote.

Young voted in favor of the State Senate's version of the Women's Equality Act in June 2013, which did not include the State Assembly's provisions for expanding abortion rights.

===== Support for areas declared disasters =====
In 2014, Young was recognized for helping to achieve the award of $700,000 in compensation monies from the Federal Emergency Management Agency (FEMA) for Gowanda, New York as a result of the devastating flood that occurred there in 2009. In 2009, a flash flood devastated the village, causing two deaths. Four feet of flood waters swept through the village, and caused much damage. The village was declared both a state and federal disaster site.

Of the anticipated disbursement of FEMA monies to Gowanda, New York due to the 2009 flood damage experienced there, Young is quoted, stating in the January 31, 2014 edition of Dunkirk's Observer:

Our people suffered a great deal of hardship and heartache because of the devastating 2009 flood, and they should not have to shoulder the heavy financial burden of repairing the village's basic infrastructure. This release of long overdue FEMA dollars not only helps to heal these wounds, but it allows the village to move forward towards a brighter future. I commend Governor Cuomo and everyone who worked together to cut through bureaucratic red tape so that this progress finally could be made. It has a very positive effect on many lives.

== See also ==
- 2009 New York State Senate leadership crisis

New York State Assembly
Preceded by Patricia McGee	Member of the New York Assembly from the 149th district 1999–2005	Succeeded by Joseph Giglio
New York State Senate
Preceded by Patricia McGee	Member of the New York Senate from the 57th district 2005–2019	Succeeded by George Borrello
