= Henry Barnett =

Henry Barnett may refer to:

- Henry Barnett (banker) (1815–1896), English MP
- Henry W. Barnett (1927–1994), member of the New York State Assembly
- Henry Walter Barnett (1862–1934), Australian photographer and filmmaker
- Henry J. M. Barnett (1922–2016), Canadian medical researcher
