= New York's 148th State Assembly district =

American legislative district

Assemblymember
Joe Sempolinski; R–Canisteo

New York's 148th State Assembly district is one of the 150 districts in the New York State Assembly. It has been represented by former Congressman Joe Sempolinski since 2025, succeeding Joseph Giglio.

== Geography ==
District 148 contains all of Allegany and Cattaraugus counties and portions of Steuben County.

The district is entirely within New York's 23rd congressional district, and overlaps the 57th and 58th districts of the New York State Senate.

== Recent election results ==
=== 2026 ===
2026 New York State Assembly election, District 148
Party	Candidate	Votes	%
Republican	Joe Sempolinski		
Conservative	Joe Sempolinski		
Total	Joe Sempolinski (incumbent)		
Write-in			
Total votes			

=== 2024 ===
2024 New York State Assembly election, District 148
Party	Candidate	Votes	%
Republican	Joe Sempolinski	33,902	
Conservative	Joe Sempolinski	4,045	
Total	Joe Sempolinski	37,947	70.8
Democratic	Daniel Brown	15,618	29.2
Write-in		14	0.0
Total votes		53,579	100.0
Republican hold			

=== 2022 ===
2022 New York State Assembly election, District 148
Party	Candidate	Votes	%
Republican	Joseph Giglio	31,371	
Conservative	Joseph Giglio	4,694	
Total	Joseph Giglio (incumbent)	36,065	99.8
Write-in		75	0.2
Total votes		36,140	100.0
Republican hold			

=== 2020 ===
2020 New York State Assembly election, District 148
Party	Candidate	Votes	%
Republican	Joseph Giglio	35,509	
Conservative	Joseph Giglio	3,533	
Independence	Joseph Giglio	922	
Total	Joseph Giglio (incumbent)	39,964	74.1
Democratic	W. Ross Scott	14,004	25.9
Write-in		9	0.0
Total votes		53,977	100.0
Republican hold			

=== 2018 ===
2018 New York State Assembly election, District 148
Party	Candidate	Votes	%
Republican	Joseph Giglio	27,728	
Conservative	Joseph Giglio	3,358	
Independence	Joseph Giglio	2,488	
Total	Joseph Giglio (incumbent)	33,574	99.7
Write-in		99	0.3
Total votes		33,673	100.0
Republican hold			

=== 2016 ===
2016 New York State Assembly election, District 148
Party	Candidate	Votes	%
Republican	Joseph Giglio	33,096	
Conservative	Joseph Giglio	4,377	
Independence	Joseph Giglio	2,889	
Reform	Joseph Giglio	359	
Total	Joseph Giglio (incumbent)	40,721	99.8
Write-in		88	0.2
Total votes		40,809	100.0
Republican hold			

=== 2014 ===
2014 New York State Assembly election, District 148
Party	Candidate	Votes	%
Republican	Joseph Giglio	21,263	
Conservative	Joseph Giglio	3,449	
Independence	Joseph Giglio	2,422	
Total	Joseph Giglio (incumbent)	27,134	99.8
Write-in		42	0.2
Total votes		27,176	100.0
Republican hold			

=== 2012 ===
2012 New York State Assembly election, District 148
Party	Candidate	Votes	%
Republican	Joseph Giglio	24,334	
Conservative	Joseph Giglio	3,105	
Independence	Joseph Giglio	1,434	
Total	Joseph Giglio	28,873	64.9
Democratic	Daniel Brown	13,904	
Working Families	Daniel Brown	1,732	
Total	Daniel Brown	15,636	35.1
Write-in		18	0.2
Total votes		44,527	100.0
Republican hold			
