= Hillary Hoffower =

Hillary Hoffower is an American journalist. She currently serves as a success editor for Fortune and a former senior reporter and correspondent for Business Insider. She covers the typical lifestyles and economics of members of the millennial generation and generation Z, among other topics. She currently resides in New York City.

== Early life ==
Hillary attended Punta Gorda Middle School and Charlotte High School in Punta Gorda, Florida, from which she graduated in 2010. She proceeded to achieve a Bachelor of Science in Public Relations with a minor in English and concentration in psychology from the University of Florida. She was part of Kappa Alpha Theta while attending the university.

== Journalism career ==
While at the University of Florida, Hillary served as an intern for Colin Cowie Lifestyle. From 2014 to 2018, she was employed by Boat International Media as an associate editor for Dockwalk. She joined Business Insider in 2018, serving as a senior reporter and correspondent until 2022 when she left to become an editor for Fortune. She also contributes to WeddingWire, TheLadders.com, and Career Contessa, In addition to her work covering living, working, and spending habits of millennials and GenZ, Hillary has covered the New York City economy, analyzed the lifestyles of the affluent, written about personal finance, and discussed fashion and wedding planning.
