= List of March for Our Lives locations (2022) =

List of US gun-violence protests in 2022

This is an incomplete list of March for Our Lives events that took place on June 11, 2022.

== United States ==
Listed below are over 400 locations in the U.S. with scheduled events in support of the March for Our Lives on or around Saturday, June 11, 2022.

- AL
- AK
- AZ
- AR
- CA
- CO
- CT
- DC
- DE
- FL
- GA
- HI
- ID
- IL
- IN
- IA
- KS
- KY
- LA
- ME
- MD
- MA
- MI
- MN
- MS
- MO
- MT
- NE
- NV
- NH
- NJ
- NM
- NY
- NC
- ND
- OH
- OK
- OR
- PA
- RI
- SC
- SD
- TN
- TX
- UT
- VT
- VA
- WA
- WV
- WI
- WY

State	Cities	Photo	Approximate attendance	Notes
Washington, D.C.			40,000	National Mall, near the Washington Monument; organizers planned for as many as 50,000. Scheduled speakers included March for Our Lives co-founders and Parkland survivors X González and David Hogg, DC Mayor Muriel Bowser, US Rep. Cori Bush (D-MO), AFT President Randi Weingarten, Yolanda Renee King, granddaughter of the Rev. Dr. Martin Luther King Jr, and Garnell Whitfield, son of a Buffalo shooting victim and a retired Buffalo fire commissioner.
Alabama	Birmingham		150-200	Kelly Ingram Park
Alabama	Foley		30	Foley Heritage Park
Alabama	Huntsville		30+	rally and march held at Big Spring Park
Alabama	Montgomery		40	Alabama State Capitol
Alaska	Eagle River		4	Eagle River Town Square
Alaska	Soldotna		25	sidewalk in front of Soldotna Creek Park, on Sterling Hwy
Arizona	Flagstaff		30+	lawn of Flagstaff City Hall
Arizona	Payson		8	parking lot fronting MobileT/The Beverage Place, E State Highway 260
Arizona	Phoenix		3,000 - 5,000	Hundreds gathered outside the Arizona State Capitol (in 114-degree heat), then marched through the streets. State Rep. Jennifer Longdon made an appearance in support of the event. Less than a dozen counter-protesters were also present.
Arizona	Prescott		150+	Mile High Middle School - Yavapai County Courthouse Plaza; state Sen. Martin Quezada spoke at the event.
Arizona	Sedona		22	candlelight vigil held at Jack Jamesen Memorial Park; US Rep. Tom O'Halleran was present.
Arizona	Tucson		hundreds	A rally was held at Armory Park, ending with a candlelight vigil to honor victims of gun violence, including those lost in Tucson on January 8.
Arkansas	Little Rock		200	Arkansas State Capitol; attendees included state Sen. Clarke Tucker, state Reps. Fred Love and Andrew Collins, state Senate candidate David Barber and gubernatorial nominee Chris Jones.
California	Anaheim		500	Pearson Park - Anaheim City Hall
California	Arcata		~65	Arcata Plaza (grassy knoll) - Arcata Playhouse
California	Auburn		100+	Auburn Courthouse, Maple St
California	Benicia		300	Benicia Green, corner of First & B Streets - march up and down First Street
California	Burbank		300+	Chandler Bike Path - W Chandler Blvd & N Mariposa St; US Rep. Adam Schiff and Burbank Mayor Jess Talamentes both spoke at the rally and participated in the march.
California	Burlingame		hundreds	A rally was held at Burlingame City Hall, followed by a march down Burlingame Ave.
California	Carpinteria		60	corner of Linden Ave & Carpinteria Ave
California	Culver City		40+	Veterans Memorial Park, corner of Culver Blvd & Overland Ave. Culver City Mayor Daniel Lee and council member Yasmine-Imani McMorrin spoke at the event.
California	Encinitas		100+	Moonlight Beach
California	Encino		200	Hundreds marched around and rallied at all four corners of Ventura Blvd & Hayvenhurst Ave.
California	Fresno		100+	River Park, SE Corner of Nees and Blackstone
California	Fullerton		50+	Hillcrest Park, 1200 N Harbor Blvd
California	Grass Valley		dozens	Grass Valley Veterans Memorial Building, 255 South Auburn St
California	Hesperia			event planned outside US Rep. Jay Obernolte's Hesperia office, 7th Ave
California	Idyllwild		20+	Flagpole in town center
California	La Cañada Flintridge		150	La Cañada Memorial Park; state Sen. Anthony Portantino spoke at the rally.
California	Laguna Beach		80+	rally held at Main Beach Park, S Coast Hwy; state Sen. Dave Min addressed the crowd.
California	Long Beach		300	Harvey Milk Promenade Park - Gov. George Deukmejian Courthouse
California	Los Angeles		thousands	The rally took place in Grand Park, followed by a march on surface streets around LA City Hall. A second LA event took place at UCLA around the Bruin Bear Statue at Westwood Plaza.
California	Manhattan Beach		200	Manhattan Beach Pier - Hermosa Beach Pier. Speakers included Assemblymember Al Muratsuchi. One counter-protester briefly interrupted the rally before being escorted away.
California	Monterey		couple hundred	Window on the Bay
California	Mountain View		250+	Gateway Park, W El Camino Real
California	Nevada City			event planned at Broad Street Bridge
California	Oakland		700	Frank H. Ogawa Plaza
California	Ojai		40-60	Libbey Park Entrance, Ojai Ave
California	Pacifica		100+	Linda Mar Beach parking lot - Rockaway Beach Trail
California	Palm Springs		60+	Frances Stevens Park; Palm Springs Mayor Lisa Middleton and congressional candidate Will Rollins spoke to the crowd. Event hosted by the Desert Stonewall Democrats.
California	Palmdale			event planned at Rancho Vista Blvd & 10th St West, 39605 10th St W
California	Pasadena		few hundred	Pasadena City College - march downtown
California	Redlands		200	Ed Hales Park, 5th & North St - march downtown; US Rep. candidate Derek Marshall attended the event.
California	Redwood City		100+	Redwood City Public Library - march downtown. San Carlos Mayor Sara McDowell spoke at the rally.
California	Riverside		350	Galleria Mall at Tyler
California	Sacramento		hundreds	(6/2) student walkout outside McClatchy Senior High School; (6/11) event planned, but cancelled due to extreme heat.
California	San Clemente			event planned at San Clemente Public Library, 243 Avenida Del Mar
California	San Diego		hundreds	A rally and march was held outside the San Diego County administration building; US Rep. Scott Peters spoke at the rally. In City Heights, dozens honored victims at Jeremy Henwood Memorial Park.
California	San Francisco		hundreds	San Francisco City Hall
California	San Jose			event planned at San Jose City Hall
California	San Leandro			event and march planned at Root Park, 1033 E 14th Street (but later changed to Oakland)
California	San Luis Obispo			event planned
California	San Marcos			event planned at CA-78
California	Santa Ana		60+	Centennial Regional Park
California	Santa Clarita		40-60	Valencia Blvd and Magic Mountain Parkway
California	Santa Cruz		120	Santa Cruz Clock Tower - Pacific Ave; the rally and march went ahead peacefully, in spite of (and unbeknownst to participants) the fact that organizers had failed to get a march permit in time and officially cancelled the event.
California	Santa Maria		50	One Community Action office, East Fesler St - Santa Maria City Hall
California	Santa Monica		70-100	Aero Theater, Montana Ave - Santa Monica State Beach
California	Sonoma		100	Sonoma Plaza
California	Tehachapi		50	corner of Tucker Rd (Hwy 202) & Valley Blvd; a few pro-gun activists also showed up.
California	Temecula		TBD	event held at Temecula Duck Pond, Ynez And Rancho California
California	Thousand Oaks		300	Marchers headed up Thousand Oaks Boulevard from Westlake Promenade to Thousand Oaks Civic Arts Plaza. US Rep Julia Brownley greeted the participants.
California	Ventura		0	event originally planned at Ventura City Hall, but later merged with Thousand Oaks & Westlake Village
California	Visalia		32	Memorial Park, 107 N Hall St - march down Main St to Church St
California	Walnut Creek		175+	Civic Park; US Rep Eric Swalwell spoke to the crowd.
California	Woodland Hills		80-100	Warner Park, Topanga Canyon Blvd
California	Yucca Valley		11	Morongo Basin MFOL; event held at NE corner of Old Woman Springs Road & Twentynine Palms Highway (Hwys 247 & 62)
Colorado	Colorado Springs		200	People gathered outside US Rep. Doug Lamborn's 5th congressional district office on Kelly Johnson Blvd.
Colorado	Cortez		25	corner of Montezuma Ave & Market St.
Colorado	Denver		hundreds	Civic Center Park; in addition to multiple speakers, including State Sen. Tammy Story and US Rep. Diana DeGette, there was an 11-minute moment of silence for the victims of the recent Uvalde, Texas, school shooting.
Colorado	Durango		100	People marched from Durango High School parking lot on Main Ave to Durango Public Library, whence a forum was held with three Democratic candidates (Adam Frisch, Sol Sandoval & Alex Walker) running for Colorado's 3rd Congressional District primary.
Colorado	Edwards		dozens	Edwards main roundabout, Edwards Access Blvd
Colorado	Fort Collins		400+	Old Town Square
Colorado	Glenwood Springs		60	Sayer Park - Centennial Park
Colorado	Grand Junction		few dozen	Old Mesa County Courthouse Lawn, & 6th Rood Ave
Colorado	Longmont		200+	Hundreds marched down Main St to Longmont Civic Center at 3rd Ave and Kimbark St; participants and speakers included Longmont Mayor Joan Peck, state Rep. Karen McCormick and state Sen. Sonya Jaquez Lewis.
Colorado	Pueblo		30-50	Dozens gathered along U.S. 50 and Elizabeth St, outside the Old Northside Kmart parking lot, to advocate for gun reform.
Colorado	Parker		5	Fika Coffee House
Colorado	Ridgway		50	Hartwell Park - Ridgway Town Park, Lena St
Colorado	Steamboat Springs		28	Routt County Courthouse lawn
Connecticut	Hartford		hundreds	Bushnell Park; US Sen. Richard Blumenthal and Lt. Gov. Susan Bysiewicz spoke at the rally.
Connecticut	Litchfield		15	Litchfield High School
Connecticut	New Haven			(event planned)
Connecticut	Newtown		400	Hundreds gathered outside Newtown Middle School; speakers included teenagers Jessica Eisele and Ashley Hubner, town residents and survivors of the 2012 Sandy Hook School shooting. The group then marched onto Main St and headed down to the National Shooting Sports Foundation building, where they were greeted by US Sen. Richard Blumenthal.
Connecticut	Salisbury		300	Salisbury Town Green, in front of the White Hart Inn, Rtes 41 & 44 - library
Connecticut	Stamford		several dozen	Mill River Park; Stamford Mayor Caroline Simmons spoke at the rally.
Connecticut	Torrington		6	Torrington City Hall
Connecticut	Westport		85+ (total)	(6/8) Stand Up Against Gun Violence march, organized by the group Westport Moms, was held along Main St (50+ people); (6/11) A few dozen people marched from Jesup Green to the Ruth Steinkraus Cohen Bridge
Delaware	(online)			(6/2) The Delaware State Education Association held a "Virtual Vigil for School Safety" on a Thursday night
Florida	Babcock Ranch			event planned at Babcock Ranch Founders Square (Punta Gorda)
Florida	Boynton Beach			event planned at 7675 Trapani Lane
Florida	Bradenton		60 - 70	Riverwalk Splash Park - Manatee County courthouse; event organized by Women's Voices of Southwest Florida
Florida	Coral Gables		200-300	Coral Gables City Hall; Miami-Dade County Mayor Daniella Levine Cava spoke at the rally.
Florida	Flagler Beach		60	Demosntrators lined up along the west side of State Road 100, outside Wadsworth Park.
Florida	Fort Myers		400+	Old Lee County Courthouse, Main St - march downtown
Florida	Gainesville		300	Bo Diddley Plaza - Depot Park
Florida	Inverness		15	Citrus County Courthouse, U.S. 41
Florida	Jacksonville			event planned on Jacksonville beaches
Florida	Jensen Beach / Stuart		60-100	Roosevelt Bridge, Federal Hwy
Florida	Key West		at least 5	A rally was held at Bayview Park, along Truman Ave; state Rep candidate Adam Gentle was present.
Florida	Largo			event planned at 601 Starkey Rd
Florida	Leesburg			event planned at US-441 in front of Lake-Sumter College
Florida	Melbourne		300	Hundreds showed up for a rally and march at West Melbourne Community Park.
Florida	Ocala		10	intersection of Silver Springs Blvd (State 40) and Pine Ave (US Route 441)
Florida	Orlando		thousands	Orlando City Hall - Lake Eola. Speakers included state Reps. Anna Eskamani & Carlos Guillermo Smith, and Orlando's incoming police chief Eric Smith.
Florida	Palmetto Bay			event planned at Coral Reef Park
Florida	Parkland		1,500	Pine Trails Park Amphitheater
Florida	Pensacola		150	Dozens gathered at Plaza Ferdinand VII, then marched downtown along Palafox St.
Florida	Port Orange		100-125	corner of U.S. 1 & Dunlawton Ave.
Florida	Sarasota		100+	Hart's Landing - John Ringling Causeway Bridge
Florida	Sebring			event planned at Democratic Headquarters, Sebring Pkwy
Florida	St. Augustine		100+	In spite of rain, dozens showed up at the lawn of Castillo de San Marcos.
Florida	St. Petersburg		several hundred	Hundreds gathered and marched at North Straub Park; event hosted by the Women's Advocacy Movement of Pinellas (WAMP). Local elected officials and political candidates were invited to the event, but not allowed to speak, only listen.
Florida	Tallahassee		60-75	Florida State Capitol Building
Florida	Tampa		hundreds	George E. Edgecomb Courthouse - march down E. Twiggs St to Curtis Hixon Waterfront Park
Florida	Weston		hundreds	Weston Regional Park
(Georgia (U.S. state)) Georgia	Athens		30	Athens City Hall
(Georgia (U.S. state)) Georgia	Atlanta		1,000+	Ebenezer Baptist Church - Edgewood Ave - Woodruff Park; US Reps Nikema Williams & Lucy McBath took part in the march.
(Georgia (U.S. state)) Georgia	Augusta		100+	People lined both sides of Walton Way Extension, outside the Unitarian Universalist Church.
(Georgia (U.S. state)) Georgia	Columbus		80	Dozens gathered at the Mall on Broadway, 11th St & Bwy; 2 counter-protesters also showed up.
(Georgia (U.S. state)) Georgia	Gainesville		~125	protest held at Gainesville Square
(Georgia (U.S. state)) Georgia	Louisville		3	Jefferson Hospital, Peachtree St
(Georgia (U.S. state)) Georgia	Marietta		200	Marietta Square
(Georgia (U.S. state)) Georgia	Savannah		100-150	A rally was held at Daffin Park, focusing not only on gun control but also reproductive rights and voting rights. Governor hopeful Stacey Abrams made a surprise appearance, alongside Savannah Mayor Van Johnson.
(Georgia (U.S. state)) Georgia	Snellville		few dozen	Snellville Towne Green, Main St. East
Hawaii	Honolulu		30+	Waikiki Post Office - march downtown
Hawaii	Lihue		10+	Kauai Community College Entrance
Idaho	Boise		500	Hundreds gathered for a rally at the Idaho State Capitol, while across the street, 60-100 counter-protesters stood in Cecil D. Andrus Park.
Idaho	Ketchum		100	Ketchum Town Square - march downtown
Idaho	Lewiston		50	A vigil was held at Brackenbury Square, Main St; a handful of pro-gun-rights counterprotesters also turned out.
Illinois	Bloomington		75	McLean County Museum of History
Illinois	Charleston		60+	Coles County Courthouse (north side), 651 Jackson Ave
Illinois	Chicago		1,000	Federal Plaza; speakers included state Rep. Denyse Wang Stoneback and U.S. Rep. Marie Newman.
Illinois	Crystal Lake		50+	corner of Exchange Drive & Northwest Highway; US Rep. Bill Foster spoke to the crowd.
Illinois	DeKalb		nearly 200	Band Shell at Hopkins Park - march north up Sycamore Road to Greenwood Acres Drive and back
Illinois	Downers Grove		200-300	Hundreds turned out at Downers Grove North High School parking lot for a rally and march downtown. US Rep. Sean Casten spoke at the event.
Illinois	Elgin		100+	corner of Kimball Street and Grove Avenue
Illinois	Highland Park		150 - 500	Sunset Woods Park - march through downtown. Three weeks later, the city suffered its own mass shooting during an Independence Day parade, with seven people killed and at least 38 injured.
Illinois	Naperville		25	(5/28) Statue by the YMCA - Central Park, S Washington St
Illinois	Palatine		hundreds	Margreth Riemer Reservoir
Illinois	Springfield		hundreds	Old State Capitol
Illinois	St. Charles		80-100	A rally and march was held at Lincoln Park; state Representative candidate Arad Boxenbaum addressed the crowd.
Indiana	Bloomington		100 - 250	Monroe County Courthouse - march along Kirkwood Ave
Indiana	Columbus		200	Columbus City Hall, Washington St
Indiana	Evansville			event planned
Indiana	Fort Wayne		45	Allen County Courthouse
Indiana	Indianapolis		few hundred	Tarkington Park - Indiana Governor's Mansion; state Sens. J.D. Ford & Fady Qaddoura were in attendance.
Indiana	Lafayette		65-75	Tippecanoe County Courthouse - farmer's market
Indiana	South Bend		350	Morris Performing Arts Center, John R. Hunt Plaza - South Bend courthouse; state Rep. Maureen Bauer was present.
Iowa	Ames		50	Tom Evans Plaza - Bandshell Park / Dog-Eared Books, Main St
Iowa	Cedar Rapids		150	Greene Square Park - downtown march
Iowa	Davenport		hundreds	Vander Veer Botanical Park
Iowa	Des Moines		hundreds	(6/10) Central Library, Cowles Commons - People's Plaza outside Iowa State Capitol
Iowa	Indianola			event planned by Indivisible Warren County at Moats Park
Iowa	Iowa City		35	(6/13) College Green Park, University of Iowa - The Pentacrest
Iowa	Sioux City		50+	Woodbury County Courthouse - Public Museum
Iowa	Storm Lake		dozens	march around Storm Lake Elementary School
Kansas	Wichita		200	Dozens gathered at Old Town Square. Interim Wichita Police Chief Lem Moore spoke at the rally.
Kentucky	Bowling Green		4	event held at Warren County Justice Center
Kentucky	Frankfort		150+	People held a rally on the front steps of the Kentucky State Capitol.
Kentucky	Lexington		40-50	(6/3) Fayette County Courthouse
Kentucky	Louisville		hundreds	Hundreds gathered at Louisville Metro Hall, then marched along Jefferson Ave to Dr. Martin Luther King Jr. Plaza, corner of 6th & Chestnut Streets (location of Sen. Mitch McConnell's office). Participants in the march included Louisville Mayor Greg Fischer, US Rep. John Yarmuth, US Senate candidate Charles Booker and mayoral candidate Craig Greenberg (who months earlier had survived an assassination attempt during his campaign). Hours after the event, five teenagers were injured in a shooting near the Big Four Bridge in Louisville.
Louisiana	Baton Rouge		25	Louisiana State Capitol
Louisiana	Eunice		50-75	A family of a slain man, Donovan Reed, began their 2nd Annual Gun Violence Walk and Vigil, starting at the downtown location where he was murdered in 2021, and heading to Eunice City Hall. Eunice Mayor Scott Fontenot lent his support.
Louisiana	New Orleans		120+	"Peace Up Guns Down" rally and procession held at Treme Recreation Center
Maine	Belfast		100+	Post Office Square, Franklin St
Maine	Blue Hill		75	Blue Hill Town Hall, front lawn
Maine	Bucksport		dozens	Veterans Memorial Park (Pine St) & Eastern Channel Bridge
Maine	Falmouth		TBD	Maine Gun Giveback 2022; event held at Falmouth Maine Police Department and led by the Maine Gun Safety Coalition. Ten city police departments across the state of Maine participated.
Maine	Farmington		10	rally held along Main St, outside Hippach Field
Maine	Machias			event planned at Bad Little Falls Bridge
Maine	North Berwick		17	North Berwick Center & Town Hall
Maine	Portland		1,000+	Hundreds gathered at Lincoln Park (Congress St & Pearl St), then marched through the Old Port before arriving at Portland City Hall.
Maine	Rockland		100	Chapman Park, Park & Main Streets - march downtown; Speakers included state Reps. Vicki Doudera and Rep. Ann Matlack.
Maine	Scarborough			event planned at Memorial Park
Maryland	Annapolis		200+	rally held at The People's Park; speakers included Andrea Chamblee, widow of late Capital Gazette journalist John McNamara, who was killed in a June 2018 mass shooting.
Maryland	Baltimore		50+	Pierce's Park - McKeldin Plaza - Baltimore City Hall; former US Secretary of Education and candidate for Governor of Maryland John King Jr. spoke to the crowd.
Maryland	Chestertown		100+	County building, 400 High St - Wilmer Park; former Republican US congressman (& current Democrat) Wayne Gilchrest spoke at the event.
Maryland	Cumberland		23	Allegany County Courthouse on Washington St - City Hall Park
Maryland	Ocean City		15-20	People stood along Rte 50 at West Ocean City Park 'n Ride.
Maryland	Reisterstown		60	Franklin High School - Franklin Middle School
Massachusetts	Amherst		~16	Kendrick Park, N Pleasant St
Massachusetts	Andover		30+	Shawsheen Square; state Rep. Tram Nguyen attended the rally.
Massachusetts	Boston		thousands	Christopher Columbus Waterfront Park (North End); Mayor of Salem, MA Kim Driscoll (whose city cancelled their MFOL event) attended the Boston rally.
Massachusetts	Greenfield		110	(6/9) On Thursday, dozens of Four Rivers Charter Public School students staged a walkout, heading west to the adjacent Greenfield Community College campus, to protest gun violence. Meanwhile, the official "March for Our Lives – Anti Gun Violence Rally," scheduled for Saturday June 11 at noon on the Greenfield Town Common, was canceled so as not to conflict with the Franklin County Pride March.
Massachusetts	Haverhill		dozens	Whites Corner, intersection of Water & Main Sts, in front of Market Basket; candidate for Massachusetts Attorney General Quentin Palfrey attended the rally.
Massachusetts	Ipswich		dozens	Ipswich Center Green
Massachusetts	Longmeadow		50+	Bay Path University - Longmeadow Town Green
Massachusetts	Nantucket		45+	Nantucket Methodist Church
Massachusetts	Northampton		several hundred	(5/31) On Tuesday afternoon, over half the student body at Northampton High School walked out their classrooms and gathered outside the building's front doors for an after-school protest against gun violence.
Massachusetts	Salem		few dozen+	(6/1) Salem Teachers Union held a city-wide peaceful protest of nation-wide gun violence in schools; a few dozen faculty at Collins Middle School banded together outdoors and entered their building en-masse.
Massachusetts	Wareham		200	People lined Route 6 in front of Wareham Memorial Town Hall; 21 empty chairs sat on the town hall lawn to honor the students and teachers killed in Uvalde, TX.
Michigan	Ann Arbor		400+	The Diag, University of Michigan; US Rep. Debbie Dingell spoke at the event.
Michigan	Cassopolis		5	Clisbee Park, N Broadway & School St (near St. Ann Catholic Church) - beach pavilion
Michigan	Dearborn Heights		~20	(6/10) community candlelight vigil held at Islamic House of Wisdom
Michigan	Detroit		500+	Detroit Cities Riverfront; speakers included US Reps Andy Levin & Rashida Tlaib, and State Sens. Stephanie Chang & Rosemary Bayer.
Michigan	Farmington Hills		50+	Nardin Park United Methodist Church
Michigan	Grand Haven		100-120	Central Park
Michigan	Grand Rapids		50+	(6/18) Veteran's Memorial Park; US Rep. candidate Hillary Scholten attended the event.
Michigan	Lansing		500	Hundreds gathered at the Michigan State Capitol; among the speakers were Gov. Gretchen Whitmer, US Sen. Debbie Stabenow, Atty Gen. Dana Nessel, US Rep Elissa Slotkin and Lansing Mayor Andy Schor.
Michigan	Oxford		400 - 600	Centennial Park, S Washington St - Oxford High School; rally and march planned by No Future Without Today, a group of students of said school, where a gunman killed four people and injured seven back in November 2021. Michigan Atty Gen. Dana Nessel appeared at the rally for support.
Michigan	Port Huron		50	Pine Grove Park - Port Huron City Hall & Municipal Office Center; rally organized by St. Clair County Democratic Party
Michigan	St. Joseph		100	People stood outside Rep. Fred Upton's St. Joseph office on Main St.
Michigan	Traverse City		300	Grandview Parkway and Union Street, 3840 Blueberry Ln
Michigan	Waterford		12	Civic Center Pond
Minnesota	Albert Lea		dozens	Freeborn County Courthouse, S Broadway Ave
Minnesota	Brainerd		60+	Gregory Park - historic water tower at N 6th & Washington Sts
Minnesota	Grand Marais		25	Grand Marais Harbor Park, W Wisconsin St
Minnesota	Minneapolis		500	intersection of 12th & Washington Aves - Minneapolis City Hall
Minnesota	Rochester		200	Peace Plaza, 1st Ave SW - Olmsted County Government Center
Minnesota	St. Cloud		75	Stearns County Courthouse and Jail
Minnesota	St. Peter		30	Gault Park Pavilion
Mississippi	Jackson		80	Mississippi State Capitol
Mississippi	Oxford		75	Oxford City Hall, Oxford City Square
Mississippi	Tupelo		20+	Fairpark - Gateway Park
Missouri	Kansas City		350	Hundreds gathered at Gillham Park; Kansas City Mayor Quinton Lucas spoke at the rally.
Missouri	Rolla		50	Phelps County Courthouse, N Main St - Rolla City Hall; a few Democratic candidates for office, including event hosts Randi McCallian (US Rep), Bernadette Holzer (state Rep) and Tara Anura (state Senate) spoke at the rally.
Missouri	Springfield		30	(6/10) Park Central Square
Missouri	St. Joseph		25+	(6/12) prayer vigil at Civic Center Park
Missouri	St. Louis		300 - 600	Kiener Plaza - march down Market St in downtown St. Louis
Montana	Kalispell			event planned at Depot Park
Montana	Missoula		70+	People gathered at Missoula County Courthouse on W Broadway St (in the rain).
Montana	Whitefish		7	Armory Park - Depot Park
Nebraska	Chadron		6	Chadron Middle School, 6th & Ann Sts - Dawes County Courthouse lawn
Nebraska	Kearney		30	Harmon Park - march to Walgreens via 5th Ave and Hwy 30
Nebraska	Lincoln		70+	(6/4) Nebraska State Capitol; state Sen. Adam Morfeld spoke at the rally.
Nebraska	Omaha		300+	A rally was held at Memorial Park; state Senator and candidate for Nebraska's 2nd congressional district Tony Vargas addressed the crowd. After the rally, people walked down to Dodge St to hold up signs.
Nevada	Las Vegas		100	rally held at Sunset Park, E Sunset Rd
Nevada	Reno		80	Reno City Plaza
New Hampshire	Littleton		100	Walgreens Intersection (Rt. 302 & Dells Rd)
New Hampshire	Nashua		250+	Soldiers and Sailors Monument - Greeley Park; US Sen. Maggie Hassan and state Rep. Laura Telerski (D-Hillsborough) were among the speakers.
New Jersey	Asbury Park		30	Springwood Park (formerly Sunset Park); the rally and march got under way but ultimately had to be rescheduled for June 30 (for proper paperwork to be filed).
New Jersey	Atlantic City		60	Atlantic City Boardwalk
New Jersey	Hackensack		80-100	Bergen County Courthouse; US Rep. Josh Gottheimer and US Sen. Bob Menendez spoke at the rally.
New Jersey	Hackettstown		100+	rally and march launched at Hackettstown High School
New Jersey	Jersey City		46	(6/12) Pedestrian Mall, Newark Ave - Journal Square
New Jersey	Montclair			(6/3) St. James Church (front lawn), Valley Rd
New Jersey	Newark		hundreds	A rally was held at Military Park, followed by a march down Broad Street; speakers included Montclair, NJ Mayor Sean Spiller, US Sen. Bob Menendez, state Senate Majority Leader Teresa Ruiz and US Rep. Donald Payne Jr.
New Jersey	Ocean City		hundreds	Ocean City Boardwalk, Stenton Place & 23rd Street - Welcome Center via 9th St Bridge
New Jersey	Princeton		350	Hinds Plaza, Witherspoon Street; US Rep. Bonnie Watson Coleman spoke at the rally.
New Jersey	Ramsey			event planned at Ramsey Municipal Building, N Central Ave
New Jersey	Roselle		100+	Warinanco Park; former state Sen. Raymond Lesniak and former assemblyman Jamel Holley spoke at the rally.
New Jersey	Sewell		0	(6/25) event planned at Washington Towmnship Park, Hurffville Crosskeys Rd (but canceled)
New Jersey	Somerville		300	Somerset County Courthouse
New Jersey	Springfield / Union		120+	Springfield Town Hall, Mountain Ave - Union High School Football Field, Morris Ave. US Rep. Tom Malinowski spoke at the rally in Springfield; respective Mayors Alex Keiser and Manny Figueiredo carried a banner in the march to the latter's town, where both of them spoke along with other elected officials.
New Jersey	Toms River		100	Huddy Park
New Mexico	Albuquerque		TBD	Due to extenuating circumstances, the official Saturday event planned for Civic Plaza was canceled several weeks in advance. However, New Mexicans to Prevent Gun Violence hosted a buyback event, "Guns to Gardens," at Mesa Presbyterian Church, where 240 firearms were donated, cut apart and repurposed as garden tools.
New Mexico	Clovis			march planned: Greene Acres Lake - Main Street - Clovis-Carver Public Library parking lot
New Mexico	Farmington		13	Orchard Plaza Park, Main St and Orchard Ave
New Mexico	Roswell		36	Roswell Independent School District Administrative and Educational Services Complex, North Kentucky Ave - Pioneer Plaza, N Main St
New York	Albany		hundreds	West Capitol Park; Lt. Gov. Antonio Delgado spoke at the rally and joined the march. Other elected officials at the event were Albany Mayor Kathy Sheehan and US Rep. Paul Tonko.
New York	Beacon		dozens	rally held at Main St
New York	Buffalo		hundreds	People marched down Jefferson Avenue to the Tops Friendly supermarket where 10 people were killed on May 14th, stopped by the memorial site and gathered in a field to honor the victims.
New York	Corning		45	Corning-Painted Post High School - Centerway Square; US Rep. candidate Max Della Pia spoke at the rally.
New York	Cornwall		100	Riverlight Park - Bandstand at Hudson St & River Ave
New York	Elmira		few dozen	Riverside Elementary School - Brand Park. This rally mostly consisted of teachers who attended a previous rally in Corning, NY, plus one of said rally's speakers, US Rep. candidate Max Della Pia.
New York	Geneseo		200	Geneseo Village Park - march up and down Main St
New York	Great Neck		300	Jonathan L. Ielpi Firefighters Park, Grace Avenue & Park Place
New York	Ithaca		13	Ithaca Commons
New York	Mineola		several hundred	Nassau County Supreme Court - Nassau County Legislature Building, Franklin Ave
New York	New Paltz		20-30	TOPS shopping center plaza - march down Main St to a vigil at Elting Memorial Library & back; US Rep. candidate Pat Ryan attended the event.
New York	New York City		1,000	Cadman Park Plaza, Brooklyn - Brooklyn Bridge - Washington Square Park; participants included NYC Mayor Eric Adams & NY Atty Gen. Letitia James
New York	Norwich		7	event held at East Park, Broad St
New York	Peekskill		several hundred	A march took place around downtown, ending with a rally at the Senator Bernard G. Gordon Justice Building & Field Library.
New York	Port Jefferson Station			event planned at Resistance Corner, 12
New York	Potsdam		200	Ives Park - Potsdam Post Office, Elm Street; US House candidate Matt Castelli attended the event.
New York	Saranac Lake		150+	Riverside Park
New York	Saratoga Springs		60-70	Congress Park, 268 Broadway - march downtown
New York	Saugerties		100+	Cantine Field, Pavilion St - downtown Saugerties (Washington Ave, Main St & Market St)
New York	Southampton		80	Southampton Town Hall - Southampton High School
New York	Syracuse		400	Everson Museum of Art - James M. Hanley Federal Building
New York	Utica		40-50	DeSales Center, Genesee St - state office building; event hosted by Indivisible Mohawk Valley
New York	Wellsville		100+	Island Park - Fassett Greenspace Project, Main Street
North Carolina	Asheville		100+	Pack Square, outside Asheville Museum - march downtown, past Pritchard Park
North Carolina	Charlotte		200+	(6/12) First Ward Park - First United Methodist Church. Speakers included US Rep. Alma Adams and state Sen. Jeff Jackson.
North Carolina	Elizabeth City			(6/10) Friday night prayer vigil at Waterfront Park
North Carolina	Greenville		75	Pitt County Courthouse
North Carolina	Raleigh		hundreds	Halifax Mall; state Reps. Marcia Morey and Julie von Haefen spoke at the rally.
North Carolina	Roxboro		50	Merritt Commons
North Carolina	Salisbury		125+	(6/12) Rowan County Government Administrative Offices, W Innes St - Bell Tower Green park
North Carolina	Southport		300+	Franklin Square Park; event held by Southport NC Indivisible
North Carolina	Weaverville		50-60	Clock on Main Street, near Weaverville Public Parking
North Carolina	Wilmington		200+	Innes Park - Bottega Art & Wine, 723 N. 4th Street
North Carolina	Winston-Salem			(6/12) event planned outside Chatham Building, 305 4th St NW
North Dakota	Fargo		hundreds	Trinity Lutheran Church, 7th St South, Moorhead, MN - downtown Fargo
Ohio	Akron		200	(6/8) 150 people marched from John S. Knight Center to Family of Faith United Methodist Church; (6/11) A rally of 50 was held outside Highland Square Branch Library.
Ohio	Chillicothe		40	Ross County Courthouse
Ohio	Cincinnati		hundreds	Cincinnati City Hall, Plum St - march downtown.
Ohio	Cleveland		hundreds	A rally for both gun legislation and reproductive rights was held on the steps of Cleveland City Hall at Willard Park, followed by a march downtown. Cleveland Mayor Justin Bibb, state Sen. Nickie Antonio and former state Sen. Nina Turner were among the speakers at the event.
Ohio	Columbus		hundreds	Ohio State House
Ohio	Dayton		300+	Courthouse Square, N Main St - march downtown Dayton
Ohio	Marietta		25+	First Unitarian Church at Third St - Putnam St - First Congregational Church at Front St
Ohio	Sandusky		50+	Mylander Park, Columbus Ave - Washington Park. Civil rights activist and Ohio House District 89 candidate Jim Obergefell participated.
Ohio	Sylvania		dozens	Flower Hospital, Harroun Rd - City Courthouse
Ohio	Toledo		hundreds	intersection of Erie and Adams Streets - One Government Center
Ohio	Wooster		60	Cornerstone Elementary School
Ohio	Xenia		20	Greene County Democratic Party Headquarters
Oklahoma	Oklahoma City		hundreds	A rally and march was held around the Oklahoma State Capitol, 10 days after a man killed four people at a Tulsa medical center before turning the gun on himself. Speakers included state Rep. Jacob Rosecrants, US Rep. & candidate for Senate Kendra Horn and US Congressional candidate Joshua Harris-Till.
Oregon	Albany			event planned at Linn County Courthouse (MFOL Calapooia, OR)
Oregon	Ashland		hundreds	Ashland Plaza, E. Main St. Students partnered with Oregon Indivisible, Women's March Southern Oregon and Veterans for Peace for the event.
Oregon	Beaverton		60+	Beaverton City Hall - march downtown. The day before the march, an event was held outside City Hall with state House Speaker and Democratic gubernatorial candidate Tina Kotek calling for gun violence prevention in Oregon. Advocates in attendance included state Rep. Lisa Reynolds and Beaverton Mayor Lacey Beaty, who later participated in Saturday's march.
Oregon	Bend		hundreds	Drake Park - march along NW Riverside Boulevard through downtown
Oregon	Coos Bay		11	Coos Bay Boardwalk
Oregon	Corvallis			march planned: Benton County Courthouse - Riverfront
Oregon	Eugene		300	Despite rain, hundreds rallied at Eugene Municipal Court on Lincoln St before marching downtown. Speakers included Oregon House Majority leader Julie Fahey and state Sen. Floyd Prozanski.
Oregon	Florence		dozen	event held at corner of Highway 101 & 126, outside Dunes Village Center
Oregon	Grants Pass		80-100	Josephine County Courthouse
Oregon	Hood River		45	Salmon Fountain, Overlook Memorial Park
Oregon	Lincoln City			event planned at "D" River Wayside, D River & Hwy 101
Oregon	Portland		thousands	Portland State University Urban Plaza - center of SW 4th Ave - Portland City Hall - Pioneer Courthouse Square
Oregon	Salem		200+	(6/12) Oregon State Capitol
Oregon	Sherwood		30	Sherwood Cannery Square - Sherwood Plaza; state Rep. & US House candidate Andrea Salinas attended the event.
Pennsylvania	Beaver		100	(6/9) Beaver County Courthouse
Pennsylvania	Bethlehem		1,000	Hundreds gathered at Payrow Plaza, East Church St; speakers included Mayor of Bethlehem J. William Reynolds and US Rep. Susan Wild. Roughly two dozen Second Amendment activists stood on the corner of West Church St before the rally.
Pennsylvania	Bloomsburg		50+	Columbia County Courthouse - Rosemont Cemetery - Market St. Square. Standing at a distance from the rally were two counter-protesters, one of them holding an AR-15 style rifle.
Pennsylvania	Erie		100	Griswold Park
Pennsylvania	Greensburg		8	St. Clair Park, N Maple Ave
Pennsylvania	King of Prussia		150-250	A "silent" march was launched at the intersection of DeKalb Pike (202) & Henderson Road.
Pennsylvania	Mercer		35	Mercer County Courthouse
Pennsylvania	Philadelphia		200	Wyalusing Park - march down 52nd St. Protesters renewed their push for gun control following a string of mass shootings around the country, including one on South Street on June 4 that had left 3 people dead and 11 others injured by gunfire.
Pennsylvania	Pittsburgh		250+	Rally held at Flagstaff Hill, Schenley Park; one of the speakers was Miri Rabinowitz, whose husband Dr. Jerry Rabinowitz was killed in the 2018 Tree of Life Synagogue shooting massacre.
Pennsylvania	Scranton		100+	Action Together NEPA and other local organizations held a march from Steamtown Mall (across from the State Building) to the Lackawanna County courthouse; white carnations were laid on the steps to honor victims of gun violence. Scranton Mayor Paige Cognetti was present for the rally.
Pennsylvania	West Chester		300	Historic Chester County Courthouse, N High St; state Rep. candidate Chris Pielli attended the event.
Pennsylvania	Wilkes-Barre		50+	Public Square - Luzerne County Courthouse. Speakers included state Rep. Eddie Day Pashinski.
Rhode Island	Providence		400+	Hundreds of people (mostly high school and college students) gathered outside the Rhode Island State House. State Rep. David Cicilline attended the rally.
South Carolina	Columbia		200 - 300	SC Capitol Building - Main St sidewalk
South Carolina	Greenville		100+	One City Plaza, N Main St - North Main St to Peace Center
South Carolina	Myrtle Beach		70+	Market Commons Grand Park
South Dakota			0	No events re gun violence or gun legislation planned for June 2022 in South Dakota.
Tennessee	Bristol		40-50	Bristol TN/VA sign
Tennessee	Chattanooga		300	Miller Park, Market St - march downtown; state Rep. Yusuf Hakeem addressed the rally.
Tennessee	Clarksville		46	Montgomery County Courthouse - 2 Millenium Plaza
Tennessee	Jackson		50-60	Jackson City Hall Building; candidate for Governor J.B. Smiley spoke at the rally.
Tennessee	Knoxville		hundreds	Krutch Park - march downtown; scheduled speakers included Knoxville Mayor Indya Kincannon and US Rep. Gloria Johnson.
Tennessee	Memphis		100+	Robert R. Church Park - National Civil Rights Museum
Tennessee	Nashville		1,500+	Hundreds gathered at Public Square Park, outside Nashville City Hall, and marched to Legislative Plaza, near the Tennessee State Capitol. Several gun owners dressed in tactical gear also showed up.
Texas	Alpine		15-25	rally held at gazebo near Brewster County Courthouse
Texas	Amarillo		100+	rally held at Amarillo Independent School District (AISD) Education Support Center, W Interstate 40
Texas	Austin		several hundred	Texas State Capitol
Texas	Dallas		500	Dealey Plaza - Dallas City Hall
Texas	El Paso		50-70	San Jacinto Plaza
Texas	Fort Worth		hundreds	Tarrant County Courthouse, E Weatherford St; a few counter-protesters showed up.
Texas	Frisco		300	Several hundred gathered at Simpson Plaza, outside George A. Purefoy Municipal Center & Frisco City Hall, then marched north on Coleman Blvd, turning right on Main and heading to the northeast corner of Main & Frisco Streets.
Texas	Houston		600	Hundreds gathered at Houston City Hall; speakers included Houston Mayor Sylvester Turner. People then marched downtown to US Sen. Ted Cruz's office.
Texas	Killeen		15	A discussion on gun safety and gun control was held at Killeen Community Center Park; a group of counter-protesters stood across the street with their own views.
Texas	Longview		40+	Heritage Plaza - march downtown (past Gregg County Courthouse)
Texas	Lubbock		40+	Frank Higinbotham Park, 19th Street & Vicksburg Ave
Texas	Marfa		two dozen	Presidio County Courthouse - march down Highland Ave to USO Building
Texas	Pharr		7	Pharr City Hall, S Cage Blvd
Texas	Rockwall		60	Rockwall County Historic Courthouse, corner of Goliad & E Yellowjacket Lane
Texas	San Antonio		500	Milam Park - San Antonio City Hall
Texas	Weslaco			McAllen Moms Demand Action Meet and Greet event planned at Weslaco Public Library
Texas	Wichita Falls			event planned at Wichita County Courthouse
Texas	Woodlands		200+	Northshore Park, Lake Woodlands Dr - Northshore Bridge
Utah	Salt Lake City		200	West High School - Utah State Capital
Utah	St. George		50	town square - march up Main Street to St. George Boulevard
Vermont	Bennington		40	Vigil for Peace held at Four Corners
Vermont	Manchester Center		70+	A rally was held at the rotary intersection at Main & Depot Sts. State Reps. Seth Bongartz & Kathleen James were present.
Vermont	Montpelier		hundreds	Vermont State House; rally speakers included US Rep. Peter Welch, Burlington Mayor Miro Weinberger, Lt Gov. Molly Gray and Vermont Senate President Pro-Tempore Becca Balint.
Virginia	Blacksburg		200	VA Tech Campus, 135 College Ave
Virginia	Charlottesville		12	University of Virginia; due to planning issues, protest organizers had to cancel the "official" march intended for hundreds of people, but some people still wanted to get out on the streets and express their thoughts.
Virginia	Fredericksburg		30+	corner of William St. and Blue and Grey Parkway/Route 3
Virginia	Front Royal		two dozen	Main Street gazebo
Virginia	Gainesville		50	Atlas Walk Way - Linton Hall Road - Virginia Gateway shopping center
Virginia	Harrisonburg		50	Virginia Democrat Headquarters - Court Square; Harrisonburg Mayor Deanna Reed and congressional candidate Jennifer Lewis (6th district) spoke at the rally.
Virginia	Norfolk		20	World Trade Center, W Main St
Virginia	Richmond		60-100	intersection of Monument Ave & N Arthur Ashe Blvd (former site of Stonewall Jackson Monument).
Virginia	Staunton		30	Augusta County Courthouse
Virginia	Sterling		hundreds	Cascades Stone House at Potomac Lakes Pool - Cascades Pkwy - Potomac Falls High School
Virginia	Virginia Beach		70	City Hall / Virginia Beach Municipal Center
Washington	Bainbridge Island			event planned at Seabold Hall on Komedal Rd NE
Washington	Bellingham		couple hundred	Bellingham City Hall; state Reps. Alicia Rule, Sharon Shewmake and Alex Ramel spoke at the event.
Washington	Bothell		7	Bothell Way NE
Washington	Bremerton			event planned at east end of the Manette Bridge
Washington	Everett		300+	Snohomish County Plaza, Rockefeller Ave - march downtown; US Rep. Rick Larsen spoke at the rally.
Washington	Lake Forest Park		20+	(6/12) Brookside Elementary School - Lake Forest Park Elementary
Washington	Longview			event planned at Civic Circle
Washington	Moses Lake		dozen	Penhallurick's True Value parking lot, N Stratford Rd - Library
Washington	Olympia		750	Tivoli Fountain Walkway - Washington State Capitol
Washington	Port Townsend		TBD	People of all ages gathered and marched downtown on Water Street.
Washington	Redmond		300	Redmond City Hall; state Reps. David Hackney, Liz Berry & Tana Senn spoke at the event.
Washington	Renton		60-100	rally held at Logan Ave N and 10th St N, near Renton Landing
Washington	Richland		200	Howard Amon Park
Washington	Seattle		70	An NAACP anti-gun violence event (not connected with March for Our Lives) was held at Marther Luther King, Jr. Memorial Park.
Washington	Sequim		200	Washington St & Sequim Ave intersection - 4th & 5th Aves
Washington	Spokane		hundreds	Riverfront Park Clock Tower
Washington	Tacoma			event planned at Wright Park
Washington	Vancouver		few hundred	Waterfront Park - Esther Short Park
Washington	Walla Walla		125	(6/6) student walkout at Walla Walla High School, outside Blue Devil Building
Washington	Woodinville			(event planned)
West Virginia	Charleston		60	West Virginia State Capitol
Wisconsin	Eau Claire		150	Randall Park, Broadway St - Eau Claire City Hall
Wisconsin	Elkhorn		75+	Elkhorn Town Square
Wisconsin	Green Bay		60	Due to rain, the rally location was changed from Leicht Memorial Park to Tarlton Theatre, where dozens gathered inside for some speeches. People then marched outside (in the rain) down East Walnut St over Fox River towards the Brown County Courthouse.
Wisconsin	Madison		few hundred	Despite overcast skies and some rain, hundreds rallied outside the Wisconsin State Capitol, then marched down State Street to the Library Mall. After a moment of silence for victims of gun violence, there were a few more speeches and a march back to the Capitol Building.
Wisconsin	Milwaukee		several hundred	Hundreds marched from the Milwaukee County Courthouse on 9th Street to the Fiserv Forum in Deer District (where gun violence had taken place a month earlier after a Celtics-Bucks game).
Wisconsin	Minocqua		50	Minocqua Veterans Park, corner of Front St & Oneida St - march to Torpy Park (in the rain)
Wyoming	Jackson		hundreds	(6/6) Jackson Hole High School (student walkout)
