= Patricia McGee =

American politician

Patricia K. "Pat" McGee
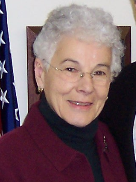

Member of the New York State Senate
- In office January 1, 1999 – April 2, 2005
- Preceded by: Jess J. Present
- Succeeded by: Catharine Young
- Constituency: 56th District (1999–2002); 57th District (2003–2005)

Member of the New York State Assembly from the 149th district
- In office June 17, 1987 – December 31, 1998
- Preceded by: Daniel B. Walsh
- Succeeded by: Catharine Young

Personal details
- Born: October 12, 1934 Cattaraugus County, New York, U.S.
- Died: April 2, 2005 (aged 70) Kenmore, New York, U.S.
- Party: Republican
- Other political affiliations: Conservative
- Spouse: Maurice "Mike" McGee
- Website: "SenatorMcGee.com". Archived from the original on April 10, 2005.

Patricia K. "Pat" McGee (October 12, 1934 – April 2, 2005) was a longtime New York State Assemblywoman and Senator from Franklinville, New York.

== Political career ==
McGee was a registered Republican for her entire political career, and was frequently cross-endorsed by the Conservative Party of New York.

Prior to her foray into politics, McGee worked as a secretary and administrative assistant at Franklinville Central School and the Olean campus of Jamestown Community College.

McGee's political career began in 1978 as she was elected to the Cattaraugus County Legislature, where she served for 10 years, and served as that county's first female majority leader.

McGee was elected in 1987 in a special election to fill the 149th Assembly District seat caused by the resignation of longtime incumbent Daniel B. Walsh of Olean. Walsh had resigned in early 1987 to accept a policy position with the Business Council of New York State. In the assembly, McGee served on many committees. In 1998, she was tapped to replace Jess Present, who had recently died, in the New York State Senate. Moving to the Republican-dominated Senate led to McGee earning the title of chairperson on the Agriculture Committee, the Commission on Rural Resources and the Committee on Alcoholism and Drug Abuse, as well as serving prominently on numerous other committees. She was often seen as a conservative maverick; she was one of only seven Senate votes who opposed an increase in the state's minimum wage, on the principle that it would put her Southern Tier district at a competitive disadvantage with neighboring counties in Pennsylvania.

McGee was instrumental in helping her longtime associate in the State Senate, Randy Kuhl, get elected to Congress in 2004. Kuhl had served as state senator in a neighboring district to McGee's.

In addition to her legislative work, McGee was also a frequent columnist. Her columns, more than simply press releases, were published in the Cattaraugus County Chronicle and later on her own Web site.

== Death and legacy ==
On April 2, 2005, McGee died at Kenmore Mercy Hospital in Kenmore, New York due to pulmonary fibrosis.

To this day, McGee is seen in a high regard as a New York State politician, and her status in Cattaraugus County borders on legendary. The Pat McGee Trail, the cornerstone of Cattaraugus County's trail system built on 12 miles of abandoned railbed from Cattaraugus, New York to Salamanca, New York, bears her name.

McGee was succeeded in the State Senate by Catharine Young.

New York State Assembly
| Preceded by Daniel B. Walsh | New York State Assembly, 149th District; 1987–1998 | Succeeded by Catharine Young |
New York State Senate
| Preceded by Jess Present | New York State Senate, 56th District; 1999–2002 | Succeeded by Joseph Robach (redistricted) |
| Preceded by Byron Brown (redistricted) | New York State Senate, 57th District; 2003–2005 | Succeeded by Catharine Young |
Political offices
| Preceded by Nancy Larraine Hoffmann | Chairperson of the New York Senate Agricultural Committee; 2004–2005 | Succeeded by Catharine Young |
