= John B. Daly (New York politician) =

American politician

Member of the New York State Senate
- In office 1979-1995
- Preceded by: Lloyd H. Paterson
- Succeeded by: George D. Maziarz
- Constituency: 16th district (1976-1982); 60th district (1979-1982); 61st district (1983-1995)

Member of the New York State Assembly from the 138th District
- In office 1973-1978
- Preceded by: Richard J. Hogan
- Succeeded by: Joseph T. Pillittere

Personal details
- Born: April 29, 1929 New York City
- Died: April 3, 1999 (aged 69) Lewiston, NY
- Party: Republican
- Spouse: Catherine McHugh
- Education: Fordham University; Harvard Business School

Military service
- Branch/service: U.S. Army
- Rank: First lieutenant
- Battles/wars: Korean War

John B. Daly (April 29, 1929 – April 3, 1999) was an American politician from New York who served 22 years in the New York State Legislature and two as Department of Transportation commissioner.

== Early life and career ==
He was born on April 29, 1929, to Irish immigrants in Woodside, Queens, right outside of New York City. He attended school in New York and graduated with a B.A. from Fordham University. Daly later took courses at the University of Iowa and Harvard Business School. He served as a first lieutenant in the U.S. Army until 1955.

After serving in the Army, Daly moved to Niagara Falls in 1955 to work for the Kimberly-Clark Corporation. He later joined the Carborundum Corporation as director of PR in 1962.

== Political career ==
He entered politics as a Republican, and was a member of the City Council of Niagara Falls from 1960 to 1964. Afterwards he moved to nearby Lewiston, New York.

He was a member of the New York State Assembly from 1973 to 1978, sitting in the 180th, 181st and 182nd New York State Legislatures. He then became a member of the New York State Senate from 1979 to 1995, sitting in the 183rd, 184th, 185th, 186th, 187th, 188th, 189th, 190th and 191st New York State Legislatures.

Daly became the first representative of New York's 61st District on January 1, 1983, during the 185th New York State Legislature when the district was created due to the elimination of five Congressional seats across New York. As a member of the New York State Senate in 1991, Daly was on a bipartisan committee convened by Gov. Mario M. Cuomo where Republicans were in favor of instituting a photo identification system for recipients of Medicaid programs in order to cut down on fraud and abuse.

In January 1995, he was appointed as Commissioner of the New York State Department of Transportation by then Gov. George Pataki.

In February 1997, he was appointed to the New York Public Service Commission and served as deputy chairman until the time of his death.

=== Criticisms ===
In 1992, The New York Times wrote about Daly's use of taxpayer dollars to produce a 15-minute television show in one of the New York State Legislature's three film studios. The show featured videos of Daly in action that appeared to promote his conservative legislative agenda and was transmitted to the public-access station in Daly's district. The Times raised questions about the cost and advantages inherent in being an incumbent politician highlighting that in 1990, 98.9% of incumbent legislators won re-election where they ran. At the time, Daly was a seven-term State Legislator.

== Personal life ==
Daly married Catherine McHugh, and they had three children, Robert, Martin and Catherine Daly. His son, Robert, also became an assemblyman for the 138th District. John B. Daly died on April 3, 1999, at his home after a long illness.

=== Honors ===
The "John B. Daly Boulevard" in Niagara County is named after Daly.

New York State Assembly
| Preceded by Richard J. Hogan | New York State Assembly; 138th District; 1973–1978 | Succeeded by Joseph T. Pillittere |
New York State Senate
| Preceded by Lloyd H. Paterson | New York State Senate; 60th District; 1979–1982 | Succeeded by Walter J. Floss Jr. |
| Preceded by new district | New York State Senate; 61st District; 1983–1995 | Succeeded by George D. Maziarz |
