= Raymond M. Kisor =

American politician

Member of the New York State Assembly from the 98th district
- In office January 1, 1979 – December 31, 1982
- Preceded by: Jean Amatucci
- Succeeded by: Richard I. Coombe

Personal details
- Born: December 20, 1930 (age 95)
- Party: Republican

Raymond M. Kisor (December 20, 1930 – November 20, 2025) is an American politician who served in the New York State Assembly from the 98th district from 1979 to 1982.
