= Rolland E. Kidder =

American politician and author

Member of the New York State Assembly from the 150th district
- In office January 8, 1975 – December 31, 1982
- Preceded by: John W. Beckman
- Succeeded by: William Parment

Personal details
- Born: September 14, 1940 (age 86) Jamestown, New York, US
- Party: Democratic
- Education: Houghton College; SUNY Buffalo
- Profession: Author

Rolland E. Kidder is an American politician and author from New York State.

Born in Jamestown, New York, Kidder served in the United States Navy during the Vietnam War. Kidder graduated from Houghton College and SUNY Buffalo Law School. He later served on the American Battle Monuments Commission and the National World War II Memorial Design Committee.

A Democrat, Kidder served four terms in the New York State Assembly, serving in the 181st, 182nd, 183rd, and 184th New York State Legislatures from January 8, 1975, to December 31, 1982.

New York State Assembly
Preceded by John W. Beckman	New York State Assembly; 150th District; 1975–1982	Succeeded by William Parment
