= Joseph R. Pisani =

New York lawyer and politician (1929–2016)

Member of the New York State Senate from the 36th district
- In office January 3, 1973 – June 24, 1984
- Preceded by: Bernard G. Gordon
- Succeeded by: Suzi Oppenheimer

Member of the New York State Assembly from the 91st district
- In office January 4, 1967 – December 31, 1972
- Succeeded by: Richard E. Mannix

Member of the New York State Assembly from the 100th district
- In office January 5, 1966 – December 31, 1966
- Preceded by: District created
- Succeeded by: Clarence D. Lane

Personal details
- Born: August 31, 1929 New Rochelle, New York, U.S.
- Died: May 4, 2016 (aged 86) West Park, New York, U.S.
- Party: Democratic

Joseph R. Pisani (August 31, 1929 – May 4, 2016) was an American lawyer and politician from New York.

== Life ==
He was born on August 31, 1929, in New Rochelle, Westchester County, New York. There he attended the public schools. He graduated B.A. from Iona College in 1950, and J.D. from Fordham Law School in 1953. He was admitted to the bar in 1954, and practiced law in New Rochelle. He married Joan, and they had four children.

Pisani also entered politics as a Republican, and was a member of the New York State Assembly from 1966 to 1972, sitting in the 176th, 177th, 178th and 179th New York State Legislatures.

He was a member of the New York State Senate from 1973 to 1984, sitting in the 180th, 181st, 182nd, 183rd, 184th and 185th New York State Legislatures. In 1981, he ran for Westchester County Executive but was defeated by the incumbent Democrat Alfred DelBello.

On December 1, 1983, Pisani was indicted for fraud and tax evasion. On May 1, 1984, his trial opened in the United States District Court for the Southern District of New York. On June 1, the jury convicted him on eighteen counts, acquitted him on eleven, and was unable to reach a verdict on the remaining ten counts of the indictment. On June 27, he resigned his Senate seat. On August 1, 1984, he was fined $69,000, and sentenced to four years in jail, by Judge David N. Edelstein. On September 14, 1984, his law license was suspended.

In 1985, he worked as a window salesman in Newburgh and went to live in a log cabin in West Park. On September 12, 1985, a three-judge panel of the United States Court of Appeals for the Second Circuit (judges George C. Pratt, Jon O. Newman and Amalya L. Kearse) vacated most of his convictions and the four-years-in-prison sentence. The appeals court held that Pisani could not be convicted of diverting campaign funds to his personal use, because the law prohibiting this practice was enacted only after the facts of this case happened. The appeals court upheld a conviction and a suspended sentence for Pisani taking money from an escrow account of one of his clients.

On July 2, 1986, Pisani pleaded guilty to tax evasion, and on July 28, was sentenced by Judge John E. Sprizzo to one year in prison. On September 15, 1986, Pisani began to serve his prison term in the Federal Medical Center, Lexington. On February 17, 1987, he was disbarred by the Appellate Division. He was released from prison in February 1987, and was transferred to a halfway house in Manhattan. In March 1987, he failed a drug test after eating a poppyseed bagel, and was sent to the Metropolitan Correctional Center, New York.

After his release, he worked as a salesman again, this time for an assortment of construction materials. In October 1987, he married Kathryn Godfrey, his long-time mistress and law secretary. In January 1988, he started to host a radio talk show on WVOX. He also painted landscapes at his log cabin.

Pisani was reinstated to the bar in 2008.

New York State Assembly
Preceded by new district	New York State Assembly; 100th District; 1966	Succeeded by Clarence D. Lane
Preceded by Burton Hecht	New York State Assembly; 91st District; 1967–1972	Succeeded by Richard E. Mannix
New York State Senate
Preceded by Bernard G. Gordon	New York State Senate; 36th District; 1973–1984	Succeeded by Suzi Oppenheimer
