= Jean Amatucci =

American politician from New York

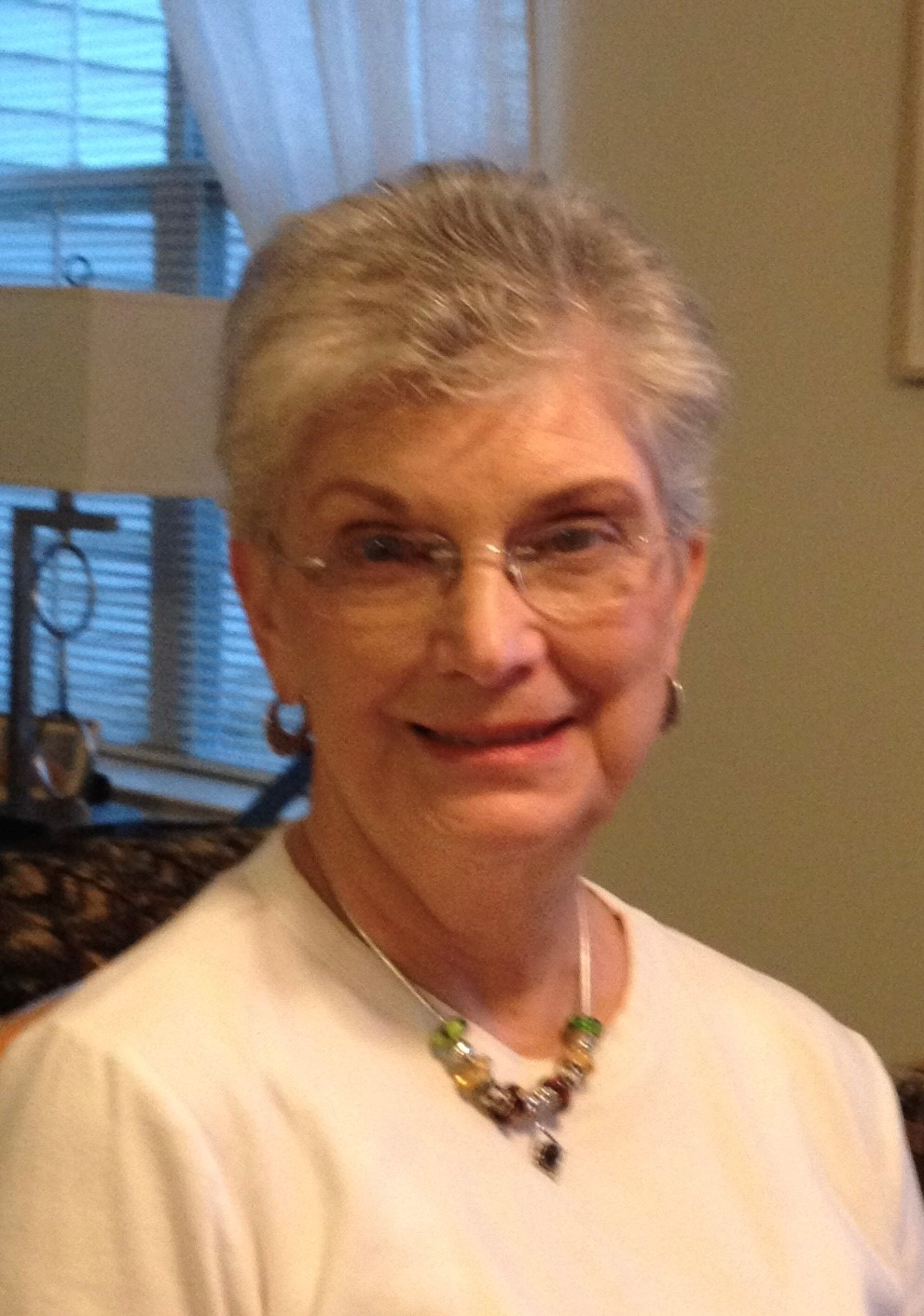
Jean Amatucci

Jean Amatucci Fox (born November 23, 1938) is an American politician from New York.

== Life ==
Jean Amatucci was born on November 23, 1938, the daughter of Daniel and Carmela Amatucci. Her father was a Democratic politician and was the Supervisor of the Town of Bethel who approved the Woodstock Festival and signed the permits allowing the same. She graduated from State University of New York at Plattsburgh's school nurse-teacher education program in 1960 and became a registered nurse. She lived in White Lake, Sullivan County, New York. She was Executive Director of the New York State School Nurse-Teachers Association and was active in several other nurses' professional organizations before her election to the State Assembly. She also owned Candy Cone, a soft serve ice cream business, in Bethel during the late 1960s and early 1970s.

She entered politics as a Democrat and was elected to the New York State Assembly in 1974, serving as a member of the New York State Assembly from 1975 through 1978, sitting in the 181st and 182nd New York State Legislatures. She served on the Assembly’s Aging, Agriculture, Child Care and Health Committees, and chaired the Assembly Subcommittee on Healthcare Delivery.

In November 1975, she married Mark Dennis Fox, an attorney and later a United States magistrate judge in the Southern District of New York. On March 14, 1978, their son Michael Louis Fox was born, making her the first woman state legislator in New York history to give birth while in office. In May 1978, she announced her retirement from the Assembly, to take effect at the end of that term, and said that she would take care of her infant son instead.

She was honored as Alumnus of the Year of SUNY Plattsburgh in 1976. She was a member of the College Council of SUNY Plattsburgh from 1976 to 1985.

She was appointed by Governor Mario Cuomo as Chairwoman of the New York State Temporary Commission on Lobbying.

In May 2024, former NYS Assemblymember Amatucci was named one of the 63 New York State Senate Women of Distinction for 2024 by nomination of NYS Sen. James Skoufis.

New York State Assembly
Preceded by Louis Ingrassia	New York State Assembly; 98th District; 1975–1978	Succeeded by Raymond M. Kisor
