= Richard E. Mannix =

American politician

Member of the New York State Assembly from the 91st district
- In office January 1, 1973 – December 31, 1976
- Preceded by: Joseph R. Pisani
- Succeeded by: Edward F.X. Ryan Jr.

Personal details
- Born: December 18, 1928 Boston, Massachusetts
- Died: July 11, 2011 (aged 82) Larchmont, New York
- Party: Republican

Richard E. Mannix (December 18, 1928 – July 11, 2011) was an American politician who served in the New York State Assembly from the 91st district from 1973 to 1976.

He died on July 11, 2011, in Larchmont, New York at age 82.
