= Bernard G. Gordon =

American politician

Bernard G. Gordon (November 16, 1916 – May 4, 1978) was an American lawyer and politician from New York.

== Life ==
He was born on November 16, 1916, in Peekskill, Westchester County, New York, the son of David Gordon (1885–1962) and Rose Gordon (1889–1977). He graduated from Syracuse University and Syracuse University College of Law. During World War II he was a United States naval aviator. He married Leila Sally Mencher, and they had one daughter. He practiced law in Peekskill, and entered politics as a Republican.

Gordon was a Deputy Secretary of State of New York from 1959 to 1960; a member of the New York State Assembly (Westchester Co., 6th D.) from 1961 to 1964, sitting in the 173rd and 174th New York State Legislatures; and a member of the New York State Senate from 1965 until his death in 1978, sitting in the 175th, 176th, 177th, 178th, 179th, 180th, 181st and 182nd New York State Legislatures. In the Senate he was the driving force behind the No-fault automobile insurance law enacted in 1973.

He died on May 4, 1978, at his home in Peekskill, New York, of cancer; and was buried at the First Hebrew Cemetery in Cortlandt Manor.

== Sources ==
New York State Assembly
Preceded by Theodore Hill, Jr.	New York State Assembly; Westchester County, 6th District; 1961–1964	Succeeded by Richard A. Cerosky
New York State Senate
Preceded by George W. Cornell	New York State Senate; 31st District; 1965	Succeeded by Basil A. Paterson
Preceded by Dalwin J. Niles	New York State Senate; 41st District; 1966	Succeeded by Dalwin J. Niles
Preceded by Abraham Bernstein	New York State Senate; 36th District; 1967–1972	Succeeded by Joseph R. Pisani
Preceded by Richard E. Schermerhorn	New York State Senate; 37th District; 1973–1978	Succeeded by Mary B. Goodhue
