= John W. Beckman =

American politician and attorney

Member of the New York State Assembly from the 150th district
- In office January 1, 1969 – December 31, 1974
- Preceded by: Jess J. Present
- Succeeded by: Rolland E. Kidder

Personal details
- Born: Jamestown, New York, US
- Party: Republican

John W. Beckman is an American politician and attorney from Westfield, New York. A Republican, he served three terms in the New York State Assembly, serving in the 178th, 179th, and 180th New York State Legislatures from January 1, 1969 to December 31, 1974.

In the election of 1970, he had the Republican and Conservative lines, and defeated Rolland E. Kidder. He had 20,735 votes on the Republican line, 2,112 votes on the Conservative line while Kidder had 17,328 votes on the Democratic line. In 1972, he defeated Fred J. Cusimano, who had the Democratic and Liberal nominations. Beckman had 30,917 votes on the Republican line, 1,753 on the Conservative line while Cusimano had 17,765 votes on the Democratic line and 561 votes on the Liberal line.

New York State Assembly
Preceded by Jess J. Present	New York State Assembly; 150th District; 1969–1974	Succeeded by Rolland E. Kidder
