= Joe Sempolinski =

American politician (born 1983)

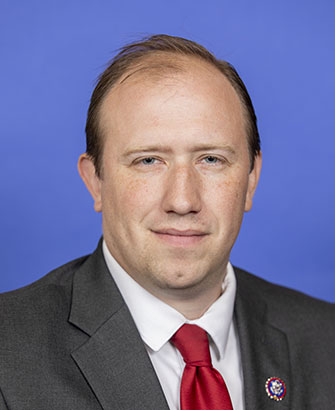
- Official portrait, 2022

Member of the New York State Assembly from the 148th district
- Incumbent
- Assumed office January 1, 2025
- Preceded by: Joseph Giglio

Member of the U.S. House of Representatives from New York's 23rd district
- In office August 23, 2022 – January 3, 2023 (Note: Sempolinski's official service begins on the date of the special election, while he was not sworn in until September 13, 2022.)
- Preceded by: Tom Reed
- Succeeded by: Nick Langworthy

Personal details
- Born: Joseph Michael Sempolinski; February 10, 1983 (age 43) Elmira, New York, U.S.
- Party: Republican
- Children: 2
- Education: Georgetown University (BA); Yale University (MA, MPhil)

Joseph Michael Sempolinski (born February 10, 1983) is an American politician who is a member of the New York State Assembly from the 148th district. He previously served as the U.S. representative for New York's 23rd congressional district from 2022 to 2023. A Republican, he was first elected in a special election held on August 23, 2022.

== Early life and education ==
Born in Elmira, New York, Sempolinski graduated from Corning-Painted Post West High School in Painted Post, New York. He earned a Bachelor of Arts degree from Georgetown University and a Master of Arts and Master of Philosophy from Yale University.

== Career ==
Between 2010 and 2015, Sempolinski worked in the office of Congressman Tom Reed, including as District Director. A member of the Republican Party, he also serves as the Chairman of the Steuben County Republican Committee. At the time he was selected to run for Congress in 2022 New York's 23rd congressional district special election, he was serving as Chief of Staff in the office of New York State Assemblyman Joseph Giglio.

== U.S. House of Representatives ==
=== Elections ===
On May 10, 2022, Reed resigned from the seat representing New York's 23rd congressional district, a seat to which he had already stated he would not stand for re-election past 2022, leaving a vacancy in the 117th United States Congress. The boundaries of the district were to be redrawn according to the 2020 United States Census. Though two Republican candidates emerged for the newly redrawn district, former Buffalo School Board member Carl Paladino and eventual primary winner Nick Langworthy, both lived outside the bounds of the 23rd district as drawn at the time and decided not to seek the seat in the special election; the Republican county chairmen from the district selected Sempolinski to run for the seat in the special election.

Sempolinski defeated Max Della Pia, the Democratic nominee, by a 53% to 47% margin. He won 10 out of the 11 counties in the district, while Della Pia overwhelmingly won Tompkins County.

=== Tenure ===
Sempolinski had pledged not to seek re-election in the November general election. He was sworn in immediately before Congress reconvened on September 13.

==== Committee assignments ====
On September 13, 2022, Sempolinski was assigned to the following committees:

- United States House Committee on the Budget
- United States House Committee on Education and Labor

== New York State Assembly ==
In February 2024, Sempolinski announced that he would run for the New York State Assembly in the 148th district in 2024, seeking to succeed state assemblyman Joseph Giglio, who employed Sempolinski as his chief of staff. Sempolinski defeated Democratic challenger Daniel Brown in the general election on November 5, 2024.

Sempolinski was named the Ranking Republican on the Assembly Committee on Mental Health and as a member of the Committees on Education, Environmental Conservation, Higher Education, Labor and People With Disabilities.

U.S. House of Representatives
Preceded by Tom Reed	Member of the U.S. House of Representatives from New York's 23rd congressional district 2022–2023	Succeeded by Nick Langworthy
U.S. order of precedence (ceremonial)
Preceded by Bob Turner as Former U.S. Representative	Order of precedence of the United States as Former U.S. Representative	Succeeded by George Santos as Former U.S. Representative
