= Joseph Giglio =

American politician (born 1954)

Member of the New York State Assembly
- In office June 28, 2005 – December 31, 2024
- Preceded by: Catharine Young
- Succeeded by: Joe Sempolinski
- Constituency: 149th district (2005–2012); 148th district (2013–present)

Personal details
- Born: Joseph Giglio; September 12, 1954 (age 72) Buffalo, New York, U.S.
- Party: Republican
- Spouse: Ann Marie
- Children: four
- Education: SUNY at Buffalo
- Profession: Politician
- Website: Official website

Joseph Giglio (born September 12, 1954) is an American politician, who served as a member of the New York State Assembly from 2005 through 2024. He first represented the 149th district from 2005 until 2012, before being redistricted to the 148th district in 2013.

== Early life and education ==
Giglio was born on September 12, 1954, in Buffalo, New York. He received an associate degree at Hilbert College and a bachelor's degree from the University at Buffalo.

== Political career ==
=== Early political career ===
Giglio served as a special assistant to then-New York State Attorney General Dennis Vacco, as an employee of the Cattaraugus County Sheriff's Department. Following this, Giglio served as Deputy Inspector General. As Deputy Inspector, he conducted investigations of alleged criminal activity, fraud, and abuse.

=== New York State Assembly ===
==== Elections ====
Giglio was elected to the New York State Assembly after defeating Cattaraugus County legislator Carmen Vecchiarella in a special election on June 28, 2005. He won re-election in 2006 over Cattaraugus County legislator Linda Witte and again in 2008 over Allegany County supervisor Patrick Eaton. He was re-elected again in 2010, defeating Travis Lecceadone.

==== Tenure ====
Giglio is the Chairman of the Assembly Minority Conference's Steering Committee.

Giglio's current committee assignments are as follows: Correction (Ranking Minority Member); Aging; Children and Families; Ethics and Guidance; and Codes. He was also selected to co-chair the Assembly Minority Statewide Forum on Workforce Issues in the Correctional System.

He has also been a member of the Medicaid Waste, Fraud and Abuse Task Force, the Agriculture, Tourism and Outdoor Recreation Task Force, and the Crime in our Communities Task Force.

== Personal life ==
Giglio is married to Ann Marie. Together, they have four children. They reside in the village town of Gowanda, New York.

== See also ==
- New York State Assembly

New York State Assembly
Preceded by Catharine M. Young	Member of the New York State Assembly from the 149th district July 2005 – December 31, 2012	Succeeded by Sean M. Ryan
Preceded by Raymond W. Walter	Member of the New York State Assembly from the 148th district January 1, 2013 – present	Incumbent
