= Lloyd H. Paterson =

American businessman and politician (1925–1988)

Member of the New York State Senate from the 60th district
- In office January 1, 1973 – December 31, 1978
- Preceded by: Earl Brydges (redistricting)
- Succeeded by: John B. Daly

Personal details
- Born: July 20, 1925 Niagara Falls, New York
- Died: December 1988 (aged 63)
- Party: Republican

Lloyd H. Paterson (July 20, 1925 – December 1988) was an American businessman and Republican politician from New York.

== Biography ==
Paterson was born on July 20, 1925, in Niagara Falls, New York. He attended Niagara University on a basketball scholarship, played several seasons with the Niagara Purple Eagles, and graduated in 1951. He attended Rochester Institute of Technology in 1956. He engaged in the insurance business. In 1957, he was hired to coach the NU freshmen basketball team.

He entered politics as a Republican, and was a member of the Board of Supervisors of Niagara County (Niagara Falls, 15th Ward) in 1958 and 1959. He was appointed as a Deputy Commissioner of the New York State Athletic Commission on May 21, 1959. He became Treasurer of Niagara County from 1965 to 1972.

When Majority Leader Earl Brydges announced his retirement, Paterson ran to succeed him. He won the five way primary and was a member of the New York State Senate from 1973 to 1978, sitting in the 180th, 181st and 182nd New York State Legislatures. He was indicted for grand larceny, having embezzled more than $68,000 from private estates for which he acted as public administrator while being Niagara County Treasurer. On August 7, 1978, he was fined $18,500 and placed on probation for five years.

He died in December 1988.

In 1989, he was inducted into the Niagara University Athletics Hall of Fame.

New York State Senate
| Preceded by new district | New York State Senate; 60th District; 1973–1978 | Succeeded by John B. Daly |
