= Clarence D. Lane =

American politician

Member of the New York State Assembly from the 102nd district
- In office January 1, 1973 – December 31, 1986
- Preceded by: Thomas W. Brown
- Succeeded by: John Faso

Member of the New York State Assembly from the 100th district
- In office January 1, 1967 – December 31, 1972
- Preceded by: Joseph R. Pisani
- Succeeded by: Benjamin P. Roosa Jr.

Member of the New York State Assembly from the 111th district
- In office January 1, 1966 – December 31, 1966
- Preceded by: District created
- Succeeded by: Donald L. Taylor

Member of the New York State Assembly from the Greene district
- In office January 1, 1963 – December 31, 1965
- Preceded by: William E. Brady
- Succeeded by: District abolished

Personal details
- Born: March 17, 1921 Ashland, Greene County, New York
- Died: December 7, 1998 (aged 77) Windham, New York
- Party: Republican

Clarence D. Lane (March 17, 1921 – December 7, 1998) was an American politician who served in the New York State Assembly from 1963 to 1986.
