= Sean P. Walsh =

American politician (born 1950)

Member of the New York State Assembly from the 82nd district
- In office November 1977 – December 31, 1982
- Preceded by: Thomas J. Culhane
- Succeeded by: Vincent A. Marchiselli

Personal details
- Born: February 24, 1950 (age 76) The Bronx, New York, U.S.
- Party: Democratic

Sean P. Walsh (born February 24, 1950) is an American politician who served in the New York State Assembly from the 82nd district from 1977 to 1982.
