= Nick Langworthy =

American politician (born 1981)

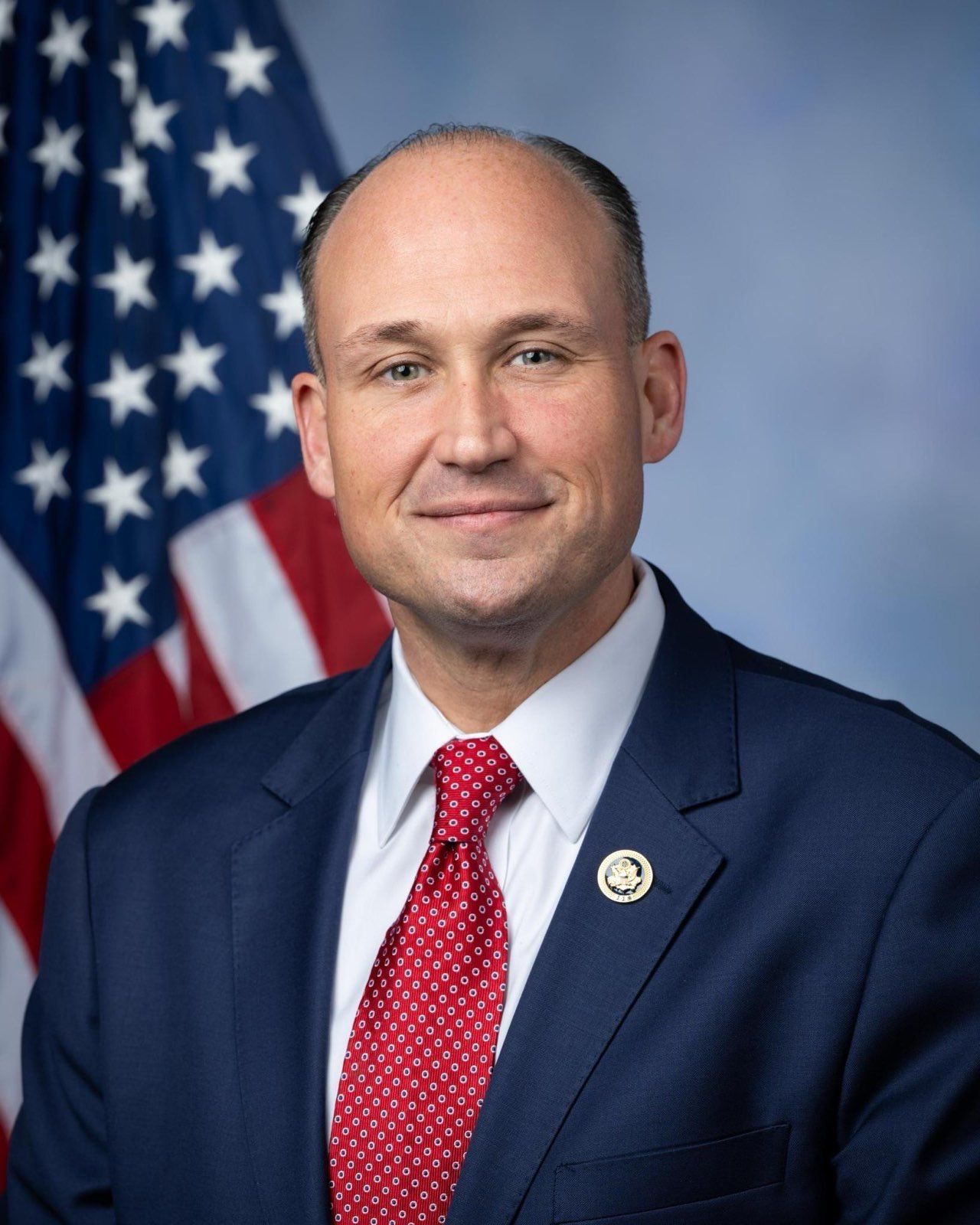
- Official portrait, 2024

Member of the U.S. House of Representatives from New York's 23rd district
- Incumbent
- Assumed office January 3, 2023
- Preceded by: Joe Sempolinski

Chair of the New York Republican Party
- In office July 1, 2019 – March 23, 2023
- Preceded by: Ed Cox
- Succeeded by: Ed Cox

Chair of the Erie County, New York Republican Committee
- In office May 2010 – September 2019
- Preceded by: James M. Domagalski
- Succeeded by: Karl J. Simmeth, Jr.

Personal details
- Born: Nicholas Andrew Langworthy; February 27, 1981 (age 45) Jamestown, New York, U.S.
- Party: Republican
- Spouse: Erin Langworthy
- Children: 2
- Education: Niagara University (BA)
- Website: House website Campaign website

Nicholas Andrew Langworthy (born February 27, 1981) is an American politician serving as the U.S. representative for New York's 23rd district since 2023. He was formerly the chair of the New York State Republican Committee. Langworthy was named chair of the committee in July 2019 after having chaired the Erie County, New York Republican Committee since 2010. He was the youngest state chair in party history.

== Early life ==
Langworthy was born in Jamestown, New York. He attended the Pine Valley Central School in his hometown of South Dayton and graduated in 1999. After graduation, he attended Niagara University, where he established the university's branch of the College Republicans. He graduated from Niagara with a bachelor's degree in political science and chaired the New York College Republicans.

== Early political career ==
=== Early career ===
After interning at Governor George Pataki's office and running a congressional campaign for Brett Sommer in 2000, Langworthy became a staffer for Congressman Thomas M. Reynolds. He managed Reynolds's successful reelection campaigns in 2004 and 2006. While working for Reynolds, Langworthy met his future wife, Erin Baker, who also worked on Reynolds's staff. Langworthy later managed the successful 2008 campaign of Representative Chris Lee and served as Lee's district office director until May 2010.

Langworthy is the founder and president of a polling firm, Liberty Opinion Research.

=== Erie County Republican Committee ===
Erie County Republican Committee chair James P. Domagalski resigned his chairmanship in 2010 to run for the New York State Senate. An early front-runner for the county chairship, Langworthy made himself as visible as possible on the county and state Republican scenes. Langworthy unanimously won a special election on May 5, 2010, becoming the youngest chair of either political party in Erie County's history. He was the only Republican county chair to endorse Carl Paladino in the Republican gubernatorial primary in 2010; he emerged as a political powerhouse when Paladino won the primary. Paladino's primary upset, together with the Republicans' successful effort to take control of the Erie County legislature, led Buffalo News chief political columnist Bob McCarthy to call Langworthy the "GOP's Young Elder".

In 2016, President-elect Donald Trump announced that Langworthy would serve on the executive committee of his transition team. Langworthy had been a vocal supporter of Trump's presidential campaign.

On September 14, 2019, it was announced that Langworthy would be succeeded as Erie County chair by Boston, New York Republican chair Karl J. Simmeth Jr.

=== New York State Republican Committee ===
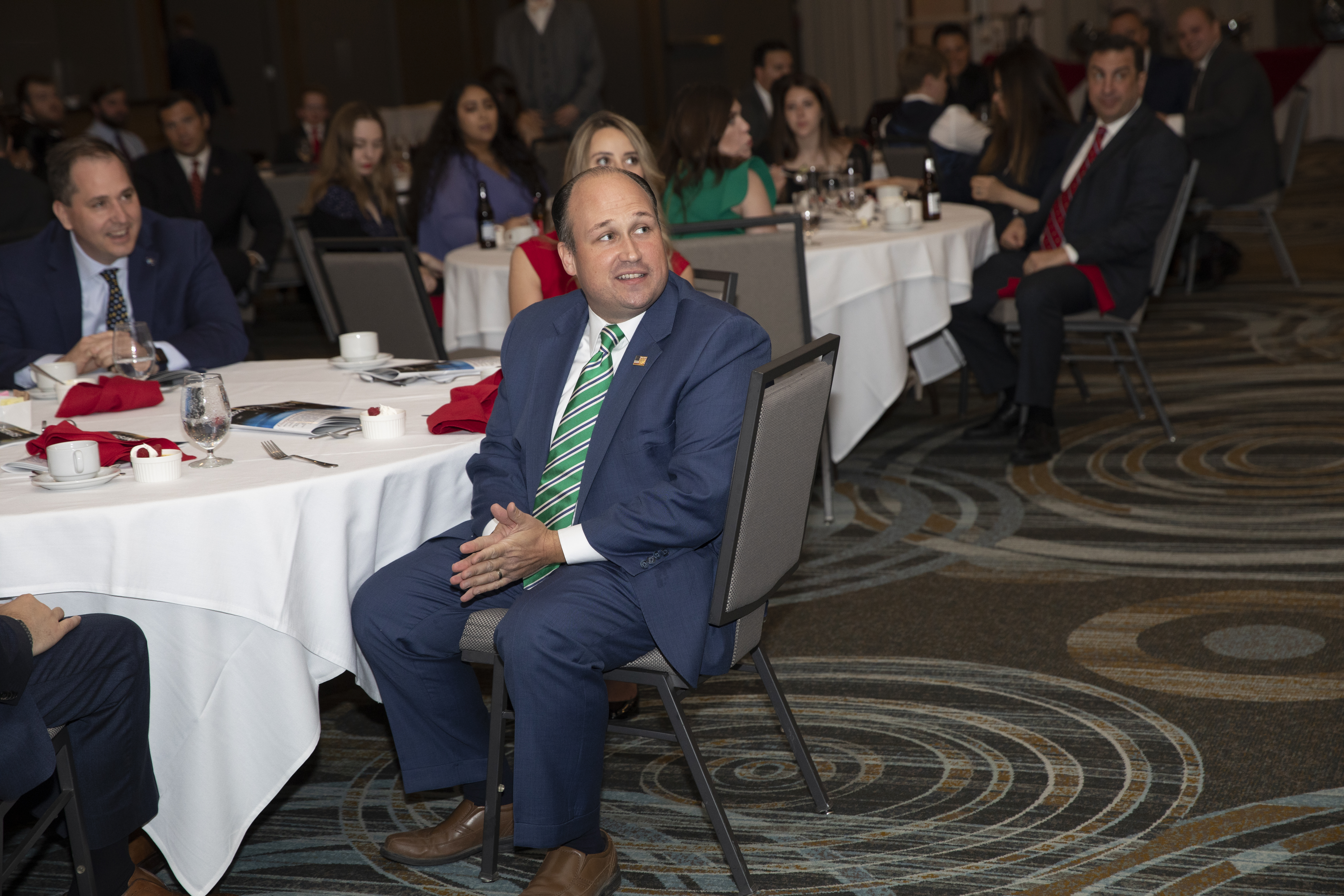
Langworthy in 2021

In 2018, Langworthy began campaigning for the chairship of the New York State Republican Committee against incumbent state chairman Ed Cox. On May 20, 2019, after Monroe County Republican Chair Bill Reilich announced his support for Langworthy, Cox announced that he was withdrawing his candidacy for a new term as chair; the Democrat and Chronicle reported that Langworthy was "poised to become" the next chair of the Republican Committee. On July 1, 2019, Langworthy was named chair of the New York State Republican Committee. He is the youngest state chair in party history.

== U.S. House of Representatives ==
=== Elections ===
==== 2022 ====
In June 2022, U.S. representative Chris Jacobs, who was running in New York's 23rd congressional district, announced that he would withdraw from the race and not seek reelection. Langworthy subsequently announced his candidacy for the seat, which represents portions of the Buffalo suburbs and most of the Southern Tier. His home in Pendleton, near Niagara Falls, had been in the 27th district before most of its territory was merged with the 23rd in redistricting. Jacobs had previously represented the 27th, and initially sought to follow most of his constituents into the 23rd before pulling out of the race.

Langworthy won the August 24 Republican primary—the real contest in this heavily Republican district—defeating Carl Paladino. In the general election, Langworthy defeated Democratic nominee Max Della Pia.

==== 2024 ====
Langworthy was reelected in 2024.

==== 2026 ====
Langworthy is running for reelection in 2026.

=== Caucus memberships ===
- Republican Main Street Partnership

=== Tenure ===
On June 11, 2024, Langworthy voted (at 6:36 in video) against including H.R.1282 - MAJ Richard Star Act in the FY 25 NDAA. This despite the fact that he is listed as a co-sponsor of the bill.

=== Epstein files ===
In his role as member of the House Rules Committee, on July 14, 2025, he voted "no" when the committee voted on an amendment by Congressman Ro Khanna (D-CA) seeking to release the Jeffrey Epstein files. The amendment, which included the language that "affirms Congress's Article I authority to conduct oversight, demands that the Trump Administration release the Epstein files, calls on the Department of Justice and FBI to submit a report on any delays, suppression, or destruction of evidence related to the files, and supports full transparency and access to these documents in the interest of justice and accountability" was defeated with 8 "nay" votes and 4 "yea" votes. Langworthy explained his "no" vote, claiming the amendment "was a pointless political gimmick, not a path to justice."

Langworthy voted "nay" on a subsequent September 2, 2025 resolution calling for a floor vote in the House on the bipartisan Epstein Files Transparency Act introduced by Reps. Khanna and Thomas Massie (R-KY). The Massie-Khanna measure allows the Justice Department to withhold or redact files that “contain personally identifiable information of victims or victims’ personal and medical files and similar files the disclosure of which would constitute a clearly unwarranted invasion of personal privacy.”

== Personal life ==
Langworthy's wife, Erin Baker Langworthy, ran unsuccessfully for Amherst, New York, Town Board in 2017. She served as finance chair of the Erie County Republican Committee.

Party political offices
Preceded by Ed Cox	Chair of the New York Republican Party; 2019–2023	Succeeded by Ed Cox
U.S. House of Representatives
Preceded by Joe Sempolinski	Member of the U.S. House of Representatives from New York's 23rd congressional district 2023–present	Incumbent
U.S. order of precedence (ceremonial)
Preceded by Greg Landsman	United States representatives by seniority 326th	Succeeded by Mike Lawler
