= Thomas J. Culhane =

American politician

Member of the New York State Assembly from the 82nd district
- In office January 1, 1973 – September 19, 1977
- Preceded by: Alexander Chananau
- Succeeded by: Sean P. Walsh

Personal details
- Born: August 16, 1928 The Bronx, New York City, New York
- Died: September 2, 2015 (aged 87) Brooklyn, New York City, New York
- Party: Democratic

Thomas J. Culhane (August 16, 1928 – September 2, 2015) was an American politician who served in the New York State Assembly from the 82nd district from 1973 to 1977.

He died on September 2, 2015, in Brooklyn, New York City, New York at age 87.
