= George Borrello =

American politician

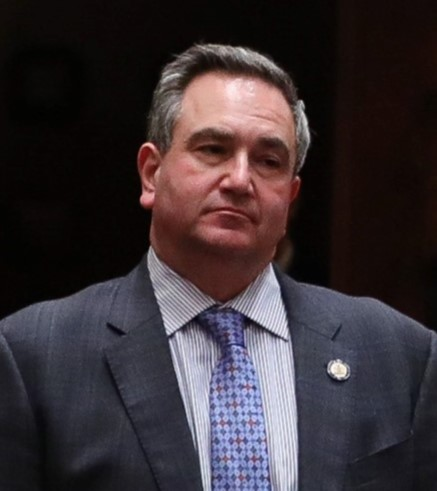
- Borrello in 2020

Chair of the New York State Senate Republican Campaign Committee
- Incumbent
- Assumed office January 12, 2023
- Leader: Rob Ortt
- Preceded by: Pamela Helming

Member of the New York State Senate from the 57th district
- Incumbent
- Assumed office November 26, 2019
- Preceded by: Catharine Young

Executive of Chautauqua County
- In office January 1, 2018 – November 26, 2019
- Preceded by: Vince Horrigan
- Succeeded by: Stephen Abdella (Acting)

Personal details
- Born: May 27, 1967 (age 59) Silver Creek, New York, U.S.
- Party: Republican
- Spouse: Kelly Borrello
- Education: Purdue University
- Profession: Businessman, Politician
- Website: Official website Campaign website

George M. Borrello (born May 27, 1967) is an American businessman and politician. He is currently a New York State Senator representing District 57 since 2019. Previously, he served as County Executive for Chautauqua County, New York from 2018 to 2019. He first entered politics when he served as a Chautauqua County Legislator from 2010 to 2017. In 2019, he ran for New York State Senate for District 57 against Austin Morgan to fill the vacancy left by the resignation of Catharine Young. On November 5, 2019, he defeated Morgan with 67.29% of the vote. On November 26, 2019, he took office as State Senator.

== Early life and career ==
Borrello was born and raised in Silver Creek and Fredonia, New York. He graduated from Fredonia High School in 1985 and Purdue University in 1989. He founded Top-Shelf Marketing, a supplier in the hospitality industry. Later, he merged the company with Progressive Specialty Glass Company and was Vice President of Marketing until 2017, when he retired to run for County Executive.

== Politics ==
Borrello was elected to the Chautauqua County Legislature in 2009, where he served four terms from January 1, 2010, to December 31, 2017. As a Legislator, he served as Vice Chair of Audit and Control Committee and Chair of the Planning and Economic Development Committee. In 2017, he was elected County Executive, succeeding Vince Horrigan, who decided not to seek another term.

=== 2019 New York State Senate special election ===
After the resignation of State Senator Catharine Young in March 2019, Borrello announced his candidacy for New York State Senate District 57. In June 2019, he defeated Allegany County Legislator Curt Crandall in the Republican Primary. He defeated Democratic nominee Austin Morgan in the general election. Borrello was also endorsed by the Conservative, Independence, and Libertarian Parties. Borrello went on to defeat Morgan in the 2019 general election.

=== Tenure in the New York State Senate ===
Borrello serves as ranking member of the Senate's Banks and Agriculture committees, and is a member of the Commerce, Economic Development, and Small Business; Cannabis; Elections; Finance; and State–Native American Relations committees. In January 2024, Senate Minority Leader Rob Ortt made Borrello ranking member of the Elections Committee, on which he had served since January 2023 as a rank-and-file member, and appointed him to the Committee on Energy and Telecommunications. Borrello's new committee standings were used to fill the spot of Senator Mark Walczyk, an Army reservist who left for military deployment. Borrello has been the chairman of the Senate Republican Campaign Committee since January 2023, when he was appointed by Ortt to succeed Pam Helming.

Borrello anchored his February 2026 re-election announcement with an emphasis on energy policy: Borrello blamed the state's Climate Act for rising electricity prices and is in opposition to turbine projects in Lake Erie and solar arrays covering farmland in Western New York. He has also identified criminal justice as a priority, calling for the repeal of the HALT Act as well as the state's bail and discovery laws.

2019 New York State Senate special election, District 57
Primary election
Party	Candidate	Votes	%
Republican	George Borrello	7,453	63.7
Republican	Curtis Crandall	4,247	36.3
Total votes		11,700	100
General election
Republican	George Borrello	33,885	55.06%
Conservative	George Borrello	4,891	7.95%
Libertarian	George Borrello	757	1.23%
'Total'	George Borrello	41,410	67.29%
Democratic	Austin Morgan	14,957	24.30%
Working Families	Austin Morgan	1,497	2.43%
'Total'	Austin Morgan	16,454	26.74%
Total votes		61,539	100.00%

== See also ==
- List of New York state senators
