= Jess J. Present =

American politician (1921–1998)

Member of the New York State Assembly from the 150th district
- In office January 1, 1967 – December 31, 1968
- Preceded by: Frank Walkley
- Succeeded by: John W. Beckman

Personal details
- Born: July 28, 1921 Jamestown, New York, U.S.
- Died: August 8, 1998 (aged 77)
- Party: Republican
- Education: Allegheny College
- Profession: politician

Jess J. Present (July 28, 1921 – August 8, 1998) was an American politician from New York.

== Life ==
He was born on July 28, 1921, in Jamestown, Chautauqua County, New York. He attended Jamestown High School and Allegheny College. During World War II he served in the U.S. Army Air Force. Afterwards he became a jeweler. He married Elaine Coates, and they had two sons.

He was a member of the New York State Assembly from 1966 to 1968, sitting in the 176th and 177th New York State Legislatures.

He was a member of the New York State Senate from 1969 until his death in 1998, sitting in the 178th, 179th, 180th, 181st, 182nd, 183rd, 184th, 185th, 186th, 187th, 188th, 189th, 190th, 191st and 192nd New York State Legislatures.

Present almost lost his 1992 re-election campaign to his Democratic opponent Nancy Bargar after machine ballots showed Bargar ahead by 900 votes. However, after counting absentee ballots and performing a machine recount, Present was declared the winner by 190 votes. Present was hurt in the general election by having Republican Assemblyman John W. Hasper win nine percent of the vote as the Conservative nominee. Hasper had lost the Republican primary to Present in September 1992.

Shortly after his election scare in 1992, Present was chosen as Deputy Majority Leader. Present was closely allied with Rockefeller Republican Ralph J. Marino during his time as senator. In 1994, after the Republican Revolution saw George Pataki elected governor against Marino's wishes, Marino was ousted as Majority Leader and replaced with Joseph Bruno. Present left as Deputy Majority Leader in January 1995 when Bruno chose one of his allies for the post.

Present died on August 8, 1998, in Bemus Point, New York.

== Sources ==
New York State Assembly
Preceded by new district	New York State Assembly; 164th District; 1966	Succeeded by district abolished
Preceded by Frank Walkley	New York State Assembly; 150th District; 1967–1968	Succeeded by John W. Beckman
New York State Senate
Preceded by James F. Hastings	New York State Senate; 57th District; 1969–1982	Succeeded by William Stachowski
Preceded by William Stachowski	New York State Senate; 56th District; 1983–1998	Succeeded by Patricia McGee
