= William B. Finneran =

American politician

Member of the New York State Assembly from the 89th district
- In office January 1, 1977 – December 31, 1982
- Preceded by: Alvin M. Suchin
- Succeeded by: Henry W. Barnett

Personal details
- Born: February 14, 1936 Brooklyn, New York City, New York
- Died: November 30, 2014 (aged 78) Clifton Park, New York
- Party: Democratic

William B. Finneran (February 14, 1936 – November 30, 2014) was an American politician who served in the New York State Assembly from the 89th district from 1977 to 1982.

He died of lung cancer on November 30, 2014, in Clifton Park, New York at age 78.
