= Henry W. Barnett =

American politician

Member of the New York State Assembly from the 89th district
- In office January 1, 1983 – December 31, 1992
- Preceded by: William B. Finneran
- Succeeded by: Naomi C. Matusow

Personal details
- Born: January 9, 1927 New York City, New York
- Died: May 11, 1994 (aged 67)
- Party: Republican

Henry W. Barnett (January 9, 1927 – May 11, 1994) was an American politician who served in the New York State Assembly from the 89th district from 1983 to 1992.
