= TheLadders.com =

US company providing job search services

Ladders, Inc.
- Type: Private
- Industry: Job search engine
- Founded: July 1, 2003; 23 years ago New York City
- Founder: Marc Cenedella, CEO
- Headquarters: New York City, US
- Website: www.theladders.com

Ladders, Inc. is a United States–based company providing career news, advice, and tools and an online job search service. Their search service only lists vetted job offers with annual salaries of $100,000 or more.

== History ==
Ladders, originally named UpLadder, was founded in July 2003 by current CEO Marc Cenedella to fill a perceived void in the executive online job-seeking market.

In 2009, Ladders was the recipient of a Webby Award in the employment category.

On April 25, 2017, the company launched Ladders News, a newsroom of about 10 that operates independently of the main company to produce daily journalism about the way work is changing around the world.

In 2017, Comscore data from January to May 2017 revealed Ladders, Inc., to be the fastest-growing jobs site in the U.S., based on sites with more than 1 million visitors and showing over 77 percent growth within the published time period

On March 6, 2020, Ladders, Inc., was featured in a Washington Post article highlighting the decision of CEO Marc Cenedella to proactively put the company in a simulated COVID-19 lockdown. All employees were required to work remotely from their homes and apartments, in training for what was at the time only a potential future requirement for businesses in New York City.

== Operations and business model ==
Ladders is headquartered in New York City, New York.

Ladders seeks to make its listings more useful to employers seeking executive personnel by utilizing a reverse business model that caters to the high-end job seeker.

Ladders charges employees and job seekers a subscription fee, but does offer some services and features with free sign up; and it is continually adding new content and features; these include an AI-powered resume optimization feature and a LinkedIn profile optimization feature.

Although usually referred to as a paid service, Ladders utilizes a broader business model:

- Basic membership: Users sign up with Ladders and receive access to the company's search engine, which targets jobs based on information provided by the user during sign up, and based on further updates and information provided by the user after sign up. Basic users gain full access to a daily inbox delivery of the Ladders News product, career resources, job applications limited to jobs marked "Apply for Free" that appear in search results, expert advice, business leadership interviews and career insights.
- Premium membership: Paid subscribers gain full access to job applications appearing in search results, a series of features exclusive to premium membership, and exclusive discounts and offers.

Casual site visitors have access to job search resources, including 73 downloadable, job-specific, resume example templates, a resume review tool, company information search, and career advice.

Membership networking and job referrals among all members is encouraged through available features.

Ladders also collects resumes and profiles which become available to recruiters signed up to their business-to-business division, Ladders Recruiter. As members, recruiters can post and promote available jobs and source members from the Ladders' database.

== Ladders News ==
On April 25, 2017, the company launched Ladders News, a newsroom that operates independently of the main company. Ladders News produces daily journalism about work-related topics and topics related to the future of work such as remote work, economic changes, and millennials in the workplace.

== Key people ==
=== Marc Cenedella ===
Marc Cenedella is an American businessman and political candidate who is the founding-CEO of Ladders. He is also the founder of social app Knozen and has authored or co-authored several books.

Cenedella graduated with a B.A. in political science from Yale University in 1992. He later earned an MBA from Harvard Business School in 1998, where he was named a Baker Scholar. Early in his career, Cenedella founded Forbes Pacifica Trading Company, an import-export business. He sold his interest in the company after graduating from Harvard Business School. Cenedella also worked for The Riverside Company, eventually becoming associate vice president of the organization. In 2000, Cenedella joined HotJobs, eventually becoming Senior Vice President of Finance & Operations. At the end of 2001, Cenedella orchestrated the sale of HotJobs to Yahoo! for $436 million.

Soon after leaving HotJobs, Cenedella teamed up with Alexandre Douzet and Andrew Koch, to create an online job search service aimed at $100K+ professionals. The company was launched under the name The Ladders in August 2003.

On October 10, 2011, then New York City Mayor Michael Bloomberg announced that Cenedella was part of his ten-strong "Council on Tech" to help drive the city toward greater tech growth. In 2012, Cenedella was laying the groundwork for a United States Senate campaign in New York for the seat held by Kirsten E. Gillibrand, but decided not to run after some allegedly racy blog posts were found on his website.

In 2014, Cenedella launched a social mobile app called Knozen.

Cenedella is a writer and contributor to Muck Rack, an aggregator of articles and news to sites like Medium, Business Insider, HuffPost, The Independent, New York Post, Entrepreneur Magazine, and Fast Company.

In 2022, Cenedella announced that he is running in the Republican primary for the U.S. House of Representatives in New York's 23rd District, however he withdrew before the primary.
