= New York's 57th State Senate district =

American legislative district

Senator
George Borrello; R–Sunset Bay
- Registration: 38.6% Republican; 30.0% Democratic; 22.3% No party preference
- Demographics: 90% White; 2% Black; 4% Hispanic; 1% Asian; 1% Native American
- Population (2017): 283,754
- Registered voters: 172,705

New York's 57th State Senate district is one of 63 districts in the New York State Senate. It has been represented by Republican George Borrello since a 2019 special election prompted by the resignation of fellow Republican Catharine Young.

== Geography ==
District 57 is located in the far southwestern corner of Upstate New York, including all of Allegany, Cattaraugus, and Chautauqua Counties, as well as parts of Livingston County.

The district overlaps with New York's 23rd and 24th congressional districts, and with the 133rd, 148th, and 150th districts of the New York State Assembly.

== Recent election results ==
=== 2026 ===
2026 New York State Senate election, District 57
Party	Candidate	Votes	%
Republican	George Borrello		
Conservative	George Borrello		
Total	George Borrello (incumbent)		
Democratic	Victoria Guite-Williams		
Working Families	Victoria Guite-Williams		
Total	Victoria Guite-Williams		
Write-in			
Total votes			

=== 2024 ===
2024 New York State Senate election, District 57
Party	Candidate	Votes	%
Republican	George Borrello	97,821	
Conservative	George Borrello	16,883	
Total	George Borrello (incumbent)	114,704	99.6
Write-in		475	0.4
Total votes		115,179	100.0
Republican hold			

=== 2022 ===
2022 New York State Senate election, District 57
Party	Candidate	Votes	%
Republican	George Borrello	70,897	
Conservative	George Borrello	10,776	
Total	George Borrello (incumbent)	81,673	73.1
Democratic	Daniel Brown	30,104	26.9
Write-in		16	0.0
Total votes		111,793	100.0
Republican hold			

=== 2020 ===
2020 New York State Senate election, District 57
Party	Candidate	Votes	%
Republican	George Borrello	75,790	
Conservative	George Borrello	8,566	
Independence	George Borrello	2,204	
Libertarian	George Borrello	1,374	
Total	George Borrello (incumbent)	87,934	71.7
Democratic	Frank Puglisi	31,967	
Working Families	Frank Puglisi	2,747	
Total	Frank Puglisi	34,714	28.3
Write-in		31	0.0
Total votes		122,679	100.0
Republican hold			

=== 2019 special ===
2019 New York State Senate special election, District 57
Primary election
Party	Candidate	Votes	%
Republican	George Borrello	7,787	63.5
Republican	Curtis Crandall	4,481	36.5
Write-in		0	0.0
Total votes		12,268	100.0
General election
Republican	George Borrello	34,759	
Conservative	George Borrello	5,066	
Independence	George Borrello	1,955	
Libertarian	George Borrello	783	
Total	George Borrello	42,563	71.1
Democratic	Austin Morgan	15,721	
Working Families	Austin Morgan	1,549	
Total	Austin Morgan	17,270	28.9
Write-in		21	0.0
Total votes		59,854	100.0
Republican hold			

=== 2018 ===
2018 New York State Senate election, District 57
Party	Candidate	Votes	%
Republican	Catharine Young	64,261	
Conservative	Catharine Young	8,414	
Independence	Catharine Young	4,961	
Reform	Catharine Young	728	
Total	Catharine Young (incumbent)	78,364	99.6
Write-in		320	0.4
Total votes		78,684	100.0
Republican hold			

=== 2016 ===
2016 New York State Senate election, District 57
Primary election
Party	Candidate	Votes	%
Reform	Catharine Young (incumbent)	12	54.5
Reform	Lee Hyson	10	45.5
Write-in		0	0.0
Total votes		22	100.0
General election
Republican	Catharine Young	77,548	
Conservative	Catharine Young	9,256	
Independence	Catharine Young	5,854	
Reform	Catharine Young	662	
Total	Catharine Young (incumbent)	93,320	83.0
Democratic	Lee Hyson	17,100	
Working Families	Lee Hyson	1,557	
Women's Equality	Lee Hyson	479	
Total	Lee Hyson	19,136	17.0
Write-in		44	0.0
Total votes		112,500	100.0
Republican hold			

=== 2014 ===
2014 New York State Senate election, District 57
Party	Candidate	Votes	%
Republican	Catharine Young	50,968	
Conservative	Catharine Young	8,338	
Independence	Catharine Young	6,692	
Total	Catharine Young (incumbent)	65,998	99.7
Write-in		172	0.3
Total votes		66,170	100.0
Republican hold			

=== 2012 ===
2012 New York State Senate election, District 57
Party	Candidate	Votes	%
Republican	Catharine Young	71,511	
Independence	Catharine Young	11,607	
Conservative	Catharine Young	10,136	
Total	Catharine Young (incumbent)	93,254	99.7
Write-in		305	0.3
Total votes		93,559	100.0
Republican hold			

=== Federal results in District 57 ===
Year	Office	Results
2020	President	Trump 62.1 – 35.5%
2016	President	Trump 62.3 – 32.2%
2012	President	Romney 55.5 – 42.6%
2012	Senate	Gillibrand 54.7 – 43.6%
