= Electoral history of Andrew Cuomo =

Elections featuring American politician

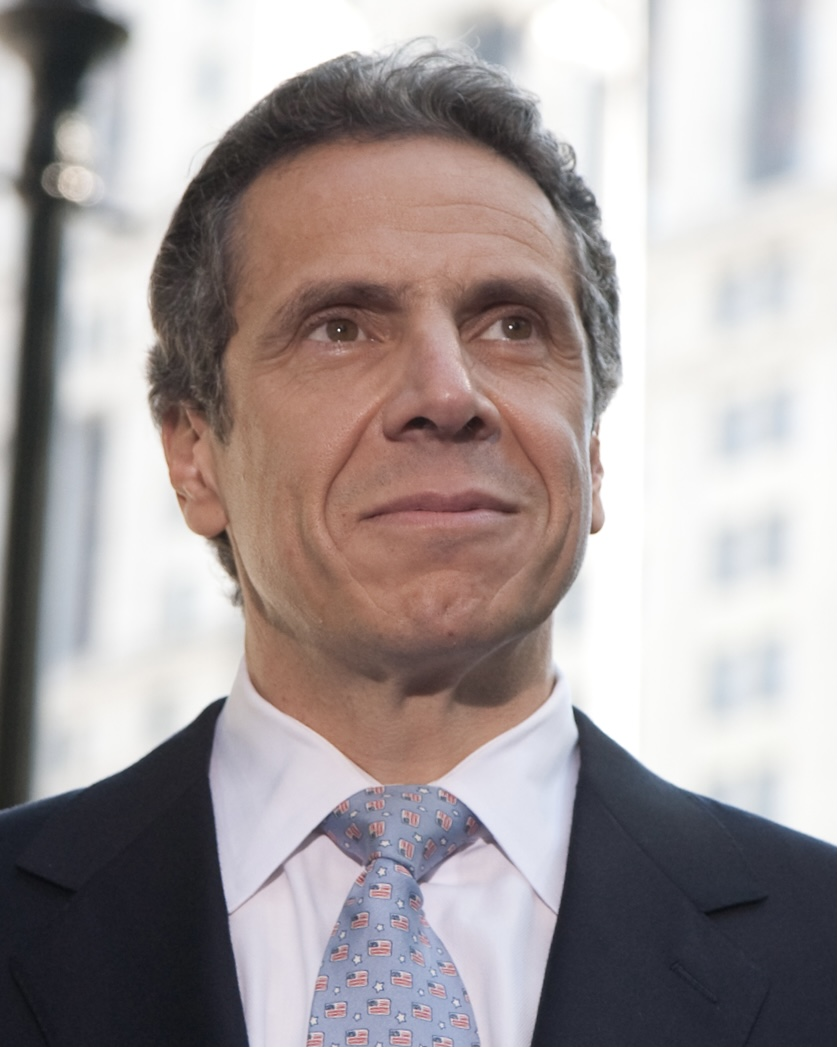
Andrew Cuomo outside New York City Hall.

This is the electoral history of Andrew Cuomo, who served as the 56th Governor of New York from 2011 to 2021, as the 64th Attorney General of New York from 2007 to 2010, and as the 11th United States Secretary of Housing and Urban Development from 1997 to 2001. He is the son of Mario Cuomo, the 52nd Governor of New York.

== New York Attorney General elections ==
=== 2006 ===
Democratic primary for the 2006 New York Attorney General election
Party	Candidate	Votes	%
Democratic	Andrew Cuomo	404,086	53.52%
Democratic	Mark Green	244,554	32.39%
Democratic	Sean Patrick Maloney	70,106	9.29%
Democratic	Charlie King	36,262	4.80%
Total votes		755,008	100%

2006 New York Attorney General general election
Party	Candidate	Votes	%
Democratic	Andrew Cuomo	2,356,809	54.77%
Working Families	Andrew Cuomo	152,502	3.54%
Total	Andrew Cuomo	2,509,311	58.31%
Republican	Jeanine Pirro	1,376,128	31.98%
Conservative	Jeanine Pirro	148,401	3.45%
Independence	Jeanine Pirro	168,051	3.91%
Total	Jeanine Pirro	1,692,580	39.33%
Green	Rachel Treichler	61,849	1.44%
Libertarian	Christopher B. Garvey	29,413	0.68%
Socialist Workers	Martin Koppel	10,197	0.24%
Total votes		4,303,350	100%
Democratic hold			

== New York gubernatorial elections ==
=== 2002 ===
Democratic primary for the 2002 New York gubernatorial election
Party	Candidate	Votes	%
Democratic	Carl McCall	539,883	85.28%
Democratic	Andrew Cuomo	93,195	14.72%
Total votes		633,078	100%

2002 New York gubernatorial general election
Party	Candidate	Votes	%
Republican	George Pataki (incumbent)	2,085,407	45.54%
Conservative	George Pataki (incumbent)	176,848	3.86%
Total	George Pataki (incumbent)	2,262,255	49.40%
Democratic	Carl McCall	1,442,531	31.50%
Working Families	Carl McCall	90,533	1.98%
Total	Carl McCall	1,534,064	33.50%
Independence	Tom Golisano	654,016	14.28%
Right to Life	Gerald Cronin	44,195	0.97%
Green	Stanley Aronowitz	41,797	0.91%
Marijuana Reform	Thomas K. Leighton	21,977	0.48%
Liberal	Andrew Cuomo	15,761	0.34%
Libertarian	Scott Jeffrey	5,013	0.11%
Total votes		4,579,078	100%
Republican hold			

=== 2010 ===
2010 New York gubernatorial general election
Party	Candidate	Votes	%
Democratic	Andrew Cuomo	2,609,465	56.52%
Working Families	Andrew Cuomo	154,835	3.35%
Independence	Andrew Cuomo	146,576	3.17%
Total	Andrew Cuomo	2,910,876	63.05%
Republican	Carl Paladino	1,289,817	27.94%
Conservative	Carl Paladino	232,215	5.03%
Taxpayers Party	Carl Paladino	25,825	0.56%
Total	Carl Paladino	1,547,857	33.53%
Green	Howie Hawkins	59,906	1.30%
Libertarian	Warren Redlich	48,359	1.05%
Rent Is Too Damn High	Jimmy McMillan	41,129	0.89%
Freedom Party	Charles Barron	24,571	0.53%
Anti-Prohibition Party	Kristin M. Davis	20,421	0.44%
	Blank, Void, Scattering	4,836	0.10%
Total votes		4,769,741	100%
Democratic hold			

=== 2014 ===
Democratic primary for the 2014 New York gubernatorial election
Party	Candidate	Votes	%
Democratic	Andrew Cuomo (incumbent)	361,380	62.92%
Democratic	Zephyr Teachout	192,210	33.47%
Democratic	Randy Credico	20,760	3.61%
Total votes		574,350	100%

2014 New York gubernatorial general election
Party	Candidate	Votes	%
Democratic	Andrew Cuomo (incumbent)	1,811,672	47.52%
Working Families	Andrew Cuomo (incumbent)	126,244	3.31%
Independence	Andrew Cuomo (incumbent)	77,762	2.04%
Women's Equality	Andrew Cuomo (incumbent)	53,802	1.41%
Total	Andrew Cuomo (incumbent)	2,069,480	54.28%
Republican	Rob Astorino	1,234,951	32.39%
Conservative	Rob Astorino	250,634	6.57%
Stop-Common Core	Rob Astorino	51,492	1.35%
Total	Rob Astorino	1,537,077	40.31%
Green	Howie Hawkins	184,419	4.84%
Libertarian	Michael McDermott	16,769	0.44%
Sapient	Steven Cohn	4,963	0.13%
Total votes		3,812,708	100%
Democratic hold			

=== 2018 ===
Democratic primary for the 2018 New York gubernatorial election
Party	Candidate	Votes	%
Democratic	Andrew Cuomo (incumbent)	1,021,160	65.53%
Democratic	Cynthia Nixon	537,192	34.47%
Total votes		1,490,753	100%

2018 New York gubernatorial general election
Party	Candidate	Votes	%
Democratic	Andrew Cuomo (incumbent)	3,424,416	56.16%
Working Families	Andrew Cuomo (incumbent)	114,478	1.88%
Independence	Andrew Cuomo (incumbent)	68,713	1.13%
Women's Equality	Andrew Cuomo (incumbent)	27,733	0.45%
Total	Andrew Cuomo (incumbent)	3,635,340	59.62%
Republican	Marc Molinaro	1,926,485	31.60%
Conservative	Marc Molinaro	253,624	4.16%
Reform	Marc Molinaro	27,493	0.45%
Total	Marc Molinaro	2,207,602	36.21%
Green	Howie Hawkins	103,946	1.70%
Libertarian	Larry Sharpe	95,033	1.56%
SAM	Stephanie Miner	55,441	0.91%
Total votes		6,097,362	100%
Democratic hold			

=== 2022 ===
On May 28, 2019, Cuomo announced that he would seek re-election to a fourth term in 2022. However, On August 10, 2021, Cuomo resigned from office due to allegations of sexual harassment. He was replaced by his lieutenant governor, Kathy Hochul.

== New York City mayoral elections ==
=== 2025 ===
2025 New York City Democratic mayoral primary
Candidate	Round 1		Round 2		Round 3	
Candidate	Votes	%	Votes	%	Votes	%
Zohran Mamdani	469,642	43.82%	469,755	43.86%	573,169	56.39%
Andrew Cuomo	387,137	36.12%	387,377	36.17%	443,229	43.61%
Brad Lander	120,634	11.26%	120,707	11.27%	Eliminated	
Adrienne Adams	44,192	4.12%	44,359	4.14%	Eliminated	
Scott Stringer	17,820	1.66%	17,894	1.67%	Eliminated	
Zellnor Myrie	10,593	0.99%	10,648	0.99%	Eliminated	
Whitney Tilson	8,443	0.79%	8,525	0.80%	Eliminated	
Michael Blake	4,366	0.41%	4,389	0.41%	Eliminated	
Jessica Ramos	4,273	0.40%	4,294	0.40%	Eliminated	
Paperboy Prince	1,560	0.15%	1,628	0.15%	Eliminated	
Selma Bartholomew	1,489	0.14%	1,505	0.14%	Eliminated	
Write-ins	1,581	0.15%	Eliminated			
Active votes	1,071,730	100.00%	1,071,081	99.94%	1,016,398	94.84%
Exhausted ballots	—		649	0.06%	55,332	5.16%
Source: New York City Board of Elections

2025 New York City mayoral election
Party	Candidate	Votes	%	±%
Democratic	Zohran Mamdani	944,950	43.07%	−22.12%
Working Families	Zohran Mamdani	169,234	7.71%	N/A
Total	Zohran Mamdani	1,114,184	50.78%	N/A
Fight and Deliver	Andrew Cuomo	906,614	41.32%	N/A
Republican	Curtis Sliwa	143,305	6.53%	−20.37%
Protect Animals	Curtis Sliwa	10,444	0.48%	N/A
Total	Curtis Sliwa	153,749	7.01%	−19.89%
Safe&Affordable/EndAntiSemitism	Eric Adams (incumbent) (withdrawn)	6,897	0.31%	N/A
Conservative	Irene Estrada	2,856	0.13%	−0.99%
Integrity	Jim Walden (withdrawn)	2,319	0.11%	N/A
Quality of Life	Joseph Hernandez	1,379	0.06%	N/A
Write-in		6,206	0.28%	−0.34%
Total votes		2,194,204	100%	
Democratic hold				
