= Jimmy McMillan =

American political activist (born 1946)

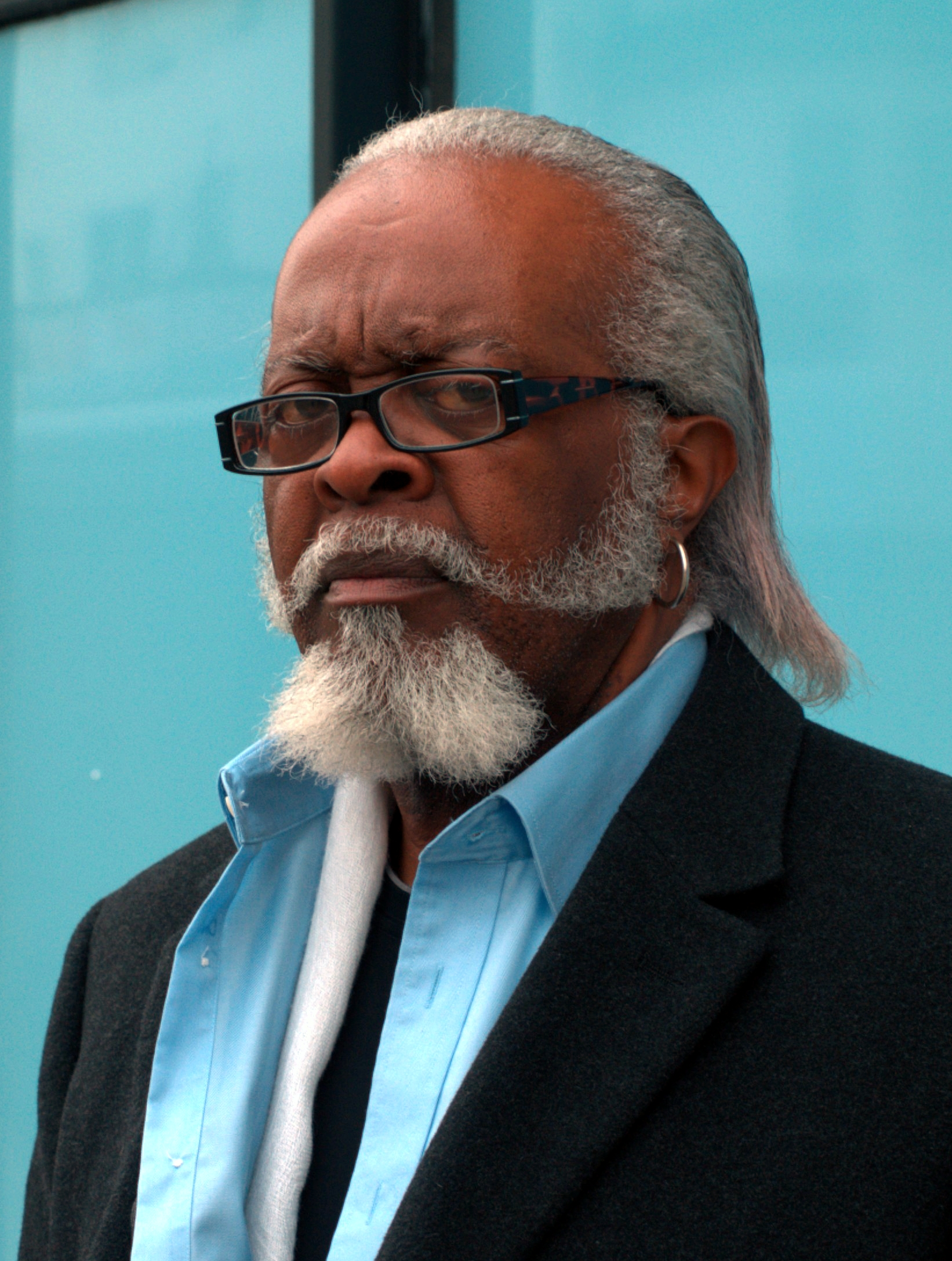
- McMillan in 2011

Chairman and leader of the Rent Is Too Damn High Party
- In office 2005–2015
- Preceded by: Position established
- Succeeded by: Position abolished

Personal details
- Born: James McMillan III; December 1, 1946 (age 79) New Smyrna Beach, Florida, U.S.
- Party: Rent Is Too Damn High Party
- Other political affiliations: Republican; Democratic (formerly)
- Children: 2
- Occupation: Political activist Perennial candidate

James McMillan III (born December 1, 1946) is an American political activist and Vietnam War veteran. He was a perennial candidate in New York City.

McMillan is best known as the founder of the Rent Is Too Damn High Party, a New York–based political party. McMillan ran for office at least six times since 1993, most notably in the 2010 New York gubernatorial election. He declared in December 2010 that he would run in the 2012 U.S. presidential election as a Republican. He did not appear on the ballot in any state and suspended his campaign to return to the Rent Is Too Damn High Party and run for Mayor of New York City in the 2013 election. He attempted to run for governor again in the 2014 election but did not make the ballot.

McMillan announced his candidacy for the Republican nomination for President of the United States in the 2016 election, but withdrew from the campaign on December 9, 2015. He subsequently announced that he was retiring from politics before endorsing Republican candidate Donald Trump. The Rent Is Too Damn High Party website announced that McMillan would come out of retirement to make a fourth run for governor. His petitions were challenged and ruled invalid in September 2018.

== Early life and education ==
Originally from New Smyrna Beach, Florida, McMillan served in the U.S. Army during the Vietnam War after which he briefly spent time in the 1970s as an R&B recording artist, known as Jimmy Mack, and had several Northern soul singles, including "A Woman is So Hard to Understand". He graduated from Barkley Private Security Investigations Academy prior to 1993.

== Political career ==
=== Early campaigns ===
McMillan's first run for political office came in 1993, when he ran for Mayor of New York on the Rent Is Too Damn High ticket. In the course of that campaign, McMillan was at one point tied to a tree and doused with gasoline; he later climbed the Brooklyn Bridge and refused to come down from it unless television stations broadcast his message. He was disqualified from the ballot for coming 300 petition signatures short of the 7,500 needed to qualify for the general election ballot.

McMillan next ran for Governor of New York in 1994 by traveling from his home in Brooklyn through upstate New York to Buffalo on foot, staying in homeless shelters along the way; he had planned to walk back to Brooklyn, but an injury in Rochester led to him taking a bus home. When he arrived in Buffalo, the site of the state Democratic convention, McMillan disrupted a speech by incumbent Governor Mario Cuomo at the convention and was thrown out because of it. After failing to collect enough signatures to get onto the ballot, he continued in a write-in campaign.

McMillan ran for the United States Senate in the 2000 election in New York but was removed from the ballot.

McMillan qualified for the November general election ballot for Mayor of New York City in 2005 and 2009. In 2005, he received over 4,111 votes (0.32%) and in 2009, he received 2,332 votes (0.2%).

McMillan received 13,355 votes (0.3%) in the 2006 gubernatorial election, coming fifth out of six candidates.

=== 2010 gubernatorial campaign ===
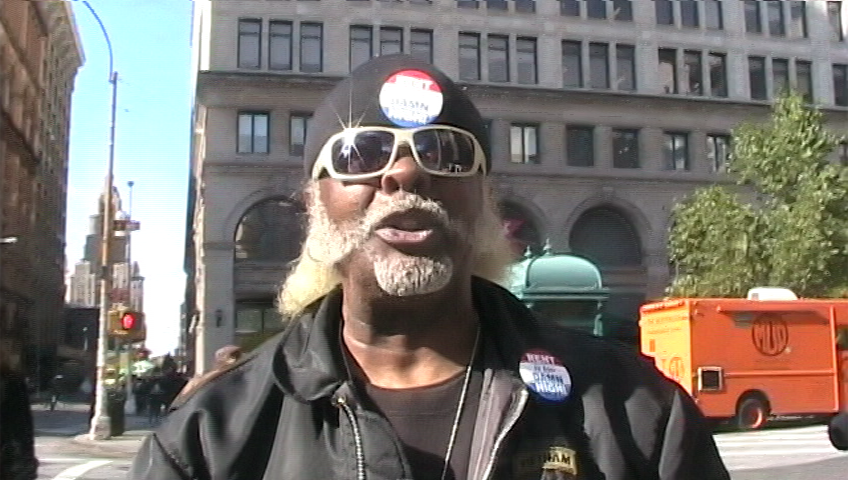
Jimmy McMillan in 2009

For the 2010 campaign, McMillan filed petitions to appear on the Democratic primary ballot and the Rent Is Too Damn High line. However, he put very little effort into the Democratic petitions, and the vast majority of the 13,350 signatures bearing his name were collected by Randy Credico, who had partnered with McMillan for a joint Democratic petition. Credico had counted on McMillan to collect 10,000 signatures to put his total at over 20,000, above the 15,000 required to get onto the ballot, but McMillan never followed through, leaving both candidates short of the necessary signatures to force a Democratic primary against state Attorney General Andrew Cuomo, who was thus unopposed. Credico, in response, called McMillan a "jack-off" and a "sorry ass", accusing him of "working against me", "turn[ing] in a wagonload of blank pages and then [leaving] Albany in brand new automobiles." McMillan did file the necessary signatures to get onto the "Rent Is 2 Damn High" line; the petitions were technically invalid because they did not include a lieutenant governor candidate, but McMillan was allowed onto the ballot anyway because nobody challenged the petitions.

During an appearance at a 2010 gubernatorial debate in which McMillan figured prominently, he stated his views on gay marriage, by saying "The Rent Is Too Damn High Party believes that if you want to marry a shoe, I'll marry you." After the debate, McMillan garnered significant attention from the media. The Democratic nominee, Andrew Cuomo responded to one of his statements during this appearance by saying "I'm with Jimmy; the rent is too damn high." The appearance inspired a song by The Gregory Brothers.

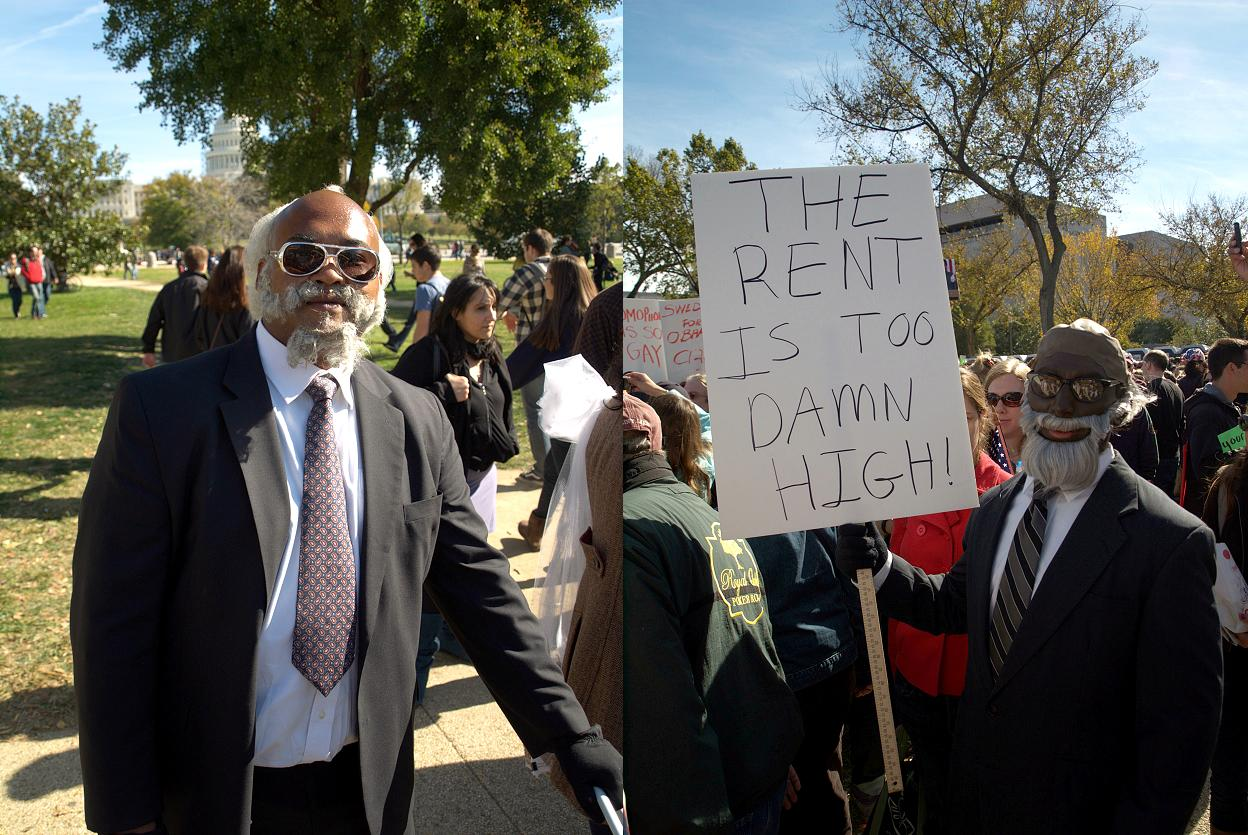
McMillan's significant media coverage spawned imitators, such as these two men at the Rally to Restore Sanity and/or Fear in Washington, D.C.

McMillan, perceived by many as a protest vote, garnered 41,129 votes (0.88%), enough to finish in fifth place out of seven, compared to winning Andrew Cuomo's 2.5 million votes and second-place Carl Paladino's 1.4 million votes. McMillan gained almost as many votes as Libertarian Party candidate Warren Redlich (48,359 votes), and nearly double the votes of Anti-Prohibition Party candidate Kristin M. Davis (20,421 votes).

Regarding his use of black gloves during the debate, "I'm a war vet," McMillan said. "Don't forget I was in Vietnam for two and half years and I have three Bronze Stars, but the chemicals of Agent Orange—dioxin and a lot of other chemicals mixed up—I would get sick. When I get home tonight, I know I'm not going to be able to breathe if I take them off. It could be psychological, I don't know, but I just put em on and wear them anyway."

McMillan's gubernatorial campaign was the subject of an independent, feature-length documentary titled DAMN!. Filmmakers Aaron Fisher-Cohen and Kristian Almgren documented McMillan throughout his campaign for Governor of New York, as well as the events immediately following McMillan's loss of the election. The film was an official selection at the Little Rock Film Festival in Arkansas, as well as at the Brooklyn Film Festival, but did not officially premiere until August 2011.

=== 2012 presidential campaign ===
McMillan was a registered member of the Democratic Party. Then, on December 23, 2010, he said that he would switch parties and run as a Republican in the 2012 U.S. presidential election, to avoid a primary challenge from President Barack Obama. He also campaigned with performance artist and activist Vermin Supreme and appeared as Supreme's presidential running mate in the 2014 documentary about Supreme's 2012 presidential campaign, Who Is Vermin Supreme? An Outsider Odyssey, directed by Steve Onderick. McMillan and Supreme made a pact, each agreeing to act as vice president for the other if either were elected. He believes that his greatest political strengths include a mastery of social media, an ability to pinch pennies, and inimitable political vision.

McMillan appeared at the Conservative Political Action Conference in February 2011. He also appeared at Northeastern University in March 2011, through the Political Science Student Association, where he discussed key issues. McMillan campaigned during the Occupy Wall Street protests, criticizing the protesters for voting for the wrong person but defending the protesters' right to protest. On November 15, 2011, McMillan held court on the 23rd floor of the Financial Industry Regulatory Authority offices kibbitzing with his legal staff and media representatives. McMillan was the keynote speaker at Occupy Tenafly on May Day 2012. There, he told protesters that college tuition is also "too damn high".

He was not invited to any of the Republican debates and did not appear on any primary ballots. However, he did appear in a debate against comedian Connor Ratliff on The Chris Gethard Show, a public access program in New York City. Ratliff was also running for president on the platform of him being old enough to be elected president. On September 13, 2012, McMillan suspended his candidacy to run for Mayor of New York City in the 2013 election, and endorsed President Barack Obama.

=== 2013 mayoral campaign ===
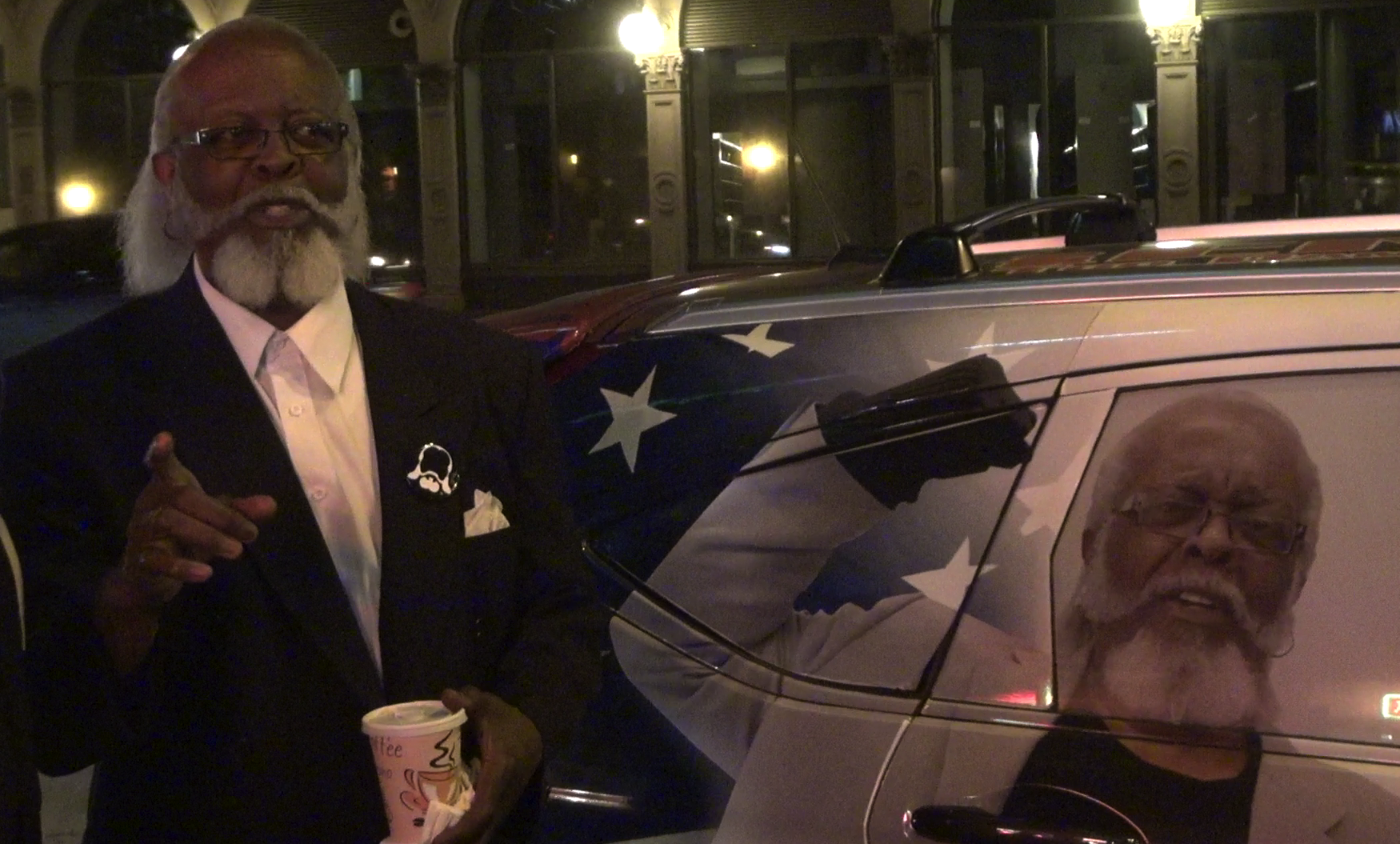
Jimmy McMillan in 2013 on a NYC street corner with his car

McMillan announced his fourth campaign for Mayor of New York City on September 13, 2012. On April 24, 2013, McMillan released a song and video called "Rent Is Too Damn High" on YouTube. In the song, McMillan raps about the problems of the American economy. In one part of the song, he says, "Rent and the deficit is too damn high. Poverty and unemployment both up in the sky. Wages and education is too damn low, economic recovery is too damn slow." McMillan's video received over 300,000 views in its two first days after being uploaded.

McMillan endorsed Anthony Weiner in the Democratic primary. In the general election, McMillan received 1,990 votes (0.18%).

=== 2014 gubernatorial campaign ===
On May 22, 2014, McMillan announced his intentions to again run for Governor of New York. However, his petition to be on the ballot was challenged, and he was later thrown off the ballot by the state board of elections, which claimed his petition contained too many photocopied pages to meet the signature threshold.

Subsequently, McMillan endorsed the Libertarian Party candidate, Michael McDermott, for governor.

=== 2016 presidential campaign ===
McMillan announced his candidacy for the Republican nomination for President of the United States in the 2016 election, but withdrew from the campaign on December 9, 2015. He subsequently announced that he was retiring from politics before endorsing Republican candidate Donald Trump.

=== 2017 City Council campaign ===
McMillan ran for New York City Council in 2017 as a Republican/Rent Is Too Damn High fusion ticket. He lost to Carlina Rivera, a Democrat, finishing second with 12% of the vote, beating out three other candidates of various parties including Liberal and Green.

=== 2018 gubernatorial campaign ===
McMillan announced another run for governor in 2018, accusing then-incumbent Andrew Cuomo and the Moreland Commission of violating federal civil rights laws. He submitted his petitions on August 21. They were challenged and ruled invalid in September.

== Political positions ==
McMillan's political positions are largely populist:

- McMillan has expressed opposition to federal bailouts, specifically the Wall Street Bailout of 2008 and the Obama Administration's bailout of General Motors. Referencing the bailout and his presidential run, he said of Obama: "If you don't do your job right, I am coming at you."
- McMillan believes that global warming is a natural occurrence that occurs every 15,000 years. He disputes the idea that it is caused by man and pollution, saying he "isn't buying [the] punk science" of Al Gore.
- A supporter of same-sex marriage, McMillan joked in the 2010 gubernatorial debate he would allow marriage between a person and a shoe. After the Marriage Equality Act passed, McMillan stated of same-sex couples, "Now you don't have to marry a shoe, you can marry somebody."
- On transgender people, McMillan says "When you see a guy walk down the street and he's got a little skirt on, and he's so happy. Why shouldn't you be happy? This is America, it's beautiful to watch someone different."
- On sexual expression, McMillan says "We all are freaky. He (Anthony Weiner) just exposed his freaky-ism in the wrong way." McMillan, in regard to Weiner's infidelity and sexual communications, considered them a "marketing bonanza".
- McMillan, as founder of the Rent Is Too Damn High Party, is against high rent and property taxes for homeowners. He believes that lowering rent and cutting taxes will ease financial stress and help eradicate hunger and poverty, as well as raise tax revenue. He surmises that reducing rent would "create 3 to 6 million jobs" by freeing up capital to give businesses a chance to hire people. He also favors tax credits for commuters.
- McMillan and the party are in favor of writing off all taxes owed to the state, consolidating the rent boards in New York, seizure of unoccupied apartment buildings, reforming the state court system, and free college tuition.
- McMillan is in favor of having fixed rate of low rent across America, which would be the same regardless of property value. He states that adjusting the rent for property value "is a bunch of crap" and "a scheme to run out the poor".
- McMillan and the party oppose any spending cuts to education or elderly care services.
- Of his potential Republican opponents for the Presidential nomination, he thinks of Newt Gingrich as a "good liar" in the vein of John Edwards and that "people look at him and laugh", Mitt Romney as a "good-looking guy [that] will keep the ladies from looking at me". He has also stated that he loves Sarah Palin and holds a strongly negative view of former New York City mayor Michael Bloomberg. He views former governor Andrew Cuomo as a do-nothing and former New Jersey Governor Chris Christie as "just a big mouth (...) New Jersey is crumbling just like every state in the union."

== Personal life ==
Originally from New Smyrna Beach, Florida, McMillan is single and has two adult children. McMillan claims his eldest child, a daughter, developed disabilities as a result of his exposure to Agent Orange. His younger son (James McMillan IV) served in the U.S. military. The elder McMillan served in the United States Army during the Vietnam War. After his time in Vietnam, he briefly spent time in the 1970s as an R&B recording artist; he claims to have spent a brief time at Brunswick Records before leaving the label to do independent work. McMillan graduated from Barkley Private Security Investigations Academy prior to 1993. McMillan has worked as a male stripper, and considers Deep Throat his favorite film.

According to a 2010 interview with the New York Times, McMillan did not pay rent on a Flatbush apartment he was claiming as his residence and had not done so since the 1980s. His landlord apparently allowed him to reside in his apartment for free in exchange for performing maintenance work on his apartment building. He had previously told the Wall Street Journal that he paid rent of $800 a month for his apartment. He paid the rent for an apartment McMillan shared with his son in the East Village in Manhattan, which was $900 per month under rent controls. The landlord of the East Village apartment was moving to evict McMillan on the grounds that McMillan lived in the Flatbush apartment and not in the East Village one; McMillan, who held the East Village apartment lease since 1977, claimed that the Flatbush apartment was not his residence but instead an office for the Rent Is Too Damn High Party.

As of October 2022, McMillan was living in a nursing home in Queens.

== In popular culture ==
McMillan was portrayed by Kenan Thompson in the Weekend Update segment of the sketch comedy show Saturday Night Live on October 23, 2010. Thompson, as McMillan, kept saying "the rent is too damn high" in response to most of the questions put to him. He also referred to himself as a billy goat and "the black Lorax", and said that, if elected, he would be the country's "last black President". The real McMillan praised the portrayal, saying that "that put me over the top... this election is over. Jimmy's gonna win it."

A character parodying McMillan was portrayed in Season 3 Episode 7 of Rick and Morty, "The Ricklantis Mixup".

McMillan's tagline has been quoted by several prominent New Yorkers, including Ritchie Torres and Matthew Yglesias.

== In media ==
McMillan guest starred in the music video for "Punx Not Dead, I Am" by Morning Glory.

== Electoral history ==
Results of the 2005 New York City mayoral election
Party	Candidate	Votes	%	±%
Republican/Liberal	Michael Bloomberg	678,444	52.6	
Independence	Michael Bloomberg	74,645	5.8	
Total	Michael Bloomberg (incumbent)	753,089	58.4	+8.1
Democratic	Fernando Ferrer	503,219	39.0	−8.9
Conservative	Thomas Ognibene	14,630	1.1	+0.9
Green	Anthony Gronowicz	8,297	0.6	+0.1
Rent Is Too Damn High	Jimmy McMillan	4,111	0.3	+0.3
Libertarian	Audrey Silk	2,888	0.2	+0.1
Socialist Workers	Martin Koppel	2,256	0.2	+0.2
Education	Seth Blum	1,176	0.1	+0.1
Write-Ins		269	0.02	+0.02
Majority		249,870	19.4	+17.0
Turnout		1,289,935		
Republican hold		Swing	+8.5	

2006 gubernatorial election in New York
Party	Candidate	Running mate	Votes	Percentage	Swing
Democratic	Eliot Spitzer		2,740,864	58.34%	▲26.84%
Independence	Eliot Spitzer		190,661	4.06%	▼10.22%
Working Families	Eliot Spitzer		155,184	3.30%	▲1.32%
Total	Eliot Spitzer	David Paterson	3,086,709	65.70%	▲32.20%
Republican	John Faso		1,105,681	23.54%	▼22.00%
Conservative	John Faso		168,654	3.59%	▼0.27%
Total	John Faso	C. Scott Vanderhoef	1,274,335	27.12%	▼22.28%
Green	Malachy McCourt	Brian Jones	42,166	0.89%	▼0.02%
Libertarian	John Clifton	Chris Edes	14,736	0.31%	▲0.20%
Rent Is Too Damn High	Jimmy McMillan	None	13,355	0.28%	N/A
Socialist Workers	Maura DeLuca	Ben O'Shaughnessy	5,919	0.13%	N/A
	Blank, Void, Scattering		116,622	5.55%	
Majority			1,812,374	38.58%	▲22.68%
Totals			4,437,220	100.00%	
Democratic gain from Republican			Swing		

2009 general election	party	Manhattan	The Bronx	Brooklyn	Queens	Staten Island	Total	%
Bloomberg's margin over Mark Green (2001)		– 22,777	– 21,683	– 28,182	+ 46,904	+ 61,227	+ 35,489	+ 2.4%
change in Bloomberg's margin of victory, 2001–2005		+ 98,973	– 19,634	+ 97,622	+ 48,125	– 10,705	+ 214,381	+ 17.0%
Bloomberg's margin over Fernando Ferrer (2005)		+ 76,196	– 41,317	+ 69,440	+ 95,029	+ 50,522	+ 249,870	+ 19.4%
change in Bloomberg's margin of victory, 2005–2009		– 35,010	+ 6,268	– 91,392	– 59,742	– 19,397	– 199,273	– 15.0%
Bloomberg's margin over Bill Thompson (2009)		+ 41,186	– 35,049	– 21,952	+ 35,287	+ 31,125	+ 50,597	+ 4.4%
net change in Bloomberg's margin, 2001–2009		+ 63,963	– 13,366	+ 6,230	– 11,617	– 30,102	+ 15,108	+ 2.0%
Michael R. Bloomberg	Republican	102,903	42,066	117,706	126,569	46,149	435,393	37.7%
Michael R. Bloomberg	Republican	35.9%	29.0%	34.6%	42.3%	55.4%	435,393	37.7%
Michael R. Bloomberg	Independence/Jobs & Education	56,934	11,730	36,033	36,364	9,012	150,073	13.0%
Michael R. Bloomberg	Independence/Jobs & Education	19.9%	8.1%	10.6%	12.2%	10.8%	150,073	13.0%
Michael R. Bloomberg	Total	159,837	53,796	153,739	162,933	55,161	585,466	50.7%
Michael R. Bloomberg	Total	55.8%	37.0%	45.1%	54.5%	66.2%	585,466	50.7%
Bill Thompson	Democratic	110,975	86,899	163,230	122,935	22,956	506,995	43.9%
Bill Thompson	Democratic	38.7%	59.8%	47.9%	41.1%	27.5%	506,995	43.9%
Bill Thompson	Working Families Party	7,676	1,946	12,461	4,711	1,080	27,874	2.4%
Bill Thompson	Working Families Party	2.7%	1.3%	3.7%	1.6%	1.3%	27,874	2.4%
Bill Thompson	Total	118,651	88,845	175,691	127,646	24,036	534,869	46.3%
Bill Thompson	Total	41.4%	61.2%	51.6%	42.7%	28.8%	534,869	46.3%
Stephen Christopher	Conservative	2,217	1,480	5,690	5,267	3,359	18,013	1.6%
Stephen Christopher	Conservative	0.8%	1.0%	1.7%	1.8%	4.0%	18,013	1.6%
Billy Talen	Green	3,083	434	3,338	1,680	367	8,902	0.8%
Billy Talen	Green	1.1%	0.3%	1.0%	0.6%	0.4%	8,902	0.8%
Jimmy McMillan	Rent Is Too High	823	217	764	404	124	2,332	0.2%
Francisca Villar	Socialism & Liberation	674	253	577	420	72	1,996	0.2%
Joseph Dobrian	Libertarian	556	104	413	388	155	1,616	0.1%
Dan Fein	Socialist Workers	493	120	376	263	59	1,311	0.1%
Joseph Leon Reuben-Levy Simon	Twenty-Four Party	0	0	0	0	0	0	0.0%
Write-ins †		100	30	77	60	30	297	.03%
Total recorded votes		286,434	145,279	340,665	299,061	83,363	1,154,802	100.00%
unrecorded ballots		5,172	3,659	6,645	6,254	1,525	23,255	
Total ballots cast		291,606	148,938	347,310	305,315	84,888	1,178,057	
†The three candidates who received more than 7 write-in votes each were C. Montgomery Burns (Homer Simpson's fictional boss), 27; City Councilman Tony Avella (who lost the Democratic mayoral primary), 13; and former Mayor Rudy Giuliani (Republican), 11.
Source: Board of Elections in the City of New York, November 24, 2009

Gubernatorial election in New York, 2010
Party	Candidate	Running mate	Votes	Percentage	Swing
Democratic	Andrew Cuomo		2,609,465	56.52%	▼1.82%
Working Families	Andrew Cuomo		154,835	3.35%	▲0.05%
Independence	Andrew Cuomo		146,576	3.17%	▼0.89%
Total	Andrew Cuomo	Robert Duffy	2,910,876	63.05%	▼2.65%
Republican	Carl Paladino		1,289,817	27.94%	▲4.40%
Conservative	Carl Paladino		232,215	5.03%	▲1.44%
Taxpayers	Carl Paladino		25,825	0.56%	
Total	Carl Paladino	Greg Edwards	1,547,857	33.53%	▲6.41%
Green	Howie Hawkins	Gloria Mattera	59,906	1.30%	▲0.41%
Libertarian	Warren Redlich	Alden Link	48,359	1.05%	▲0.74%
Rent Is Too Damn High	Jimmy McMillan	James D. Schultz	41,129	0.89%	▲0.61%
Freedom	Charles Barron	Eva M. Doyle	24,571	0.53%	
Anti-Prohibition	Kristin M. Davis	Tanya Gendelman	20,421	0.44%	
	Scattering		4,836	0.10%	N/A
Majority			1,363,019	29.52%	▼9.06%
Totals			4,769,741	100.00%	
Democratic hold					

2013 New York City mayoral election
Party	Candidate	Votes	%	±%
Democratic	Bill de Blasio	753,039	69.23%	+25.3%
Working Families	Bill de Blasio	42,640	3.92%	+1.5%
Total	Bill de Blasio	795,679	73.15%	+26.9%
Republican	Joe Lhota	236,212	21.72%	−16.0%
Conservative	Joe Lhota	24,888	2.29%	+0.7%
Taxes 2 High	Joe Lhota	2,500	0.23%	N/A
Students First	Joe Lhota	820	0.08%	N/A
Total	Joe Lhota	264,420	24.31%	−26.4%
Independence	Adolfo Carrion	8,675	0.80%	−12.2%
Green	Anthony Gronowicz	4,983	0.46%	−0.3%
Jobs & Education	Jack Hidary	2,922	0.27%	N/A
Common Sense	Jack Hidary	718	0.07%	N/A
Total	Jack Hidary	3,640	0.33%	N/A
Rent Is Too Damn High	Jimmy McMillan	1,990	0.18%	0.0%
School Choice	Erick Salgado	1,946	0.18%	N/A
Libertarian	Michael Sanchez	1,746	0.16%	+0.1%
Socialist Workers	Dan Fein	758	0.07%	0.0%
Tax Wall Street	Randy Credico	690	0.06%	N/A
Freedom Party	Michael K. Greys	575	0.05%	N/A
Reform	Carl Person	306	0.03%	N/A
Affordable Tomorrow	Joseph Melaragno	289	0.03%	N/A
War Veterans	Sam Sloan	166	0.02%	
Flourish Every Person	Michael J. Dilger	55	0.01%	N/A
Write-in		1,792	0.16%	N/A
Total votes		1,087,710	100.00%	N/A
Democratic gain from Independent		Swing	53.2%	
