= 2010 New York gubernatorial election =

- November 2, 2010
- Turnout: 35.5% ▲0.6pp
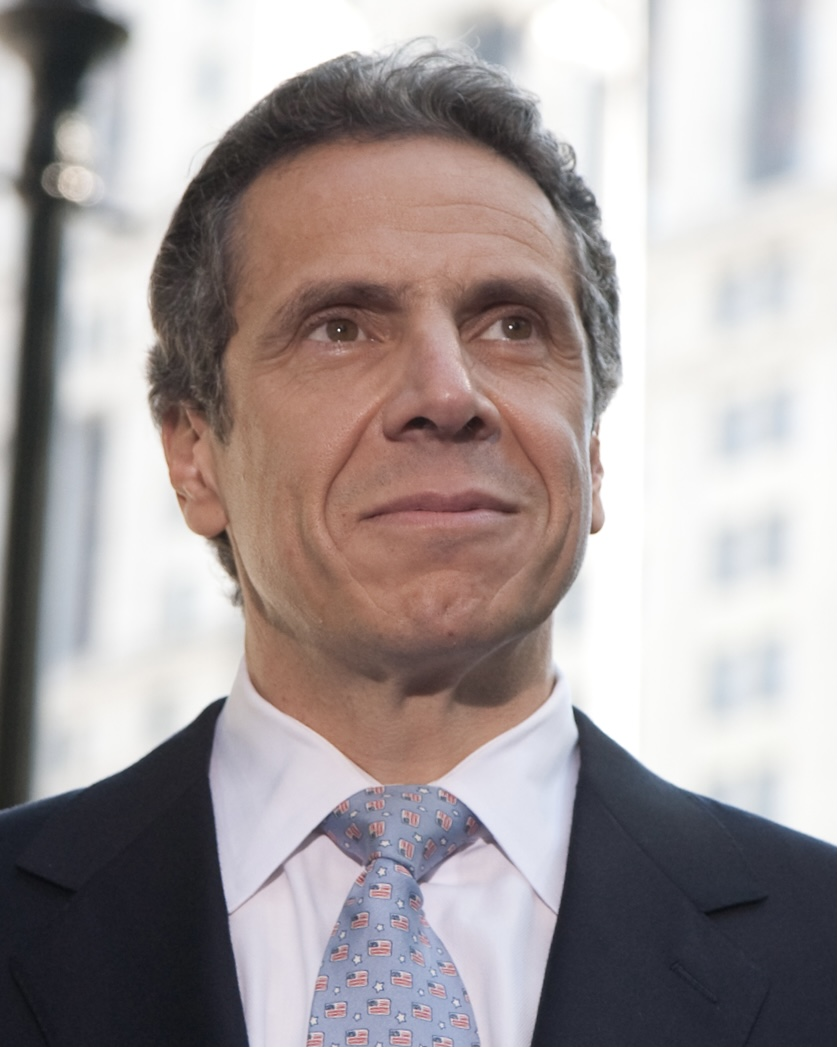

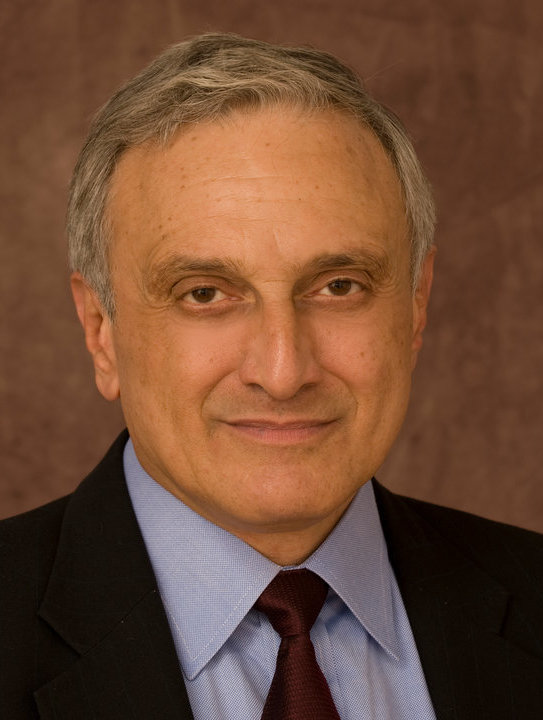
Nominee	Andrew Cuomo	Carl Paladino
Party	Democratic	Republican
Alliance	Parties: Working Families; Independence	Parties: Conservative; Taxpayers
Running mate	Robert Duffy	Greg Edwards
Popular vote	2,910,876	1,547,857
Percentage	62.49%	33.23%
- County results Cuomo: 40–50% 50–60% 60–70% 70–80% 80–90% Paladino: 40–50% 50–60% 60–70%
Governor before election
David Paterson
Democratic
Elected Governor
Andrew Cuomo
Democratic

The 2010 New York gubernatorial election was held on Tuesday, November 2, 2010. Incumbent Democratic governor David Paterson, who was elected as lieutenant governor in 2006 as the running mate of Eliot Spitzer, and became governor in 2008 following Spitzer's resignation, initially ran for a full term but withdrew in February 2010. Democratic New York Attorney General Andrew Cuomo defeated Republican Carl Paladino to become the next governor of New York. Cuomo dominated downstate New York and won a majority of upstate counties, while Paladino did well in his home region of Buffalo, winning Democratic-leaning Erie County.

The results of New York's gubernatorial elections are used to decide which parties receive automatic ballot access and in what order the parties are listed on the ballot. Parties whose candidates for governor receive over 50,000 votes on that party's line receive automatic ballot access for the next four years until the next gubernatorial election. This rule applies regardless of whether the party fielded its own candidate or cross-endorsed the candidate of another party. Green Party candidate Howie Hawkins received over 57,000 votes, allowing the New York Green Party to be listed on the ballot for the following four years.

As of 2026, this is the last time that Erie County voted Republican in a gubernatorial election, as well as the last time that any candidate won over 60% of the vote in a gubernatorial election. This is also the last time Democrats won the following counties in a gubernatorial election: Cayuga, Chemung, Chenango, Cortland, Delaware, Greene, Herkimer, Jefferson, Lewis, Livingston, Madison, Montgomery, Oneida, Orange, Oswego, Otsego, Putnam, St. Lawrence, Schuyler, Seneca, Sullivan, Warren, Washington, Wayne, and Yates. This is the most recent New York gubernatorial election in which the winner won a majority of counties, as well as the last election without an incumbent running.

== Democratic primary ==
=== Candidates ===
==== Nominee ====
- Andrew Cuomo, Attorney General of New York, Former Secretary of Housing and Urban Development, and son of former governor Mario Cuomo

==== Withdrew ====
- David Paterson, incumbent Governor of New York (withdrew February 26, 2010)

==== Failed to qualify ====
- Jimmy McMillan, founder of the Rent Is Too Damn High Party
- Joel Tyner, Dutchess County legislator

Incumbent Democratic governor David Paterson had announced that he was running for election in 2009. Paterson had been elected lieutenant governor of New York in 2006, and was sworn in as governor on March 17, 2008. On September 18, 2009, advisors to President Barack Obama informed Paterson that the President believed Paterson should withdraw his gubernatorial candidacy and clear a path for "popular Attorney General Andrew Cuomo" to run. Paterson insisted he was still running, and reiterated his position on February 9, 2010. On February 26, 2010, however, Paterson withdrew his bid for a full term as governor of New York "amid crumbling support from his party and an uproar over his administration’s intervention in a domestic violence case involving a close aide".

Democratic New York State Attorney General Andrew Cuomo was widely rumored to be considering a 2010 gubernatorial bid. Though he had originally denied any interest, this did not stop rampant speculation that Cuomo would change his mind and enter the race. By December, Cuomo had a massive lead over Paterson in the polls, had higher approval and favorability ratings, and decisively beat any Republican challenger in every poll. After over a year of dodging speculation, Cuomo finally announced his candidacy on May 22, 2010, outside the Tweed Courthouse at New York's City Hall.

Dutchess County legislator Joel Tyner ran an unsuccessful petition drive that fell short of the 15,000 signatures necessary to get onto the primary ballot.

Rent Is Too Damn High Party founder Jimmy McMillan filed petitions to appear on the Democratic primary ballot and the Rent Is Too Damn High line. However, he put very little effort into the Democratic petitions, and the vast majority of the 13,350 signatures bearing his name were collected by Randy Credico, who had partnered with McMillan for a joint Democratic petition. Credico had counted on McMillan to collect 10,000 signatures to put his total at over 20,000, above the 15,000 required to get onto the ballot, but McMillan never followed through, leaving both candidates short of the necessary signatures to force a Democratic primary against Cuomo, who was thus unopposed. Credico, in response, called McMillan a "jack-off" and a "sorry ass", accusing him of "working against me", "turn[ing] in a wagonload of blank pages and then [leaving] Albany in brand new automobiles."

==== Polling ====
Poll source	Dates administered	David Paterson	Andrew Cuomo
Siena Poll	January 10–14, 2010	21%	59%
Quinnipiac	December 7–13, 2009	23%	60%
Rasmussen Reports	July 14, 2009	27%	61%
Qunnipiac	May 5–11, 2009	17%	62%
Qunnipiac	April 1–5, 2009	18%	61%
Siena Poll	March 13–16, 2009	17%	67%
Marist Poll	February 25–26, 2009	26%	62%
Siena Poll	February 16–18, 2009	27%	53%
Quinnipiac	February 10–15, 2009	23%	55%
Siena Poll	January 20–23, 2009	35%	33%
Siena Poll	December 8–11, 2008	49%	26%
Siena Poll	November 10–13, 2008	53%	25%
Siena Poll	July 7–10, 2008	51%	21%
Siena Poll	May 12–15, 2008	42%	29%
Siena Poll	April 12–15, 2008	35%	30%

==== Results ====
Cuomo was unopposed for the Democratic nomination.

=== Lieutenant governor ===
Unelected lieutenant governor Richard Ravitch did not seek election in 2010.

Cuomo selected Rochester mayor Bob Duffy as his running mate on May 26, 2010. Other Democrats mentioned as potential candidates include Ramapo town supervisor Christopher St. Lawrence, State Senator Andrea Stewart-Cousins (D-Yonkers), Buffalo mayor Byron Brown, State Senator Darrel Aubertine, and Canandaigua businessman Bill Samuels.

== Republican primary ==
=== Candidates ===
==== Nominee ====
- Carl Paladino, Buffalo developer and political activist

==== Lost nomination ====
- Rick Lazio, former congressman, 2000 Republican nominee for U.S. Senate, and official party designee
- Warren Redlich, attorney and Libertarian Party gubernatorial nominee
- Steven A. Levy, Suffolk County executive
- Myers Mermel, real estate developer

On September 21, 2009, former Long Island Congressman and 2000 Republican U.S. Senate nominee Rick Lazio declared his 2010 candidacy for governor of New York; Lazio made a formal announcement in Albany, New York the following day. Lazio was the frontrunner for the Republican nomination.

Other potential 2010 Republican gubernatorial candidates included former New York City Mayor Rudy Giuliani and Erie County Executive Chris Collins. In April 2009, a Quinnipiac poll showed Giuliani slightly ahead of incumbent David Paterson. Giuliani stated in June 2009 that he was considering running. In December 2009, Giuliani announced that he would not run and would instead back Lazio. On January 26, 2010, Collins announced that he would not run; he did not endorse Lazio, and instead encouraged the Party to choose someone else.

On March 19, 2010, Steve Levy, the county executive of Suffolk County, announced that he would run for governor as a Republican. Republican Party Chairman Ed Cox threw his support to Levy.

After Collins passed on the race, activist Rus Thompson persuaded developer Carl Paladino to consider running for governor. In March 2010, Paladino was strongly considering a run and was said to be willing to spend $10,000,000 of his own money on a campaign. He advised state Republican Party chairman Edward F. Cox of his intentions. Paladino announced his candidacy on April 5, 2010.

At the June 2010 Republican Convention, Lazio won the support of 59% of the delegates and was designated the Party's candidate for Governor. Levy "received 28 percent [of the vote] on the first ballot, squeaking above the 25 percent threshold needed to force a second vote on his authorization. While he [had] signed a Republican registration form, Levy [remained] an enrolled Democrat. As such, a separate vote authorizing his appearance in a primary was held: Levy garnered the support of 42.66 percent of the delegates, short of the 50 percent required". Paladino received eight percent of the vote, and real estate consultant Myers Mermel received four percent. On July 15, 2010, Paladino mounted a primary challenge against Lazio by filing petitions. He filed enough petitions to be placed on the ballot for the Republican primary.

By September 2010, Lazio and Paladino were nearly tied in the most polls, with Paladino having a significant edge in Upstate New York and Lazio leading heavily in Downstate New York. Paladino was supported heavily by the Tea Party movement. On September 14, 2010, Paladino upset Lazio by a nearly two-to-one margin in the primary.

==== Polling ====
Poll source	Dates administered	Rick Lazio	Steve Levy	Carl Paladino
Siena Poll	September 7–9, 2010	42%	–	41%
Quinnipiac	July 20–26, 2010	39%	–	23%
Siena Poll	May 17–20, 2010	29%	14%	16%
Marist Poll	May 3–5, 2010	38%	22%	13%
Siena Poll	April 12–15, 2010	29%	15%	13%
Quinnipiac	April 6–11, 2010	34%	11%	11%
Marist Poll	March 23–24, 2010	53%	21%	–
Siena Poll	March 15–18, 2010	60%	19%	–

==== Results ====
Republican primary results by county: Paladino: 50–60%; 60–70%; 70–80%; 80–90%; 90–100%; Lazio: 50–60%; 60–70%

Republican primary results
Party	Candidate	Votes	%
Republican	Carl Paladino	295,336	61.57
Republican	Rick Lazio	184,348	38.43
Total votes		479,684	100.00

=== Lieutenant governor ===
On the Republican side, Lazio endorsed Chautauqua County executive Greg Edwards as his choice for lieutenant governor on May 17, 2010. Tom Ognibene, former minority leader of the New York City Council, was Paladino's running mate. Other Republicans mentioned as potential candidates included Orange County executive Edward A. Diana, Monroe County executive Maggie Brooks, former New York Secretary of State Christopher Jacobs (Steve Levy's preferred running mate), Onondaga County executive Joanie Mahoney, 2006 lieutenant governor candidate C. Scott Vanderhoef (who instead ran for State Senate), and Myers Mermel (who later opted to run for governor instead). Edwards narrowly defeated Tom Ognibene, creating a split ticket in which Lazio's preferred running mate became Paladino's running mate in the general election.

Republican primary results by county: Edwards: Edwards—50–60%; Edwards—60–70%; Edwards—70–80%; Ognibene: Ognibene—50–60%; Ognibene—60–70%; Ognibene—70–80%

Lieutenant Governor Republican primary results
Party	Candidate	Votes	%
Republican	Gregory Edwards	227,093	52.91
Republican	Thomas Ognibene	202,081	47.09
Total votes		429,174	100.00

== Independents and third parties ==
=== Conservative Party ===
Lazio received the endorsement of the Conservative Party's executive committee in March 2010, with 14 party chairs in favor, four backing Steve Levy, and one (Erie County's Ralph Lorigo) backing Carl Paladino. At the Conservative Party convention in May 2010, Ralph Lorigo united with Steve Levy supporters to act as a placeholder on the ballot and earned 42% of the weighted ballot; by being a registered party member, he only needed 25% to force a primary election (something that Levy and Paladino, as a Democrat and Republican respectively, could not do). After Lorigo entered the gubernatorial race, Long demanded Lorigo's resignation; Lorigo responded by offering to wager the party chairmanship on the results of the race: If Lorigo won the primary, Long would resign and allow Lorigo (party second-in-command) to succeed him as Conservative Party chairman, but if Lazio won, Lorigo would resign his position within the Party.

On September 14, 2010, Lazio defeated Lorigo in the Conservative primary. Following Lazio's loss to Paladino in the GOP gubernatorial primary, Chairman Long indicated that he planned to move forward with Lazio; however, on September 27, 2010, Lazio confirmed that he would drop his bid for governor by accepting a nomination for a judicial position in the Bronx. The Conservative Party then nominated Paladino as its candidate for governor.

==== Results ====
Conservative primary results by county: Lazio: Lazio—50–60%; Lazio—60–70%; Lazio—70–80%; Lazio—80–90%; Lorigo: Lorigo—50–60%; Lorigo—60–70%; Lorigo—70–80%; Tie: Tie—50%

Conservative primary results
Party	Candidate	Votes	%
Conservative	Rick Lazio	11,465	60.18
Conservative	Ralph Lorigo	7,586	39.82
Total votes		19,051	100.00

Nominee

- Carl Paladino

Candidates

- Rick Lazio, Republican nominee, won the primary but withdrew.
- Ralph Lorigo, chairman of the Erie County Conservative Party.

=== Independence Party ===
The Independence Party of New York publicly endorsed presumptive Democratic nominee Andrew Cuomo prior to the party convention.

Nominee

- Andrew Cuomo

=== Working Families Party ===
The Working Families Party was said to heavily favor Cuomo, but was reportedly concerned that the party's damaged reputation may cause Cuomo to decline any nomination from them. In somewhat of a surprise move, the party nominated its own members for all but one statewide elected office, and did not cross-endorse Democrats as usual. The party nominated United Auto Workers lawyer Kenneth Schaffer as its nominee for governor in June 2010. After the federal investigation against the party was closed with no charges, speculation has run rampant that the party will vacate the line in favor of Cuomo by nominating Schaeffer for a judicial position and offering Cuomo a Wilson Pakula, which the party did unanimously in September 2010.

Nominee

- Andrew Cuomo

=== Libertarian Party ===
The Libertarian Party of New York chose Warren Redlich as its nominee at the state party convention on April 24, 2010.

Nominee

- Warren Redlich, Guilderland Town Board member and criminal defense attorney.

Lost nomination

- Kristin Davis, madam of the prostitution ring of which Eliot Spitzer was a client Davis refused to show up at the convention and as a result did not appear on the ballot.
- Sam Sloan, author and board game expert.

=== Green Party ===
The Green Party of New York nominated national party co-founder Howie Hawkins, who had been a perennial candidate in state and federal elections since 2006, as its candidate at the party convention on May 15, 2010.

Nominee

- Howie Hawkins

=== Rent Is Too Damn High Party ===
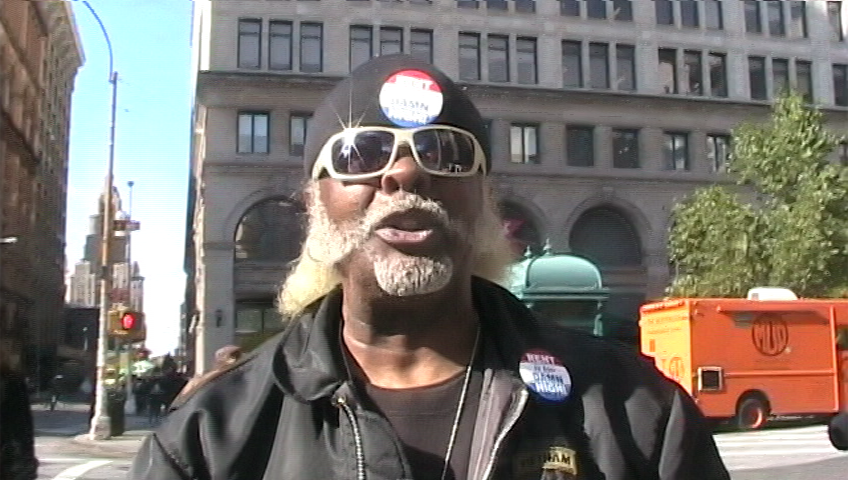
Jimmy McMillan, "Rent is Too Damn High"

The Rent Is Too Damn High Party, whose perennial New York City mayoral candidate was Jimmy McMillan, fielded him in the New York gubernatorial election in 2010.

=== Campaign signatures ===
The Paladino campaign submitted 30,000 signatures for its Taxpayers Party. Charles Barron submitted 43,500 signatures for the Freedom Party, though a fellow New York City councilman, Lewis Fidler, has already announced his intention to challenge Barron's signatures. The Davis campaign submitted 22,000 signatures, the Hawkins campaign filed 27,000, and the Libertarian Party claimed to have submitted over 34,000.

== General election ==
=== Predictions ===
Source	Ranking	As of
Cook Political Report	Safe D	October 14, 2010
Rothenberg	Safe D	October 28, 2010
RealClearPolitics	Likely D	November 1, 2010
Sabato's Crystal Ball	Safe D	October 28, 2010
CQ Politics	Likely D	October 28, 2010

=== Polling ===
Poll source	Dates administered	Sample size	Margin of error	Andrew Cuomo (D)	Carl Paladino (R)	Other	Undecided
Angus Reid Public Opinion	October 28–29, 2010	546 LV	±4.2%	55%	38%	5%	––
Rasmussen	October 22, 2010	943 RV	±3.0%	51%	37%	2%	12%
The New York Times	October 17–19, 2010	943 RV	±3.0%	67%	24%	2%	12%
The New York Times	October 10–15, 2010	943 RV	±3.0%	59%	24%	2%	12%
Survey USA /Gannett	October 11–13, 2010	633 LV	±3.9%	59%	33%	6%	3%
Survey USA /Gannett	October 5–7, 2010	627 LV	±4.0%	57%	34%	5%	3%
Angus Reid Public Opinion	October 5–7, 2010	500 RV	±4.5%	63%	32%	6%	––
Quinnipiac	October 1–5, 2010	1,141 LV	±2.9%	55%	37%	2%	6%
CNN /Opinion Research	October 1–5, 2010	585 LV	±4.0%	55%	41%	2%	1%
CNN /Opinion Research	October 1–5, 2010	1,315 RV	±2.5%	65%	31%	2%	1%
Siena Poll	October 3–4, 2010	636 LV	±3.9%	56%	32%	––	11%
Public Policy Polling	October 1–3, 2010	592 LV	±4.0%	53%	38%	––	8%
Marist Poll	September 27–29, 2010	591 LV	±4.0%	53%	38%	1%	8%
Survey USA/Gannett	September 20–21, 2010	572 LV	±4.2%	49%	40%	8%	3%
Quinnipiac	September 16–20, 2010	751 LV	±3.6%	49%	43%	1%	7%
Rasmussen Reports	September 20, 2010	500 LV	±4.5%	54%	38%	2%	6%
Quinnipiac	August 23–29, 2010	1,497 RV	±2.5%	60%	23%	1%	14%
Siena Poll	August 9–16, 2010	788 RV	±3.5%	60%	27%	––	13%
Quinnipiac	July 20–26, 2010	1,165 RV	±2.9%	55%	25%	1%	16%
Rasmussen Reports	July 20, 2010	500 LV	±4.5%	58%	29%	5%	8%
Rasmussen Reports	June 24, 2010	500 LV	±4.5%	55%	25%	6%	13%
Siena Poll	May 17–20, 2010	905 RV	±3.3%	65%	22%	––	13%
Marist Poll	May 3–5, 2010	686 RV	±4.0%	67%	22%	––	11%
Rasmussen Reports	April 27, 2010	500 LV	±4.5%	55%	25%	5%	15%
Quinnipiac	April 6–11, 2010	1,381 RV	±2.6%	60%	24%	1%	14%
Rasmussen Reports	March 29, 2010	500 LV	±4.5%	51%	28%	6%	15%
Rasmussen Reports	March 1, 2010	500 LV	±4.5%	56%	27%	6%	11%

Hypothetical polling

with Collins

Poll source	Dates administered	Andrew Cuomo	Chris Collins
Siena Poll	January 10–14, 2010	65%	23%

with Lazio

Poll source	Dates administered	Andrew Cuomo	Rick Lazio
Quinnipiac	July 20–26, 2010	56%	26%
Rasmussen Reports	July 20, 2010	58%	27%
Siena Poll	July 12, 2010	60%	28%
Rasmussen Reports	June 24, 2010	55%	28%
Quinnipiac	June 22, 2010	58%	26%
Siena Poll	June 9, 2010	60%	24%
Siena Poll	May 17–20, 2010	66%	24%
Marist Poll	May 3–5, 2010	65%	25%
Rasmussen Reports	April 27, 2010	56%	24%
Siena Poll	April 12–15, 2010	61%	24%
Quinnipiac	April 6–11, 2010	55%	26%
Rasmussen Reports	March 29, 2010	52%	29%
Marist Poll	March 23–24, 2010	61%	30%
Siena Poll	March 15–18, 2010	59%	21%
Rasmussen Reports	March 2, 2010	55%	30%
Rasmussen Reports	January 18, 2010	54%	35%
Siena Poll	January 10–14, 2010	66%	24%
Quinnipiac	December 7–13, 2009	62%	22%
Rasmussen Reports	November 17, 2009	57%	29%
Rasmussen Reports	September 22, 2009	65%	26%
Marist Poll	February 25–26, 2009	71%	20%

with Lazio and Paladino

Poll source	Dates administered	Andrew Cuomo	Rick Lazio	Carl Paladino	Others
Marist Poll	September 23, 2010	52%	9%	33%	
Siena Poll	May 17–20, 2010	43%	4%	5%	13% (Note: David Paterson with 5%, Rudy Giuliani with 5%, and Steve Levy with 3%)
Rasmussen Reports	March 2, 2010	50%	19%	15%	

with Levy

Poll source	Dates administered	Andrew Cuomo	Steve Levy	
Siena Poll	May 17–20, 2010	65%	22%	
Marist Poll	May 3–5, 2010	63%	25%	
Rasmussen Reports	April 27, 2010	50%	27%	
Siena Poll	April 12–15, 2010	58%	23%	
Quinnipiac	April 6–11, 2010	57%	24%	
Rasmussen Reports	March 29, 2010	50%	26%	
Marist Poll	March 23–24, 2010	65%	26%	
Siena Poll	March 15–18, 2010	63%	16%	Warren Redlich: 4%

Collins v. Patterson

Poll source	Dates administered	David Paterson	Chris Collins
Siena Poll	January 10–14, 2010	40%	40%
Rasmussen Reports	December 22, 2009	38%	42%

Giuliani vs. Paterson

Poll source	Dates administered	Rudy Giuliani	David Paterson
Marist Poll	September 8–10, 2009	60%	34%

Lazio vs. Paterson

Poll source	Dates administered	David Paterson	Rick Lazio
Rasmussen Reports	January 18, 2010	38%	45%
Siena Poll	January 10–14, 2010	42%	42%
Rasmussen Reports	December 22, 2009	40%	43%
Quinnipiac	December 7–13, 2009	41%	37%
Rasmussen Reports	November 17, 2009	37%	41%
Marist	November 15, 2009	36%	39%
Rasmussen Reports	September 22, 2009	38%	38%
Marist	May 4, 2009	37%	40%

=== Results ===
Gubernatorial election in New York, 2010
Party	Candidate	Running mate	Votes	Percentage	Swing
Democratic	Andrew Cuomo		2,609,465	56.02%	▼5.75%
Working Families	Andrew Cuomo		154,835	3.32%	▼0.18%
Independence	Andrew Cuomo		146,576	3.15%	▼1.15%
Total	Andrew Cuomo	Robert Duffy	2,910,876	62.49%	▼7.07%
Republican	Carl Paladino		1,289,817	27.69%	▲2.77%
Conservative	Carl Paladino		232,215	4.99%	▲1.19%
Taxpayers	Carl Paladino		25,825	0.55%	N/A
Total	Carl Paladino	Greg Edwards	1,547,857	33.23%	▲4.51%
Green	Howie Hawkins	Gloria Mattera	59,906	1.29%	▲0.34%
Libertarian	Warren Redlich	Alden Link	48,359	1.04%	▲0.71%
Rent Is Too Damn High	Jimmy McMillan	James D. Schultz	41,129	0.88%	▲0.58%
Freedom	Charles Barron	Eva M. Doyle	24,571	0.53%	N/A
Anti-Prohibition	Kristin M. Davis	Tanya Gendelman	20,421	0.44%	N/A
	Scattering		4,836	0.10%	
Majority			1,363,019	29.26%	▼11.58%
Totals			4,657,955	100.00%	
Democratic hold					

==== New York City results ====
2010 gubernatorial election in New York City		Manhattan	The Bronx	Brooklyn	Queens	Staten Island	Total	
Democratic	Andrew Cuomo	300,272	154,500	320,222	267,266	55,532	1,097,792	80.3%
Democratic	Andrew Cuomo	85.2%	87.7%	80.1%	78.3%	57.1%	1,097,792	80.3%
Republican	Carl Paladino	35,295	16,032	60,198	62,003	38,895	212,423	15.5%
Republican	Carl Paladino	10.0%	9.1%	15.1%	18.2%	40.0%	212,423	15.5%

==== Results by county ====
County	Andrew Cuomo Democratic		Carl Paladino Republican		Various candidates		Margin		Total votes cast
County	#	%	#	%	#	%	#	%	Total votes cast
Albany	65,798	64.0%	28,076	27.3%	8,865	8.7%	37,222	36.7%	102,739
Allegany	4,470	33.9%	8,353	63.3%	376	2.9%	−3,883	−29.4%	13,199
Bronx	154,500	87.7%	16,032	9.1%	5,668	3.2%	138,468	78.6%	176,200
Broome	33,761	55.2%	25,214	41.2%	2,156	3.5%	8,547	14.0%	61,131
Cattaraugus	6,997	31.5%	14,554	65.5%	685	3.1%	-7,557	-34.0%	22,236
Cayuga	12,067	53.7%	9,141	40.7%	1,246	5.6%	2,926	13.0%	22,454
Chautauqua	14,022	35.2%	24,593	61.8%	1,170	2.9%	-10,571	-26.6%	39,785
Chemung	12,972	53.1%	10,925	44.7%	551	2.3%	2,047	8.4%	24,448
Chenango	7,231	51.6%	6,126	43.7%	648	4.6%	1,105	7.9%	14,005
Clinton	15,316	66.6%	7,155	31.1%	518	2.2%	8,161	35.5%	22,989
Columbia	13,952	58.7%	8,402	35.4%	1,403	5.9%	5,550	23.3%	23,757
Cortland	7,715	55.5%	5,424	39.0%	752	5.4%	2,291	16.5%	13,981
Delaware	6,698	48.7%	6,350	46.2%	696	5.1%	348	2.5%	13,744
Dutchess	48,165	55.8%	34,874	40.4%	3,303	4.1%	13,291	15.4%	86,342
Erie	113,459	37.6%	176,690	58.5%	11,712	3.9%	-63,231	-20.9%	301,861
Essex	7,991	61.8%	4,464	34.5%	480	3.8%	3,527	27.3%	12,935
Franklin	8,144	66.4%	3,699	30.2%	416	3.4%	4,445	36.2%	12,259
Fulton	7,009	46.6%	7,307	48.6%	711	4.7%	-298	-2.0%	15,027
Genesee	6,668	37.3%	10,619	59.4%	589	3.3%	-3,951	-22.1%	17,876
Greene	7,904	48.7%	7,553	46.5%	769	4.7%	351	2.2%	16,226
Hamilton	1,100	42.1%	1,373	52.5%	141	5.4%	−273	−10.4%	2,614
Herkimer	9,942	50.9%	8,840	45.2%	765	3.9%	1,102	5.7%	19,547
Jefferson	15,762	58.4%	9,760	36.2%	1,451	5.4%	6,002	22.2%	26,973
Kings	320,222	80.1%	60,198	15.1%	19,224	4.8%	260,024	65.0%	399,644
Lewis	3,842	52.2%	3,210	43.6%	309	4.1%	632	8.6%	7,361
Livingston	9,919	50.6%	9,069	46.2%	622	3.2%	850	4.4%	19,610
Madison	10,862	51.4%	8,657	41.0%	1,614	7.6%	2,205	10.4%	21,133
Monroe	141,765	61.7%	80,363	35.0%	7,753	3.3%	61,402	26.7%	229,881
Montgomery	6,805	48.7%	6,487	46.4%	677	4.8%	318	2.3%	13,969
Nassau	233,349	60.5%	139,432	36.2%	12,915	3.4%	93,917	24.3%	385,696
New York	300,272	85.2%	35,295	10.0%	17,013	4.8%	264,977	75.2%	352,580
Niagara	21,237	32.3%	42,553	64.7%	1,949	3.0%	-21,316	-32.4%	65,739
Oneida	35,651	52.5%	29,469	43.4%	2,848	4.2%	6,182	9.1%	67,968
Onondaga	84,281	58.8%	46,308	32.3%	12,814	8.9%	37,973	26.5%	143,403
Ontario	18,436	54.1%	14,525	42.6%	1,140	3.3%	3,911	11.5%	34,101
Orange	53,631	55.5%	38,938	40.3%	4,089	4.2%	14,693	15.2%	96,658
Orleans	4,252	37.7%	6,716	59.6%	309	2.7%	−2,464	−21.9%	11,277
Oswego	17,101	53.9%	12,259	38.6%	2,393	7.6%	4,842	15.3%	31,753
Otsego	9,899	54.5%	7,459	41.1%	809	4.5%	2,440	13.4%	18,167
Putnam	16,508	51.7%	14,309	44.8%	1,113	3.5%	2,199	6.9%	31,930
Queens	267,266	78.3%	62,003	18.2%	12,018	3.5%	205,263	60.1%	341,287
Rensselaer	30,249	55.8%	19,886	36.7%	4,092	7.6%	10,363	19.1%	54,227
Richmond	55,532	57.1%	38,895	40.0%	2,844	3.0%	16,637	17.1%	97,271
Rockland	51,334	59.9%	32,118	37.5%	2,273	2.6%	19,216	22.4%	85,725
St. Lawrence	18,865	64.4%	9,334	32.2%	1,000	3.4%	9,351	32.2%	29,019
Saratoga	43,535	53.2%	32,690	39.9%	5,642	6.9%	10,845	13.3%	81,867
Schenectady	27,942	57.7%	17,100	35.3%	3,351	6.9%	10,842	22.4%	48,393
Schoharie	4,874	46.3%	5,019	47.7%	627	5.9%	-145	-1.4%	10,520
Schuyler	2,922	49.1%	2,829	47.5%	202	3.4%	93	1.6%	5,953
Seneca	5,640	56.0%	4,066	40.4%	369	3.6%	1,574	15.6%	10,075
Steuben	12,928	47.0%	13,787	50.1%	805	3.9%	−859	−3.1%	27,520
Suffolk	227,374	57.7%	152,813	38.8%	13,692	3.5%	74,561	18.9%	394,149
Sullivan	11,800	55.3%	8,363	39.2%	1,174	5.6%	3,437	16.1%	21,337
Tioga	7,467	46.3%	8,051	50.0%	594	3.7%	-584	-3.7%	16,112
Tompkins	20,314	69.6%	7,237	24.8%	1,654	5.7%	13,077	44.8%	29,205
Ulster	35,750	59.3%	21,027	34.9%	3,470	5.8%	14,723	24.4%	60,247
Warren	12,351	53.7%	9,365	40.7%	1,300	5.7%	2,986	13.0%	23,016
Washington	9,485	52.0%	7,669	42.0%	1,093	5.9%	1,816	10.0%	18,247
Wayne	13,769	50.8%	12,442	45.9%	886	3.3%	1,327	4.9%	27,097
Westchester	174,746	66.2%	80,475	30.5%	8,589	3.5%	94,271	35.7%	263,810
Wyoming	3,599	28.4%	8,678	68.4%	417	3.3%	−5,079	−40.0%	12,694
Yates	3,639	51.4%	3,239	45.8%	198	2.8%	400	5.6%	7,076
Totals	2,910,876	62.5%	1,547,857	33.2%	199,222	4.3%	1,363,019	29.3%	4,657,955

Counties that flipped from Democratic to Republican

- Cattaraugus (largest municipality: Olean)
- Chautauqua (largest municipality: Jamestown)
- Erie (largest municipality: Buffalo)
- Fulton (largest municipality: Gloversville)
- Genesee (largest municipality: Batavia)
- Niagara (largest municipality: Niagara Falls)
- Schoharie (largest municipality: Cobleskill)
- Steuben (largest municipality: Corning)
- Tioga (largest municipality: Waverly)

== See also ==
- Paterson, David "Black, Blind, & In Charge: A Story of Visionary Leadership and Overcoming Adversity." New York, New York, 2020
