= Rent Is Too Damn High Party =

American political party

- Leader: Jimmy McMillan
- Founded: 2005
- Headquarters: Flatbush, Brooklyn, New York City
- Ideology: Anti-tax; Populism; Rent regulation Social welfare
- Colors: Purple
- Slogan: "The rent is too damn high."

The Rent Is Too Damn High Party (stylised as Rent Is 2 Damn High Party) is a single issue political party, primarily active in the state of New York, that has nominated candidates for mayor of New York City in 2005 and 2009, and for governor and senator in 2010. Jimmy McMillan was the mayoral candidate both times as well as a candidate for governor. In 2005, he received more than 4,000 votes, and more than 40,000 in 2010. The party has three registered members in the state. McMillan himself is registered as a Republican (previously a Democrat) for the purposes of running in that party's primary elections. McMillan is a perennial candidate, and no candidate has ever been elected to public office running for the party.

In 2014, the party expanded beyond New York by endorsing a slate of candidates in the District of Columbia's Democratic primary elections. On December 1, 2015, founder Jimmy McMillan announced his retirement from politics and put the party's trademarks up for sale.

== Platform ==
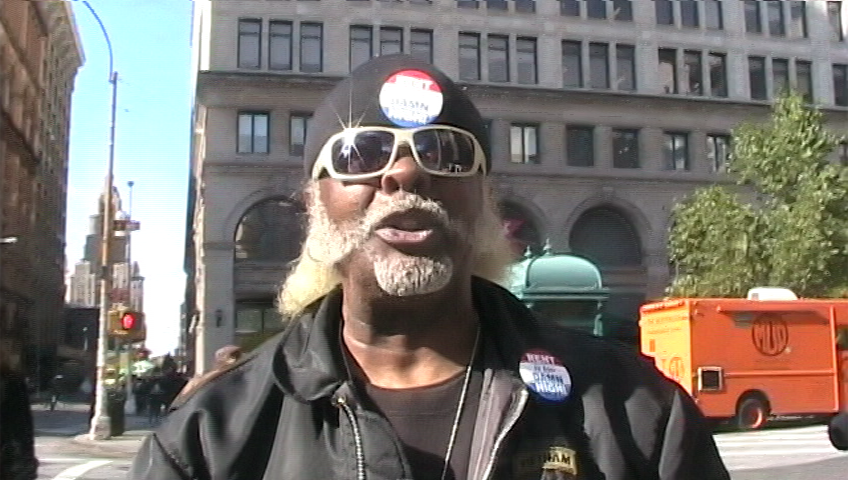
Jimmy McMillan, founder of the Rent is Too Damn High Party

As its name implies, the central tenet of the Rent Is Too Damn High Party is that rents in the City of New York are "too damn high."

One of the taglines for the party is "breakfast, lunch, and dinner", indicating that the party seeks to end hunger and poverty in New York City. The party, prior to McMillan's breakthrough debate performance, sought to win "without a single vote from upstate New York," and the party website included a picture of New York with a giant "X" marked over upstate. McMillan surmises that reducing rent would "create 3 to 6 million jobs", freeing up capital to give businesses a chance to hire people. This would, in turn, increase tax revenue. The party is in favor of writing off all taxes owed to the state, cutting property taxes for homeowners, consolidating the rent boards in New York, seizing unoccupied apartment buildings, reforming the state court system, and providing tax credits for commuters and free college tuition. The party opposes any cuts in spending related to education and elderly care.

== Humor ==
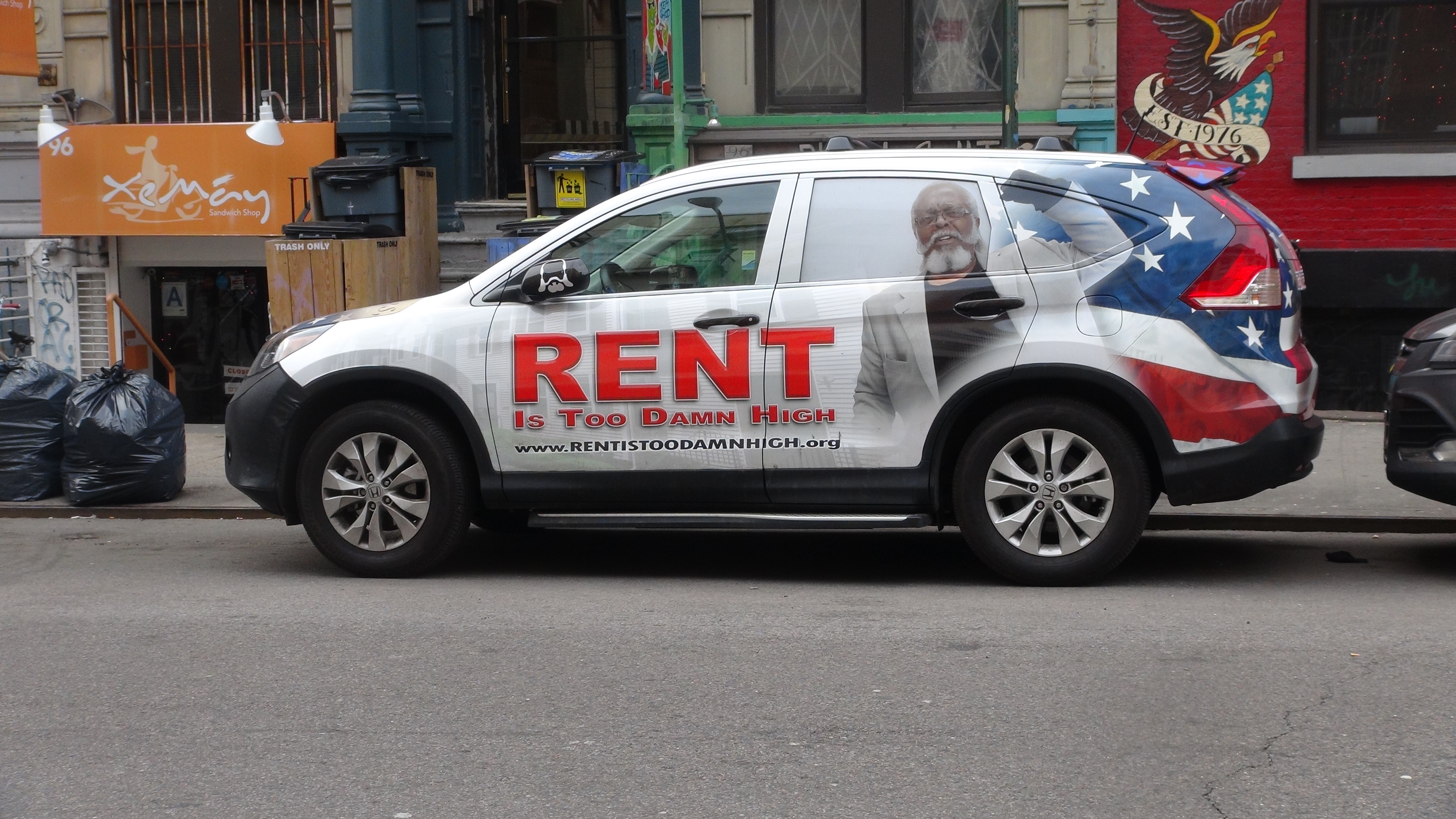
Rent Is Too Damn High Party car parked on St Marks Place

McMillan uses humor to promote the party's message, especially utilizing what the Christian Science Monitor has described as "theatrics", including "a booming voice, fast-paced patter ... and copious facial hair", as well as frequent jokes. Although the party adopts a jocular and tongue-in-cheek image, the party has focused primarily on serious welfare issues and avoided outright satire, precluding it from being considered a frivolous political party. McMillan's style has turned him into an internet meme. Parodies have aired on TV.

== Elections ==
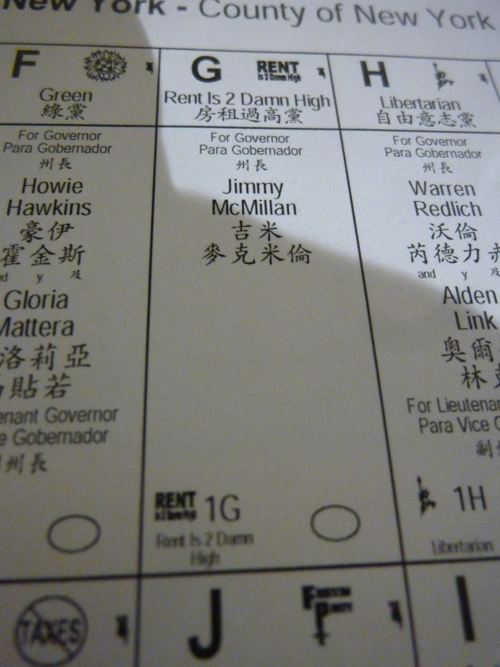
A ballot paper from the New York gubernatorial election, 2010, including Chinese translations, focusing on the area to mark a vote for the Rent is 2 Damn High Party.

For the 2009 mayoral campaign, the word "damn" was removed from the official ballot on account of the party's 17-letter name, two more than legally permissible under state board of elections guidelines. McMillan objected to the change, stating that he purposely used the profane word "damn" for its shock value. In 2009, Salim Ejaz ran for the party for the position of City Comptroller, without an endorsement from McMillan.

The word "damn" was restored to the party's ballot line in 2010 by shortening "too" to "2". McMillan ran for governor on the line, while Joseph Huff ran for the U.S. Senate seat held by Kirsten Gillibrand. Neither were successful.

Under the numeric moniker, the party also ran McMillan in the 2013 mayoral election and submitted petitions for the 2014 gubernatorial election (with McMillan and Christialle Felix on the ticket). McMillan finished sixth in the mayoral election and was thrown off the ballot in the gubernatorial election due to his petitions being photocopies. He again submitted petitions for the 2018 gubernatorial election with Felix as his running mate, which were challenged; he was removed from the ballot and unsuccessfully sued to get back onto the ballot.

== In the District of Columbia ==
Former District of Columbia shadow representative John Capozzi and a group of incumbents used the name Rent Is Too Darn High for their slate while running for the District of Columbia Democratic State Committee in 2014. McMillan endorsed the group. On the ballot, the slate used the word darn rather than damn because District rules prohibit expletives on the ballot.

McMillan sued the District of Columbia Board of Elections in federal court, saying the ban on expletives violated his right to free speech. In December 2014, Judge Beryl A. Howell of the U.S. District Court for the District of Columbia dismissed the suit, determining that McMillan lacked standing because he was not a candidate or registered voter in the District of Columbia, and determining that the matter was moot in any case because the slate had disbanded and "demonstrated no intent to use the plaintiff's party's name in a future election."

== See also ==
- 2005 New York City mayoral election
