= Kristin M. Davis =

American madam

- Occupations: administrator, Procuress
- Criminal charges: money laundering (2008) promoting prostitution (2008) drug distribution (2013)
- Penalty: 4 months in jail (2009); 18 months in prison (2014)

Kristin M. Davis, previously known as the Manhattan Madam, is a former madam who was known for running a high-end prostitution ring in New York City which claimed to have offered its services to several high-profile clients, including Eliot Spitzer, Alex Rodriguez and David Beckham. After her conviction for prostitution related activities, Davis ran a protest campaign for Governor of New York in 2010 and was poised to run for New York City Comptroller in 2013 before being arrested (and later convicted) for distributing drugs.

In July 2018, Davis was contacted by Special Counsel Robert Mueller in connection with his investigation of Russian interference in the 2016 US presidential election campaign.

== Early career ==
In 1994, Davis began working in an administrative position at Brookhaven Capital Management in Menlo Park, California. She said that she was repeatedly promoted, becoming the organization's comptroller at age 25. She worked at third-party administrators Conifer Securities from February 2002 to March 2003; she said she left that company to go to Hemisphere Management, a hedge fund operation with assets of over $2 billion, where she said that she was vice-president of operations in charge of a staff of 40 in the firm's Boston office.

== Criminal activity ==
=== Involvement in prostitution industry ===
Davis said that after leaving her hedge fund job (she has at different times claimed to have been "unfairly fired" and to have quit voluntarily), she started her business as a madam after her mother suffered serious health problems and could no longer work. Davis was arrested in March 2008 during a string of arrests surrounding then-Governor of New York Eliot Spitzer. (Davis was not, however, involved with the Emperors Club VIP, the prostitution ring at the center of the scandal that led to Spitzer's resignation.)

Another of Davis's alleged clients was baseball player Alex Rodriguez, who was also rumored to have dated Davis herself; Davis has neither confirmed nor denied those allegations but has claimed to do business with Rodriguez. Davis's involvement with Spitzer, according to her, mostly took place during his time as Attorney General in 2005; for his part, Spitzer has denied ever using Davis's firm, and local police authorities have found no connection between Spitzer and Davis's firm.

Davis was originally defended by Mark Heller, who claimed her arrest was motivated by pressure from the Spitzer arrest. She fired Heller for incompetence after Davis spent four months in Riker's Island. Four days after replacing Heller with attorney Dan Hochheiser, Davis was freed on reduced bail.

Along with Wall Street therapist Johnathan Alpert in the documentary film Inside Job (2010), Davis estimates her pre-financial crisis customer base at around 10,000 clients, of which 40–50% of her high-end escort services were purchased by those working on Wall Street. Use of Davis and her prostitution services extended to senior management of all major Wall Street firms, with Morgan Stanley a "little less", and Goldman Sachs being "pretty, pretty big" into using the services. She held black cards from the financial firms and services would be expensed on corporate accounts disguised as computer repair, trading research, consulting for market compliance, and so on. Prostitution services "absolutely" extended to executives at the very top of financial firms. Davis claimed in 2011 that her agency provided prostitutes to Dominique Strauss-Kahn in 2006, but that he was "rough and angry", and according to her, "When men abuse women I'm no longer going to protect their identities."

Davis served four months in Rikers Island for her involvement in the Spitzer scandal. She claimed that she witnessed "psychosexual torture" during her time on Rikers Island. Davis said that she ended her involvement in the prostitution industry as a madam after serving jail time. Her sentencing also included five years of probation, which was cut short in November 2010 after two and a half years.

Davis announced in February 2011 that she would be opening "Hope House," a nonprofit organization designed to assist women affected by sex trafficking. A hotline was to be set up in the year, while a full shelter would be constructed in 2013 if there were sufficient funds. No such facility was ever built.

=== Drug dealing ===
On August 5, 2013, Davis was arrested and charged with four counts of distributing and possessing with intent to distribute a controlled substance (including prescription drugs like Ambien and Xanax) to a Federal Bureau of Investigation (FBI) cooperating witness between January 7 to April 24, 2013. She was released on August 6, 2013, on a $100,000 bail, with preliminary hearing scheduled for September 5.

According to an Act of Information by a cooperating witness, Davis had bought ecstasy and Xanax pills from this FBI cooperating witness 4 times. Based on information provided by this witness (after his own arrest), the FBI set up a sting operation, during which Davis gave her own prescription pills to the witness, whom she believed to be her friend. The meetings were recorded both on video and on audiotape.

Davis chose not to fight her case and plead guilty to one of the four charges in a plea bargain with federal authorities on March 7, 2014. During Davis' sentencing, the presiding Judge stated that he saw "no difference between selling pills and giving them away". Davis was sentenced to 24 months in prison. Davis contends that she gave her pills to a friend and accepted reimbursement for the money she paid for the prescription. Davis served 18 months under federal confinement and was released in May 2016.

== Political activity ==
=== 2010 gubernatorial campaign ===
Davis was a candidate in the 2010 New York gubernatorial election on the Anti-Prohibition line. She ran on a platform of legalizing prostitution, marijuana and same sex marriage, and firearms rights. Among her unorthodox campaign strategies was the naming of her campaign committee as "Friends of Kristin Davis," which abbreviated to FOKD. She stated a goal of raising $2 million for her campaign. She admits she knew that she was a long shot to win the race.

Roger Stone, who had worked as an operative for former presidents Richard Nixon, Ronald Reagan and George H. W. Bush, was named as Davis's campaign manager, and was still listed as so as of April 2010, though he also cooperated with his protégé, Michael Caputo, on a competing campaign by Buffalo developer Carl Paladino. Stone stated that the two candidates had distinct goals – Davis was only seeking to gain the requisite 50,000 votes, while Paladino, in Stone's view, had an actual chance to win – and as such he did not believe there to be a conflict of interest. Stone also said he accepted his position in the Davis campaign before Paladino entered the race. Caputo stated that he believed Davis would at least outdraw Conservative Party nominee Rick Lazio. Radio personality and political activist Frank Morano also helped lead her campaign team and aided with debate prep. Davis considered seeking the nomination along with fellow candidates Sam Sloan and Guilderland attorney Warren Redlich for the Libertarian Party of New York. However, she decided not to appear at the party's convention on April 24, 2010, because the party refused to a give her and candidate Sam Sloan access to the party's mailing list so they could lobby the members prior to the convention while they gave their favored candidate, Warren Redlich, access to the list and other materials to secure the nomination. Because of this Davis chose not to seek the Libertarian nomination or attend the convention and the other candidate, Sam Sloan sued the party. Thus Davis chose to create her own party yet still continue to advocate for Libertarian ideals. Several names for the line, including "Surprise Party," "Citizens Party," "Marijuana Legalization Party," "Hookers and Pot Party," "Personal Freedom Party" and "Reform Party" were rejected by outside sources (Personal Freedom due to a conflict with Charles Barron's "Freedom Party" despite Barron's much later entry into the gubernatorial race, and Reform Party due to a dispute with the national Reform Party), before settling on the name "Anti-Prohibition Party" in July 2010.

Anti-Prohibition Party (APP) petitions had Linda Espejo listed as the lieutenant governor candidate, though at least one report suggests that Espejo declined the nomination, requiring a replacement to be named by a committee. The party named Jewish-Russian-American lawyer and community organizer Tanya Gendelman as Espejo's replacement. Randy Credico, already running in the Democratic Party primary and cross-endorsed by the Libertarians, was the nominee for the Senate seat held by Chuck Schumer. Vivia Mowagan was the candidate for Kirsten Gillibrand's Senate seat. Davis endorsed Democrat Kathleen Rice for attorney general, though Rice did not appear on the APP line. Jeffrey Graham, the mayor of Watertown, endorsed Davis, and despite declining an invitation to be the APP lieutenant governor nominee, he continued to campaign for Davis at his business and on his Web site.

Davis was in the official NY Gubernatorial Debate at Hofstra University on October 18, 2010, along with all six other candidates on the ballot. Davis finished with 20,898 votes in the official vote tally, less than half the necessary votes to qualify as a political party and in last place overall. Her low vote count was attributed in large part to being placed on a different ballot line than the other gubernatorial candidates, thus making it harder for voters to find them. Davis's strongest showings were in Jefferson and Lewis Counties (areas in the Watertown market, suggesting that Graham's endorsement played a major role), where she finished third, behind only Andrew Cuomo and Carl Paladino.

=== 2013 comptroller campaign ===
Davis filed with the New York City Campaign Finance Board to run for New York City Comptroller in 2013. However, according to various media outlets she planned on running for Mayor of New York City in 2013. On Saturday January 12, 2013, Davis received the early endorsement for mayor from the Queens Libertarian Party, the largest Libertarian chapter in New York City. She later declared that she was running for New York City Comptroller.

Davis withdrew from the race before the election and did not submit petitions to appear on the ballot, in part because of her drug arrest in August 2013.

=== 2017–2019 special counsel investigation ===
In July 2018, The New York Times reported that Davis was expecting a subpoena from special counsel, Robert Mueller, who was investigating Russian interference in the 2016 election. It was then reported by NBC News that Davis had a private meeting on August 3 with the Special Counsel's team because of her links and longterm employment by Trump advisor Roger J. Stone Jr.

In defense of Davis' subpoena, Stone issued the following statement: "Kristin Davis has been a friend of mine and has worked on and off for me for 10 years," Stone said, noting that Davis is currently in the cosmetology business. "She is a brilliant woman who paid her debt to society and who has remade her life. I am the Godfather to her son."

On August 10, 2018, Davis formally testified for the Special Counsel in DC. The next week, Davis appeared on Good Day New York and talked about the perceived bullying she received by prosecutor Aaron Zellinsky and how she identified comedian Randy Credico as the "intermediary" between Stone and WikiLeaks founder Julian Assange.

Davis has been a vocal advocate for Stone's defense, appearing on numerous TV shows after his arrest in 2019.

=== 2022 January 6 Committee Investigation ===
While Davis has not publicly talked about her subpoena and January 6 committee interview, the transcript of her testimony is publicly available.
