= 2006 New York gubernatorial election =

- November 7, 2006
- Turnout: 34.9%
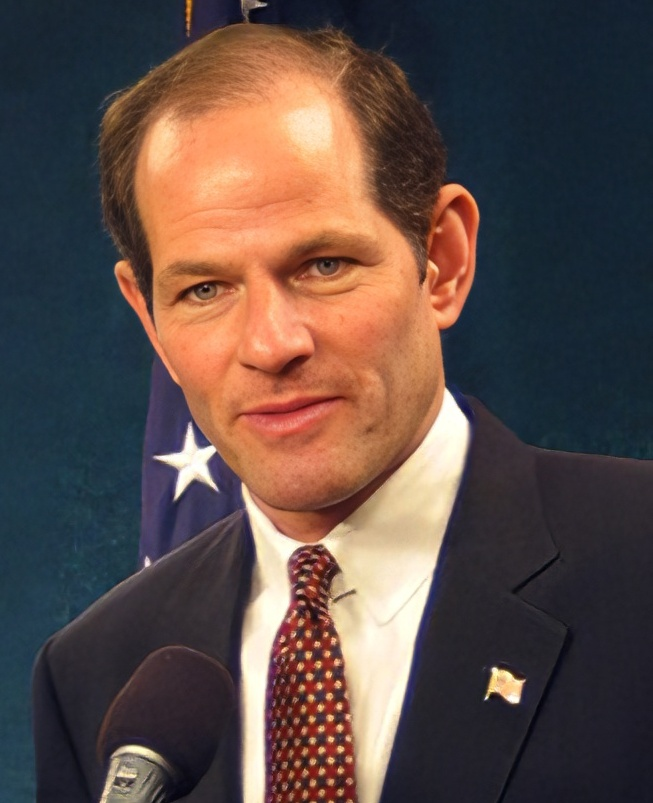

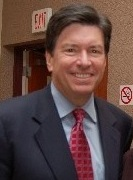
Nominee	Eliot Spitzer	John Faso
Party	Democratic	Republican
Alliance	Parties: Independence; Working Families	Conservative
Running mate	David Paterson	C. Scott Vanderhoef
Popular vote	3,086,709	1,274,335
Percentage	69.56%	28.72%
- County results Spitzer: 40–50% 50–60% 60–70% 70–80% 80–90% Faso: 40–50% 50–60%
Governor before election
George Pataki
Republican
Elected Governor
Eliot Spitzer
Democratic

The 2006 New York gubernatorial election took place on November 7, 2006, to elect the governor and lieutenant governor of New York. Then-incumbent Republican governor George Pataki chose not to run for re-election in a fourth term. Democrat Eliot Spitzer, the New York Attorney General, won the election over former Republican state Assembly minority leader John Faso. Primary elections were held on September 12.

This was the first open-seat election since 1982. This is the last gubernatorial election where any of the following counties voted Democratic: Genesee, Chautauqua, Cattaraugus, Niagara, Fulton, Steuben, Tioga, and Schoharie.

Spitzer was slated to serve between January 1, 2007, and December 31, 2010, but he announced his resignation on March 12, 2008 (effective March 17, 2008), amid news of his involvement in a prostitution scandal. Spitzer was succeeded on March 17 by Lieutenant Governor David Paterson.

== Republican primary ==
=== Candidates ===
- John Faso, former New York Assembly minority leader (1998–2002) and Republican nominee for Comptroller in 2002
  - Running mate: C. Scott Vanderhoef, Rockland County Executive

==== Withdrew ====
- Randy Daniels, Secretary of the State of New York
- Patrick R. Manning, Assemblyman from Dutchess County
- Bill Weld, former Governor of Massachusetts (following loss at convention)

==== Declined ====
- Tom Golisano, businessman and Independence Party nominee for Governor in 1994, 1998, and 2002
- George Pataki, incumbent Governor since 1995 (declined on July 27, 2005)
- Donald Trump, president of the Trump Organization and host of The Apprentice (Democratic Party; endorsed Eliot Spitzer)

=== Campaign ===
Following the early campaign announcement of Attorney General Eliot Spitzer in late 2004, attention turned to the state Republican Party, especially the future of three-term governor George Pataki. Polling throughout 2004 and into 2005 consistently showed Spitzer defeating Pataki in theoretical matchups. Pataki announced on July 27, 2005, that he would not seek re-election and would step down at the end of his term in January 2007.

In 2005, John Faso announced his intention to run for governor. He positioned himself early as a conservative upstate candidate, while stressing his childhood roots in Long Island. He initially faced former Massachusetts Governor Bill Weld, former Secretary of State Randy Daniels, and Assemblyman Patrick Manning. Weld, a moderate, was supported by party leadership.

On February 14, Faso launched a statewide campaign ad announcing his candidacy for governor. Later that month, he was endorsed by Conservative Party Chairman Michael Long and by Congressman John Sweeney. Daniels and Manning both dropped out and Faso became the primary challenger to Weld. It was reported that in early 2006, Weld offered Faso the chance to join his ticket as a candidate for lieutenant governor, an offer Faso reportedly declined. Faso gained increasing support from party leaders in various counties, including Westchester and Suffolk, both of which had large delegate counts to the state convention.

In late May 2006, Faso received the nomination of the Conservative Party for governor, which guaranteed him a spot on the November ballot. He pledged to continue running for governor on the Conservative line if he lost the Republican primary to Weld. On the day he received the Conservative nomination, Faso announced his selection of Rockland County Executive C. Scott Vanderhoef as his running mate for lieutenant governor.

On June 1, 2006, the Republican State Convention voted 61% to 39% to endorse Faso. By receiving over 50 percent of the vote, Faso was the designated Republican Party candidate, but Weld still received enough support to force a primary. As The Washington Post put it, "[n]ow it turns out whoever loses the GOP primary will stay in the race—in a position likely to siphon votes from the Republican nominee." For this reason, Weld was under tremendous pressure to drop out of the race. On June 5, Stephen J. Minarik, the chairman of the state Republican Party, who had been Weld's most prominent backer, called on Weld to withdraw in the interest of party unity. Weld formally announced his withdrawal from the race, and his support of Faso, the following day.

== Democratic primary ==
=== Candidates ===
- Eliot Spitzer, Attorney General of New York (1999–2006)
  - Running mate: David Paterson, New York Senate minority leader
- Tom Suozzi, Nassau County Executive

=== Campaign ===
On December 7, 2004, Eliot Spitzer announced his intention to seek the Democratic nomination for the 2006 election for Governor of New York. Spitzer's campaign manager was Ryan Toohey of Global Strategy Group, which Spitzer had hired for his 1998 campaign for attorney general and for the gubernatorial campaign. While long rumored, Spitzer's announcement was nevertheless considered unusually early—nearly two years before the election. Some pundits believed the timing was due to Spitzer's desire to see if Senator Charles Schumer, a more senior Democrat, would run. Schumer, who was largely favored in opinion polls in a hypothetical matchup against Spitzer, announced in November that he would not run for governor, instead accepting an offer to sit on the powerful Finance Committee and head the Democratic Senatorial Campaign Committee. After Schumer announced he would maintain his Senate seat, another Democrat, Andrew Cuomo, announced his plans to run for Spitzer's vacated Attorney General's seat.

Spitzer won an early vote of confidence on January 22, 2005, by gaining the endorsement of the Working Families Party, which has taken advantage of New York's electoral fusion system to act as a kingmaker over Democratic nominees. It is backed heavily by figures from community group ACORN and labor unions, particularly those that broke from the AFL–CIO to form the Change to Win Federation. In the months after the WFP endorsement, several Change to Win unions have announced that they are endorsing Spitzer under their own name, including UNITE HERE, the Teamsters, and the United Food and Commercial Workers. By July 2005, Spitzer had forced Governor Pataki from the race.

In the latter half of 2005, Spitzer sought to further solidify support for his campaign by touring the state, seeking and giving political endorsements. These included cross endorsements with former-Bronx Borough President Fernando Ferrer in the New York City Mayoral election, Matthew Driscoll in the Syracuse Mayoral election, and State Senator Byron Brown in the Buffalo Mayoral election. The benefit to Spitzer in these endorsement deals was valuable media attention as he stumped for the candidates. As a result of Spitzer's relative speed in uniting state Democrats to his side, he had gained the respect of Democratic leaders nationwide. Bill Richardson dubbed Spitzer the "future of the Democratic Party", at a fundraiser held in June 2005 for Spitzer's gubernatorial campaign.

With a large polling lead in the Democratic primary, the June 2006 Quinnipiac University Polling Institute poll showed him leading Nassau county executive Tom Suozzi 76–13 percent, compared to a 73–13 percent lead in a May 17, 2006, poll.

An additional consideration for Spitzer was the status of billionaire businessman Tom Golisano, a three-time candidate on the Independence Party ballot line. It was rumored that Golisano might run again, and that Republican Party insiders would seek to nominate him on their own party's line, thus fusing the Republican and Independence tickets for the first time in a gubernatorial election. Golisano recently switched his party affiliation to the GOP. However, on February 1, 2006, Golisano announced that he would not run for governor.

Spitzer selected African-American New York State Senate minority leader David Paterson as his choice for Lieutenant Governor and running mate in January 2006. In New York gubernatorial elections, the most important factor in the gubernatorial candidate's choice of a lieutenant governor is the need to "balance the ticket"—that is, to widen the candidate's appeal, whether by reaching out to someone from a different geographic area, ethnic background, or has a different political base. Paterson's father Basil Paterson was also a candidate for Lt. Governor in 1970.

In February 2006, Spitzer received the endorsement of then-Democrat businessman Donald Trump, who had been courted by the Republicans to run against him.

=== Results ===
Results by county: Spitzer: 50–60%; 60–70%; 70–80%; 80–90%; 90–100%

In the Democratic primary, held on September 12, 2006, Spitzer handily defeated Suozzi, securing his party's nomination with 82% of the vote.

Democratic gubernatorial primary results
Party	Candidate	Votes	%
Democratic	Eliot Spitzer	624,684	81.88%
Democratic	Tom Suozzi	138,263	18.12%
Total votes		762,947	100.00

== General election ==
=== Candidates ===
- John Clifton (Libertarian)
  - Running mate: Donald Silberger
- Maura DeLuca, activist (Socialist Workers)
  - Running mate: Ben O'Shaughnessy
- John Faso, former Minority Leader of the New York Assembly (Republican and Conservative)
  - Running mate: C. Scott Vanderhoef, Rockland County Executive
- Phoebe Legere, singer and host of Roulette TV (Integrity)
  - Running mate: Nancy Beattie
- Jennifer Liese (Right to Life)
  - Running mate: Wendy Holibaugh
- Malachy McCourt, author, actor, talk radio host, and brother of Frank McCourt (Green)
  - Running mate: Alison Duncan
- Jimmy McMillan, Vietnam War veteran, former letter carrier, and candidate for mayor of New York City in 2005 (Rent is Too High)
  - Running mate: None
- Eliot Spitzer, Attorney General of New York (Democratic, Independence and Working Families)
  - Running mate: David Paterson, Minority Leader of the New York Senate

McMillan sought to run for governor as the candidate of the "My Rent Is Too Damn High Party". The State Board of Elections allowed him on the ballot, but only under the rubric of the "Rent Is Too High Party". That version appeared on Row H.

=== Predictions ===
Source	Ranking	As of
The Cook Political Report	Solid D (flip)	November 6, 2006
Sabato's Crystal Ball	Safe D (flip)	November 6, 2006
Rothenberg Political Report	Likely D (flip)	November 2, 2006
Real Clear Politics	Safe D (flip)	November 6, 2006

=== Polling ===
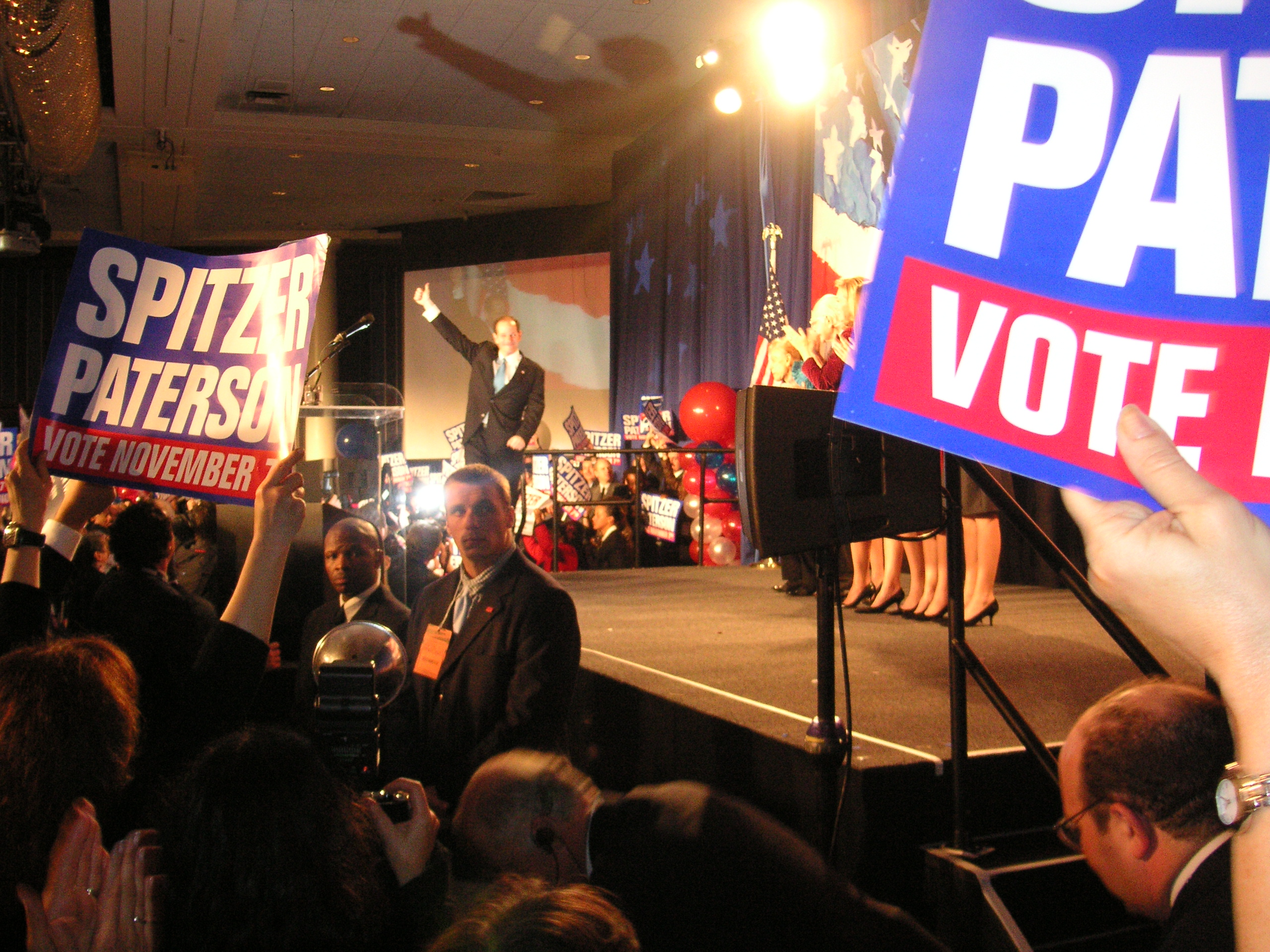
Spitzer celebrating his victory

Poll source	Date	Eliot Spitzer (D)	John Faso (R)
Marist College	November 1, 2006	69%	24%
Siena Research Institute	November 1, 2006	69%	24%
Zogby International Poll	September 11, 2006	60.9%	25.8%
Green Papers Poll	September 9, 2006	72.5%	26.9
Green Papers Poll	September 1, 2006	68.1%	23.6
Zogby International Poll	August 28, 2006	60.7%	25.9%
Marist College	August 23, 2006	67%	23%
Quinnipiac	August 23, 2006	65%	17%
Siena Research Institute	August 7, 2006	70%	17%
Rasmussen	August 5, 2006	62%	21%
Zogby International Poll	July 24, 2006	60.8%	24.8%
Marist College Poll	July 19, 2006	69%	20%
Zogby International Poll	June 21, 2006	60.6%	24.8%
Quinnipiac	June 21, 2006	66%	20%
Siena College Poll	June 19, 2006	67%	21%
Quinnipiac	May 17, 2006	67%	16%
Marist College Poll	May 10, 2006	70%	20%
Siena College Poll	May 4, 2006	64%	17%
Strategic Vision	April 28, 2006	63%	26%
Quinnipiac	March 29, 2006	66%	18%
Strategic Vision	March 2, 2006	65%	24%
Marist College Poll	February 1, 2006	68%	18%
Zogby International Poll	January 26, 2006	54%	17%
Quinnipiac University Poll	January 19, 2006	61%	19%
Quinnipiac University Poll	December 14, 2005	64%	14%
Siena College Poll	October 12, 2005	63%	19%
Quinnipiac University Poll	October 4, 2005	60%	14%
Marist College Poll	September 30, 2005	64%	20%

=== Results ===

2006 gubernatorial election in New York
Party	Candidate	Running mate	Votes	Percentage	Swing
Democratic	Eliot Spitzer		2,740,864	61.77%	▲30.27%
Independence	Eliot Spitzer		190,661	4.30%	▼9.98%
Working Families	Eliot Spitzer		155,184	3.50%	▲1.52%
Total	Eliot Spitzer	David Paterson	3,086,709	69.56%	▲36.06%
Republican	John Faso		1,105,681	24.92%	▼20.62%
Conservative	John Faso		168,654	3.80%	▼0.06%
Total	John Faso	C. Scott Vanderhoef	1,274,335	28.72%	▼20.68%
Green	Malachy McCourt	Brian Jones	42,166	0.95%	▲0.04%
Libertarian	John Clifton	Donald Silberger	14,736	0.33%	▲0.22%
Rent Is Too Damn High	Jimmy McMillan	None	13,355	0.30%	N/A
Socialist Workers	Maura DeLuca	Ben O'Shaughnessy	5,919	0.13%	N/A
Majority			1,812,374	40.84%	
Totals			4,437,220	100.00%	
Democratic gain from Republican			Swing		

==== New York City results ====
2006 gubernatorial election in New York City		Manhattan	The Bronx	Brooklyn	Queens	Staten Island	Total	
Democratic	Eliot Spitzer	313,396	146,941	287,262	251,070	51,257	1,049,926	84.4%
Democratic	Eliot Spitzer	87.8%	88.8%	85.8%	82.1%	62.7%	1,049,926	84.4%
Republican	John Faso	34,438	16,118	40,199	50,284	29,348	170,387	13.7%
Republican	John Faso	9.6%	9.7%	12.0%	16.4%	35.9%	170,387	13.7%

==== Results by county ====
County	Eliot Spitzer Democratic		John Faso Republican		Various candidates		Margin		Total votes cast
County	#	%	#	%	#	%	#	%	Total votes cast
Albany	80,210	73.6%	26,848	24.7%	1,854	1.7%	53,362	48.9%	108,912
Allegany	6,568	49.0%	6,575	49.0%	266	2.0%	−7	−0.0%	13,409
Bronx	146,941	88.8%	16,118	9.7%	2,459	1.6%	130,823	79.1%	165,518
Broome	40,683	64.9%	20,944	33.4%	1,059	1.8%	19,739	31.5%	62,686
Cattaraugus	10,981	49.5%	10,803	48.7%	418	1.9%	178	0.8%	22,202
Cayuga	17,449	65.2%	8,900	33.2%	429	1.5%	8,549	32.0%	26,778
Chautauqua	19,690	53.4%	16,610	45.0%	578	1.6%	3,080	8.4%	36,878
Chemung	16,341	62.3%	9,501	36.2%	370	1.4%	6,840	26.1%	26,212
Chenango	8,521	57.1%	6,028	40.4%	365	2.5%	2,493	16.7%	14,914
Clinton	14,922	65.0%	7,659	33.3%	388	1.8%	7,263	31.7%	22,969
Columbia	14,182	58.6%	9,647	39.8%	382	1.6%	4,535	18.8%	24,211
Cortland	9,180	62.2%	5,287	35.8%	283	1.9%	3,893	26.4%	14,750
Delaware	8,041	55.4%	6,173	42.5%	307	2.2%	1,868	12.9%	14,521
Dutchess	50,682	62.2%	29,095	35.7%	1,670	2.0%	21,587	26.5%	81,447
Erie	177,926	63.9%	95,819	34.4%	4,812	1.8%	82,107	29.5%	278,557
Essex	7,366	57.8%	5,161	40.5%	210	1.7%	2,205	17.3%	12,737
Franklin	7,635	63.6%	4,188	34.9%	179	1.5%	3,447	28.7%	12,002
Fulton	8,753	59.2%	5,840	39.5%	203	1.4%	2,913	19.3%	14,796
Genesee	9,038	49.4%	8,979	49.1%	286	1.6%	59	0.3%	18,303
Greene	8,458	49.8%	8,206	48.4%	303	1.8%	252	1.4%	16,967
Hamilton	1,217	45.6%	1,403	52.5%	51	1.9%	−186	−6.9%	2,671
Herkimer	11,410	59.0%	7,611	39.4%	307	1.6%	3,799	19.6%	19,328
Jefferson	15,648	63.3%	8,721	35.3%	355	1.4%	6,927	28.0%	24,724
Kings	287,262	85.8%	40,199	12.0%	8,157	2.1%	247,063	73.8%	334,618
Lewis	4,059	55.6%	3,139	43.0%	100	1.3%	920	12.6%	7,298
Livingston	11,068	55.6%	8,448	42.4%	388	2.0%	2,620	13.2%	19,904
Madison	13,470	62.6%	7,696	35.8%	359	1.7%	5,774	26.8%	21,525
Monroe	159,683	65.6%	75,014	32.9%	3,391	1.5%	74,669	32.7%	228,088
Montgomery	8,699	62.5%	4,995	35.9%	218	1.6%	3,704	26.6%	13,912
Nassau	234,452	64.9%	122,567	33.9%	4,349	1.2%	111,885	31.0%	361,368
New York	313,396	87.8%	34,438	9.6%	9,148	2.6%	278,958	78.2%	356,982
Niagara	37,477	59.2%	25,060	39.6%	817	1.3%	12,417	19.6%	63,354
Oneida	44,743	63.0%	25,332	35.7%	962	1.4%	19,411	27.3%	71,037
Onondaga	104,649	68.6%	45,280	29.7%	2,665	1.7%	59,369	38.9%	152,594
Ontario	20,199	59.6%	13,207	39.0%	477	1.4%	6,992	20.6%	33,883
Orange	56,770	64.4%	29,994	34.0%	1,387	1.6%	26,776	30.4%	88,151
Orleans	5,241	48.6%	5,331	49.5%	202	1.9%	−90	−0.9%	10,774
Oswego	19,975	62.5%	11,342	35.5%	640	2.0%	8,633	27.0%	31,957
Otsego	11,467	61.7%	6,681	36.0%	425	2.3%	4,786	25.7%	18,573
Putnam	17,542	58.5%	11,871	39.6%	594	2.0%	5,671	18.9%	30,007
Queens	251,070	82.1%	50,284	16.4%	4,460	1.4%	200,786	65.7%	305,814
Rensselaer	35,970	66.5%	17,207	31.8%	881	1.6%	18,763	34.7%	54,058
Richmond	51,257	62.7%	29,348	35.9%	1,107	1.4%	21,909	26.8%	81,712
Rockland	49,524	62.3%	28,857	36.3%	1,159	1.5%	20,667	26.0%	79,540
St. Lawrence	18,887	67.3%	8,744	30.8%	453	1.7%	10,143	36.5%	28,084
Saratoga	50,236	62.3%	29,266	36.3%	1,155	1.5%	20,970	26.0%	80,657
Schenectady	33,949	67.1%	15,839	31.3%	791	1.6%	18,110	35.8%	50,579
Schoharie	5,529	50.7%	5,181	47.5%	187	1.8%	348	3.2%	10,897
Schuyler	3,317	55.8%	2,514	42.3%	115	1.9%	803	13.5%	5,946
Seneca	6,511	63.1%	3,623	35.1%	178	1.8%	2,888	28.0%	10,312
Steuben	14,794	52.7%	12,858	45.8%	427	1.5%	1,936	6.9%	28,079
Suffolk	223,453	63.3%	124,571	35.3%	5,247	1.5%	98,882	28.0%	353,271
Sullivan	13,205	67.1%	6,060	30.8%	410	2.1%	7,145	36.3%	19,675
Tioga	8,743	55.2%	6,841	43.2%	242	1.5%	1,902	12.0%	15,826
Tompkins	21,213	72.8%	7,117	24.4%	794	2.7%	14,096	48.4%	29,124
Ulster	40,841	68.0%	17,315	28.8%	1,867	3.0%	23,526	39.2%	60,023
Warren	13,923	61.0%	8,457	37.1%	426	1.9%	5,466	23.9%	22,806
Washington	10,822	59.5%	7,024	38.6%	340	1.9%	3,798	20.9%	18,186
Wayne	13,992	53.8%	11,651	44.8%	388	1.4%	2,341	9.0%	26,031
Westchester	177,246	69.0%	75,083	29.2%	4,434	1.7%	102,163	39.8%	256,763
Wyoming	5,950	46.5%	6,659	52.0%	189	1.5%	−709	−5.5%	12,798
Yates	4,283	56.9%	3,126	41.6%	113	1.5%	1,157	15.3%	7,522
Totals	3,086,709	69.6%	1,274,335	28.7%	76,176	1.7%	1,812,374	40.9%	4,437,220

Counties that flipped from Republican to Democratic

- Albany (largest municipality: Albany)
- Broome (largest municipality: Binghamton)
- Cattaraugus (largest municipality: Olean)
- Cayuga (largest municipality: Auburn)
- Chautauqua (largest municipality: Jamestown)
- Chemung (largest municipality: Elmira)
- Chenango (largest municipality: Norwich)
- Clinton (largest municipality: Plattsburgh)
- Columbia (largest municipality: Hudson)
- Cortland (largest municipality: Cortland)
- Delaware (largest municipality: Sidney)
- Dutchess (County Seat: Poughkeepsie)
- Erie (largest municipality: Buffalo)
- Essex (largest municipality: Ticonderoga)
- Franklin (largest municipality: Malone)
- Fulton (largest municipality: Gloversville)
- Genesee (largest municipality: Batavia)
- Greene (largest municipality: Catskill)
- Herkimer (largest municipality: German Flatts)
- Jefferson (largest municipality: Le Ray)
- Lewis (largest municipality: Lowville)
- Livingston (largest municipality: Geneseo)
- Madison (largest municipality: Oneida)
- Montgomery (largest municipality: Amsterdam)
- Nassau (largest municipality: Hempstead)
- Niagara (County Seat: Lockport)
- Oneida (largest municipality: Utica)
- Onondaga (largest municipality: Syracuse)
- Ontario (largest municipality: Geneva)
- Orange (largest municipality: Kiryas Joel)
- Oswego (largest municipality: Oswego)
- Otsego (largest municipality: Oneonta)
- Putnam (largest municipality: Lake Carmel)
- Rockland (County Seat: New City)
- Rensselaer (County Seat: Troy)
- Richmond (Staten Island, borough of New York City)
- Steuben (largest municipality: Corning)
- St. Lawrence (largest municipality: Massena)
- Saratoga (largest municipality: Saratoga Springs)
- Schenectady (largest municipality: Schenectady)
- Schoharie (largest municipality: Cobleskill)
- Schuyler (largest municipality: Watkins Glen)
- Seneca (largest municipality: Seneca Falls)
- Suffolk (largest municipality: Brookhaven)
- Sullivan (largest municipality: Monticello)
- Tioga (largest municipality: Waverly)
- Tompkins (largest municipality: Ithaca)
- Ulster (largest municipality: Kingston)
- Warren (largest municipality: Glens Falls)
- Washington (largest municipality: Hudson Falls)
- Wayne (largest municipality: Newark)
- Westchester (largest municipality: White Plains)
- Yates (largest municipality: Penn Yan)

Counties that flipped from Independence to Democratic

- Monroe (largest municipality: Rochester)

== See also ==
- Governorship of George Pataki
- 2006 United States Senate election in New York
- 2006 New York attorney general election
- 2006 New York Comptroller election
- 2006 United States gubernatorial elections
- 1970 New York gubernatorial election
