= Sam Sloan =

American perennial candidate (born 1944)

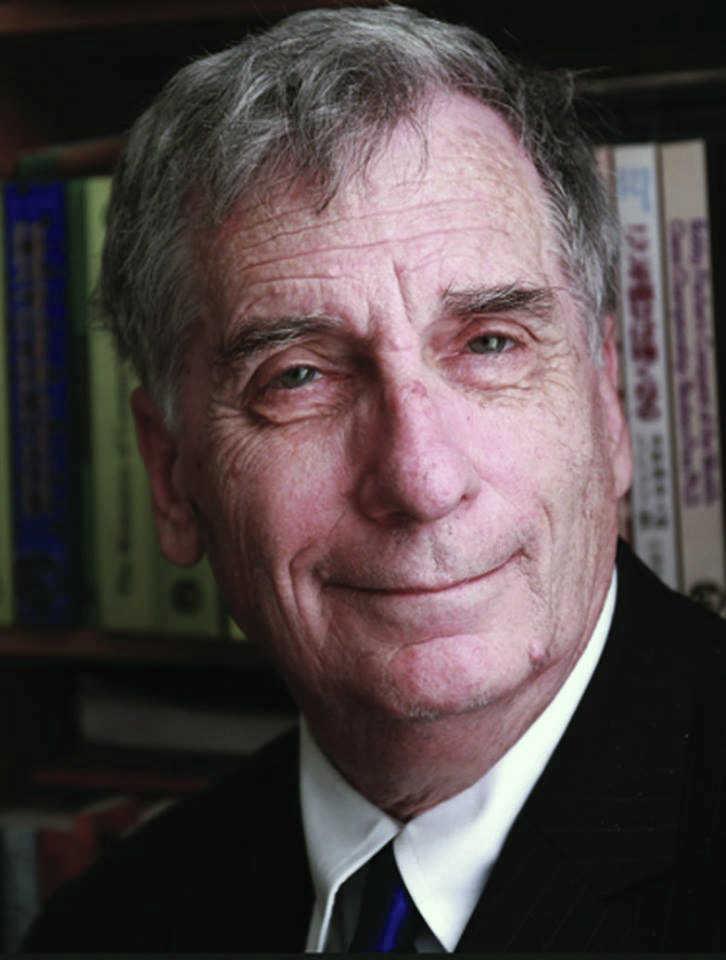
- Sloan in 2014
- Born: Samuel Howard Sloan; September 7, 1944 (age 82); Richmond, Virginia, U.S.
- Other name: Mohammad Ismail Sloan
- Education: University of California, Berkeley (dropped out)
- Occupation: Broker-dealer
- Known for: Winning a case pro se before the U.S. Supreme Court
- Political party: Republican (since 2023); Democratic (2014–2023); Libertarian (2002–2014)
- Children: 3

Samuel Howard Sloan (born September 7, 1944), also known as Mohammad Ismail Sloan, is an American perennial candidate and former broker-dealer. In 1978, he won a case pro se before the United States Supreme Court, becoming the last non-lawyer to argue a case in front of the court before it prohibited the practice in 2013. He has unsuccessfully run or attempted to run for several political offices, including president of the United States.

== Early life and education ==
Sloan was born in Richmond, Virginia, and graduated from high school in 1962. He studied at the University of California, Berkeley, where he became president of the Sexual Freedom League branch before dropping out.

Sloan began studying chess at age 7. In 1959, he was the youngest competitor in the National Capital Open Chess Tournament in Washington, D.C. The United States Chess Federation's database reports that he has played in 152 chess tournaments since 1991 and that his highest USCF rating was 2107 in 1997.

== Career ==
Starting in 1968, Sloan worked for two years in the over-the-counter trading department at the Wall Street investment banking firm Hayden, Stone & Co. In 1970, he established Samuel H. Sloan & Company, a registered broker-dealer primarily trading over-the-counter stocks and bonds. The Securities and Exchange Commission (SEC) brought civil actions against Sloan & Co. starting in 1971, alleging he had failed to maintain adequate books and records, and revoked his broker-dealer registration in 1975. After years of litigation, he prevailed in a case against the SEC at the U.S. Supreme Court in 1978, arguing his case pro se. He submitted a 175-page brief that The New Republic called a "singularly absurd and complicated document" with "far too many obfuscations and legal shenanigans". The Supreme Court ruled unanimously that the "tacking" of 10-day summary suspension orders for an indefinite period was an abuse of the SEC's authority and a deprivation of due process. Sloan is the last non-lawyer to argue before the court, which prohibited that practice in 2013.

In the 1980s, Sloan assumed control of Ishi Press, a digital and print-on-demand publishing company.

Sloan spent four years in the United Arab Emirates writing a chess column and running a computer store. In July 2006, he was elected to a one-year term on the executive board of the United States Chess Federation (USCF) after finishing in second place (the first-place finisher received a three-year term). In 2007, he ran for reelection to the board but was unsuccessful, finishing ninth out of 10 candidates. He subsequently sued two officers of the board.

== Political campaigns ==
Sloan ran for the Libertarian nomination for governor of New York in 2010 against attorney Warren Redlich and former madam Kristin M. Davis. By his own admission, he was not popular in the party and did not expect to win. He lost the nomination to Redlich in a two-way battle, 27 votes to 17, after Davis refused to show up at the convention.

In January 2012, Sloan announced his candidacy for the Libertarian Party's 2012 presidential nomination. Gary Johnson won the nomination.

In November 2013, Sloan was on the ballot for the New York City mayoral election, as an independent on the War Veterans line; he received 166 votes (0.02%).

In June 2014, Sloan ran for the Democratic nomination for New York's 15th congressional district against incumbent José E. Serrano. Serrano won, 91% to 9%. Later that summer, he attempted to submit petitions for the 2014 gubernatorial election, one for the Democratic primary (with Nenad Bach as his running mate) and another an "ambush" of the Libertarian Party line similar to the one he attempted in 2010 (with Tom Stevens as the running mate). Both petitions were ruled invalid.

In 2016, Sloan paid $1,000 to enter the Democratic presidential primary in New Hampshire but was not nominated. He was also a candidate in the 2016 Democratic primary for Congress in New York's 13th congressional district. He received 197 votes (0.46%), placing eighth out of nine candidates. Adriano Espaillat won.

Sloan unsuccessfully ran for president again in 2020 as a Democrat. He later ran in the Democratic primary for New York's 14th US congressional district, one of several challengers to incumbent first-term Representative Alexandria Ocasio-Cortez, but lost with 2.2% of the vote.

Sloan appeared on the New Hampshire primary ballot for the Republican nomination for the 2024 United States presidential election, receiving just 7 individual votes.

== Personal life ==
Sloan has married five women. In 1976, he converted to Islam and changed his name to Mohammad Ismail Sloan, though he continued to also use the name Sam Sloan. In 1986, he was accused of kidnapping his daughter by the couple who had adopted her. He was convicted of attempted kidnapping in 1992 and served 18 months in a Virginia prison.
