= Warren Redlich =

American politician (born 1966)

Member, Guilderland town board
- Incumbent
- Assumed office 2007

Personal details
- Born: March 8, 1966 (age 60) Syosset, New York, U.S.
- Party: Libertarian (2010-present); Republican Party (before 2010)
- Spouse: Heather J. Blum (m. 1995; div. 2022)
- Children: 2

Warren Redlich (born March 8, 1966) is an American retired lawyer, former politician, and entrepreneur. He was the Libertarian Party candidate in the New York gubernatorial election, 2010.

== Early life and education ==
Warren Redlich was born in Syosset, New York, United States, on March 8, 1966, to Allen Redlich and Rita Eisenburg. He graduated from Guilderland High School in 1984. He earned a Bachelor of Arts degree in economics and mathematical economic analysis from Rice University, a Master of Arts degree in political science from Stanford University, and a Juris Doctor from Albany Law School. He worked in the insurance industry before entering the legal profession, where he operated his own practice.

== Career ==
During his gubernatorial campaign, Redlich coordinated some of his events with Green Party candidate Howie Hawkins. He served on the Guilderland town board, starting in 2007 as a Republican.

Redlich ran as the Republicans' nominee against Congressman Michael McNulty for the seat representing New York's 21st congressional district in 2004 and 2006. He lost the 2004 race by a 70–30% vote, receiving 74,973 votes. During his first congressional run, Redlich argued that the Republican Party risked losing young voters on social issues, particularly those who supported gay marriage and were pro-choice on abortion, and suggested the party needed to adopt more centrist positions to appeal to this demographic. In 2006, he lost by a 78–22% margin, earning 45,045 votes. During this run he publicly endorsed Democratic candidate Kirsten Gillibrand over incumbent John E. Sweeney for New York's 20th congressional district.

In February 2010, Redlich emerged as a contender for the Republican nomination for Governor of New York, running out of Albany County. He aligned with the party’s anti-establishment Tea Party faction, which had led protests against President Barack Obama's healthcare reforms the previous year. Redlich, who at that time was an attorney, internet entrepreneur, and Republican councilman in Guilderland, criticized Albany's political class during his public statement. He stated that he intended to run on the Libertarian Party line while also seeking the Republican nomination. While campaigning, he proposed adding a salary cap to government employees at $100,000, and a cap pension of $75,000, citing that more than 90,000 government employees earned salaries above that level.

Redlich also attended the New York Republican Convention but received no votes there, and subsequently failed to muster any support for a petition drive. In the general election, Redlich finished in fourth place with 48,359 votes (1%). Redlich defeated Sam Sloan for the Libertarian nomination, 27–17, at the party convention.

In 2010, Warren purchased the website domains associated with the political campaigns of several of his opponents, stating that he sought to preserve their historical value while also incorporating a humorous and critical element. He acquired the domains from Christine O'Donnell's 2008 and 2010 campaigns. The website featured satirical statements about O'Donnell, and its gallery section included unflattering photographs of her.

In October 2010, Redlich claimed Roger Stone, the campaign manager for Kristin M. Davis, encouraged an outside group to circulate flyers labeling Redlich a "sexual predator" and a "sick twisted pervert," citing a Redlich blog post regarding controversy at the time surrounding Miley Cyrus, as a source, and encouraging people to "call the police" if they encountered him. Redlich later sued Stone for defamation over the flyer's allegations and sought damages of $20,000,000. However, the jury returned a verdict in favor of Stone in December 2017. While the jury found the flyers defamatory, they found that Redlich failed to prove Stone was involved in producing or distributing them.

=== Political positions ===
Redlich's most prominent political position is expressed in his motto, "stop wasting money." He proposed placing a salary cap on all state workers limiting them to a salary of $100,000 or less, with those making over $100,000 having their salary cut at the first opportunity, while still protecting existing union contracts. He supports same-sex marriage, prosecution of corrupt public officials, ending corporate welfare. He opposes a constitutional convention, calling it a distraction. He proposes limiting local governments to five sources of revenue. He supports the construction of the proposed Muslim community center two blocks from the World Trade Center site. He supports reforming driving under the influence laws and supports ending the war on drugs.

Redlich believes that roadside checkpoints constitute an unconstitutional search and seizure; in 2015 (by which time he had relocated to Florida), he began promoting a strategy that he designed to protect drivers from driving under the influence accusations. The strategy involves placing the driver's identification, registration and insurance in a plastic bag outside the window, which remains rolled up, along with a note declaring the driver will exercise the right to remain silent. Florida police representatives indicated they would not cooperate with drivers who attempted to use Redlich's strategy, noting they would indefinitely detain any person caught in a checkpoint who refused to speak and stated they had the right to do so based on a 1990 Supreme Court case.

Party political offices
Preceded by John Clifton	Libertarian nominee for Governor of New York; 2010	Succeeded by Michael McDermott
