= Taxpayers Party of New York =

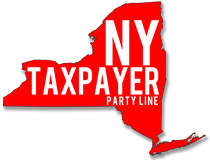
- Leader: Carl Paladino
- Founded: August 10, 2010
- Dissolved: 2011
- Headquarters: Buffalo, New York
- Ideology: American conservatism Fiscal conservatism Social conservatism Right-wing populism Libertarianism; Paleoconservatism

Website
- nytaxpayer.org:80

The Taxpayers Party of New York State was an American political party active in the state of New York. It was not part of any nationwide party, nor is it affiliated with the U.S. Taxpayers' Party (now known as the Constitution Party), which predates it by 18 years, or the Tax Revolt Party active in Nassau County. The Taxpayers Party of New York was founded by Carl Paladino in 2010, with the help of Rus Thompson, Leonard Roberto, Michael Caputo and Gary Berntsen. It officially gained ballot access on August 10, 2010 and fielded candidates in the New York state elections, 2010.

Other than a committee to fill vacancies, the party does not have operations and served only as an additional ballot line for Republican candidates; it was originally designed to counter the decisions of the Conservative Party of New York State under New York's electoral fusion laws. It originally endorsed candidates the Conservative Party passed up in statewide races; after the September primaries, the losers dropped out the races, and each party has cross-nominated the primary winners as their nominees. The party has not endorsed incumbents in most races. Had Paladino received 50,000 votes on the line in 2010 and gained permanent ballot access, the party would have had to put together an organizational structure. The party's name derives from the motto "taxed enough already," the acronym of which (TEA) forms the basis of the TEA Party movement. Paladino received significant supported from the Tea Party movement.

The party had ceased active campaigning due to Paladino earning the endorsement of the Conservative Party until releasing a last-minute advertisement on Election Day.

The now-disbanded Jefferson County chapter of the Independence Party of New York had seen the majority of its leaders switch allegiance to the Taxpayers Party, with the rest supporting the Anti-Prohibition Party of Kristin M. Davis.

The party registered 25,820 votes on election night 2010, leaving it well short of the necessary votes to achieve a permanent ballot line. In portions of Western New York, the line drew vote totals on par with the Working Families Party and the Green Party. The party's founders have not indicated whether or not it will pursue ballot lines in future elections. Rus Thompson, Gary Berntsen and Michael Caputo, who helped organized the party line, orchestrated an attempted ballot access campaign for David Bellavia in the New York's 26th congressional district special election, 2011, but because Paladino and Leonard Roberto endorsed Republican nominee Jane Corwin, the organization used the name "Federalist Party" for Bellavia's petitions instead of the Taxpayers Party. Its former website is now a Japanese-language placeholder.

Paladino endorsed Rob Astorino in the 2014 election; Astorino himself created a similar ballot line, the Stop Common Core Party line, which achieved automatic ballot access with just over 50,000 votes.

== 2010 Comptroller Campaign ==
Thompson, originally on petitions as a dummy candidate, did not actively campaign for the comptroller position, due to both his position as Paladino's campaign treasurer and a desire not to act as a spoiler in the race. He relinquished his spot on the ballot.
