= Freedom Party of New York (2010) =

Party founded in 2010 by Charles Barron

- Leader: Charles Barron
- Founded: June 17, 2010
- Ideology: Anti-capitalism; Anti-imperialism; Black nationalism Left-wing nationalism Left-wing populism Minority rights
- Political position: Far-left
- Colors: Black

The Freedom Party of New York was a political party in the state of New York. It was founded in June 2010 by a former Black Panther Party member and New York City Councilmember Charles Barron on a Black progressive platform.

== History ==
=== 2010 election ===
Barron founded the Freedom party in protest of the Democratic ticket for the 2010 New York gubernatorial election. Barron was upset that Andrew Cuomo and his ticket were all White Americans, as such, the Freedom party ran an all African American ticket. Barron stated that excluding white people from the party was not racist, as he believes in a "post racial society." He also stated that the party was the realization of the independent African American party dreamed of by Malcolm X and Marcus Garvey. The party also claimed to be a spiritual successor to the Mississippi Freedom Democratic Party, which similarly issued an all black slate of candidates in opposition to the white only slate of Democratic Candidates for the 1964 Democratic National Convention.

The Party's ticket consisted of Councilman Barron for Governor, Eva Doyle, a Buffalo Criterion journalist, for Lieutenant Governor and Ramon Jimenez, a Harvard educated lawyer from the South Bronx known for his racially sensitive cases, for Attorney General. The party claimed to have gotten over 45,000 signatures from all 29 congressional districts in the state, far more than the 15,000 needed to get on the ballot, however, this was short of the 50,000 to become a registered party, and Councilman Lew Fidler expressed doubts that the signatures where legitimate.

Workers World, the Marxist-Leninist newspaper of the Communist Workers World Party endorsed Barron and the Freedom Party, calling them "a break from the imperialist Democratic Party that politically strangles poor and working people." The Buffalo News reported that the Freedom Party was seeing enthusiasm in urban voters from Buffalo, Rochester, and New York City. The party finished sixth out of seven candidates in 2010, with Barron receiving 24,572 votes.

=== Later history ===
The party held an official founding convention February 13–14, 2011 in New York City, adopting a platform of "structural transformation of the political and economic system that included: An equitable redistribution of wealth, progressive taxation, free education from pre-k to post baccalaureate, jobs, reparations, housing, political prisoners, women’s rights, support for youth and seniors, end to police brutality and deadly force, and clean and renewable energy." At the convention, "Borough Coordinators" for all of NYC's boroughs, except Staten Island, were named, and Assemblywoman Inez Barron gave a speech.

The party's website's domain expired in 2012.

Barron continued to attempt to grow the party, running Michael K. Lloyd for New York City Public Advocate in 2013. He was decried for his efforts to continuing to build the Freedom Party by Councilman Lew Fidler, stating that his efforts to build a rival party that would split the Democratic voter base was grounds for Barron to be expelled from the Democratic Party.

Michael K. Greys was the party's nominee in the 2013 New York City mayoral election. He finished in 11th place out of 15 candidates on the ballot with 690 votes. The party did not field a candidate in future elections.
