= Randy Credico =

American comedian (born 1954)

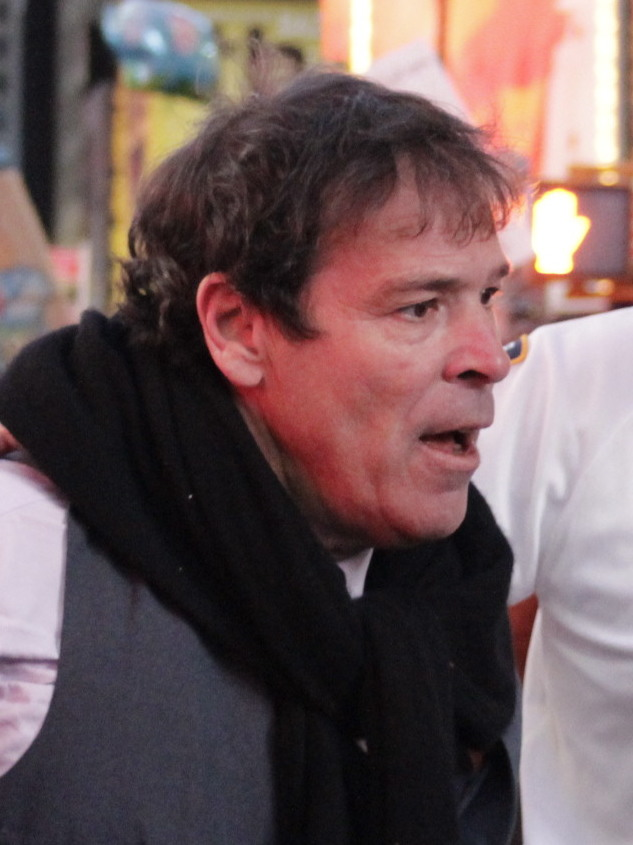
Randy Credico at a 2011 Occupy Wall Street demonstration in Times Square

Randolph A. Credico (born 1954) is an American perennial political candidate, comedian, radio host, and activist, and the former director of the William Moses Kunstler Fund for Racial Justice.

== Entertainment career ==
Credico was formerly active on the comedy circuit, and at the age of 27 made an appearance on The Tonight Show Starring Johnny Carson. During a later appearance, he compared Jeane Kirkpatrick to Eva Braun; he was never invited on the show again.

== Political activism ==
Credico's most significant appearance in the 2016 election cycle was headlining a Republican fund-raiser in Cayuga County, New York.

=== 2010 U.S. Senate election ===
Credico ran as a Democratic primary challenger against Senator Chuck Schumer in 2010. Credico submitted petitions in an effort to get onto the Democratic Party primary ballot. The party chairman claimed that Credico only submitted a few pages' worth of petitions to the state, far short of the 15,000 necessary, a charge Credico denied. Credico threatened to throw his support to Republican candidate Carl Paladino in the gubernatorial race.

=== 2013 mayoral election ===
Credico ran for the Democratic nomination for Mayor of New York City in the 2013 election. He received 12,685 votes (2.0%). He also appeared on the ballot in the general election with 14 other candidates, on the Tax Wall Street line, receiving 654 votes (0.1%).

=== 2014 gubernatorial election ===
Credico challenged incumbent Democratic Governor Andrew Cuomo in the 2014 Democratic primary. He came in third among three candidates, with 20,760 votes (3.6%).

== Connection with Roger Stone and WikiLeaks ==
Arranged by Margaret Ratner Kunstler, a mutual friend who is Julian Assange's attorney, Credico hosted Assange on Credico's August 25, 2016, radio show.

On August 27, 2016, Credico sent a text message to Roger Stone saying, "Julian Assange has kryptonite on Hillary." Credico notified Stone of subsequent releases by WikiLeaks of numerous emails stolen from John Podesta and the Hillary Clinton campaign, a publication which initiated releases of information on October 7, 2016.

In November 2017, Stone told the House Intelligence Committee that Credico was his intermediary with Assange to obtain information on Hillary Clinton. Credico was then subpoenaed to appear before the committee, but asserted his Fifth Amendment right before the interview. The committee released him from appearing. By August 2018, special counsel Mueller had subpoenaed Credico to testify before a grand jury in September 2018. Credico complied with the request.

Mother Jones reported that Credico had received text messages from Stone in January 2018 stating that Stone was seeking a presidential pardon for Assange.

In January 2019, Stone was arrested by the FBI. His indictment claimed that Credico, referred to as "Person 2," was not Stone's sole contact with WikiLeaks ("Organization 1"). It also claimed that Credico was pressured by Stone to "stonewall" his testimony before Congress, and to "do a Frank Pentangeli." Among other statements, Stone told Credico to "prepare to die," and that he would "take that dog away from you." Credico relies on a medical support dog. Credico subsequently testified against Stone during Stone's trial in November 2019.

== See also ==
- Timeline of Russian interference in the 2016 United States elections
- Timeline of Russian interference in the 2016 United States elections (July 2016 – election day)
- Timeline of investigations into Trump and Russia (January–June 2018)
- Timeline of investigations into Trump and Russia (July–December 2018)
- Timeline of investigations into Trump and Russia (2019)
