= 2014 New York gubernatorial election =

- November 4, 2014
- Turnout: 33.2% ▼2.2pp
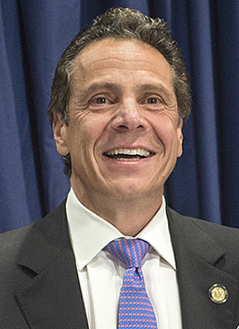

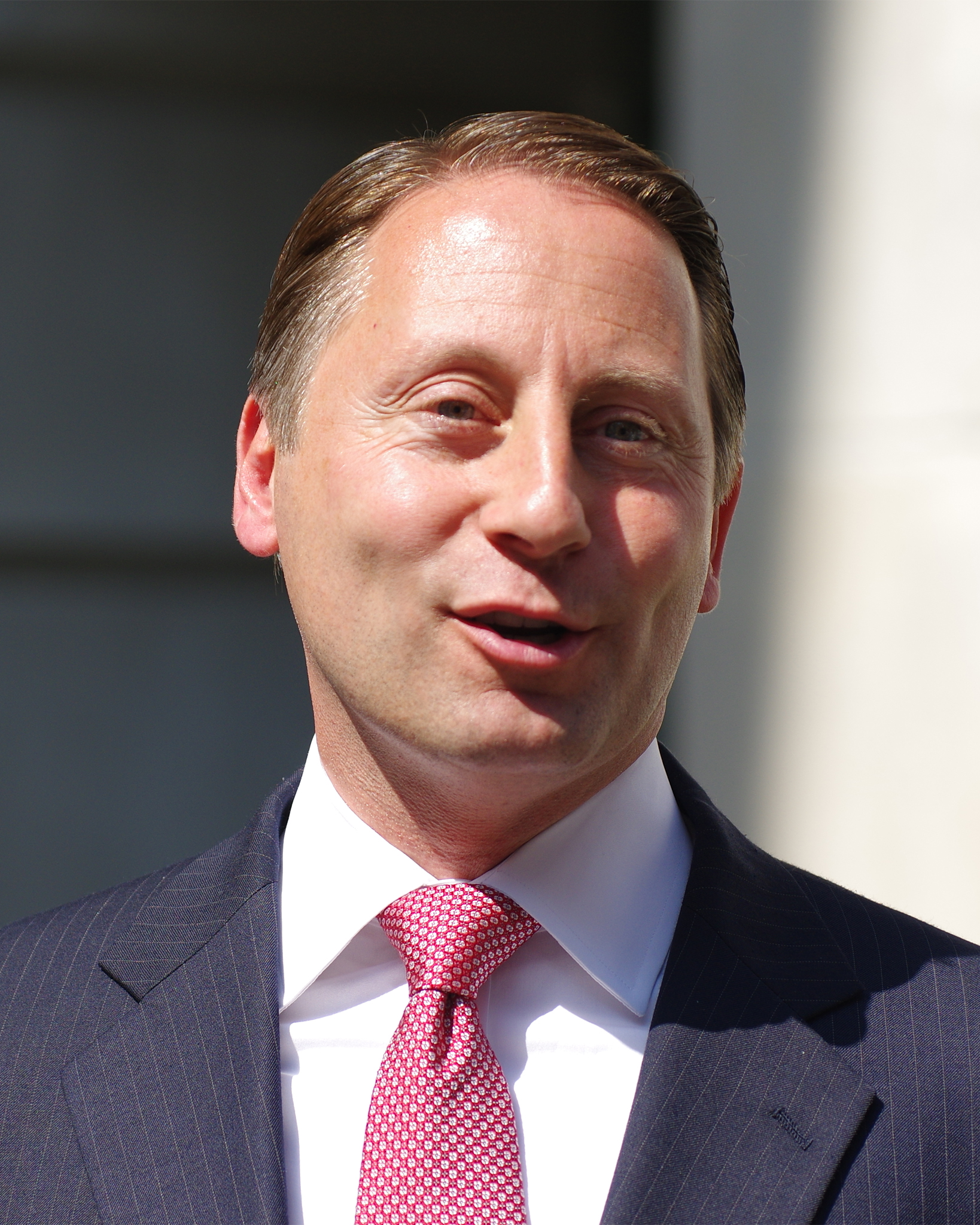
Nominee	Andrew Cuomo	Rob Astorino
Party	Democratic	Republican
Alliance	Parties: Independence; Women's Equality; Working Families	Parties: Conservative; Stop Common Core
Running mate	Kathy Hochul	Chris Moss
Popular vote	2,069,480	1,536,879
Percentage	54.19%	40.24%
- Cuomo: 40–50% 50–60% 70–80% 80–90% >90% Astorino: 40–50% 50–60% 60–70% 70–80%
Governor before election
Andrew Cuomo
Democratic
Elected Governor
Andrew Cuomo
Democratic

The 2014 New York gubernatorial election took place on November 4, 2014. Incumbent Democratic governor Andrew Cuomo sought re-election to a second term in office, though incumbent lieutenant governor Robert Duffy did not seek re-election. Cuomo and his running mate, former U.S. representative Kathy Hochul, won contested primaries, while Republican Rob Astorino, the Westchester County Executive, and his running mate (Chemung County Sheriff Chris Moss) were unopposed for their party's nomination. Astorino and Moss were also cross-nominated by the Conservative Party and the Stop Common Core Party.

Democrat Andrew Cuomo, then serving as Attorney General of New York, was elected governor in 2010. Cuomo defeated Republican businessman Carl Paladino by a nearly 2-to-1 margin, 63% to 33%. Cuomo succeeded retiring Democratic governor David Paterson. Entering the 2014 campaign, Cuomo enjoyed high approval ratings and a large campaign war chest that totaled $33 million as of January 2014. The Cook Political Report, Daily Kos Elections, Governing, RealClearPolitics, The Rothenberg Political Report, and Sabato's Crystal Ball all rated the 2014 New York gubernatorial election as "Safe Democratic". On Election Day, Cuomo and Hochul defeated Astorino and Moss by a margin of 14 percentage points.

This is the last gubernatorial election in which the counties of Clinton, Franklin, and Essex voted Democratic, and the last in which Monroe and Ulster voted Republican.

== Democratic primary ==
Progressive minor parties saw an opportunity to make headway in the state due to Cuomo's relatively conservative stances on taxes and spending. A poll commissioned by businessman and progressive political activist Bill Samuels in March 2014 indicated that even an unknown left-wing third-party challenger on the Working Families Party line could garner between 6% and 13% of the vote without threatening Cuomo's chances of winning re-election. A later poll by the Siena Research Institute taken of 772 registered voters from April 12–17, 2014, with a margin of error of ± 3.5%, found Cuomo taking 39% to Republican candidate Rob Astorino's 24% and an unnamed Working Families Party candidate also at 24%. A Quinnipiac poll conducted in May 2014 produced a similar result to Siena's, with Cuomo at 37%, Astorino at 24% and the third-party candidate at 22%. The Working Families Party nonetheless cross-endorsed Cuomo in a bitterly contested convention vote, leaving Howie Hawkins of the Green Party as the sole progressive challenger assured of a place on the ballot.

In May 2014, after widespread speculation, Lieutenant Governor Robert Duffy confirmed that he would not run for a second term, expressing a desire to return to his home city of Rochester. Byron Brown, the Mayor of Buffalo; Kathy Hochul, a former U.S. representative; Steve Bellone, the current Suffolk County Executive; Kevin Law, the former deputy Suffolk County executive; and Republican Joanie Mahoney, the County Executive of Onondaga County; were considered to be potential replacements. Within the Cuomo administration, potential names included Matt Driscoll, the former mayor of Syracuse; RoAnn Destito, a former Assemblywoman; and Cesar A. Perales, the Secretary of State of New York. Hochul was revealed as Cuomo's running mate during the state Democratic convention on May 21, 2014.

=== Candidates ===
==== Declared ====
- Andrew Cuomo, incumbent governor
  - Running mate: Kathy Hochul, former U.S. representative
- Randy Credico, comedian, activist, Libertarian nominee for the U.S. Senate in 2010 and Tax Wall Street nominee for Mayor of New York City in 2013
  - No running mate
- Zephyr Teachout, associate professor of law at Fordham University
  - Running mate: Tim Wu, professor of law at Columbia University

==== Failed to qualify ====
- Raquel McPherson (removed from ballot)
- Sam Sloan, chess player, publisher, Libertarian candidate for governor in 2010 and War Veterans nominee for Mayor of New York City in 2013 (removed from ballot)

- Running mate: Nenad Bach

=== Polling ===
Poll source	Date(s) administered	Sample size	Margin of error	Andrew Cuomo	Zephyr Teachout	Undecided
Public Policy Polling	September 4–5, 2014	513	± 4%	58%	26%	16%

Poll source	Date(s) administered	Sample size	Margin of error	Kathy Hochul	Tim Wu	Undecided
Public Policy Polling	September 4–5, 2014	513	± 4%	45%	26%	29%

=== Results ===
Primary elections were held on September 9, 2014.

Results by county: Cuomo—80–90% Cuomo—70–80% Cuomo—60–70% Cuomo—50–60% Cuomo—40–50% Teachout—40–50% Teachout—50–60% Teachout—60–70% Teachout—70–80%

Democratic Party gubernatorial primary results
Party	Candidate	Votes	%
Democratic	Andrew Cuomo (incumbent)	361,380	62.92%
Democratic	Zephyr Teachout	192,210	33.47%
Democratic	Randy Credico	20,760	3.61%
Total votes		574,350	100.00%

Democratic Party lieutenant gubernatorial primary results
Party	Candidate	Votes	%
Democratic	Kathy Hochul	329,089	60.20%
Democratic	Tim Wu	217,614	39.80%
Total votes		546,703	100.00%

== Republican primary ==
No Republican gubernatorial primary was held in 2014.

It was believed that the Republicans would nominate someone who was not up for re-election in 2014 and so did not have to give up their office to run, and who would use the campaign to raise their profile for a more competitive statewide bid in the future. Rob Astorino, the Westchester County Executive and the only Republican to enter the race, was not up for re-election until 2017. Business magnate and television personality Donald Trump flirted with a run, but decided against it, instead running for president as a Republican in 2016 and winning. Other potential candidates who did not run were former U.S. representative Vito Fossella, Dutchess County Executive Marcus Molinaro and businessman and 2010 candidate for New York State Comptroller Harry Wilson.

Assemblywomen Jane Corwin and Nicole Malliotakis both declined overtures to be the party's nominee for lieutenant governor, as did Rensselaer County Executive Kathleen M. Jimino and former United States Attorney for the Western District of New York Michael A. Battle. On May 13, Astorino announced Chemung County Sheriff Chris Moss as his running mate.

On May 15, 2014, the Republican Party nominated Astorino for Governor of New York and Moss for Lieutenant Governor of New York.

=== Candidates ===
==== Declared ====
- Rob Astorino, Westchester County Executive
  - Running mate: Chris Moss, Sheriff of Chemung County

==== Declined ====
- John Catsimatidis, businessman and candidate for Mayor of New York City in 2013
- Chris Collins, U.S. representative and former Erie County Executive
- Edward F. Cox, lawyer, chairman of the New York Republican State Committee and candidate for the U.S. Senate in 2006
- Greg Edwards, Chautauqua County Executive and nominee for Lieutenant Governor of New York in 2010
- Chris Gibson, U.S. representative
- Christopher Jacobs, Erie County Clerk and former Secretary of State of New York
- Steven McLaughlin, New York State Assemblyman
- Carl Paladino, Buffalo Public Schools Board of Education member and nominee for governor in 2010
- Donald Trump, business magnate and television personality

== Major third parties ==
Besides the Democratic and Republican parties, the Conservative, Green, Independence and Working Families parties are qualified New York parties. These parties have automatic ballot access.

=== Conservative ===
Conservative Party chairman Michael R. Long endorsed Rob Astorino in February 2014. Buffalo Public Schools Board of Education member and 2010 Republican gubernatorial nominee Carl Paladino originally stated he would seek the Conservative Party nomination if the Republicans nominated Astorino; however, by March 2014, Paladino indicated that he would not run for governor in 2014 and would support Astorino if Donald Trump did not run. On May 31, 2014, the Party nominated Astorino and Moss for governor and lieutenant governor, respectively.

==== Nominee ====
- Rob Astorino, Republican nominee

=== Green ===
In contrast to the other qualified parties, the Green Party of New York traditionally endorses its own candidates. The party held its nominating convention on May 17, 2014.

==== Nominee ====
- Howie Hawkins, labor activist and Green Party nominee for governor in 2010
  - Running mate: Brian Jones, teacher, activist and actor from New York City

=== Independence ===
The Independence Party of New York, which traditionally cross-endorses the candidate most likely to get them the most votes, was expected to nominate incumbent governor Andrew Cuomo as it did in 2010. Republican Rob Astorino refused the line, and several members of the Democratic Party called on Cuomo to do the same.

Despite the controversy, Cuomo accepted the nomination on May 22, 2014.

==== Nominee ====
- Andrew Cuomo, incumbent governor

=== Working Families ===
The Working Families Party traditionally cross-endorses Democrats, but many of its members (most of which are labor unions) have expressed reservations over endorsing incumbent governor Andrew Cuomo as they did in 2010.

The WFP convention, held on May 31, chose Cuomo over professor Zephyr Teachout by a 59%–41% margin in a contentious floor vote. Cuomo's supporters negotiated an agreement in which the governor would support the party agenda in exchange for their vote, expressly attempting to keep the party line solely as a second line for the Democrats; this agreement was met with widespread and vocal skepticism from Teachout's supporters, who insisted the WFP hold to its principles and that Cuomo could not be trusted to hold up to his end of the bargain.

==== Candidates ====
===== Nominee =====
- Andrew Cuomo, incumbent governor

===== Declared =====
- Howie Hawkins, presumptive Green Party nominee
- Zephyr Teachout, law professor at Fordham University

===== Declined =====
- Diane Ravitch, former Assistant Secretary of Education
- Bill Samuels, activist. Samuels instead announced his intent to pursue the lieutenant governor line in the Democratic primary, a position he also considered pursuing in 2010. Samuels dropped out of the race after Teachout lost the WFP nomination to Cuomo, thus implying that Samuels was planning to be Teachout's running mate.

== Minor third parties ==
Any candidate not among the six qualified New York parties (Democratic, Republican, Conservative, Green, Independence and Working Families) must petition their way onto the ballot; they do not face primary elections. Independent nominating petitions began collecting signatures on July 8 and were due to the state by August 19.

=== Libertarian ===
The Libertarian Party of New York held its nominating convention on April 26, 2014. The nominating process required five rounds of voting, after which Michael McDermott was nominated.

==== Candidates ====
===== Nominee =====
- Michael McDermott, real estate broker and nominee for New York's 3rd congressional district in 2012
  - Running mate: Chris Edes, nominee for the U.S. Senate in 2012

===== Unsuccessful =====
- Richard Cooper, resident of Westbury
- Randy Credico, comedian, activist, Libertarian nominee for the U.S. Senate in 2010 and Tax Wall Street nominee for Mayor of New York City in 2013
- Nathan Lebron, information technology specialist and perennial candidate

===== Declined =====
- Kristin M. Davis, former madam and Anti-Prohibition Party nominee for governor in 2010
- Bill Schmidt

=== Sapient ===
- Steven Cohn, Long Island attorney who attempted to run on a "Tea Party" line in the 2010 election but had his petitions rejected
  - Running mate: Bobby Kalotee

The party initially filed with Kendy Guzman as the running mate. As of August 26, Guzman had turned down the nomination and was replaced with Kalotee, the former chairman of the forcibly-dissolved Nassau County wing of the Independence Party.

Cohn is the only candidate on the ballot who did not participate in the lone gubernatorial debate.

=== Stop Common Core ===
The "Stop Common Core Party" (renamed after the election to the Reform Party) is a single-issue ballot line conceived by Republican nominee Rob Astorino.

==== Nominee ====
- Rob Astorino, Republican nominee

=== Women's Equality ===
The Women's Equality Party is a political party created by Gov. Andrew Cuomo and his allies. The Party was designed to take advantage of New York's electoral fusion laws, which allow candidates to appear on multiple parties' lines in the same election. The Party is named after the Women's Equality Act, a bill that failed in the New York State Senate in 2013 and 2014 due to a stalemate over an abortion rights provision in the bill.

The formation of the Party was particularly controversial among feminists (particularly Zephyr Teachout, Cuomo's primary opponent) and was noted for its use of questionable campaign imagery, particularly a tour bus that bore a striking resemblance to a box of Tampax tampons. Additionally, the Working Families Party asserted that the formation of the Women's Equality Party was an attempt to undermine the WFP as a viable party in New York politics.

==== Nominee ====
- Andrew Cuomo, incumbent governor

=== Failed to make ballot ===
- Socialist Workers Party: For the second straight election, the Socialist Workers Party waged a write-in candidacy for the governor's seat, with John Studer as the nominee.
- Constitution Party: Donna Mulvihill, a homeschooling activist from Honeoye Lake, sought petitions to run for governor on the Constitution Party line before abruptly withdrawing from the race the day before petitions were due, citing her father's death. This is the second consecutive election in which the party has failed to collect enough signatures for governor.
- Life and Justice Party: Disability rights activist Michael Carey submitted petitions to form a Life and Justice Party with himself as the gubernatorial candidate and with Republican lieutenant governor nominee Chris Moss listed as his running mate. Moss did not accept his designation as the lieutenant governor candidate on the Life and Justice line. The petitions were later ruled invalid.
- Liberal Party of New York: No candidate. The party openly discussed cross-endorsing incumbent governor Cuomo in an effort to regain ballot access but never did so.
- Rent Is Too Damn High Party: Perennial candidate Jimmy McMillan made a fourth attempt at running for governor on his self-created line, with Christialle Felix as his running mate. His petitions were later challenged and invalidated after it was discovered McMillan had photocopied many of the petitions to give the appearance of more signatures.

== General election ==
In July 2014, Astorino called for New Jersey governor Chris Christie to resign his position as chair of the Republican Governors Association due to his refusal to support Astorino's campaign, which Christie publicly characterized as a "lost cause." Astorino claimed that Christie refused to support him due to Christie's relationship with Cuomo.

=== Debates ===
- Complete video of debate, October 22, 2014

=== Predictions ===
Source	Ranking	As of
The Cook Political Report	Solid D	November 3, 2014
Sabato's Crystal Ball	Safe D	November 3, 2014
Rothenberg Political Report	Safe D	November 3, 2014
Real Clear Politics	Safe D	November 3, 2014

=== Polling ===
Poll source	Date(s) administered	Sample size	Margin of error	Andrew Cuomo (D)	Rob Astorino (R)	Howie Hawkins (G)	Other	Undecided
Zogby Analytics	October 28–31, 2014	681	± 3.8%	55%	34%	—	11%	
Marist College	October 26–28, 2014	503	± 4.4%	56%	30%	6%	1%	7%
CBS News/NYT/YouGov	October 16–23, 2014	4,506	± 2%	56%	31%	—	1%	11%
Siena College	October 16–20, 2014	748	± 3.6%	54%	33%	9%	1%	4%
Quinnipiac University	October 1–6, 2014	1,153	± 2.9%	51%	31%	9%	1%	8%
Quinnipiac University	October 1–6, 2014	1,153	± 2.9%	55%	34%	—	2%	9%
CBS News/NYT/YouGov	September 20–October 1, 2014	5,122	± 2%	57%	30%	—	2%	11%
Rasmussen Reports	September 22–23, 2014	825	± 4%	49%	32%	—	7%	12%
Siena College	September 18–23, 2014	809	± 3.4%	56%	27%	7%	0%	10%
Marist College	September 17–21, 2014	517	± 4.3%	54%	29%	9%	1%	8%
CBS News/NYT/YouGov	August 18–September 2, 2014	5,645	± 2%	52%	28%	—	6%	13%
Quinnipiac University	August 14–17, 2014	1,034	± 3.1%	52%	27%	7%	—	14%
Quinnipiac University	August 14–17, 2014	1,034	± 3.1%	56%	28%	—	2%	15%
Marist College	July 28–31, 2014	852	± 3.4%	54%	23%	7%	1%	16%
CBS News/NYT/YouGov	July 5–24, 2014	6,788	± ?	56%	32%	—	3%	10%
Siena College	July 13–16, 2014	774	± 3.5%	60%	23%	6%	0%	11%
Marist College	June 23–July 1, 2014	833	± 3.4%	59%	24%	6%	1%	11%
Siena College	June 8–12, 2014	835	± 3.4%	57%	21%	4%	1%	16%
Quinnipiac University	May 14–19, 2014	1,129	± 2.9%	57%	28%	—	2%	14%
Siena College	April 12–17, 2014	772	± 3.5%	58%	28%	—	—	14%
Siena College	March 16–20, 2014	813	± 3.4%	61%	26%	—	—	13%
Marist College	February 28–March 3, 2014	658	± 3.8%	65%	25%	—	—	10%
Quinnipiac University	February 6–10, 2014	1,488	± 2.5%	58%	24%	—	2%	16%
Siena College	January 12–16, 2014	808	± 3.4%	67%	19%	—	3%	11%
Quinnipiac University	November 20–24, 2013	1,337	± 2.7%	56%	25%	—	2%	17%
Marist College	November 18–20, 2013	675	± 3.8%	65%	23%	—	—	12%
Siena College	November 11–14, 2013	806	± 3.5%	63%	24%	—	—	13%

Hypothetical polling

Poll source	Date(s) administered	Sample size	Margin of error	Andrew Cuomo (D)	Edward F. Cox (R)	Other	Undecided
Siena College	November 11–14, 2013	806	± 3.5%	62%	25%	—	13%

Poll source	Date(s) administered	Sample size	Margin of error	Andrew Cuomo (D)	Steven McLaughlin (R)	Other	Undecided
Marist College	November 18–20, 2013	675	± 3.8%	64%	24%	—	12%

Poll source	Date(s) administered	Sample size	Margin of error	Andrew Cuomo (D)	Carl Paladino (R)	Other	Undecided
Marist College	February 28–March 3, 2014	658	± 3.8%	68%	25%	—	7%
Marist College	November 18–20, 2013	675	± 3.8%	67%	24%	—	9%
Siena College	November 11–14, 2013	806	± 3.5%	65%	24%	—	11%

Poll source	Date(s) administered	Sample size	Margin of error	Andrew Cuomo (D)	Donald Trump (R)	Other	Undecided
Marist College	February 28–March 3, 2014	658	± 3.8%	70%	26%	—	4%
Quinnipiac University	February 6–10, 2014	1,488	± 2.5%	63%	26%	2%	9%
Siena College	January 12–16, 2014	808	± 3.4%	70%	22%	4%	4%
Marist College	November 18–20, 2013	675	± 3.8%	70%	24%	—	7%

=== Results ===
New York gubernatorial election, 2014
Party	Candidate	Votes	%	±%
Democratic	Andrew Cuomo	1,811,672	47.44%	−8.58%
Working Families	Andrew Cuomo	126,244	3.31%	−0.01%
Independence	Andrew Cuomo	77,762	2.04%	−1.11%
Women's Equality	Andrew Cuomo	53,802	1.41%	N/A
Total	Andrew Cuomo/Kathy Hochul (incumbent)	2,069,480	54.19%	−8.21%
Republican	Rob Astorino	1,234,951	32.34%	+4.65%
Conservative	Rob Astorino	250,634	6.56%	+1.57%
Stop Common Core	Rob Astorino	51,492	1.35%	N/A
Total	Rob Astorino/Christopher Moss	1,536,879	40.24%	+7.01%
Green	Howie Hawkins/Brian Jones	184,419	4.83%	+3.54%
Libertarian	Michael McDermott/Chris Edes	16,769	0.44%	−0.60%
Sapient	Steven Cohn/Bobby Kalotee	4,963	0.13%	N/A
Write ins	Write ins	6,378	0.17%	
Total votes		3,819,086	100.0%	N/A
Democratic hold				

==== New York City results ====
2014 gubernatorial election in New York City		Manhattan	The Bronx	Brooklyn	Queens	Staten Island	Total	
Democratic	Andrew Cuomo	203,080	120,007	236,357	179,742	43,725	782,911	77.08%
Democratic	Andrew Cuomo	79.5%	86.5%	78.5%	74.8%	54.7%	782,911	77.08%
Republican	Rob Astorino	32,656	15,288	44,726	50,600	34,180	177,450	17.47%
Republican	Rob Astorino	12.8%	11.0%	14.9%	21.0%	42.7%	177,450	17.47%

==== By county ====
County	Andrew Cuomo Democratic		Rob Astorino Republican		All others		Margin		Total votes cast
County	#	%	#	%	#	%	#	%	Total votes cast
Albany	38,498	44.6%	35,061	40.6%	12,762	14.8%	3,437	4.0%	86,321
Allegany	3,036	25.5%	8,393	70.6%	462	3.9%	-5,357	-45.1%	11,891
Bronx	120,007	86.5%	15,288	11.0%	3,472	2.5%	104,719	75.5%	138,767
Broome	26,371	50.6%	22,353	42.9%	3,426	6.5%	4,018	7.7%	52,150
Cattaraugus	6,425	33.8%	11,885	62.5%	716	3.7%	-5,460	-28.7%	19,026
Cayuga	9,177	43.4%	10,570	50.0%	1,414	6.7%	-1,393	-6.6%	21,161
Chautauqua	13,163	38.4%	19,771	57.7%	1,341	4.0%	-6,608	-19.3%	34,274
Chemung	8,535	37.5%	13,540	59.5%	690	3.0%	-5,005	-22.0%	22,765
Chenango	4,356	36.3%	6,784	56.6%	853	7.2%	-2,428	-20.3%	11,993
Clinton	10,809	55.6%	7,697	39.6%	936	4.9%	3,112	16.0%	19,442
Columbia	8,403	40.9%	9,772	47.5%	2,387	11.6%	-1,369	-6.6%	20,562
Cortland	4,396	37.3%	6,224	52.8%	1,158	9.8%	-1,828	-15.5%	11,778
Delaware	4,341	34.0%	7,446	58.3%	974	7.7%	-3,105	-24.3%	12,761
Dutchess	33,306	44.1%	37,832	50.1%	4,397	5.8%	-4,526	-6.0%	75,535
Erie	125,617	52.4%	103,801	43.3%	10,302	5.8%	21,816	9.1%	239,720
Essex	5,722	52.9%	4,422	40.9%	668	6.2%	1,300	12.0%	10,812
Franklin	5,057	48.8%	4,698	45.3%	615	6.0%	359	3.5%	10,370
Fulton	3,964	29.2%	8,907	65.5%	726	5.3%	-4,943	-36.3%	13,597
Genesee	4,285	26.5%	11,320	70.0%	558	3.5%	-7,035	-43.5%	16,163
Greene	4,920	32.3%	9,175	60.3%	1,115	7.3%	-7,035	-28.0%	16,163
Hamilton	647	27.0%	1,611	67.2%	139	5.8%	-964	-40.2%	2,397
Herkimer	5,325	35.1%	8,755	57.8%	1,077	7.1%	-3,430	-22.7%	15,157
Jefferson	10,700	45.1%	11,853	50.0%	1,172	4.9%	-1,153	-4.9%	23,725
Kings	236,357	78.5%	44,726	14.9%	19,927	6.6%	191,631	63.6%	301,010
Lewis	2,343	34.5%	4,073	59.9%	381	5.6%	-1,730	-25.4%	6,797
Livingston	4,985	27.0%	12,663	68.6%	808	4.3%	-7,678	-41.6%	18,456
Madison	7,135	38.9%	9,656	52.7%	1,545	8.5%	-2,521	-13.8%	18,336
Monroe	94,595	46.9%	96,933	48.0%	10,229	5.1%	-2,338	-2.9%	201,757
Montgomery	4,464	35.0%	7,534	59.0%	761	6.0%	-3,070	-24.0%	12,759
Nassau	168,570	52.8%	140,842	44.1%	9,688	3.1%	27,728	8.7%	319,100
New York	203,080	79.5%	32,656	12.8%	19,813	7.8%	170,424	66.7%	255,549
Niagara	22,622	42.5%	28,877	54.2%	1,739	3.2%	-6,255	-11.7%	53,238
Oneida	22,621	44.3%	25,045	49.1%	3,342	6.6%	-2,424	-4.8%	51,008
Onondaga	69,759	51.7%	53,487	39.7%	11,587	8.5%	16,092	12.0%	134,653
Ontario	11,247	35.0%	19,336	60.2%	1,540	4.8%	-8,089	-25.2%	32,123
Orange	37,617	43.5%	45,137	52.2%	3,712	4.3%	-7,520	-8.7%	86,466
Orleans	2,318	24.6%	6,778	72.0%	319	3.4%	-4,460	-47.4%	9,415
Oswego	11,017	38.1%	16,033	55.5%	1,850	6.4%	-5,016	-17.4%	28,900
Otsego	6,097	38.2%	8,032	50.4%	1,812	11.4%	-1,935	-12.2%	15,941
Putnam	11,325	41.2%	15,042	54.8%	1,089	4.0%	-3,717	-13.6%	27,456
Queens	179,742	74.8%	50,600	21.0%	10,115	4.2%	129,142	53.8%	240,457
Rensselaer	16,481	35.5%	24,848	53.5%	5,125	11.1%	-8,367	-18.0%	46,454
Richmond	43,725	54.7%	34,180	42.7%	2,080	2.5%	9,545	12.0%	79,985
Rockland	37,453	51.5%	32,914	45.2%	2,422	3.3%	4,539	6.3%	72,789
Saratoga	24,866	36.6%	37,105	54.6%	6,016	8.9%	-12,239	-18.0%	67,987
Schenectady	17,713	40.6%	21,445	49.1%	4,509	10.3%	-3,732	-8.5%	43,667
Schoharie	2,741	27.9%	6,240	63.5%	847	8.6%	-3,499	-35.6%	9,828
Schuyler	1,890	31.6%	3,660	61.2%	431	7.2%	-1,770	-29.6%	5,981
Seneca	3,330	36.2%	5,263	57.3%	595	6.5%	-1,933	-21.1%	9,188
St. Lawrence	11,407	46.0%	11,766	47.5%	1,605	6.5%	-359	-1.5%	24,778
Steuben	8,458	30.6%	18,250	66.1%	898	3.2%	-9,792	-35.5%	27,606
Suffolk	155,031	47.9%	156,351	48.3%	12,258	3.8%	-1,320	0.4%	323,640
Sullivan	6,278	36.1%	10,005	57.6%	1,096	6.3%	-3,727	-21.5%	17,379
Tioga	5,082	37.6%	7,636	56.5%	798	5.8%	-2,554	-18.9%	13,516
Tompkins	13,850	53.3%	7,552	29.1%	4,572	17.6%	6,298	24.2%	25,974
Ulster	22,080	42.3%	23,934	45.9%	6,174	11.9%	-1,854	-3.6%	52,188
Warren	6,767	35.4%	10,605	55.5%	1,721	9.1%	-3,838	-20.1%	19,093
Washington	4,866	32.6%	8,699	58.3%	1,367	9.2%	-3,833	-25.7%	14,932
Wayne	7,130	28.6%	16,690	67.0%	1,095	4.4%	-9,560	-40.4%	24,915
Westchester	123,017	55.3%	92,441	41.6%	6,820	3.1%	30,576	13.7%	222,278
Wyoming	2,455	21.6%	8,596	75.6%	323	2.8%	-6,141	-54.0%	11,374
Yates	2,086	31.9%	4,091	62.6%	359	5.4%	-2,005	-30.7%	6,536
Totals	2,069,480	54.2%	1,536,879	40.2%	212,925	5.6%	532,601	14.0%	3,819,284

Counties that flipped from Democratic to Republican

- Cayuga (largest municipality: Auburn)
- Chemung (largest municipality: Elmira)
- Chenango (largest municipality: Norwich)
- Columbia (largest municipality: Hudson)
- Cortland (largest municipality: Cortland)
- Delaware (largest municipality: Sidney)
- Dutchess (County Seat: Poughkeepsie)
- Greene (largest municipality: Catskill)
- Herkimer (largest municipality: German Flatts)
- Jefferson (largest municipality: Le Ray)
- Lewis (largest municipality: Lowville)
- Livingston (largest municipality: Geneseo)
- Madison (largest municipality: Oneida)
- Monroe (largest municipality: Rochester)
- Montgomery (largest municipality: Amsterdam)
- Oneida (largest municipality: Utica)
- Ontario (largest municipality: Geneva)
- Orange (largest municipality: Kiryas Joel)
- Oswego (largest municipality: Oswego)
- Otsego (largest municipality: Oneonta)
- Putnam (largest municipality: Lake Carmel)
- Rensselaer (County Seat: Troy)
- St. Lawrence (largest municipality: Massena)
- Saratoga (largest municipality: Saratoga Springs)
- Schenectady (largest municipality: Schenectady)
- Schuyler (largest municipality: Watkins Glen)
- Seneca (largest municipality: Seneca Falls)
- Suffolk (largest municipality: Brookhaven)
- Sullivan (largest municipality: Monticello)
- Ulster (largest municipality: Kingston)
- Warren (largest municipality: Glens Falls)
- Washington (largest municipality: Hudson Falls)
- Wayne (largest municipality: Newark)
- Yates (largest municipality: Penn Yan)

Counties that flipped from Republican to Democratic

- Erie (largest municipality: Buffalo)

==== By congressional district ====
Cuomo won 18 of 27 congressional districts. Both candidates won two districts held by the other party.

District	Cuomo	Astorino	Representative
1st	47%	49%	Lee Zeldin
2nd	47%	50%	Peter T. King
3rd	52%	44%	Steve Israel
4th	54%	43%	Kathleen Rice
5th	84%	14%	Gregory Meeks
6th	67%	29%	Grace Meng
7th	80%	11%	Nydia Velázquez
8th	85%	11%	Hakeem Jeffries
9th	82%	12%	Yvette Clarke
10th	74%	17%	Jerry Nadler
11th	56%	41%	Dan Donovan
12th	74%	18%	Carolyn Maloney
13th	89%	6%	Charles Rangel
14th	75%	20%	Joe Crowley
15th	93%	6%	Jose E. Serrano
16th	66%	31%	Eliot Engel
17th	53%	44%	Nita Lowey
18th	45%	51%	Sean Patrick Maloney
19th	37%	53%	Chris Gibson
20th	42%	46%	Paul Tonko
21st	41%	52%	Elise Stefanik
22nd	43%	50%	Richard Hanna
23rd	37%	57%	Tom Reed
24th	47%	45%	John Katko
25th	48%	47%	Louise Slaughter
26th	59%	36%	Brian Higgins
27th	35%	61%	Chris Collins

== Analysis ==
Cuomo handily defeated Astorino by a 54.19%-40.24% margin, although this margin was smaller than Cuomo's victory margin in 2010. Cuomo won all five counties of New York City, along with Westchester, Rockland, and Nassau counties; Hawkins's presence on the ballot had a spoiler effect that allowed Astorino to win some Hudson Valley counties that traditionally vote Democratic and carry the Upstate region as a whole. Cuomo carried New York City 77.08% to 17.47% (782,911 votes to 177,450 votes), while narrowly losing the Upstate 45.89% to 48.49% (1,286,569 votes to 1,359,429 votes).

The Green Party took Row D on the ballot, surpassing the Independence and Working Families Parties (both of whom lost significant vote share but still qualified for automatic ballot status through 2018) but not surpassing the Conservative Party, which retained Row C with 6 percent of the vote. The Libertarian Party, after a 2010 showing in which it narrowly fell short of the 50,000 votes needed for automatic ballot access, missed that measure by a wide margin in 2014; the Party's candidate earned less than 17,000 votes. The Sapient Party was a non-factor with fewer than 5,000 votes. Two new political parties—the Women's Equality Party and the Stop Common Core Party—surpassed the 50,000-vote threshold and attained automatic ballot status.
