= 2014 New York State Comptroller election =

2014 New York Comptroller election
- November 4, 2014
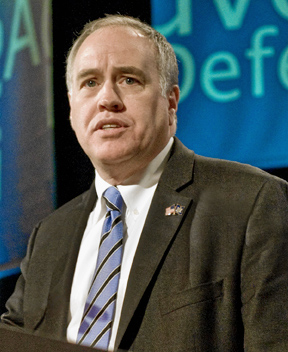

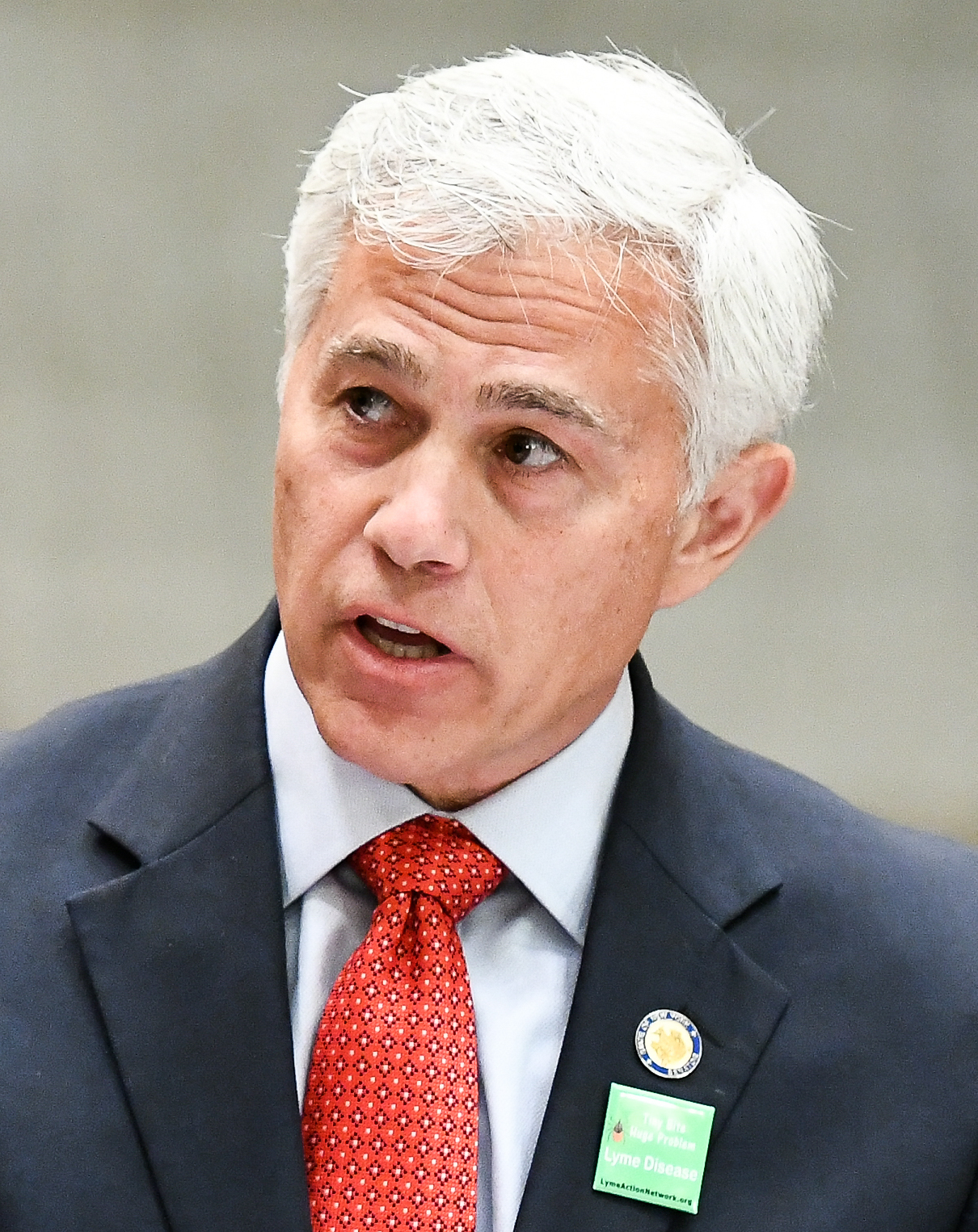
Nominee	Thomas DiNapoli	Bob Antonacci
Party	Democratic	Republican
Alliance	Working Families	Conservative
Popular vote	2,233,057	1,354,643
Percentage	60.14%	36.48%
- County results DiNapoli: 40–50% 50–60% 60–70% 70–80% 80–90% Antonacci: 40–50% 50–60% 60–70%
Comptroller before election
Thomas DiNapoli
Democratic
Elected Comptroller
Thomas DiNapoli
Democratic

The 2014 New York Comptroller election took place on November 4, 2014, to elect the New York State Comptroller. Incumbent Democratic Comptroller Thomas DiNapoli was re-elected to a second full term in office.

== Background ==
Incumbent Democratic Comptroller Alan Hevesi was re-elected to a second term in 2006 but resigned a few days before the term would have begun, as part of a plea agreement from charges relating to his use of state employees to chauffeur his wife, who was ill (Hevesi had been convicted before the election but still defeated Christopher Callaghan by 56% to 39%). He was succeeded as Comptroller by Democratic State Assemblyman Thomas DiNapoli, who was elected in a joint session of the New York State Legislature in February 2007. DiNapoli was elected to a full term in 2010 with 51% of the vote.

Despite DiNapoli's relatively narrow win in 2010, Republicans do not believe that he is vulnerable because "Comptrollers seem to get re-elected as long as they do their jobs." They are instead concentrating their efforts on defeating Attorney General Eric Schneiderman, citing numerous reasons, including the fact that DiNapoli comes from Nassau County, as opposed to Schneiderman, who comes from the Upper West Side of Manhattan. Republicans initially found it extremely difficult to find even a paper candidate to fill the ballot line, with the Conservative Party saying it would nominate its own candidate if the Republicans didn't find someone. Onondaga County Comptroller Bob Antonacci stepped forward for the Republicans in May 2014.

Under a pilot program approved by the New York State Legislature as part of the 2014 state budget, the comptroller election was to be the first statewide election in New York to be publicly financed. Republican candidate Robert Antonacci agreed to take part in public financing matching funds, noting that he would not have entered the race had those funds not been made available. To qualify for matching funds (which will be taken from a slush fund set aside for money unclaimed by the state's citizens), he had to raise $200,000 from at least 2,000 donors, each of whom are limited to a maximum donation of $175; he can continue to receive much larger donations outside those he seeks to match. DiNapoli did not accept matching funds. Antonacci failed to qualify for matching funds and raised less than half of the money necessary to qualify. Antonacci later expressed dismay toward the New York Republican State Committee for failing to give him financial support and nearly quit the race.

== Democratic primary ==
=== Candidates ===
==== Nominated ====
- Thomas DiNapoli, incumbent Comptroller

==== Withdrew ====
- Geeta Rankoth (removed from ballot)

== Republican primary ==
=== Candidates ===
==== Nominated ====
- Bob Antonacci, Onondaga County Comptroller and candidate for New York Attorney General in 2010

==== Declined ====
- Rob Astorino, Westchester County Executive (running for Governor)
- Christopher Jacobs, Erie County Clerk and former Secretary of State of New York
- Harry Wilson, businessman and nominee for Comptroller in 2010

== Major Third Parties ==
Besides the Democratic and Republican parties, the Conservative, Green, Independence and Working Families parties are qualified New York parties. These parties have automatic ballot access.

=== Conservative ===
==== Candidates ====
===== Nominated =====
- Robert Antonacci, Republican nominee

=== Green ===
==== Candidates ====
===== Nominated =====
- Theresa Portelli, nominee for Mayor of Albany in 2013 and former Albany City school board member

=== Independence ===
==== Candidates ====
===== Nominated =====
- Thomas DiNapoli, incumbent Comptroller

=== Working Families ===
==== Candidates ====
===== Nominated =====
- Thomas DiNapoli, incumbent Comptroller

== Minor third parties ==
Any candidate not among the six qualified New York parties (Democratic, Republican, Conservative, Green, Independence and Working Families) must petition their way onto the ballot; they do not face primary elections. Independent nominating petitions began collecting signatures on July 8 and were due to the state by August 19.

=== Libertarian ===
==== Candidates ====
===== Nominated =====
- John Clifton, perennial candidate

=== Stop Common Core ===
==== Candidates ====
===== Nominated =====
- Robert Antonacci, Republican nominee

=== Women's Equality ===
==== Candidates ====
===== Nominated =====
- Thomas DiNapoli, incumbent Comptroller

== General election ==
=== Polling ===
Poll source	Date(s) administered	Sample size	Margin of error	Thomas DiNapoli (D)	Robert Antonacci (R)	Other	Undecided
Siena College	October 16–20, 2014	748	± 3.6%	58%	31%	0%	10%
Siena College	September 18–23, 2014	809	± 3.4%	56%	27%	—	18%
Quinnipiac University	August 14–17, 2014	1,034	± 3.1%	54%	22%	1%	23%
Siena College	July 13–16, 2014	774	± 3.5%	57%	26%	0%	16%
Siena College	June 8–12, 2014	835	± 3.4%	56%	22%	0%	22%

Hypothetical polling

Poll source	Date(s) administered	Sample size	Margin of error	Thomas DiNapoli (D)	Republican candidate (R)	Depends on candidate	Undecided
Quinnipiac University	May 14–19, 2014	1,129	± 2.9%	50%	29%	5%	16%

=== Results ===
2014 New York State Comptroller Election
Party	Candidate	Votes	Percentage
Democratic	Thomas DiNapoli	1,935,847	52.13%
Working Families	Thomas DiNapoli	175,328	4.72%
Independence/ Women's Equality	Thomas DiNapoli	121,882	3.28%
Total	Thomas DiNapoli (incumbent)	2,233,057	60.14%
Republican	Robert Antonacci	1,108,016	29.84%
Conservative/ Stop-Common-Core	Robert Antonacci	246,627	6.64%
Total	Robert Antonacci	1,354,643	36.48%
Green	Theresa Portelli	97,906	2.64%
Libertarian	John Clifton	26,583	0.72%
Write-in		1,197	0.03%
Totals		3,713,386	100.00%
Democratic Hold			
