= Chris Ryan (politician) =

American politician

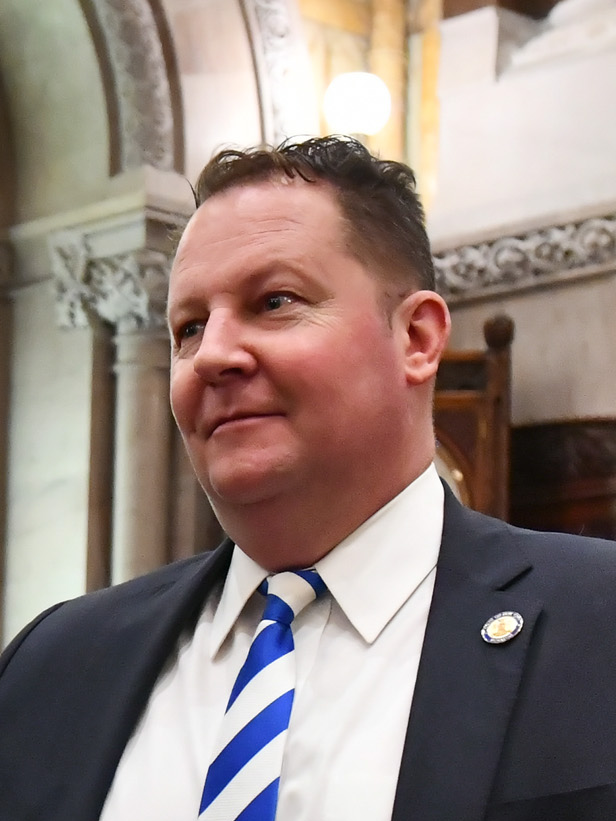
- Ryan in 2025

Member of the New York State Senate from the 50th district
- Incumbent
- Assumed office January 1, 2025
- Preceded by: John Mannion

Personal details
- Born: Syracuse, New York, U.S.
- Party: Democratic
- Education: Onondaga Community College (AA); Buffalo State College (BA)
- Website: State senate website Campaign website

Christopher Ryan is an American politician serving as a member of the New York State Senate for the 50th district since 2025.

== Career ==
Ryan previously served as the Democratic minority leader in the Onondaga County Legislature and as a trade unionist. He was first elected to the legislature in 2011. He is also president of the Communications Workers of America, Local 1123.

Ryan ran on a platform of "good-paying jobs, quality schools, health care access, safe and affordable communities, and smart economic investments for the future."

== Electoral history ==
=== 2024 ===
Ryan’s Central New York seat was an important win for Democrats to maintain their supermajority status, continuing to hold 41 seats in the State Senate.

Previously held by John Mannion since 2021, Mannion vacated the 50th state Senate District seat to run for Congress. The district was long held by Republican John DeFrancisco before Mannion's retirement in 2018.

The seat has remained one of the few competitive districts in the State Senate over several elections. In 2020, Mannion's win wasn't certified until the end of November, and in 2022, Mannion's win reelection was certified by a 10 vote margin.

2024 New York State Senate election, District 50
Primary election
| Party | Candidate | Votes | % |
General election
| Democratic | Chris Ryan | 75,307 | |
| Working Families | Chris Ryan | 6,366 | |
| Total | Chris Ryan | 81,673 | 50.4 |
| Republican | Nick Paro | 70,277 | |
| Conservative | Nick Paro | 9,886 | |
| Total | Nick Paro | 80,163 | 49.5 |
| Write-in | | 114 | 0.1 |
| Total votes | | 161,950 | 100.0 |
| Democratic hold | | | |
