= Tarky Lombardi Jr. =

American politician (1929–2024)

Member of the New York State Senate from the 49th district
- In office January 1, 1966 – December 31, 1992
- Preceded by: Thomas Laverne
- Succeeded by: John A. DeFrancisco
- Constituency: 52nd district (1966); 46th district (1967–1972); 50th district (1973–1982); 49th district (1983–1992)

Personal details
- Born: September 2, 1929 Syracuse, New York, U.S.
- Died: November 24, 2024 (aged 95) Jamesville, New York, U.S.
- Party: Republican
- Spouse: Marianne Lombardi (m. 1958)
- Children: 5
- Education: Syracuse University (BS); Syracuse University College of Law (JD)

Tarky J. Lombardi Jr. (September 2, 1929 – November 24, 2024) was an American politician who was a New York State Senator, representing Central New York for 27 years.

== Early life and education ==
Lombardi was born in Syracuse, New York, on September 2, 1929. He graduated from New York Military Academy in 1947. Lombardi later earned a bachelor's degree in business administration from Syracuse University in 1951 and a juris doctor at the Syracuse University College of Law. He was a founding partner of the law firm Lombardi, Devorsetz, Stinziano, and Smith.

== Political career ==
Lombardi, a Republican, began his political career on the Syracuse Common Council, where he served for six years beginning in 1959.

He then went on to serve as a member of the New York State Senate from 1966 to 1992, representing the Syracuse area. He was Chairman of the Committee on Finance from 1989 to 1992. Lombardi was known as a proponent of community services, including New York's "Nursing Homes Without Walls" program. Lombardi helped earn $15 million in state funding to build the Carrier Dome.

In June 1992, Lombardi opted to not seek reelection for the 49th district, ending his political career. Lombardi returned to practice law at the Syracuse-based firm he founded, now called Devorsetz, Stinziano, Gilberti, Heintz, and Smith.

== Personal life and death ==
Lombardi was married to his wife, Marianne, for 66 years until his death. They had five children. He was a diehard fan of the Syracuse Orange, and the longest season ticket holder in the history of the football program.

Lombardi died from kidney complications at his home in Jamesville, on November 24, 2024, at the age of 95.

New York State Senate
Preceded by Thomas Laverne	New York State Senate; 52nd District; 1966	Succeeded by Earl W. Brydges
Preceded by Robert E. Lynch	New York State Senate; 46th District; 1967–1972	Succeeded by James H. Donovan
Preceded by Thomas Laverne	New York State Senate; 50th District; 1973–1982	Succeeded by Lloyd Stephen Riford Jr.
Preceded by Martin S. Auer	New York State Senate; 49th District; 1983–1992	Succeeded by John A. DeFrancisco
Preceded by John J. Marchi	New York State Senate; Chairman of the Committee on Finance; 1989–1992	Succeeded by Ronald B. Stafford
