= 2026 New York State Comptroller election =

- November 3, 2026
- Reporting: 96% as of Nov 19 at 4:11 PM EST
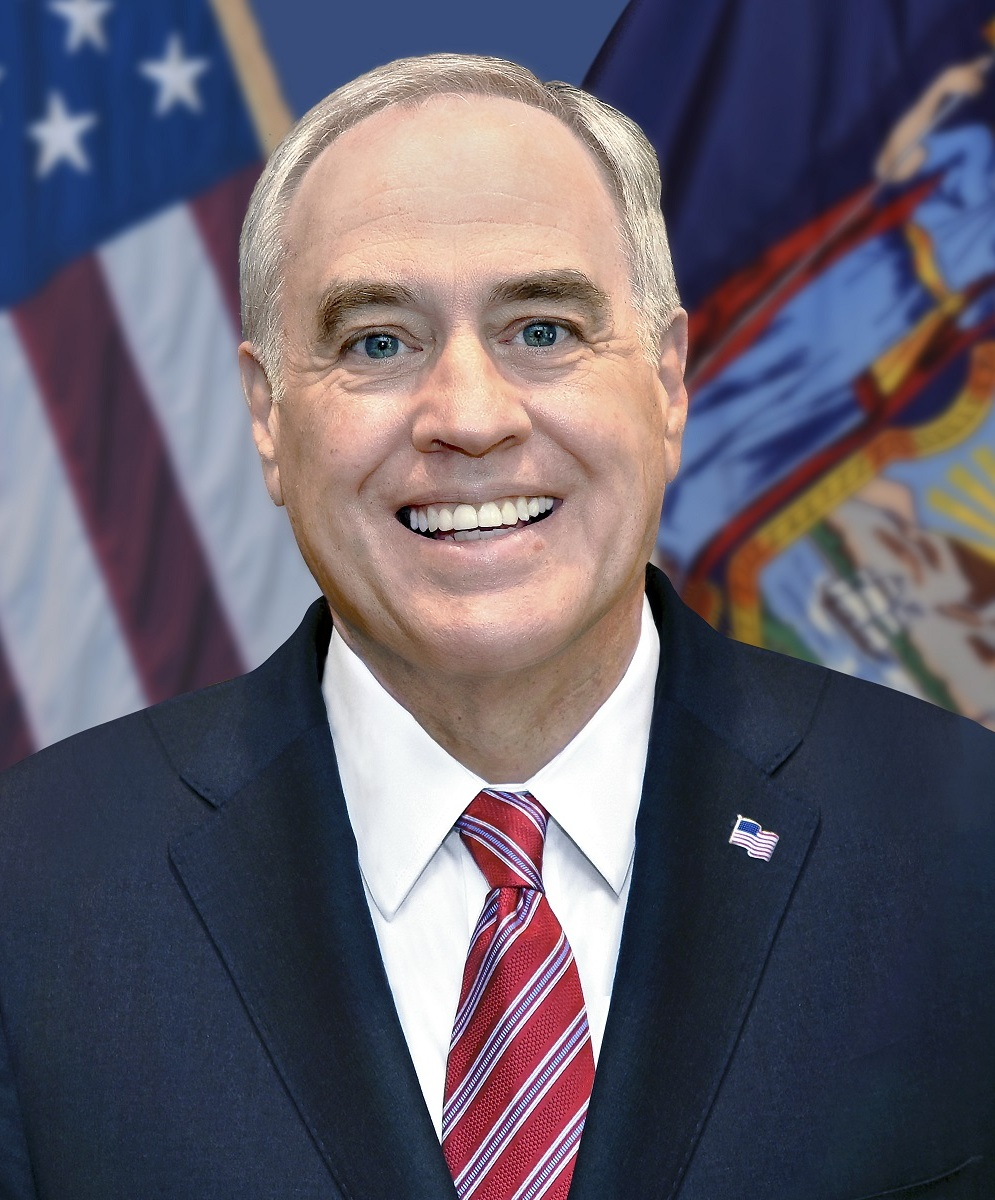

Nominee	Thomas DiNapoli	Joseph Hernandez
Party	Democratic	Republican
Alliance	Working Families	Conservative
Popular vote	3,891,250	2,130,374
Percentage	64.6%	35.3%
- DiNapoli: 50–60% 60–70% 70–80% 80–90% >90% Hernandez: 40–50% 50–60% 60–70% 70–80% 80–90% >90%
Comptroller before election
Thomas DiNapoli
Democratic
Elected Comptroller
Thomas DiNapoli
Democratic

The 2026 New York State Comptroller election took place on November 3, 2026, to elect the state comptroller of New York. Incumbent Democrat Thomas DiNapoli sought re-election to a fifth full term. It was held alongside elections for governor, attorney general, state assembly, state senate, and United States representatives. Primary elections were held on June 23, 2026.

Thomas DiNapoli was reelected to a fifth term.

== Democratic primary ==
=== Background ===
The New York Common Retirement Fund's investment in Palantir, which is indirectly controlled by the comptroller, has become an issue in the primary. Additionally, primary challengers have criticized DiNapoli's handling of unclaimed funds owed to residents, as New York returns a much smaller proportion of funds to their rightful owners compared to several other states, and transfers a large proportion of unclaimed funds yearly to the state's general fund for lawmakers to spend.

=== Candidates ===
==== Nominee ====
- Thomas DiNapoli, incumbent comptroller

==== Eliminated in primary ====
- Raj Goyle, founder of Phone Free New York, former Kansas state representative from the 87th district (2007–2011) and nominee for KS-04 in 2010
- Drew Warshaw, nonprofit executive

==== Disqualified ====
- Adem Bunkedekko, former nonprofit executive and candidate for NY-09 in 2018 and 2020

=== Endorsements ===
Raj Goyle

Executive branch officials

- Preet Bharara, former U.S. attorney for the southern district of New York (2009–2017)

U.S. representatives

- Pramila Jayapal, WA-07 (2017–present)
- Ro Khanna, CA-17 (2017–present)

Local officials

- Ali Najmi, chair of the Mayor’s Advisory Committee on the Judiciary (2026–present)

Individuals

- Zephyr Teachout, attorney

Organizations

- New York Communities for Change
- Progressive Victory Fund
- Sunrise Movement NYC
Thomas DiNapoli

Executive branch officials

- Hillary Clinton, former secretary of state (2009–2013)

U.S. representatives

- Gregory Meeks, NY-05 (1998–present)
- Pat Ryan, NY-18 (2022–present)

Statewide officials

- Letitia James, attorney general of New York (2019–present)

State legislators

- Jamaal Bailey, SD-36 (2017–present) and chair of the Bronx Democratic Party (2020–present)
- Rodneyse Bichotte Hermelyn, AD-42 (2015–present) and chair of the Brooklyn Democratic Party (2020–present)
- Charles Fall, AD-61 (2019–present) and chair of the Staten Island Democratic Party (2025–present)

Party officials

- Keith Wright, chair of the Manhattan Democratic Party (2009–present)

Labor unions

- AFL-CIO New York State
- Civil Service Employees Association
- District Council 37
- Hotel and Gaming Trades Council
- Retail, Wholesale and Department Store Union

Organizations

- New York State Alliance for Retired Americans
- Stonewall Democrats

Political parties

- Brooklyn Democratic Party

Newspapers

- The Irish Echo
Drew Warshaw

State legislators

- Emily Gallagher, AD-50 (2021–present)

Organizations

- Make the Road Action

Labor unions

- International Alliance of Theatrical Stage Employees Local 4
Adem Bunkedekko (disqualified)

U.S. representatives

- Jamaal Bowman, former NY-16 (2021–2025)
Declined to endorse

Political parties

- New York Working Families Party

Newspapers

- The Nation

=== Results ===
DiNapoli: 50–60%; 60–70%; 70–80%; 80–90%

DiNapoli: 30–40%; 40–50%; 50–60%; 60–70%; 70–80%; 80–90%; >90%; Warshaw: 30–40%; 40–50%; 50–60%; 60–70%; 70–80%; 80–90%; >90%; Goyle: 30–40%; 40–50%; 50–60%; 60–70%; 70–80%; 80–90%; >90%; Tied: 30-40%; 40-50%; 50%; No Votes

Democratic primary results
Party	Candidate	Votes	%
Democratic	Thomas DiNapoli (incumbent)	595,011	65.3
Democratic	Drew Warshaw	184,695	20.3
Democratic	Raj Goyle	127,097	14.0
Write-in		3,813	0.4
Total votes		910,616	100.0

== Republican primary ==
=== Candidates ===
==== Nominee ====
- Joseph Hernandez, biotechnology entrepreneur

=== Endorsements ===
Joseph Hernandez

Political parties

- New York Republican State Committee

== General election ==
=== Polling ===
Poll source	Date(s) administered	Sample size	Margin of error	Tom DiNapoli (D)	Joseph Hernandez (R)	Other	Undecided
Siena College	October 19–22, 2026	807 (LV)	± 4.1%	59%	32%	–	10%
Siena College	September 11–17, 2026	1,144 (LV)	± 3.9%	56%	33%	–	12%
Siena College	August 3–6, 2026	811 (LV)	± 4.2%	55%	32%	1% (Note: "Someone else" with 1%)	12%

=== Results ===
2026 New York State Comptroller election
Party	Candidate	Votes	%	±%
Democratic	Tom DiNapoli			
Working Families	Tom DiNapoli			
Total	Tom DiNapoli (incumbent)	3,891,250	64.6	
Republican	Joseph Hernandez			
Conservative	Joseph Hernandez			
Total	Joseph Hernandez	2,130,374	35.3	
Write-in		5,399	0.9	
Total votes		6,027,023	100.0	
Democratic hold				
