= 2022 New York State Comptroller election =

- November 8, 2022
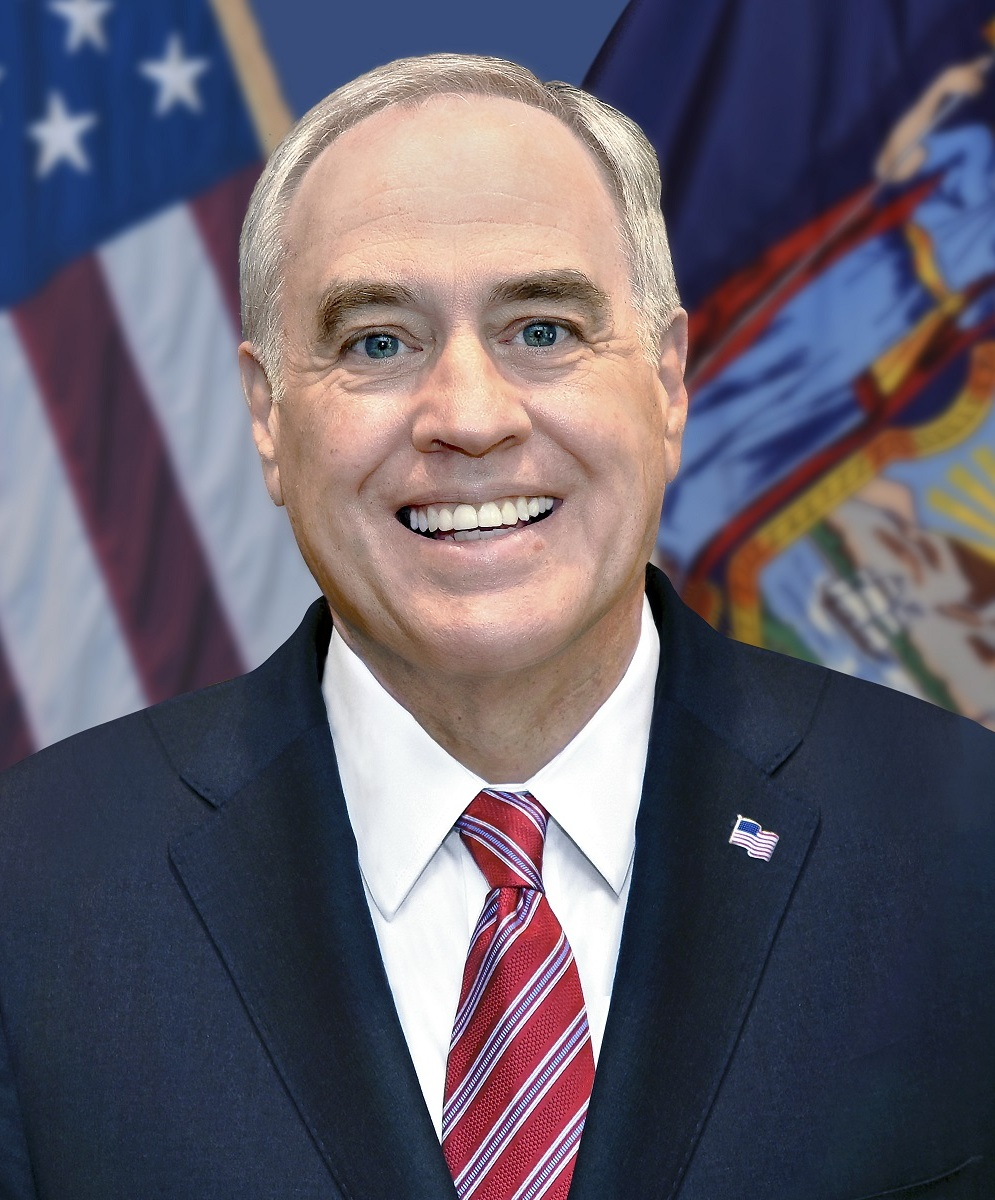

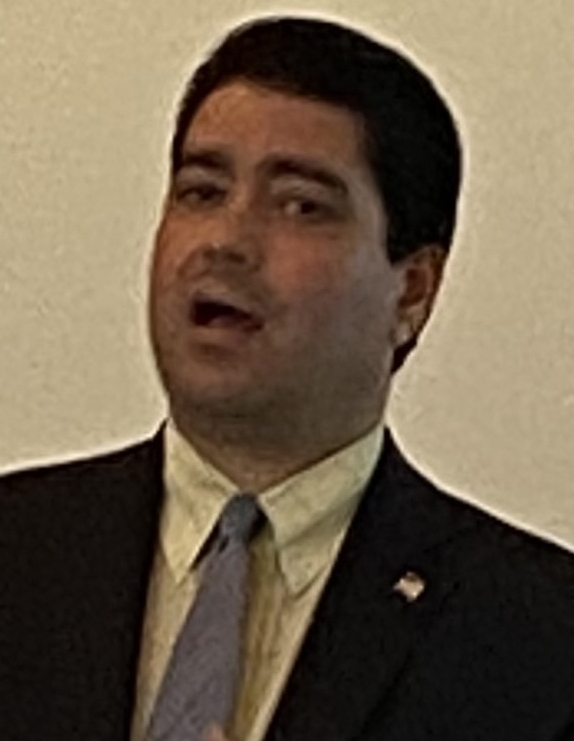
Nominee	Thomas DiNapoli	Paul Rodríguez
Party	Democratic	Republican
Alliance	Working Families	Conservative
Popular vote	3,305,112	2,463,404
Percentage	57.27%	42.68%
- DiNapoli: 50–60% 60–70% 70–80% 80–90% >90% Rodriguez: 40–50% 50–60% 60–70% 70–80% 80–90% >90% Tie: 40–50% 50% No votes
Comptroller before election
Thomas DiNapoli
Democratic
Elected Comptroller
Thomas DiNapoli
Democratic

The 2022 New York State Comptroller election took place on November 8, 2022, to elect the New York State Comptroller. The incumbent Democratic Comptroller Thomas DiNapoli won re-election to a fourth term. Paul Rodríguez, a financial advisor from Queens, was the Republican nominee.

In the general election, DiNapoli carried every county won by Kathy Hochul in the concurrent gubernatorial election as well as Rockland, Broome, Dutchess, Rensselaer, Saratoga, Warren, Essex, Clinton, and Franklin counties.

== Democratic nomination ==
=== Candidates ===
==== Nominee ====
- Thomas DiNapoli, incumbent Comptroller (2007–present)

==== Write-in candidates ====
- Quanda Francis, President of Sykes Capital Management

== Republican nomination ==
=== Candidates ===
==== Nominee ====
- Paul Rodríguez, financial advisor and Conservative Party nominee for New York City Comptroller in 2021

=== Endorsements ===
Paul Rodríguez

Organizations

- New York Young Republican Club

== General election ==
=== Polling ===
Graphical summary

Poll source	Date(s) administered	Sample size (Note: Key: A – all adults RV – registered voters LV – likely voters V – unclear)	Margin of error	Thomas DiNapoli (D)	Paul Rodríguez (R)	Other	Undecided
Siena College	October 12–14, 2022	707 (LV)	± 4.9%	54%	30%	0%	15%
Siena College	September 16–25, 2022	655 (LV)	± 3.9%	52%	29%	1% (Note: "Not going to vote" with 1%)	18%
Siena College	July 24–28, 2022	806 (LV)	± 3.5%	51%	30%	0%	17%

=== Post-primary endorsements ===
Paul Rodríguez (R)

Organizations

- New York Federation of College Republicans

Newspapers

- New York Post

=== Results ===
2022 New York State Comptroller election
Party	Candidate	Votes	%	±%
Democratic	Thomas DiNapoli	2,980,833	51.67%	−10.07%
Working Families	Thomas DiNapoli	324,279	5.62%	+3.03%
Total	Thomas DiNapoli (incumbent)	3,305,112	57.27%	−9.67%
Republican	Paul Rodriguez	2,171,067	37.64%	+10.19%
Conservative	Paul Rodriguez	292,337	5.07%	+1.22%
Total	Paul Rodriguez	2,463,404	42.68%	+11.39%
Write ins	Write ins	2,880	0.05%	+0.02%
Total votes		5,771,396	100.00%	
Democratic hold				

==== By county ====
County	Thomas DiNapoli Democratic		Paul Rodriquez Republican		Write-ins	
County	#	%	#	%	#	%
Albany	77,868	67.28%	37,786	32.65%	82	0.07%
Allegany	4,515	29.04%	11,023	70.91%	8	0.05%
Bronx	147,629	78.28%	40,865	21.67%	108	0.06%
Broome	33,586	50.07%	33,467	49.89%	26	0.04%
Cattaraugus	9,020	35.45%	16,424	64.55%	0	0.0%
Cayuga	11,856	44.65%	14,690	55.33%	6	0.02%
Chautauqua	17,892	41.82%	24,871	58.14%	16	0.04%
Chemung	11,017	40.28%	16,314	59.65%	19	0.07%
Chenango	5,871	35.42%	10,695	64.52%	9	0.05%
Clinton	14,654	54.17%	12,394	45.82%	4	0.01%
Columbia	17,541	59.73%	11,817	40.24%	9	0.03%
Cortland	7,483	46.89%	8,465	53.04%	11	0.07%
Delaware	7,362	40.0%	11,040	59.98%	5	0.03%
Dutchess	58,779	51.82%	54,613	48.15%	39	0.03%
Erie	188,476	56.55%	144,628	43.4%	170	0.05%
Essex	7,930	52.52%	7,169	47.48%	0	0.0%
Franklin	7,613	51.05%	7,298	48.94%	1	0.01%
Fulton	6,674	36.55%	11,583	63.43%	5	0.03%
Genesee	7,253	33.19%	14,594	66.79%	5	0.02%
Greene	8,697	43.88%	11,117	56.09%	5	0.03%
Hamilton	1,065	37.97%	1,740	62.03%	0	0.0%
Herkimer	7,646	34.56%	14,471	65.41%	5	0.02%
Jefferson	11,805	37.91%	19,330	63.07%	5	0.02%
Kings	409,329	74.96%	136,149	24.93%	606	0.11%
Lewis	2,991	29.25%	7,232	70.73%	2	0.02%
Livingston	9,263	38.85%	14,575	61.12%	7	0.03%
Madison	11,433	44.1%	14,473	55.83%	17	0.07%
Monroe	156,561	57.65%	114,894	42.31%	127	0.05%
Montgomery	6,471	41.84%	8,989	58.12%	5	0.03%
Nassau	253,163	49.58%	257,292	50.39%	131	0.03%
New York	364,747	82.84%	75,203	17.08%	374	0.0%
Niagara	32,266	43.34%	42,159	56.63%	15	0.02%
Oneida	31,351	42.33%	42,690	57.64%	20	0.03%
Onondaga	97,599	58.2%	70,048	41.77%	62	0.04%
Ontario	21,727	47.86%	23,658	52.11%	14	0.03%
Orange	59,009	48.69%	62,115	51.26%	63	0.05%
Orleans	3,912	29.49%	9,348	70.47%	6	0.05%
Oswego	14,759	37.28%	24,817	62.69%	10	0.03%
Otsego	9,980	46.01%	11,701	53.95%	8	0.04%
Putnam	17,353	42.7%	23,280	57.28%	9	0.02%
Queens	282,918	66.4%	142,821	33.52%	316	0.07%
Rensselaer	33,778	54.81%	27,823	45.15%	25	0.04%
Richmond	49,990	36.15%	88,205	63.79%	87	0.06%
Rockland	51,434	50.36%	50,592	49.53%	112	0.11%
St. Lawrence	15,299	45.76%	18,124	54.21%	8	0.02%
Saratoga	53,566	52.18%	49,070	47.8%	25	0.02%
Schenectady	31,052	58.0%	22,455	41.94%	30	0.06%
Schoharie	4,916	38.67%	7,792	61.3%	4	0.03%
Schuyler	3,007	39.33%	4,635	60.62%	4	0.05%
Seneca	5,162	54.58%	5,162	45.38%	4	0.04%
Steuben	11,142	32.77%	22,851	67.21%	8	0.02%
Suffolk	253,856	45.7%	301,564	54.29%	85	0.02%
Sullivan	10,757	44.89%	13,193	55.06%	11	0.05%
Tioga	6,872	36.7%	11,843	63.25%	8	0.04%
Tompkins	25,833	74.52%	8,814	25.43%	19	0.05%
Ulster	46,877	60.85%	30,123	39.1%	32	0.04%
Warren	13,840	50.04%	13,804	49.91%	13	0.05%
Washington	9,219	42.45%	12,489	57.51%	9	0.04%
Wayne	12,321	37.19%	20,801	62.78%	10	0.03%
Westchester	201,744	62.8%	119,436	37.18%	48	0.01%
Wyoming	4,114	27.38%	10,910	72.61%	2	0.01%
Yates	3,269	40.32%	4,833	59.61%	6	0.07%
Totals	3,305,112	57.27%	2,463,404	42.68%	2,880	0.05%

Counties that flipped from Democratic to Republican

- Chautauqua (largest municipality: Jamestown)
- Niagara (County Seat: Lockport)
- Ontario (largest municipality: Geneva)
- Cayuga (largest municipality: Auburn)
- Cortland (largest municipality: Cortland)
- Seneca (largest municipality: Seneca Falls)
- Oneida (largest municipality: Utica)
- Madison (largest municipality: Oneida)
- Otsego (largest municipality: Oneonta)
- Montgomery (largest municipality: Amsterdam)
- St. Lawrence (largest municipality: Massena)
- Orange (largest municipality: Kiryas Joel)
- Putnam (largest municipality: Lake Carmel)
- Sullivan (largest municipality: Monticello)
- Washington (largest municipality: Hudson Falls)
- Nassau (largest municipality: Hempstead)
- Richmond (Staten Island, borough of New York City)
- Suffolk (largest municipality: Brookhaven)

==== By congressional district ====
DiNapoli won 19 of 26 congressional districts, including four that elected Republicans.

District	DiNapoli	Rodriguez	Representative
1st	47%	53%	Lee Zeldin (117th Congress)
1st	47%	53%	Nick LaLota (118th Congress)
2nd	43%	56%	Andrew Garbarino
3rd	49%	51%	Tom Suozzi (117th Congress)
3rd	49%	51%	George Santos (118th Congress)
4th	51%	49%	Kathleen Rice (117th Congress)
4th	51%	49%	Anthony D'Esposito (118th Congress)
5th	75%	25%	Gregory Meeks
6th	59%	41%	Grace Meng
7th	79%	21%	Nydia Velázquez
8th	72%	28%	Hakeem Jeffries
9th	73%	27%	Yvette Clarke
10th	83%	17%	Jerry Nadler (117th Congress)
10th	83%	17%	Dan Goldman (118th Congress)
11th	39%	61%	Nicole Malliotakis
12th	81%	19%	Carolyn Maloney (117th Congress)
12th	81%	19%	Jerry Nadler (118th Congress)
13th	86%	14%	Adriano Espaillat
14th	72%	28%	Alexandria Ocasio-Cortez
15th	80%	20%	Ritchie Torres
16th	66%	34%	Jamaal Bowman
17th	52%	48%	Mondaire Jones (117th Congress)
17th	52%	48%	Mike Lawler (118th Congress)
18th	53%	47%	Sean Patrick Maloney (117th Congress)
18th	53%	47%	Pat Ryan (118th Congress)
19th	52%	48%	Pat Ryan (117th Congress)
19th	52%	48%	Marc Molinaro (118th Congress)
20th	60%	40%	Paul Tonko
21st	45%	55%	Elise Stefanik
22nd	52%	48%	Claudia Tenney (117th Congress)
22nd	52%	48%	Brandon Williams (118th Congress)
23rd	41%	59%	Joe Sempolinski (117th Congress)
23rd	41%	59%	Nick Langworthy (118th Congress)
24th	40%	60%	John Katko (117th Congress)
24th	40%	60%	Claudia Tenney (118th Congress)
25th	57%	43%	Joseph Morelle
26th	61%	39%	Brian Higgins
