= Thomas Laverne =

American politician (1917–1994)

Laverne, circa 1970

Thomas Laverne (March 7, 1917 – August 8, 1994) was an American lawyer and politician from New York.

== Life ==
He was born on March 7, 1917, in Rochester, New York. He graduated from the New York State College for Teachers in 1939, and then taught school. In 1942, he married Mary Saunders and they had four daughters. During World War II he served in the U.S. Army and was awarded the Combat Infantryman Badge. He graduated from Cornell Law School in 1948, and practiced law in Rochester. He lived in Irondequoit.

Laverne was a member of the New York State Senate from 1961 to 1972, sitting in the 173rd, 174th, 175th, 176th, 177th, 178th and 179th New York State Legislatures. In June 1972, after re-apportionment, he ran in the 53rd District for re-nomination, but was defeated in the Republican primary by Gordon J. DeHond. In September 1974, he defeated DeHond in the Republican primary for re-nomination. At the senate election in November, both Laverne and DeHond (running on the Conservative ticket) were defeated by Democrat John D. Perry.

Laverne died on August 8, 1994, in St. Mary's Hospital in Rochester, New York, of cancer.

== Sources ==
New York State Senate
| Preceded by A. Gould Hatch | New York State Senate; 52nd District; 1961–1965 | Succeeded by Tarky Lombardi, Jr. |
| Preceded by Bertrand H. Hoak | New York State Senate; 57th District; 1966 | Succeeded by James F. Hastings |
| Preceded by Hugh Douglas Barclay | New York State Senate; 50th District; 1967–1972 | Succeeded by Tarky Lombardi, Jr. |
