= John Mannion (American politician) =

American politician (born 1968)

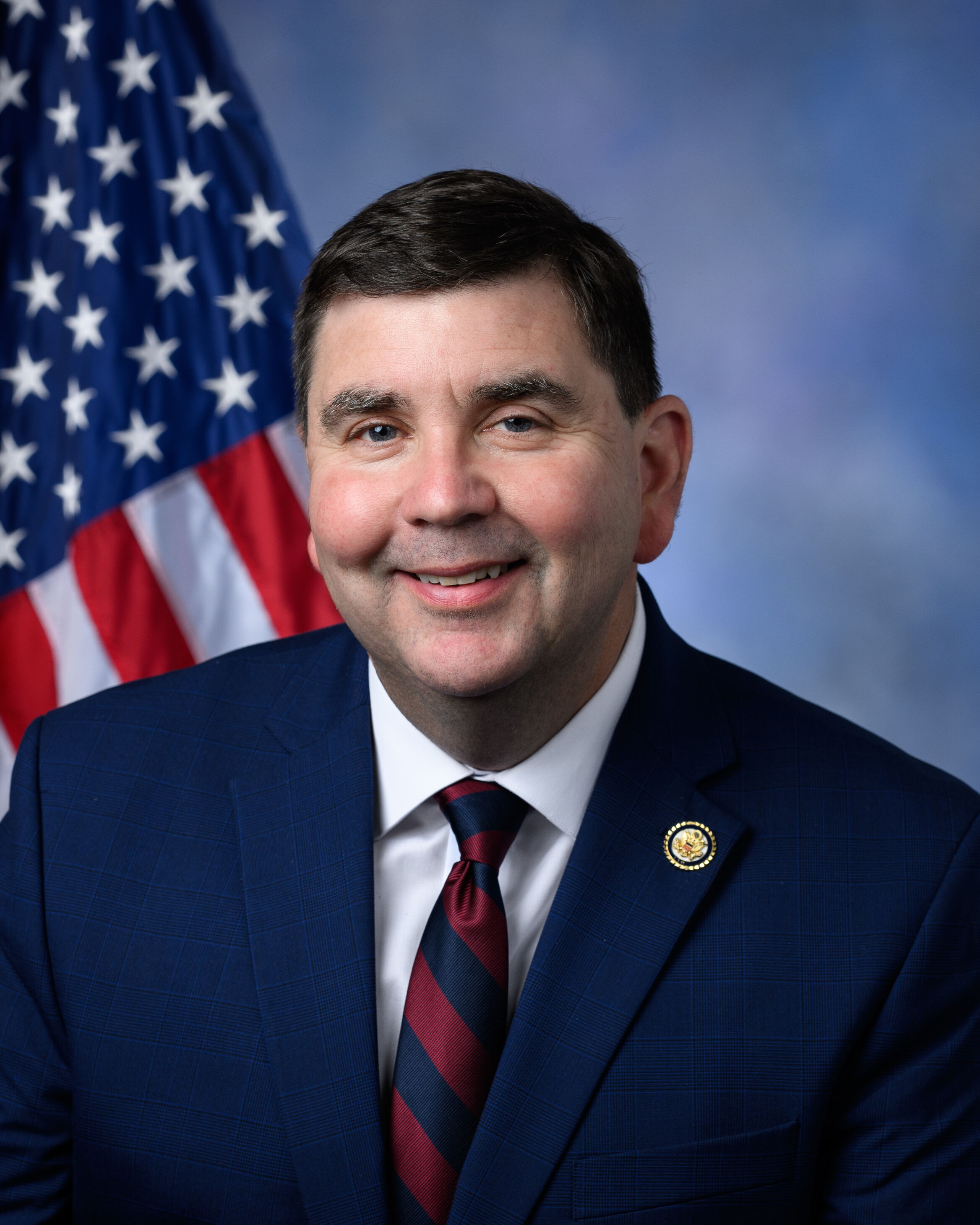
- Official portrait, 2025

Member of the U.S. House of Representatives from New York's 22nd district
- Incumbent
- Assumed office January 3, 2025
- Preceded by: Brandon Williams

Member of the New York State Senate from the 50th district
- In office December 16, 2020 – December 31, 2024
- Preceded by: Bob Antonacci
- Succeeded by: Chris Ryan

Personal details
- Born: July 8, 1968 (age 58) Syracuse, New York, U.S.
- Party: Democratic
- Spouse: Jennifer Brady (m. 1997)
- Children: 3
- Education: Binghamton University (BS); State University of New York, Oswego (MS)
- Website: House website Campaign website
- Mannion's voice Mannion on the passage of the 21st Century ROAD to Housing Act; Recorded June 25, 2026

John W. Mannion (born July 8, 1968) is an American educator and politician who has served as the U.S. representative from New York's 22nd congressional district since 2025. He previously served as a state senator from the 50th district between 2020 and 2024. Before entering politics, Mannion was a high school biology teacher.

Mannion was elected in 2020 to the New York State Senate, defeating Republican Angi Renna and became the first Democrat to hold the seat in more than 50 years. He then won the 2024 U.S. House election against incumbent Brandon Williams.

== Early life and education ==
Mannion was born and raised in Syracuse, New York, and is the grandson of Irish immigrants. His mother worked for New York Telephone and his father was employed by New York Central Railroad.

Mannion attended Bishop Ludden High School and later graduated from Binghamton University with a bachelor of science's degree in biology. He went on to earn a Master of Science in secondary science education from SUNY Oswego.

== Teaching career ==
After completing his studies, Mannion became a high school biology teacher. He taught in the West Genesee Central School District, where he also served as president of the West Genesee Teachers' Association. Before this he taught at Nottingham High School and Christian Brothers Academy.

== New York State Senate ==
In 2018, Mannion ran for the New York State Senate in the 50th district but narrowly lost to the incumbent, Republican Bob Antonacci. He ran again in 2020 and won the seat with 52.57% of the vote, defeating Republican Angi Renna.

Mannion's 2022 re-election campaign was closely contested. On election night, Republican candidate Rebecca Shiroff led by 396 votes before absentee ballots were counted. A recount ultimately declared Mannion the winner, with a margin of 10 votes, making it the closest race in the 2022 New York State Senate elections.

In 2023, Mannion announced his candidacy for New York's 22nd congressional district in the 2024 election, choosing not to seek re-election to the Senate. In June 2024, three former staffers accused Mannion and his wife of creating a hostile work environment. After an investigation, he was cleared of any wrongdoing.

=== Committee assignments ===
Mannion was the chairperson of the Committee on Disabilities. He also served as a member of the following committees:

- The Committee on Children and Families
- The Committee on Civil Service and Pensions
- The Committee on Education
- The Committee on Environmental Conservation
- The Committee on Housing, Construction and Community Development
- The Committee on Internet and Technology

== U.S. House of Representatives ==
=== Elections ===
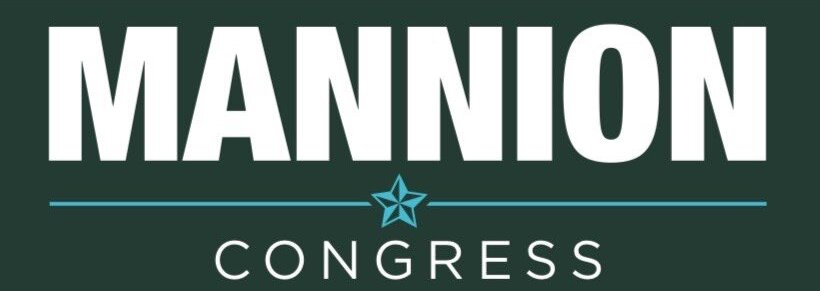
Mannion's congressional campaign logo

Mannion won the 2024 Democratic primary for the U.S. House of Representatives in New York's 22nd congressional district. He defeated Sarah Klee Hood and went on to face incumbent Republican Representative Brandon Williams.

=== Tenure ===
In August 2026, in a letter to Treasury Secretary Scott Bessent, Mannion requested resuming efforts in placing Harriet Tubman on the twenty-dollar-bill. He also voted for an amendment by Thomas Massie to a State Department appropriations bill to eliminate all regularly appropriated US aid to Israel.

=== Committee assignments ===
For the 119th Congress:

- Committee on Agriculture
  - Subcommittee on Conservation, Research, and Biotechnology
  - Subcommittee on Commodity Markets, Digital Assets, and Rural Development
- Committee on Education and Workforce
  - Subcommittee on Early Childhood, Elementary, and Secondary Education
  - Subcommittee on Health, Employment, Labor, and Pensions

=== Caucus membership ===
- Congressional Equality Caucus
- New Democrat Coalition
- Labor Caucus

== Personal life ==
Mannion is married to his wife, Jennifer. They have three children.

== Electoral history ==
=== 2018 ===
2018 New York State Senate election, District 50
Party	Candidate	Votes	%
Republican	Bob Antonacci (incumbent)	62,330	50.92
Democratic	John Mannion	59,998	49.02
Write-in		75	0.06
Total votes		157,828	100.00
Republican hold			

=== 2020 ===
2020 New York State Senate election, District 50
Party	Candidate	Votes	%
Democratic	John Mannion	77,293	48.97
Working Families	John Mannion	5,889	3.73
Total	John Mannion	83,182	52.70
Republican	Angi Renna	62,929	39.87
Conservative	Angi Renna	9,806	6.21
Independence	Angi Renna	2,308	1.62
Total	Angi Renna	75,043	47.30
Total votes		157,828	100.00
Democratic gain from Republican			

=== 2022 ===
2022 New York State Senate election, District 50
Party	Candidate	Votes	%
Democratic	John Mannion (incumbent)	61,579	50.004
Republican	Rebecca Shiroff	61,569	49.996
Total votes		123,148	100.00
Democratic hold			

=== 2024 ===
2024 United States House of Representatives election in New York, District 22
Party	Candidate	Votes	%
Democratic	John Mannion	16,624	61.6
Democratic	Sarah Klee Hood	10,373	38.4
Total votes		26,997	100.0

2024 United States House of Representatives elections in New York, District 22
Party	Candidate	Votes	%
Democratic	John Mannion	194,450	54.6
Republican	Brandon Williams (incumbent)	161,939	45.4
Total votes		356,389	100.0
Democratic gain from Republican			

U.S. House of Representatives
Preceded by Brandon Williams	Member of the U.S. House of Representatives from New York's 22nd congressional district 2025–present	Incumbent
U.S. order of precedence (ceremonial)
Preceded by Ryan Mackenzie	United States representatives by seniority 398th	Succeeded by Sarah McBride
