= Thomas Sanzillo =

American politician

New York State Comptroller Acting
- In office December 22, 2006 – February 7, 2007
- Preceded by: Alan Hevesi
- Succeeded by: Thomas DiNapoli

Personal details
- Born: June 21, 1955 (age 71) Brooklyn, New York, U.S.
- Party: Democratic

Thomas Sanzillo (born June 21, 1955) is an American investment banker, financial advisor and politician.

Sanzillo is the director of finance for the Institute for Energy Economics and Financial Analysis, and author of several studies on coal plants, rate impacts, credit analyses, and public and private financial structures for the energy industry.

Sanzillo began working in the comptroller's office in 1994, and was appointed first deputy comptroller by Alan Hevesi in 2003. After Hevesi's resignation, Sanzillo became acting New York State Comptroller from December 22, 2006, to February 7, 2007.

Sanzillo served as acting comptroller until Thomas DiNapoli was elected by the New York State Legislature. DiNapoli reappointed Sanzillo as first deputy comptroller on March 7, 2007. On July 26, 2007, Sanzillo resigned as from the position, and is now the director of financial analysis at the Institute for Energy Economics and Financial Analysis. Sanzillo retired from the Institute on January 1, 2025.

Political offices
Preceded by Alan Hevesi	New York State Comptroller; Acting; 2006–2007	Succeeded by Thomas DiNapoli
