= Tom DiNapoli =

American politician (born 1954)

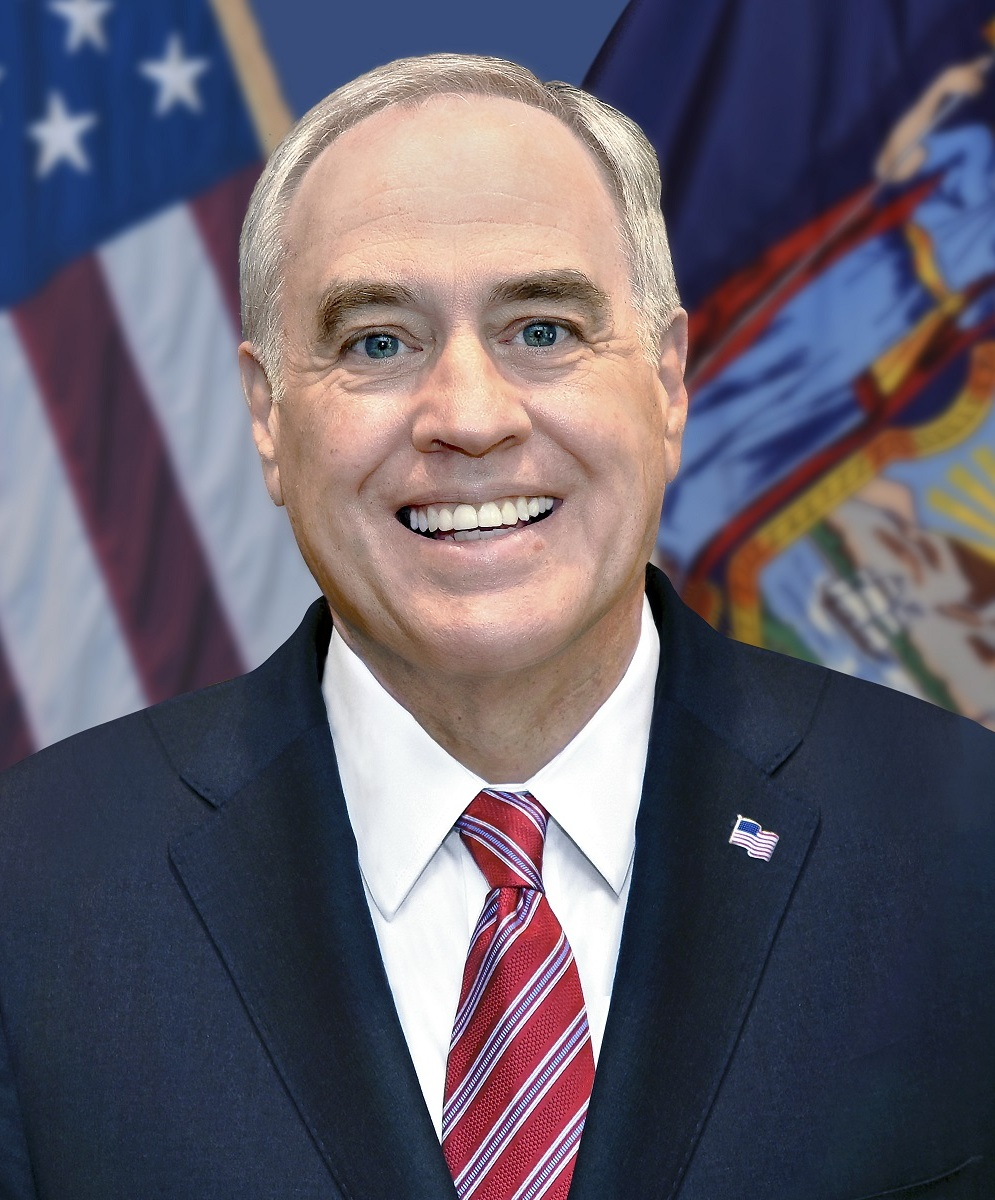
- Official portrait, 2020

54th Comptroller of New York
- Incumbent
- Assumed office February 7, 2007
- Governor: Eliot Spitzer; David Paterson; Andrew Cuomo; Kathy Hochul
- Preceded by: Thomas Sanzillo (acting)

Member of the New York State Assembly from the 16th district
- In office January 1, 1987 – February 7, 2007
- Preceded by: May W. Newburger
- Succeeded by: Michelle Schimel

Personal details
- Born: Thomas Peter DiNapoli; February 10, 1954 (age 72) Rockville Centre, New York, U.S.
- Party: Democratic
- Education: Hofstra University (BA); The New School (MA)
- Website: Office website Campaign website

Thomas Peter DiNapoli (born February 10, 1954) is an American politician serving as the 54th and current New York State Comptroller. He has served as comptroller since 2007 and as of 2026, is the second longest-serving comptroller in New York history.

A member of the Democratic Party, he was elected by a bipartisan majority of the New York State Legislature to the position of comptroller on February 7, 2007. He was then elected comptroller by New York's voters in 2010, 2014, 2018, 2022 and 2026. In his 2014 and 2018 re-election victories, he received more votes than any other candidates for statewide office.

DiNapoli previously served as a New York State Assemblymember for the 16th district in northwestern Nassau County, first elected in 1986. He served 20 years in the Assembly. During his tenure, he chaired the Environmental Conservation Committee, the Local Governments Committee, and the Governmental Operations Committee.

== Early life and education ==
DiNapoli was born to Nicholas Peter DiNapoli and Adeline (Abbondandelo) DiNapoli and he was named after his paternal grandfather Thomas Peter DiNapoli. Both of his parents were the children of immigrants. His father, Nick, served in World War II, and after the war worked as a cable splicer for New York Telephone. For a time he was a shop steward for his union, the Communications Workers of America. DiNapoli's mother, Adeline, was a records clerk for the county police department.

Raised in Albertson on Long Island, DiNapoli has been active in politics since he was a teenager, when he ran for and won a position as a trustee on the Mineola Board of Education. At the age of 18 in 1972, he was the youngest person in New York State history elected to public office. He served on the school board for 10 years.

In 1976, DiNapoli graduated magna cum laude from Hofstra University with a bachelor's degree in history. After college he worked for New York Telephone and AT&T. In 1988, he received a master's degree in human resources management from The New School University's Graduate School of Management and Urban Professions.

== Early political career ==
DiNapoli worked as an aide for Assemblyman Angelo F. Orazio. He also served as a district representative for Congressman Robert J. Mrazek. DiNapoli was a member of the New York State Assembly from 1987 to 2007, sitting in the 187th, 188th, 189th, 190th, 191st, 192nd, 193rd, 194th, 195th, 196th and 197th New York state legislatures. He represented the 16th district, located in Northwest Nassau County. DiNapoli was later also elected as Chairman of the Nassau County Democratic Committee. In 2001, he lost the Democratic nomination for Nassau County Executive to Tom Suozzi, who later won the election. In 2006, DiNapoli was a candidate for lieutenant governor, but dropped out of the race after Attorney General Eliot Spitzer, the party's frontrunner for governor, chose Senate Minority Leader David Paterson as his running mate.

== New York State Comptroller ==
=== 2007 election by legislature ===
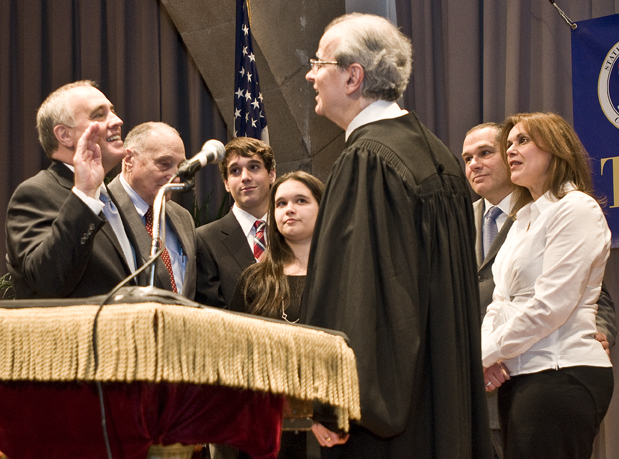
DiNapoli's inauguration as New York State Comptroller, January 11, 2011

New York State Comptroller Alan Hevesi resigned his post in December 2006 and pleaded guilty to a fraud charge. On February 7, 2007, in a joint session of the New York State Legislature, DiNapoli was elected to serve the remainder of Hevesi's unexpired term as comptroller. The vote was 150–56.

=== Elections ===
==== 2010 ====
DiNapoli ran for election in November 2010. On May 1, 2010, he won the Democratic Rural Conference's Straw Poll by acclamation. On May 26, 2010, DiNapoli received the designation of the New York Democratic Party. "I'm grateful for your support and I salute your commitment to moving our great state forward. It's a commitment I share with each of you," said DiNapoli on the occasion. He received the nomination of the Working Families Party for comptroller.

In November 2010, DiNapoli narrowly won the general election. DiNapoli claimed victory early the morning of November 3, and Republican challenger Harry Wilson conceded later in the morning.

==== 2014 ====
DiNapoli ran for reelection in November 2014. On May 21, 2014, he received the nomination of the New York Democratic Party. "This office has an important compelling and independent role to play in moving our state forward. As New York State Comptroller, I'll continue to go to work every day striving to do right by New Yorkers," said DiNapoli at the Democratic Convention. He also received the nomination of the Independence, Working Families and Women's Equality parties for State Comptroller.

In November 2014, he won reelection, defeating Republican candidate Bob Antonacci. DiNapoli received the most votes of any statewide candidate with 2,077,293 votes.

==== 2018 ====
DiNapoli ran for reelection for a third full term. On May 23, 2018, he received the nomination of the New York Democratic Party. "This office has a lot more work to do for a safer, fairer New York. As New York State Comptroller, I'll continue to go to work every day striving to do right by New Yorkers," said DiNapoli at the Democratic Convention. He also received the nomination of the Independence, Working Families and Women's Equality and Reform parties for State Comptroller.

In November 2018, he won reelection, defeating Republican candidate Jonathan Trichter, a former Democrat who switched to the GOP. DiNapoli once again received the most votes of any statewide candidate with 4,027,886 votes.

==== 2022 ====
DiNapoli won reelection to a fourth term. He ran unopposed in the primary.

==== 2026 ====
On February 6, 2026, DiNapoli received the Democratic nomination for comptroller in the 2026 election.

=== Tenure ===
In lieu of a transition committee, DiNapoli established a commission to review the Comptroller's office. The commission was headed by former Mayor of New York Ed Koch and financial expert Frank Zarb. Also included in this commission were Nassau County Executive Tom Suozzi, Chancellor of Syracuse University Nancy Cantor, and New York City Comptroller William Thompson. In March 2007, as one of DiNapoli's first public statements as Comptroller, he warned then-Governor Eliot Spitzer that his proposed budget had levels of spending were at an "unsustainable rate". DiNapoli stated that, at the rate proposed by Spitzer's budget, there would be a $13 billion deficit in three years' time.

As Comptroller, DiNapoli makes periodic, public reports on a variety of issues affecting state, local, and charitable agencies. In March 2010, he reported that nonprofits had been hurt by the recession as well as by delays in state contracts. The following month, he gained a reputation as a critic of the State's budget deficit. He "has proposed major reforms in the state budget process". He unveiled a package of proposed reforms to the budget process in March 2010. Key parts of his plans are for "governors to identify plans to erase budget deficits in future years", to cap state debt, and to require excess surplusses to be deposited into the "rainy day fund". DiNapoli supported increasing New York pension fund investments into Israel Bonds, totaling $332.5 million as of 2026.

== Personal life ==
DiNapoli is single and has no children. He lives in Great Neck Plaza, New York.

On September 1, 2013, DiNapoli was awarded honorary citizenship in the small town of Paduli in the province of Benevento, Italy. Paduli is the birthplace of his paternal grandfather. DiNapoli has received honorary degrees from Hofstra University and Ulster University.

== Electoral history ==
New York State Assembly 16th District Election, 1998
Party	Candidate	Votes	%
Democratic*	Thomas DiNapoli (inc.)	26,806	67.30
Republican*	Thomas Zampino	13,027	32.70

*DiNapoli also appeared on the Independence Party and Liberal Party lines; Zampino also appeared on the Conservative Party line.

New York State Assembly 16th District Election, 2000
Party	Candidate	Votes	%
Democratic*	Thomas DiNapoli (inc.)	35,621	70.29
Republican*	Jerome Galluscio	15,053	29.71

*DiNapoli also appeared on the Independence Party, Liberal Party, and Working Families Party lines; Galluscio also appeared on the Conservative Party and Right to Life Party lines.

New York State Assembly 16th District Election, 2002
Party	Candidate	Votes	%
Democratic*	Thomas DiNapoli (inc.)	25,301	67.62
Republican	Javier Vargas	10,527	28.13
Conservative	Frank Russo Jr.	1,590	4.25

*DiNapoli also appeared on the Independence Party, Liberal Party, and Working Families Party lines.

New York State Assembly 16th District Election, 2004
Party	Candidate	Votes	%
Democratic*	Thomas DiNapoli (inc.)	40,179	69.31
Republican*	Michael McGillicuddy	17,791	30.69

*DiNapoli also appeared on the Independence Party, Liberal Party, and Working Families Party lines; McGillicuddy also appeared on the Conservative Party line.

New York Comptroller Election, 2010
Party	Candidate	Votes	%
Democratic*	Thomas DiNapoli	2,271,666	50.78
Republican*	Harry Wilson	2,069,427	46.26
Green	Julia Willebrand	104,445	2.33
Libertarian	John Gaetani	27,882	0.62

*DiNapoli also appeared on the Working Families Party line; Wilson also appeared on the Independence Party and Conservative Party lines.

New York Comptroller Election, 2014
Party	Candidate	Votes	%
Democratic*	Thomas DiNapoli (inc.)	2,233,057	60.15
Republican*	Robert Antonacci	1,354,643	36.49
Green	Theresa Portelli	97,906	2.64
Libertarian	John Clifton	26,583	0.72

*DiNapoli also appeared on the Working Families Party, Independence Party, and Women's Equality Party lines; Antonacci also appeared on the Conservative Party and Stop Common Core Party lines.

New York Comptroller Election, 2018
Party	Candidate	Votes	%
Democratic*	Thomas DiNapoli (inc.)	4,027,886	66.96
Republican*	Jonathan Trichter	1,882,958	31.30
Green	Mark Dunlea	70,041	1.16
Libertarian	Cruger E. Gallaudet	34,430	0.57

*DiNapoli also appeared on the Working Families Party, Independence Party, Women's Equality Party, and Reform Party lines; Trichter also appeared on the Conservative Party line.

New York Comptroller Election, 2022
Party	Candidate	Votes	%
Democratic*	Thomas DiNapoli (inc.)	3,305,112	57.29
Republican*	Paul Rodriguez	2,463,404	42.71

*DiNapoli also appeared on the Working Families Party line; Rodriguez also appeared on the Conservative Party line.

Party political offices
Preceded by Alan Hevesi	Democratic nominee for Comptroller of New York; 2010, 2014, 2018, 2022, 2026	Most recent
Political offices
Preceded by Thomas Sanzillo; Acting	Comptroller of New York; 2007–present	Incumbent
