= Bertrand H. Hoak =

American politician (1917–1987)

Member of the New York State Senate from the 64th district
- In office January 1, 1966 – December 31, 1966
- Preceded by: New district
- Succeeded by: District abolished

Member of the New York State Senate from the 57th district
- In office January 1, 1965 – December 31, 1965
- Preceded by: Richard T. Cooke
- Succeeded by: Thomas Laverne

Personal details
- Born: January 29, 1917 Buffalo, New York, U.S.
- Died: October 19, 1987 (aged 70) Buffalo, New York, U.S.
- Party: Democratic
- Spouse: Nora Theresa Beasley (m. 1949)
- Children: 5
- Occupation: Politician, businessman

Bertrand H. Hoak (January 29, 1917 – October 19, 1987) was an American businessman and politician from New York.

== Life ==
He was born on January 29, 1917, in Buffalo, New York, the son of Augustus F. Hoak (1887–1974) and Rose M. (Hoehn) Hoak (1889–1975). He attended Mt. St. Joseph's Grammar School and Buffalo East High School. In 1949, he married Nora Theresa Beasley (1920–2007), and they had five children. They ran Hoak's Lakeshore Restaurant in Hamburg, New York, and later also Hoak's Armor Inn in Hamburg. Hoak was chosen President of the Innkeepers Association of Western New York in 1961.

Hoak was a member of the New York State Senate in 1965 and 1966, and was Chairman of the Committee on Affairs of Villages in 1965. In June 1966, after re-apportionment, he ran in the 56th District for re-nomination, but was defeated in the Democratic primary by James D. Griffin. In November 1966, Hoak ran on the Liberal ticket for re-election, but was again defeated by Griffin. The election was heavily impacted by Bert Hoak's endorsement of Medicare.

He died on October 19, 1987, in Veterans Hospital in Buffalo, New York.

"The Innkeepers Association of Western New York's Bertrand H. Hoak Memorial Scholarship Award" was created in his honor at Erie Community College's Culinary Arts division.

== Sources ==
New York State Senate
Preceded by Richard T. Cooke	New York State Senate; 57th District; 1965	Succeeded by Thomas Laverne
Preceded by new district	New York State Senate; 64th District; 1966	Succeeded by district abolished
