= Bob Antonacci =

American politician and judge

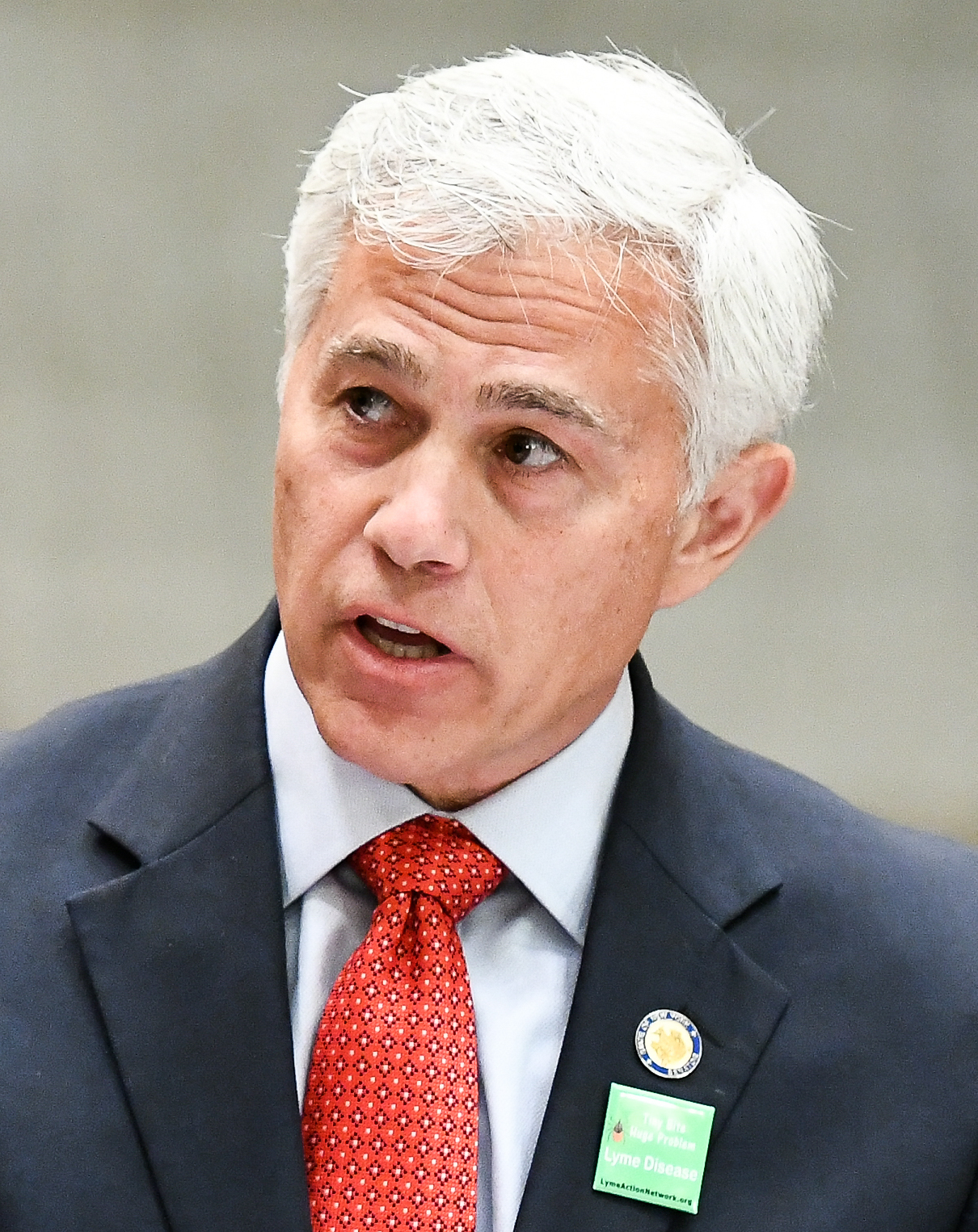
- Antonacci in 2019

Justice of the New York State Supreme Court from the 5th Judicial district
- Incumbent
- Assumed office January 1, 2020
- Preceded by: James C. Tormey, III

Member of the New York State Senate from the 50th district
- In office January 1, 2019 – December 31, 2019
- Preceded by: John DeFrancisco
- Succeeded by: John Mannion

Comptroller of Onondaga County
- In office 2008–2018
- Preceded by: Donald F. Colon
- Succeeded by: Matt Beadnell

Personal details
- Born: Syracuse, New York, U.S.
- Party: Republican Party (after 2007)
- Other political affiliations: Democratic Party (until 2007)
- Education: Le Moyne College (BA); Syracuse University (JD)

Robert E. Antonacci is an American politician and judge from Syracuse, New York. A Republican, Antonacci served as Onondaga County Comptroller from 2008 to 2018. He was the Republican nominee for New York State Comptroller in 2014, losing to incumbent Democrat Tom DiNapoli. He was elected to the New York State Senate in New York's 50th State Senate district in 2018. In 2019, Antonacci was elected as a Justice of the New York Supreme Court—a trial-level court—in the Fifth Judicial District and stepped down from his Senate seat.

== Early life and education ==
Antonacci was born and raised in Syracuse, New York, and graduated from Le Moyne College. Following graduation, he worked with Ernst & Young as a Certified Public Accountant. He is married with two children.

Following his time as a CPA, Antonacci attended Syracuse University School of Law, graduating cum laude, and later entered into a private law practice.

== Career ==
=== Onondaga County Comptroller ===
In 2003, Antonacci ran for comptroller of Onondaga County as a Democrat, but lost to incumbent Republican Donald F. Colon. However, in 2007, Antonacci was elected to the post as a Republican. After taking office in 2008, he won reelection in 2011 and again in 2015. Antonacci resigned his post after being elected to the New York State Senate in 2018.

=== Campaigns for New York State Comptroller ===
Antonacci unsuccessfully sought the Republican nomination for New York State Comptroller in 2010. Four years later, after no other candidates came forward, he accepted the Republican nomination for the 2014 New York Comptroller election, anticipating that he would receive matching funds for his campaign. He failed to raise enough money to qualify for matching funds under the state's pilot program and lost to incumbent Thomas DiNapoli.

=== New York State Senate ===
In 2018, longtime Republican Senator John DeFrancisco announced that he would not seek re-election in Senate District 50. DeFrancisco's decision left the District 50 seat open for the first time since 1992. Soon after, Antonnaci declared his candidacy for the seat. Democrats targeted the district as a prime pickup opportunity, lining up behind the candidacy of public school teacher John Mannion. Although Democrats won control of the New York State Senate in 2018, Antonacci won his election; he defeated Mannion by a margin of 51% to 49%. He was sworn in on December 29, 2018.

Antonacci stepped down from his State Senate seat on December 31, 2019 after being elected to the New York State Supreme Court.

=== Justice of the New York State Supreme Court ===
Less than a year into his State Senate term, Antonacci accepted nominations to run for a seat on the New York State Supreme Court, Fifth Judicial District. Antonacci sought the judgeship vacated upon the June 2019 death of James Tormey III, one of Antonacci's prominent mentors. In November 2019, Antonacci was elected to the New York State Supreme Court. He participated in a swearing-in ceremony on December 30, 2019.

== See also ==
- List of New York state senators

Party political offices
Preceded by Harry Wilson	Republican nominee for New York State Comptroller; 2014	Succeeded by Jonathan Trichter
