= Institute for Energy Economics and Financial Analysis =

Think tank

- Abbreviation: IEEFA
- Formation: 2012; 14 years ago
- Founder: A group of energy and finance experts, including Tom Sanzillo
- Type: Nonprofit
- Legal status: 501(c)(3)
- Purpose: Accelerate the transition to a sustainable, and profitable energy economy
- Location: Lakewood, Ohio, United States
- Region served: Worldwide
- Services: Study financial and economic impact of energy and the environment
- Official language: English
- Chief Executive Officer: Sandy Buchanan
- Website: ieefa.org

The Institute for Energy Economics and Financial Analysis (IEEFA) is a United States-based nonprofit organization that produces research and analysis relating to energy markets, the fossil fuel sector, and the transition to cleaner energy.

Its reports are used by many news organisations.

== History ==
The institute was founded in 2012 by energy and finance professionals including Tom Sanzillo, who was the New York State Comptroller. The initial focus was on the economic risks of coal investments and utility financial sustainability.

In 2013 the institute published one of the first critical financial reports on Peabody Energy, highlighting long-term decline of coal demand. It went on to publish a number of critical reports on coal development in China and India and the risk of climate risk to pension funds. By 2017 it was reporting on renewable energy growth in South East Asia.

In 2024, IEEFA research was cited in COP28 by institutions like the International Energy Agency, World Bank, and Asian Development Bank.
