= 2010 New York State Comptroller election =

2010 New York Comptroller election
- November 2, 2010
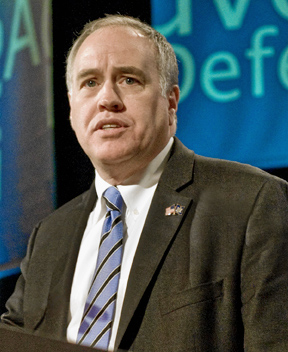

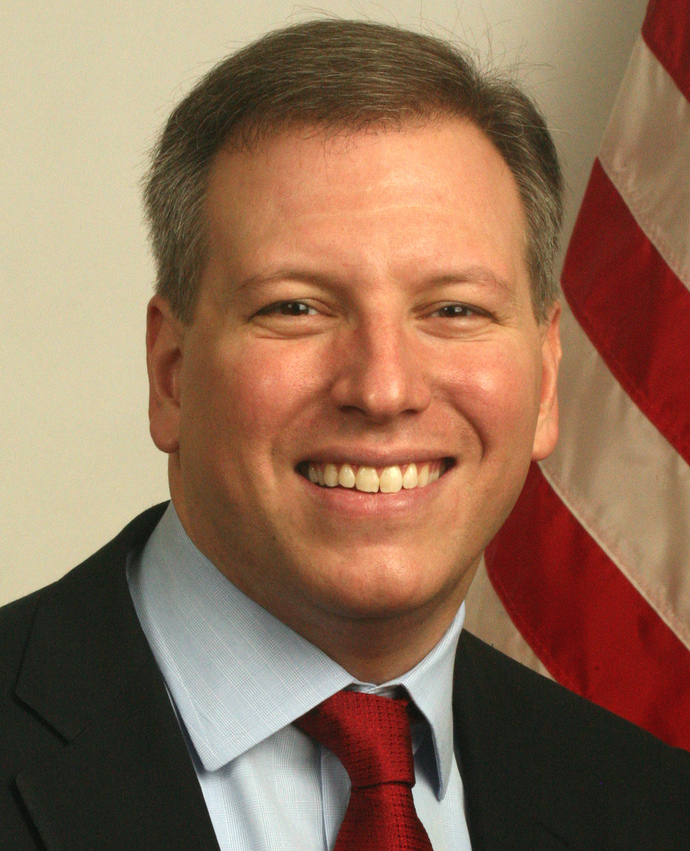
| Nominee | Thomas DiNapoli | Harry Wilson |
| Party | Democratic | Republican |
| Alliance | Working Families | Conservative |
| Popular vote | 2,272,805 | 2,070,349 |
| Percentage | 50.77% | 46.25% |
- County results DiNapoli: 40–50% 50–60% 60–70% 70–80% 80–90% Wilson: 40–50% 50–60% 60–70% 70–80%
Comptroller before election
Thomas DiNapoli
Democratic
Elected Comptroller
Thomas DiNapoli
Democratic

The 2010 New York comptroller election was held on November 2, 2010, to elect the state comptroller of New York. Democratic appointee Thomas DiNapoli won election to his first term, defeating Republican businessman Harry Wilson.

DiNapoli was appointed as comptroller by a joint session of the New York State Legislature on February 7, 2007.

== Democratic primary ==
=== Candidates ===
==== Nominee ====
Thomas DiNapoli, incumbent state comptroller (2007–present)

=== Polling ===
Hypothetical polling

| Poll source | Date(s) administered | Sample size (Note: Key: A – all adults RV – registered voters LV – likely voters V – unclear) | Margin of error | Thomas DiNapoli | Eliot Spitzer | Undecided |
|---|---|---|---|---|---|---|
| Marist Poll | September 8–10, 2009 | 354 (RV) | ± 5.5% | 49% | 37% | 14% |

== Republican primary ==
=== Candidates ===
==== Nominee ====
- Harry Wilson

== Other Parties ==
=== Green Party ===
- Julia Willebrand

=== Libertarian Party ===
- John Gaetani

== General election ==
=== Polling ===
| Poll Source | Dates administered | Tom DiNapoli (D) | Harry Wilson (R) | Undecided |
|---|---|---|---|---|
| NY GOP | April 12, 2010 | 22% | 25% | 48% |
| Marist Poll | June 5, 2010 | 42% | 47% | 11% |
| Marist Poll | July 17, 2010 | 22% | 48% | 1% |
| Marist Poll | August 1–4, 2010 | 42% | 48% | 7% |
| Marist Poll | September 19, 2010 | 45% | 45% | 7% |
| Marist Poll | October 7, 2010 | 32% | 49% | 1% |
| Marist Poll | October 12, 2010 | 32% | 35% | 41% |
| Marist Poll | October 19, 2010 | 49% | 34% | 1% |
| NY Post | October 22, 2010 | 39% | 45% | 4% |
| Marist Poll | October 27, 2010 | 42% | 41% | 1% |
| Marist Poll | November 1, 2010 | 45% | 45% | 7% |

=== Results ===
General election results
| Party | Candidate | Votes | % |
|---|---|---|---|
| Democratic | Thomas P. DiNapoli | 2,088,746 | 46.66% |
| Working Families | Thomas P. DiNapoli | 182,920 | 4.09% |
| Total | Thomas P. DiNapoli (incumbent) | 2,272,805 | 50.77% |
| Republican | Harry Wilson | 1,673,706 | 37.39% |
| Conservative | Harry Wilson | 243,419 | 5.44% |
| Independence | Harry Wilson | 152,302 | 3.40% |
| Total | Harry Wilson | 2,070,349 | 46.25% |
| Green | Julia Willebrand | 104,482 | 2.33% |
| Libertarian | John Gaetani | 27,898 | 0.62% |
| Write-in | | 921 | 0.02% |
| Total votes | | 4,476,455 | 100.00% |
| Democratic hold | | | |

== Notes ==
| Preceded by 2006 | New York Comptroller election 2010 | Succeeded by 2014 |
