= Brian Jones (activist) =

Brian P. Jones is an American educator, scholar, activist, and actor. He is the author of Black History Is for Everyone, recipient of the George Orwell Award for Distinguished Contribution to Honesty and Clarity in Public Language from the National Council of Teachers of English in 2026. Brian served as the inaugural director of the Center for Educators and Schools of The New York Public Library, and as the associate director of Education at the Schomburg Center for Research in Black Culture, where he was also a scholar in residence. Jones earned a PhD in Urban Education from the CUNY Graduate Center and has contributed to several books on issues of racism, inequality, and Black education history, including Black Lives Matter At School: An Uprising for Educational Justice. His first book, The Tuskegee Student Uprising: A History, won the 2023 Nonfiction Literary Award from the Black Caucus of the American Library Association.

Jones is a long-time member of the board of directors of Voices of a People's History of the United States, founded by Anthony Arnove and Howard Zinn to organize and promote public performances of primary texts from activists in American history. In addition to his role as a director, Jones also often serves as an educator and as a performer. Jones' collaboration with Arnove and Zinn dates back to his nationwide of tour of Zinn's one-man play Marx in Soho, in which Jones played the title role. He has also lent his voice to other projects, such as The Flores Exhibits (a series of short videos amplifying the voices of children held in detention facilities at the U.S. / Mexico Border) and he has narrated more than twenty audiobooks, including Hegemony or Survival, Detroit, I Do Mind Dying, and Marx in Soho.

A teacher of elementary grades in the New York City Public Schools for 9 years, Jones has been a prominent advocate for public education. He co-narrated the independent film The Inconvenient Truth Behind Waiting for Superman, which challenged the ideas of the 2010 documentary Waiting for "Superman".

In 2014, Jones ran for Lieutenant Governor of New York alongside Howie Hawkins on the Green Party of New York ticket. They received 184,419 votes (4.86%), which was more than enough for the party to retain statewide recognition. Jones was a member of the International Socialist Organization, which dissolved in early 2019. In 2025 he was tapped by incoming New York City Mayor Zohran Mamdani to serve on his transition subcommittee for Youth & Education.

Jones has published in a wide variety of media including The New York Times, The Guardian, Hammer & Hope, Jacobin, and Chalkbeat. He is married to theatre, television, and film actor Susan Pourfar.
