= New York's 50th State Senate district =

American legislative district

Senator
Chris Ryan; D–Syracuse
- Registration: 33.4% Democratic; 32.0% Republican; 26.3% No party preference
- Demographics: 85% White; 5% Black; 3% Hispanic; 4% Asian
- Population (2022): 317,782
- Registered voters: 224,449

New York's 50th State Senate district is one of 63 districts in the New York State Senate. It has been represented by Democrat Chris Ryan since 2025. It was previously represented by John Mannion since 2021, succeeding Republican Bob Antonacci, who was elected as a justice of the New York Supreme Court.

== Geography ==
District 50, centered on the suburbs of Syracuse, covers parts of Onondaga County and Oswego County in Central New York.

The district is located within New York's 22nd and 24th congressional districts, and overlaps with the 120th, 126th, 127th, 128th, 129th, and 130th districts of the New York State Assembly.

== Recent election results ==
=== 2026 ===
2026 New York State Senate election, District 50
Party	Candidate	Votes	%
Democratic	Chris Ryan		
Working Families	Chris Ryan		
Total	Chris Ryan (incumbent)		
Republican	James Corl		
Conservative	James Corl		
Total	James Corl		
Write-in			
Total votes			

=== 2024 ===
2024 New York State Senate election, District 50
Primary election
Party	Candidate	Votes	%
Democratic	Chris Ryan	6,026	58.3
Democratic	Thomas Drumm	4,275	41.4
Write-in		27	0.3
Total votes		10,328	100.0
General election
Democratic	Chris Ryan	75,307	
Working Families	Chris Ryan	6,366	
Total	Chris Ryan	81,673	50.4
Republican	Nick Paro	70,277	
Conservative	Nick Paro	9,886	
Total	Nick Paro	80,163	49.5
Write-in		114	0.1
Total votes		161,950	100.0
Democratic hold			

=== 2022 ===
2022 New York State Senate election, District 50
Party	Candidate	Votes	%
Democratic	John Mannion	57,712	
Working Families	John Mannion	3,867	
Total	John Mannion (incumbent)	61,579	49.992
Republican	Rebecca Shiroff	52,570	
Conservative	Rebecca Shiroff	8,999	
Total	Rebecca Shiroff	61,569	49.983
Write-in		30	0.03
Total votes		123,178	100.0
Democratic hold			

=== 2020 ===
2020 New York State Senate election, District 50
Party	Candidate	Votes	%
Democratic	John Mannion	77,293	
Working Families	John Mannion	5,889	
Total	John Mannion	83,182	52.6
Republican	Angi Renna	62,929	
Conservative	Angi Renna	9,806	
Independence	Angi Renna	2,308	
Total	Angi Renna	75,043	47.4
Write-in		46	0.0
Total votes		158,271	100.0
Democratic gain from Republican			

=== 2018 ===
2018 New York State Senate election, District 50
Party	Candidate	Votes	%
Republican	Bob Antonacci	50,970	
Conservative	Bob Antonacci	8,132	
Independence	Bob Antonacci	2,881	
Upstate Jobs	Bob Antonacci	347	
Total	Bob Antonacci	62,330	50.9
Democratic	John Mannion	56,438	
Working Families	John Mannion	2,427	
Women's Equality	John Mannion	1,133	
Total	John Mannion	59,998	49.0
Write-in		75	0.1
Total votes		122,403	100.0
Republican hold			

=== 2016 ===
2016 New York State Senate election, District 50
Party	Candidate	Votes	%
Republican	John DeFrancisco	85,527	
Independence	John DeFrancisco	12,065	
Conservative	John DeFrancisco	11,232	
Reform	John DeFrancisco	1,265	
Total	John DeFrancisco (incumbent)	110,089	99.1
Write-in		1,040	0.9
Total votes		111,129	100.0
Republican hold			

=== 2014 ===
2014 New York State Senate election, District 50
Party	Candidate	Votes	%
Republican	John DeFrancisco	54,896	
Independence	John DeFrancisco	10,507	
Conservative	John DeFrancisco	9,404	
Total	John DeFrancisco (incumbent)	74,807	99.0
Write-in		783	1.0
Total votes		75,590	100.0
Republican hold			

=== 2012 ===
2012 New York State Senate election, District 50
Party	Candidate	Votes	%
Republican	John DeFrancisco	72,915	
Independence	John DeFrancisco	11,463	
Conservative	John DeFrancisco	10,532	
Total	John DeFrancisco (incumbent)	94,910	85.7
Green	Michael Donnelly	15,591	14.1
Write-in		185	0.2
Total votes		110,686	100.0
Republican hold			

=== Federal results in District 50 ===
Year	Office	Results\
2020	President	Biden 55.3 – 42.5%
2016	President	Clinton 49.6 – 44.6%
2012	President	Obama 54.9 – 43.4%
2012	Senate	Gillibrand 64.6 – 32.9%
