= John DeFrancisco =

American politician

Deputy Majority Leader of the New York State Senate
- In office July 30, 2015 – December 31, 2018
- Leader: John Flanagan
- Preceded by: Tom Libous
- Succeeded by: Michael Gianaris

Member of the New York State Senate
- In office January 1, 1993 – December 31, 2018
- Preceded by: Tarky Lombardi, Jr.
- Succeeded by: Bob Antonacci
- Constituency: 49th district (1993-2002); 50th district (2003-2018)

Personal details
- Born: October 16, 1946 (age 80) Syracuse, New York, U.S.
- Party: Republican
- Spouse: Linda DeFrancisco
- Children: 3
- Education: Syracuse University (BS); Duke University (JD)
- Website: Senate website

John A. DeFrancisco (born October 16, 1946) is an American attorney and Republican politician who represented District 50 in the New York State Senate from 1993 to 2018.

== Early life, education, and military service ==
DeFrancisco graduated from Christian Brothers Academy in Syracuse, New York. He received his Bachelor's degree from Syracuse University, where he played college baseball, and later graduated from Duke University Law School. He is a veteran of the United States Air Force, where he served as a judge advocate.

== Career ==
DeFrancisco spent eleven years on the Syracuse Common Council as both a Councilor-at-large and then the Council President. He has also served in the past as the President of the Syracuse City School District Board of Education and the Vice-President of the Conference of Large City Boards of Education. He was also of counsel at the law firm of DeFrancisco and Falgiatano; an associate with the law firm of Simpson, Thatcher and Bartlett; a Judge Advocate in the United States Air Force; and the Assistant District Attorney in Onondaga County from 1975 until 1977.

=== New York State Senate ===
DeFrancisco was first elected to the State Senate in 1992.

The Albany Times Union described DeFrancisco as "an outspoken lawmaker and attorney known for his skills in floor debates. In 2010, after Republicans had lost their majority status in the Senate, DeFrancisco was "appointed chief interrogator for the Senate Republican Conference with carte blanche to grill Democrats and spotlight their flaws." A former Chair of the Senate Judiciary Committee and the Senate Finance Committee, Sen. DeFrancisco "authored the legislation that led to the implementation of the Amber Alert system" and secured state funding for a "cord blood bank [in Syracuse] that will transform medical waste into life-saving treatments." DeFrancisco opposed public financing of political campaigns, and has voted against medical marijuana legislation, the DREAM Act, and the gun control law known as the NY SAFE Act. DeFrancisco also voted against allowing same-sex marriage in New York during Senate roll-call for the 2011 Marriage Equality Act, which the Senate narrowly passed 33-29.

In 2011, DeFrancisco supported legislation that would increase medical malpractice legal fees; at the time, he was still practicing law at a firm that specialized in medical malpractice. Common Cause/New York, a good government group, accused DeFrancisco of acting in his own self-interest.

In 2015, following the resignation of Dean Skelos as Senate Majority Leader, DeFrancisco sought to succeed him in that post; however, Senate Republicans chose John J. Flanagan. Sen. DeFrancisco was elevated to the position of Senate Deputy Majority Leader in July 2015.

On April 26, 2018, DeFrancisco announced that he would not seek re-election to the Senate in November 2018.

=== 2018 gubernatorial campaign ===
On January 30, 2018, DeFrancisco announced that he was running for the Republican nomination for governor of New York; he stated that "'enough is enough.'" On April 25, 2018, he withdrew his candidacy after party leaders—who had initially given him their support—threw their support to Molinaro instead. While he considered Molinaro an inferior candidate and was disappointed by some endorsers abandoning his campaign for Molinaro's, DeFrancisco refused to divide the party with a primary battle. He nonetheless declined to endorse Molinaro, instead endorsing Stephanie Miner, a Democrat running on a third-party line. Incumbent Democratic governor Andrew Cuomo defeated Molinaro by a margin of 60% to 36%.

== Personal life ==
DeFrancisco and his wife, Linda, have three children. As of 2018, they had eight grandchildren. They reside in DeWitt, New York. DeFrancisco plays the saxophone; according to Russ Tarby of Syracuse New Times, he "blows a mean sax on Night Train." He is a Roman Catholic.

== Notes ==
New York State Senate
Preceded by Tarky Lombardi	New York State Senate, 49th District; 1993–2002	Succeeded by Nancy Larraine Hoffmann
Preceded by James Seward	New York State Senate, 50th District; 2003–2018	Succeeded by Robert E. Antonacci
