= Bill Samuels (political activist) =

American businessman and activist (born 1943)

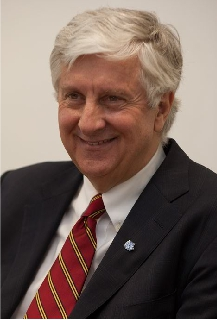
- Born: Richmond, Virginia, U.S.
- Education: MIT, Harvard Law School
- Occupations: Businessman and political activist
- Known for: Political activism - Constitutional Convention, Blue Tiger Democrats, EffectiveNY
- Movement: Democratic Party
- Spouse: Marie Samuels
- Website: effectiveny.org

William Christie Samuels is a political activist and businessman who resided in New York and now lives in Rhode Island. He was the founder of the good government group EffectiveNY and is currently the chairman of the board of the Howard Samuels Policy Center. He was awarded the 2011 Common Cause Award for outstanding commitment to government and as an innovating political thinker, and the 2017 Center for Popular Democracy Social Justice Award. Samuels was chairman and CEO of ACTV, Inc. He was instrumental in getting the inclusive New York State Equal Rights Amendment onto the ballot, which passed in 2024.

== Early life and background ==
Samuels was raised upstate in Canandaigua, New York, the son of Howard and Barbara Samuels. His father, Howard J. Samuels, served as U.S. Under Secretary of Commerce under President Lyndon B. Johnson, was Director of the Small Business Administration and founded Kordite, which made Baggies and Hefty. The company was sold to Mobil Oil in 1958. In 1974, his father ran for Governor with Mario Cuomo as his Lieutenant Governor ultimately losing to Hugh Carey.

Samuels attended MIT, where he was president of the Student Body and earned undergraduate degrees in political science, economics, and engineering. He later graduated from Harvard Law School.

After law school, he started an education company (APC Skills) dedicated to training entry-level workers lacking the necessary skills to get and keep a job, which was a priority of President Johnson's War on Poverty. In 1987, the company merged with the Alexander Proudfoot Company, which had offices in the U.S., Europe, Brazil and Mexico. In 1988, it became a publicly traded company on the London exchange (symbol MMC).

Samuels was a pioneer in the introduction of interactive television. He built ACTV, Inc., as a start up, with The Washington Post as a major investor. In 1990 it went public on NASDAQ (symbol IATV). In 2002, the company was sold to Liberty Media.

== Activism and political involvement ==
=== Council of Economic Priorities ===
In 1969, right out of law school, Samuels was one of the founders of the non-profit the Council of Economic Priorities (CEP). The council produced research on major public companies’ records on the environment, women and minority advancement, tobacco support, South Africa involvement, and other social issues. It was an early predecessor of today’s Environmental, and Social and Governance (ESG) efforts.

=== John Kerry ===
Samuels raised money and supported John Kerry’s Vietnam Veterans Against the War March on Washington on April 23, 1971. During a speech at the march, Kerry famously asked: “How do you ask a man to be the last man to die in Vietnam? How do you ask a man to be the last man to die for a mistake?”

In 2004, Samuels produced and financed George Butler's documentary film Going Upriver, The Long War of John Kerry, which was released during Kerry's presidential campaign and countered the Republican Swift Boat attacks.

=== Civil rights, Gramercy Park ===
In January 2001, a group of largely minority school children were invited to Gramercy Park by the National Arts Club. (Gramercy Park is the only private park in Manhattan.) The students were from the nearby Washington Irving High School and were part of a biology class planning to examine plants and wildlife. The chairwoman of Gramercy Park Trust, which has sovereignty over the park, ordered students to leave on two separate occasions (even calling the police to attempt to enforce their removal).

Samuels, who lived nearby, was "disturbed enough" that he hired a major law firm and financed a civil rights lawsuit. The suit alleged that teachers and students heard the trustee say "the park is not for these kinds of kids." The students won $40,000 each.

=== Democratic Party civic engagement and Blue Tiger ===
Samuels founded the Blue Tiger Democrats in 2004. The tiger was the symbol of the famous 911 fire engine brigade and became the symbol of the New York Democrats in the late 19th century.

Blue Tiger believes that the Democratic Party needs to build into its regular voter activities, civic engagement projects such as senior computer training, VA hospital support for veterans, food drives, and roadway clear-ups.

In addition to Blue Tiger’s New York State activity, Samuels met with Michigan Governor Jennifer Granholm to bring the Blue Tiger party to Michigan. The Blue Tiger program was adopted across the state. The program is still active today. In 2022, the Manistee Democratic Party set up a Blue Tiger scholarship program.

=== Governor Cuomo ===
Samuels knew Andrew Cuomo well, due to his father running with Mario Cuomo as his lieutenant governor in 1974. After Cuomo was elected governor in 2010, Samuels became an outspoken critic both in the press and on television. Samuels stated: "When history is written, [Cuomo will] just be a mediocre governor that had a Nixon personality."

Samuels threatened to run to be his lieutenant governor in 2010 and 2014, not as an ally of Cuomo but as a check.

=== Corruption in the New York State Democratic Party ===
In 2010, Samuels grew concerned about corruption in the State Senate Democratic Party—particularly with the Democratic Majority Leader, Pedro Espada.

Samuels opened offices in Espada's district and funded a major campaign to oust him. Espada was defeated and later sent to prison for five years for stealing from a non-profit.

=== Constitutional change ===
Samuels was a leader and the biggest financial supporter of the required New York State 2017 vote asking: "Shall there be a convention to revise the Constitution and amend the same?" He organized the Citizens Committee for an Effective Constitution, whose goal was to reform and update the New York State Constitution. He traveled the state with Brian Kolb, the Republican Assembly Minority leader, urging voters to approve the convention.

Voters rejected the convention and Samuels commented: “the measures’ defeat is a triumph for all of the enemies of reform in Albany.”

Samuels pursued one of his main suggestions: the need for an inclusive Equal Rights Amendment. In 2017, he and State Senator Liz Kruger held a press briefing and submitted to the State Senate a constitutional amendment that not only covered women, but many other categories such as race, color, ethnicity, national origin, religion, or sex, including sexual orientation, gender identity, gender expression. Later, the legislature added reproductive healthcare and autonomy.

The legislature approved the submission in January 2023, and it was added to the November 2024 ballot for voter approval. The measure placed New York at the forefront of legal efforts to protect reproductive rights for women, following the Supreme Court's overturning of Roe v. Wade in 2022.

=== Retirement security ===
About one and half million private sector employees in New York City have no access to a retirement saving program, unlike employees of large corporations. In response to this, Samuels designed a program called “Retirement Security for All” and introduced it to the New York City Council. During a September 2019 press conference with Mayor De Blasio, he said: “EffectiveNY is enormously gratified and pleased to see this tremendous progress towards providing all New Yorkers the means to retire with dignity.”

It was signed into law on May 11, 2021, making it the first city in the nation to create a universal retirement program through their employers.

=== 21 in 21 ===
In 2017, Samuels founded "21 in '21". At that time, there were only five women set to remain in the 2019 NYC City Council, which had 51 members. The goal was to have 21 women on the council by 2021. In 2021, 31 women were elected or 61 percent of the members.

== Personal life ==
Samuels served six years in the U.S. Army's Judge Advocate Jag Corps.

He is married to Marie Dunn Samuels and they have a daughter Kitty Samuels. He and Marie currently live in Newport, Rhode Island.
