= Harry Wilson (businessman) =

American businessman (born 1971)

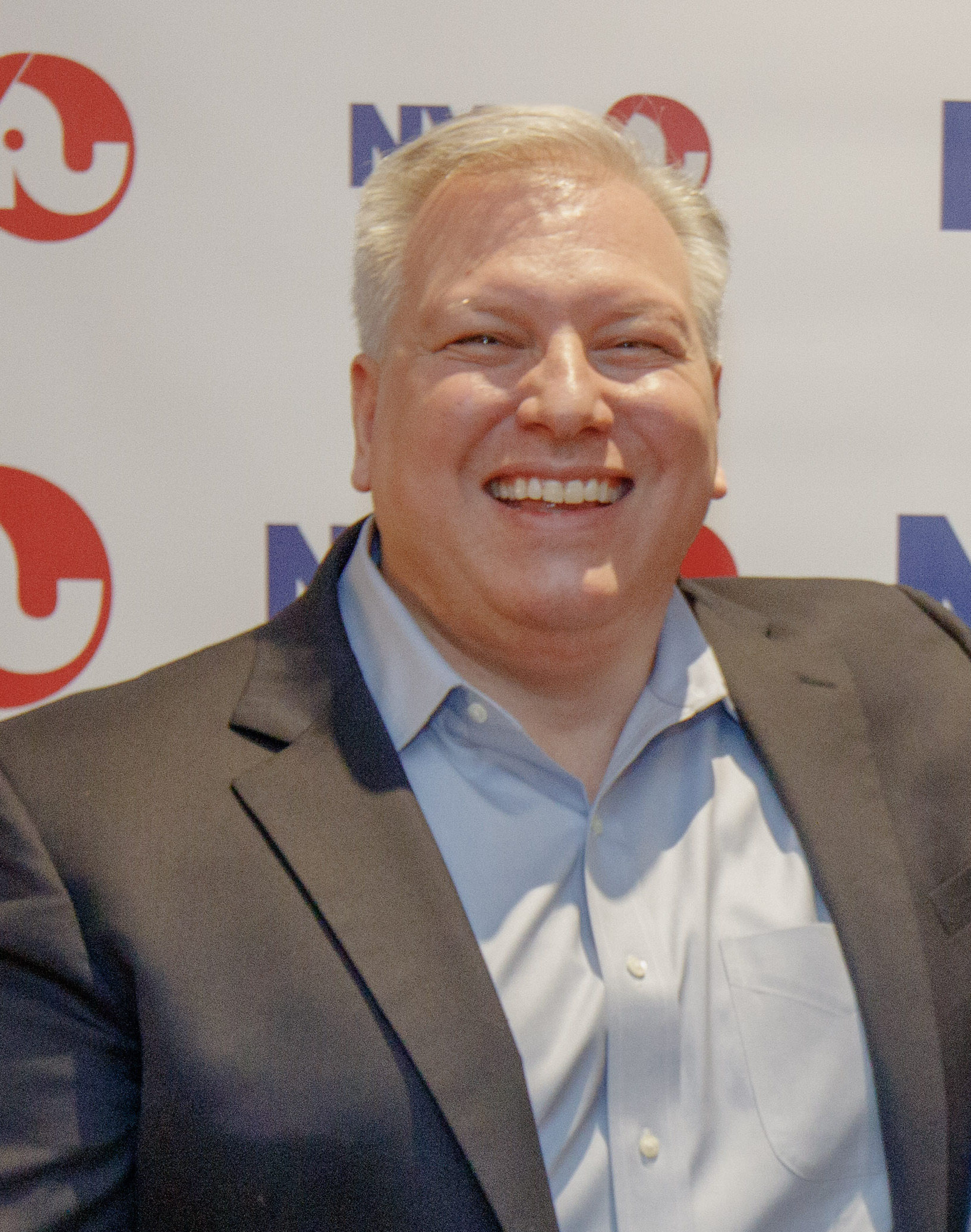

Senior Advisor on Auto Issues at the Treasury Department
- In office February, 2009 – May, 2009
- President: Barack Obama

Personal details
- Born: Harry J. Wilson; October 25, 1971 (age 55) Johnstown, New York, U.S.
- Party: Republican
- Spouse: Eva Romas
- Children: 4
- Education: Harvard University (BA, MBA)

Harry J. Wilson (born October 25, 1971) is an American businessman, former investor and turnaround expert who has served in the U.S. Treasury Department under President Barack Obama and on the 2009 Auto Industry Task Force. Wilson filed for office on February 16, 2010, running unopposed for the Republican primary for New York State Comptroller. He was defeated by incumbent Democrat Thomas DiNapoli in the general election on November 2, 2010.

On February 22, 2022, Wilson announced his candidacy for Governor of New York in the 2022 election, he lost the Republican primary, coming in last with 14.7% of the vote.

== Early life and education ==
Harry Wilson is the son of Jim and Niki Wilson. Jim was a resident of Johnstown, New York, and Niki was born and raised in central Greece before moving to Johnstown. Jim was a bartender, and Niki was a housewife and later a sewing machine operator. Wilson graduated as valedictorian from Johnstown High School. He obtained an AB with honors in government and an MBA from Harvard University, where he was president of the Harvard Republican Club in 1991; in that role, Wilson was outspoken in his efforts to increase the club's appeal to women with a "big tent" approach.

== Business career ==
Wilson has worked for Blackstone Group and Goldman Sachs. He later became a partner at Silver Point Capital before his retirement at the age of 36. He joined Yahoo!'s board of directors in May 2012.

Wilson is the CEO of the MAEVA Group, an advisory firm he founded in White Plains, New York in 2011. In March 2021 he was appointed CEO of Genesis HealthCare.

== Politics and government ==
After a career as a money management executive, Wilson left the business world to pursue charity work and public service at the age of 36. He served on President Barack Obama's auto industry crisis task force. He took the position at the age of 37 with the Treasury Department in March, 2009 at the request of Steven Rattner, the lead adviser on the auto industry crisis. Wilson led a small group of people within the auto task force known internally as the "deals and diligence team", which did much of the analytical research that underpinned the task force's policy decisions, conducting interviews, touring auto plants and poring over financial records. Wilson testified at GM's bankruptcy court hearings in the Southern District Bankruptcy Court of New York in July, 2009, noting that the government intends to sell its shares in the bankrupt GM. Wilson was also one of four senior advisers for the U.S. Treasury Department under President Obama.

Lee Zeldin, a 2022 Republican primary opponent in the governor's race, has criticized Wilson's efforts to save GM as "working for Obama", but neglects to say that Wilson saved several thousand jobs GM jobs for New York workers, both at GM locations and GM supplier locations in New York State,

In 2009, Wilson was a member of Westchester County Executive-elect Rob Astorino's transition team.

=== 2010 campaign for New York State Comptroller ===
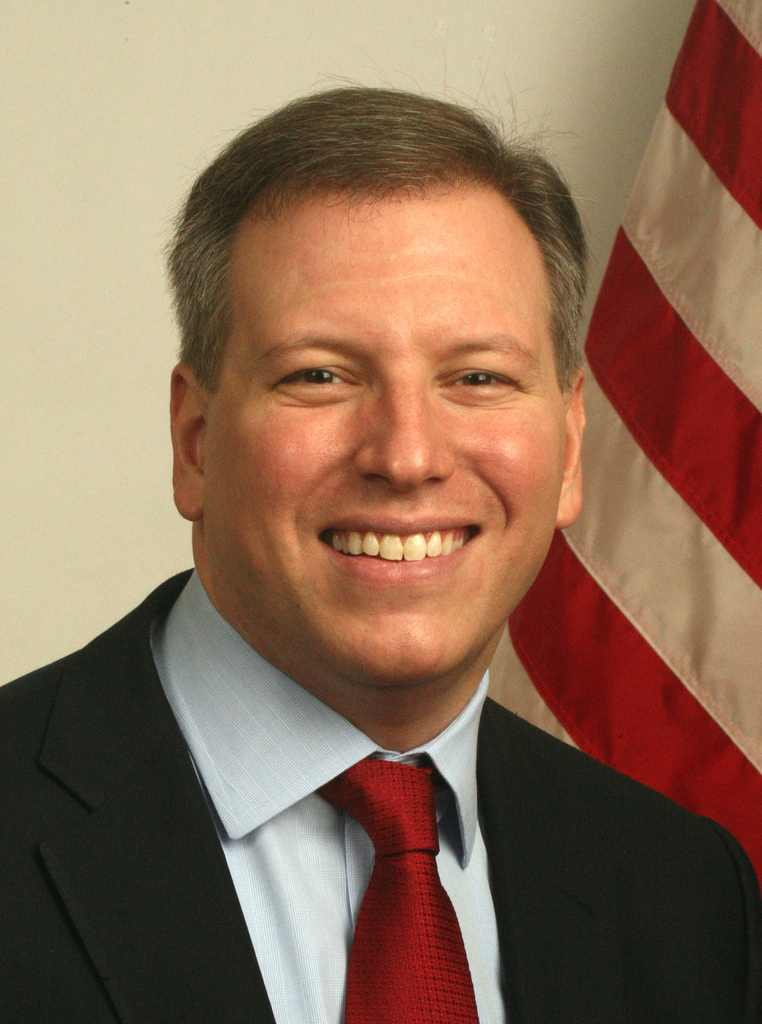
Wilson in 2010

On February 16, 2010, Wilson announced his candidacy in the Republican primary for New York State Comptroller. He ran unopposed for the nomination, and ran against incumbent Democrat Thomas DiNapoli in the general election. Wilson garnered the endorsements of New York City's three major daily newspapers - the New York Daily News, New York Post, and New York Times - considered a major achievement given the three newspapers' differing political perspectives. It was the first time since 1976 that a challenger had swept all three endorsements.

DiNapoli prevailed over Wilson in the November 2, 2010 general election by a margin of 50.78%-46.26%. Wilson conceded defeat the day after the election. Despite the loss, Capitol News rated Wilson's campaign the best in 2010 in all of New York State, as Wilson had the closest showing for a New York statewide Republican campaign since 2002.

=== Fundraising for Republican candidates ===
In 2012, Wilson raised funds for the unsuccessful campaigns of Republican candidates Matt Doheny for Congress and Wendy Long for the United States Senate.

=== Potential 2018 campaign for Governor of New York ===
Wilson considered running for governor in the 2018 New York gubernatorial race against incumbent Andrew Cuomo, and had vowed to spend $10 million of his own money on the campaign. Though he was regarded as a favorite by some Republican leaders, in December 2017, he announced his decision not to run, as he did not want to spend the time away from his family.

=== 2022 campaign for Governor of New York ===
In January 2022, the New York Post reported that Wilson was considering running for governor in the 2022 election.

Wilson announced his candidacy for governor of New York on February 22, 2022. Fox News reported that Wilson would invest $12 million of his own money in the race, and that he would release an immediate statewide advertising blitz.

Wilson faced three other candidates in the Republican gubernatorial primary.

Wilson promised to reduce the size of the New York State government by eliminating waste and inefficiencies, something done throughout his business career. He promised to cut income taxes by 20% and property taxes by another 20%

== Personal life ==
Wilson married Eva Romas in 1997. They have four daughters, and live in Scarsdale, New York. Wilson is a member of the Greek Orthodox Church.

== Electoral history ==
2010 New York Comptroller election
| Party | Candidate | Votes | % |
|---|---|---|---|
| Democratic | Thomas P. DiNapoli (incumbent) | 2,271,666 | 50.78% |
| Republican | Harry Wilson | 2,069,427 | 46.26% |
| Green | Julia A. Willebrand | 104,445 | 2.33% |
| Libertarian | John Gaetani | 27,882 | 0.62% |
| Total votes | | 4,473,420 | 100% |
| Democratic hold | | | |

2022 Republican gubernatorial primary results
| Party | Candidate | Votes | % |
|---|---|---|---|
| Republican | Lee Zeldin | 193,184 | 44.1 |
| Republican | Andrew Giuliani | 100,372 | 22.9 |
| Republican | Rob Astorino | 80,223 | 18.3 |
| Republican | Harry Wilson | 64,594 | 14.7 |
| Total votes | | 438,373 | 100 |

Party political offices
| Preceded by Christopher Callaghan | Republican nominee for Comptroller of New York; 2010 | Succeeded by Bob Antonacci |
