= 2018 New York State Comptroller election =

2018 New York Comptroller election
- November 6, 2018
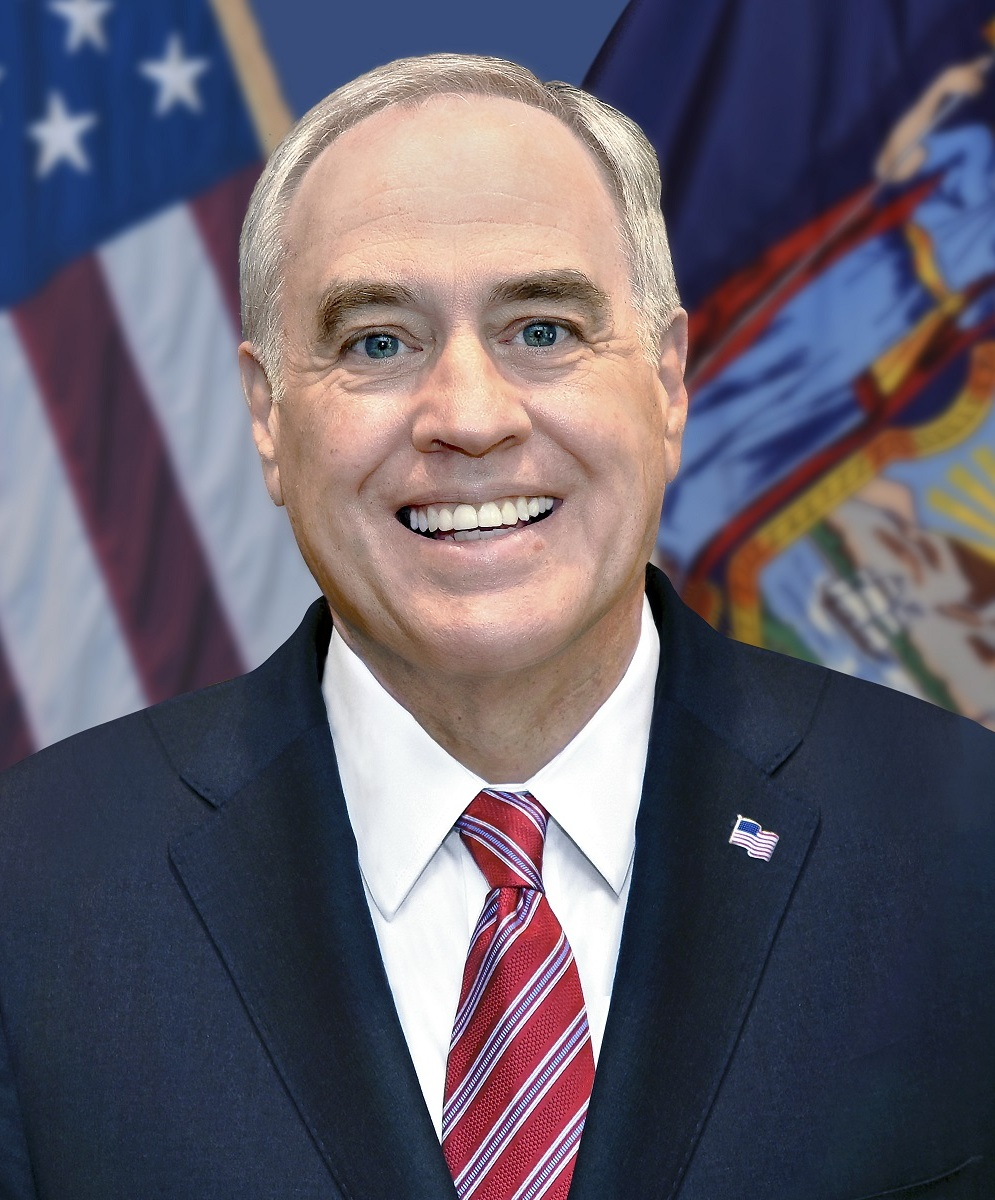

Nominee	Thomas DiNapoli	Jonathan Trichter
Party	Democratic	Republican
Alliance	Parties: Independence; Reform; Women's Equality; Working Families	Parties: Conservative
Popular vote	4,027,886	1,882,958
Percentage	66.94%	31.29%
- DiNapoli: 40–50% 50–60% 60–70% 70–80% 80–90% >90% Trichter: 40–50% 50–60% 60–70% 70–80% 80–90% >90% Tie: 40–50% 50% No votes

The 2018 New York Comptroller election was held on November 6, 2018, alongside other New York elections for Governor, State Senate, State Assembly, and Attorney General. Incumbent Democrat Thomas DiNapoli easily won a third term, defeating Republican nominee Jonathan Trichter and minor party candidates.

In the general election, DiNapoli carried every county won by Andrew Cuomo in the concurrent gubernatorial election as well as Orange, Putnam, Dutchess, Sullivan, Columbia, Rensselaer, Washington, Saratoga, Schenectady, Otsego, Montgomery, Warren, Essex, Clinton, Franklin, St. Lawrence, Oneida, Madison, Broome, Cortland, Cayuga, Seneca, Ontario, Niagara, and Chautauqua counties.

== Results ==
New York Comptroller election, 2018
Party	Candidate	Votes	%	±%
Democratic	Thomas DiNapoli	3,714,787	61.74%	+9.61%
Working Families	Thomas DiNapoli	155,873	2.59%	−2.13%
Independence	Thomas DiNapoli	106,971	1.78%	−1.51%
Women's Equality	Thomas DiNapoli	35,613	0.59%	N/A
Reform	Thomas DiNapoli	14,642	0.24%	N/A
Total	Thomas DiNapoli (incumbent)	4,027,886	66.94%	+6.80%
Republican	Jonathan Trichter	1,651,578	27.45%	−2.39%
Conservative	Jonathan Trichter	231,380	3.85%	−2.79%
Total	Jonathan Trichter	1,882,958	31.29%	−5.19%
Green	Mark Dunlea	70,041	1.16%	−1.48%
Libertarian	Cruger E. Gallaudet	34,430	0.57%	−0.15%
Write-ins		1,633	0.03%	+0.00%
Total votes		6,016,948	100.00%	N/A
Democratic hold				
