= 2018 New York gubernatorial election =

- November 6, 2018
- Turnout: 48.0% ▲14.8pp
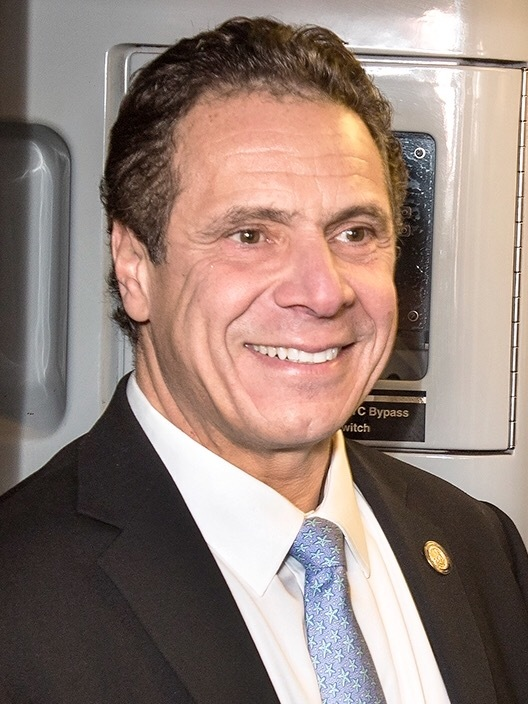

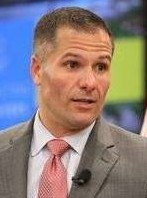
| Nominee | Andrew Cuomo | Marc Molinaro |
| Party | Democratic | Republican |
| Alliance | Parties: Independence; Women's Equality; Working Families | Parties: Conservative; Reform |
| Running mate | Kathy Hochul | Julie Killian |
| Popular vote | 3,635,340 | 2,207,602 |
| Percentage | 59.55% | 36.16% |
- Cuomo: 30–40% 40–50% 50–60% 60–70% 70–80% 80–90% >90% Molinaro: 40–50% 50–60% 60–70% 70–80% 80–90% >90% Tie: 40–50% 50% No data
Governor before election
Andrew Cuomo
Democratic
Elected Governor
Andrew Cuomo
Democratic

The 2018 New York gubernatorial election occurred on November 6, 2018. Incumbent Democratic Governor Andrew Cuomo won a third term, defeating Republican Marc Molinaro and several minor party candidates.

Cuomo defeated actress and activist Cynthia Nixon in the Democratic gubernatorial primary. Cuomo's running mate, Lt. Governor Kathy Hochul, beat New York City councillor Jumaane Williams in the Democratic primary for the lieutenant governorship. Democratic candidates Cuomo and Hochul also ran on the ballot lines of the Independence Party and the Women's Equality Party; after Nixon and Williams withdrew from the race in October, Cuomo and Hochul received the nomination of the Working Families Party as well. Dutchess County Executive and former New York State Assemblymember Marc Molinaro was the Republican, Conservative, and Reform Party candidate. Molinaro's running mate was former Rye City Councilmember Julie Killian.

Cuomo was sworn in for a third term as governor on January 1, 2019. He would announced his resignation from the governorship on August 10, 2021, following sexual harassment allegations and a nursing home scandal that plagued his third term. He officially resigned on August 23.

== Background ==
Incumbent governor Andrew Cuomo was first elected governor in 2010 and was re-elected in 2014. As of 2018, New York gubernatorial elections operated on a split primary system; candidates for governor and lieutenant governor in each party ran in separate primary elections. In the general election, however, candidates for governor and lieutenant governor formed united tickets within each party. Also, New York allows electoral fusion, in which candidates may appear on multiple ballot lines in the same election.

The results of the gubernatorial election determined ballot access and ballot order. As of 2018, a party's gubernatorial candidate had to receive 50,000 votes or more for that party to obtain automatic ballot status in New York for the following four years. The last Republican to win a gubernatorial election in New York was George Pataki in 2002.

== Democratic primary ==
On November 15, 2016, Governor Andrew Cuomo announced his intention to seek a third term in office. On May 23, 2018, Cuomo secured the nomination of the Democratic Party at its state convention, winning support from more than 95% of the state delegates. No other candidates qualified for the primary ballot at the convention, as they all failed to meet the 25% delegate threshold. Actress and activist Cynthia Nixon sought to petition her way onto the Democratic primary ballot. By July 12, Nixon had obtained 65,000 signatures, which was more than four times the 15,000 signatures needed to force a primary election.

=== Candidates ===
==== Nominee ====
- Andrew Cuomo, governor of New York

==== Eliminated in primary ====
- Cynthia Nixon, actress and activist

==== Withdrew ====
- Randy Credico, perennial candidate (endorsed Nixon)
- Terry Gipson, former state senator

==== Declined ====
- Preet Bharara, former United States Attorney for the Southern District of New York
- Byron Brown, mayor of Buffalo and chairman of the New York State Democratic Party
- Hillary Clinton, 67th US Secretary of State; former U.S. senator from NY; former First Lady of the United States; 2008 Democratic presidential candidate; Democratic nominee for president in 2016 (endorsed Cuomo)
- Thomas DiNapoli, Comptroller of New York (ran for reelection)
- Kirsten Gillibrand, incumbent U.S. senator from New York (ran for reelection; endorsed Cuomo)
- Stephanie Miner, former mayor of Syracuse (declined to seek Democratic Party nomination, ran for governor on the Serve America Movement ticket)
- Eric Schneiderman, Attorney General of New York (resigned from public office May 7, 2018, following accusations of domestic violence)
- Zephyr Teachout, law professor at Fordham University, candidate for governor in 2014 and nominee for NY-19 in 2016 (endorsed Nixon; ran for attorney general)
- Jumaane Williams, member of the NYC Council (endorsed Nixon; ran for lieutenant governor)

==== Endorsements ====
Cynthia Nixon

State legislators

- Tom Abinanti, assemblymember
- Andrew Hevesi, assemblymember

Local officials

- Brad Lander, NYC Councilmember from the 39th district
- Melissa Mark-Viverito, former Speaker of the New York City Council from the 8th district
- Jimmy Van Bramer, New York City Council member for the 26th District

Individuals

- El-P, rapper, record producer, and record executive
- Bill McKibben, environmentalist
- Alexandria Ocasio-Cortez, nominee for NY-14, educator, political organizer, and former congressional staffer
- Sarah Jessica Parker, actress
- Julia Salazar, candidate for New York State Senate District 18
- Richard Stallman, president of the Free Software Foundation

Organizations

- 350 Action
- Citizen Action
- Daily Kos
- Democracy for America
- NYC Democratic Socialists
- Indivisible Brooklyn
- Jim Owles Club
- Justice Democrats
- Our Revolution
- Progressive Change Campaign Committee
- Working Families Party

Media

- The Nation

==== Polling ====
| Poll source | Date(s) administered | Sample size | Margin of error | Andrew Cuomo | Cynthia Nixon | Other | Undecided |
|---|---|---|---|---|---|---|---|
| Siena College | September 4–7, 2018 | 509 | ± 4.3% | 63% | 22% | 4% | 11% |
| Siena College | July 22–26, 2018 | 630 | ± 3.9% | 60% | 29% | 1% | 10% |
| Quinnipiac University | July 12–16, 2018 | 415 | ± 6.2% | 59% | 23% | 2% | 15% |
| Zogby Analytics | June 27 – July 3, 2018 | – | – | 63% | 22% | – | 15% |
| Siena College | June 4–7, 2018 | – | – | 61% | 26% | 0% | 11% |
| Quinnipiac University | April 26 – May 1, 2018 | 473 | ± 5.7% | 50% | 28% | – | 22% |
| Siena College | April 8–12, 2018 | – | – | 58% | 27% | 5% | 11% |
| Marist College | April 3–9, 2018 | 364 | ± 6.0% | 68% | 21% | – | 11% |
| Remington (R-Big Dog Strategies) | April 7–8, 2018 | 2,038 | ± 2.2% | 60% | 20% | – | 19% |
| Siena College | March 11–16, 2018 | 363 | ± 4.0% | 66% | 19% | 1% | 9% |

==== Debates and forums ====
- Hofstra University – August 29, 2018 – WCBS-TV

=== Results ===
County results for the Democratic gubernatorial primary Cuomo: 50–60% 60–70% 70–80% 80–90% Nixon: 50–60%

On September 13, 2018, Cuomo defeated Nixon in the Democratic gubernatorial primary.

2018 Democratic primary results Governor of New York
| Party | Candidate | Votes | % |
|---|---|---|---|
| Democratic | Andrew Cuomo (incumbent) | 1,021,160 | 65.53% |
| Democratic | Cynthia Nixon | 537,192 | 34.47% |
| Total votes | | 1,558,352 | 100% |

=== Lieutenant governor ===
==== Nominee ====
- Kathy Hochul, incumbent lieutenant governor of New York

==== Eliminated in primary ====
- Jumaane Williams, New York City Council member

=== Results ===
County results for the Democratic lieutenant governor primary Hochul: 50–60% 60–70% 70–80% Williams: 50–60% 60–70%

Incumbent Lieutenant Governor Kathy Hochul narrowly defeated New York City Councillor Jumaane Williams in the Democratic primary.

2018 Democratic primary results Lieutenant governor of New York
| Party | Candidate | Votes | % |
|---|---|---|---|
| Democratic | Kathy Hochul (incumbent) | 733,591 | 53.3% |
| Democratic | Jumaane Williams | 641,633 | 46.7% |
| Total votes | | 1,375,224 | 100% |

== Republican primary ==
On May 23, 2018, the party unanimously nominated Marc Molinaro as its candidate for governor of New York at its state convention. No challengers attempted to petition onto the primary ballot, so no Republican primary took place. Deputy Senate Majority Leader John A. DeFrancisco ran for the Republican nomination, but withdrew his candidacy on April 25, 2018 after party leaders—who had initially given him their support—threw their support to Molinaro instead.

=== Governor ===
==== Candidates ====
===== Nominee =====
- Marc Molinaro, Dutchess County Executive and former member of the New York State Assembly
  - Running mate: Julie Killian, former Rye city councilwoman and state senate nominee

===== Withdrew =====
- John A. DeFrancisco, Deputy Majority Leader of the New York State Senate
- Joel Giambra, former Erie County Executive
- Joe Holland, former commissioner of the New York Department of Housing and Community Renewal (ran for Attorney General instead)
- Brian Kolb, Minority Leader of the New York State Assembly

===== Declined =====
- Rob Astorino, former Westchester County Executive and Republican nominee for governor in 2014
- John P. Cahill, former commissioner of the New York Department of Environmental Conservation; former chief of staff to Governor George Pataki; Republican nominee for attorney general in 2014
- John J. Flanagan, Majority Leader of the New York State Senate
- Chris Gibson, former U.S. representative
- Carl Paladino, former member of the Buffalo Public Schools Board of Education and nominee for governor in 2010
- Donald Trump Jr., businessman and son of U.S. president Donald Trump
- Harry Wilson, businessman and nominee for State Comptroller in 2010

==== Endorsements ====
John DeFrancisco (withdrew)

Federal politicians

- John Katko, U.S. representative

State legislators

- Fred Akshar, New York state senator
- George Amedore, New York state senator
- John Bonacic, New York state senator
- Phil Boyle, New York state senator
- Tom Croci, New York state senator
- John J. Flanagan, Majority Leader of the New York State Senate
- Rich Funke, New York state senator
- Patrick M. Gallivan, New York state senator
- Joseph Griffo, New York state senator
- Bill Larkin, New York state senator
- Kathy Marchione, New York state senator
- Rob Ortt, New York state senator
- Mike Ranzenhofer, New York state senator
- Patty Ritchie, New York state senator
- Joseph Robach, New York state senator
- Sue Serino, New York state senator
- James Seward, New York state senator
- Jim Tedisco, New York state senator
- Cathy Young, New York state senator

Municipal leaders

- Jacqueline Izzo, mayor of Rome
- Todd A. Rouse, former mayor of Canastota and chairman of the Madison County Republican Committee

Municipal legislators

- Rodney Strange, Chemung County Legislator and chairman of the Chemung County Republican Committee

Organizations

- Albany County Republican Committee
- Broome County Republican Committee
- Cattaraugus County Republican Committee
- Chenango County Republican Committee
- Delaware County Republican Committee
- Jefferson County Republican Committee
- Lewis County Republican Committee
- Madison County Republican Committee
- Montgomery County Republican Committee
- Niagara County Republican Committee
- Oneida County Republican Committee
- Onondaga County Conservative Committee
- Onondaga County Republican Committee
- Tioga County Republican Committee
Brian Kolb (withdrew)

State legislators

- Ronald Castorina, New York State Assemblyman and chairman of the Richmond County Republican Committee
- Nicole Malliotakis, New York State Assemblywoman and 2017 Republican nominee for Mayor of New York City
- Bob Oaks, New York State Assemblyman and chairman of the Wayne County Republican Committee

Municipal leaders

- Bill Reilich, Town Supervisor of Greece, former New York State Assemblyman and chairman of the Monroe County Republican Committee

Organizations

- Allegany County Republican Committee
- Clinton County Republican Committee
- Livingston County Republican Committee
- Monroe County Republican Committee
- Ontario County Republican Committee
- Richmond County Republican Committee
- Schuyler County Republican Committee
- Seneca County Republican Committee
- Steuben County Republican Committee
- Wayne County Republican Committee
- Yates County Republican Committee

==== Polling ====
Hypothetical polling

| Poll source | Date(s) administered | Sample size | Margin of error | John DeFrancisco | Marc Molinaro | Other | Undecided |
|---|---|---|---|---|---|---|---|
| Siena College | April 8–12, 2018 | – | – | 18% | 18% | 0% | 53% |
| Siena College | March 11–16, 2018 | 170 | 4.0% | 21% | 17% | 0% | 49% |

== Independent and third-party candidates ==
=== Third parties with automatic ballot access ===
In addition to the Democratic and Republican Parties, six other political parties had automatic ballot access; all six chose to exercise it. In order of ballot appearance, those parties are:

- Conservative Party of New York State: On April 13, 2018, in what party chairman Michael R. Long termed a "not very easy" decision, the Conservative Party Executive Committee selected Marc Molinaro over Deputy Senate Majority Leader John A. DeFrancisco as its gubernatorial endorsee.
  - Nominee: Marc Molinaro
- Green Party of New York: On April 12, 2018, Howie Hawkins, after initially implying after the 2014 election that he would not seek the office again, launched his third consecutive campaign for the position, his 21st campaign for public office.
  - Nominee: Howie Hawkins, party co-founder and perennial candidate
    - Running mate: Jia Lee, United Federation of Teachers chapter leader and public school teacher
- Working Families Party: On April 14, 2018, by a 91–8 margin, the Working Families Party endorsed Cynthia Nixon as its gubernatorial candidate, with Jumaane Williams as her running mate. The endorsement came after the labor unions that formed part of Cuomo's political machine, who were able to force the party to nominate Cuomo instead of Zephyr Teachout in 2014, withdrew from the party, and Cuomo declined to seek the party's line. On September 13, 2018, after being defeated by Cuomo in the Democratic primary, Nixon declined to say whether she would continue to run for governor on the Working Families Party line. On October 3, the Working Families Party offered Cuomo and Hochul their party's ballot line. Cuomo and Hochul accepted that offer on October 5.
  - Nominee: Andrew Cuomo (replacing the withdrawn Cynthia Nixon)
    - Running mate: Kathy Hochul (replacing the withdrawn Jumaane Williams)
- Independence Party of New York: On December 23, 2017, the party endorsed incumbent governor Andrew Cuomo for the third consecutive election cycle.
  - Nominee: Andrew Cuomo
- Women's Equality Party: The party endorsed Cuomo for re-election, as the party remained allied with the Cuomo campaign.
  - Nominee: Andrew Cuomo
- Reform Party of New York State: On May 19, after the party's executive committee deadlocked between Marc Molinaro and Joel Giambra in April, delegates at the Reform Party state convention nominated Republican frontrunner Molinaro for governor.
  - Nominee: Marc Molinaro

=== Independent candidates and third parties without automatic ballot access ===
Any candidate not among the eight qualified New York political parties (Democratic, Republican, Conservative, Green, Working Families, Independence, Women's Equality and Reform, respectively) was required to submit petitions to gain ballot access. Such candidates did not face primary elections. At the time, third parties whose respective gubernatorial candidates received at least 50,000 votes in the general election secured automatic ballot access in all state and federal elections through the 2022 elections, but due to a 2020 law to change the requirements, four parties lost that access in 2020 (Libertarian, Independence, Working Families, Serve America Movement).

==== Libertarian Party ====
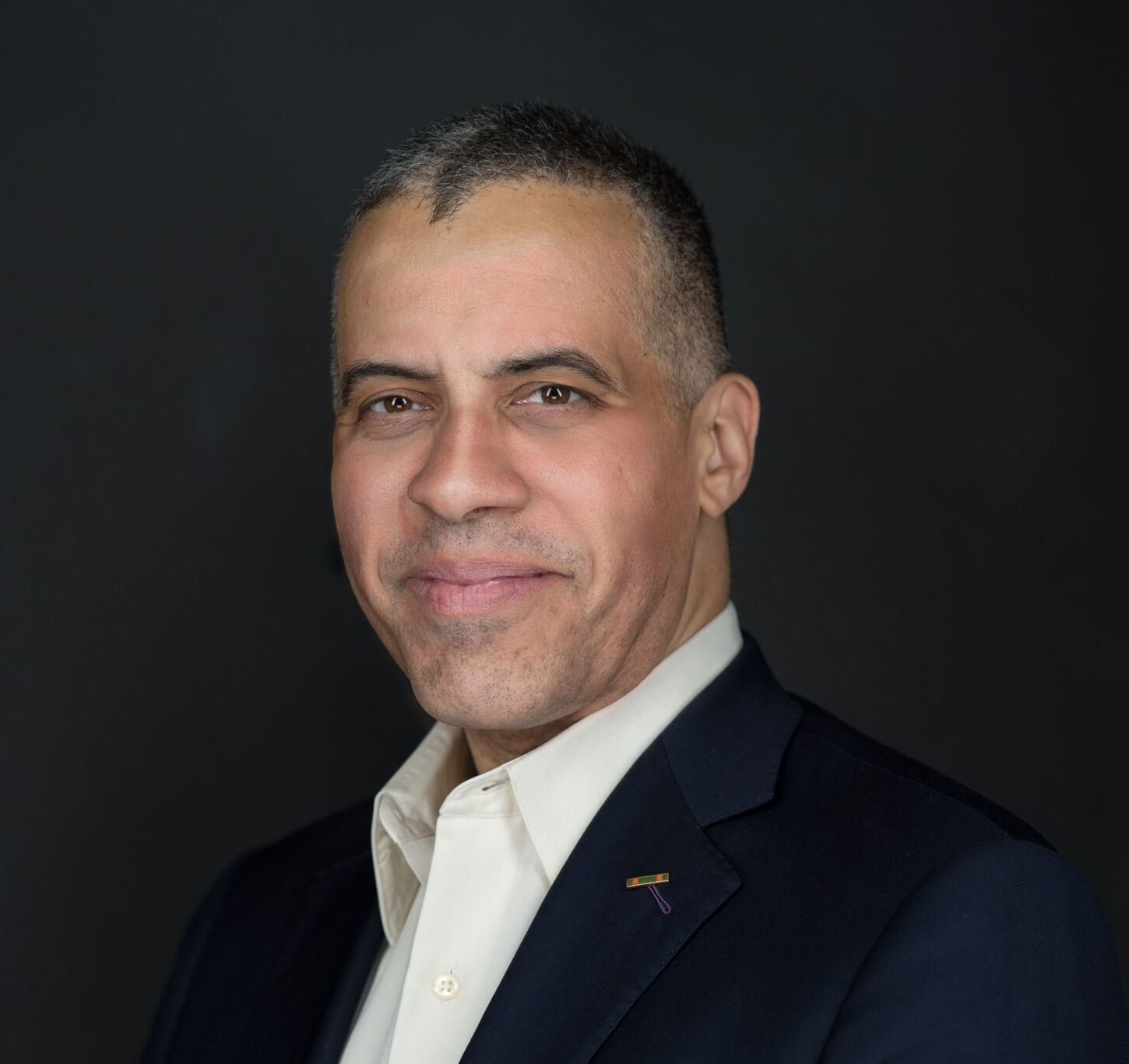
Business consultant and runner-up in the 2016 Libertarian Party vice presidential primary Larry Sharpe ran on the Libertarian Party line.

On July 12, 2017, Larry Sharpe, business consultant and runner-up in the 2016 Libertarian Party vice presidential primary, officially announced that he would run for governor of New York in 2018. Sharpe was the first person to announce his candidacy to run against incumbent governor Andrew Cuomo. On August 19, 2018, the Libertarian Party announced it had collected over 30,000 signatures to place its ticket onto the November ballot. Sharpe's petitions survived a petition challenge.

- Nominee: Larry Sharpe, business consultant and runner-up in the 2016 Libertarian Party vice presidential primary
  - Running mate: Andrew Hollister, candidate for Rochester City Council in 2017

==== Serve America Movement ====
On June 18, 2018, former Syracuse Mayor Stephanie Miner, after expressing informal interest in the Working Families and Reform nominations, entered the gubernatorial race as a third-party candidate. Miner circulated designating petitions to create a Serve America Movement (SAM) Party in New York. On August 21, her campaign announced that it had submitted over 40,000 petition signatures.

- Nominee: Stephanie Miner, former state Democratic Party chairwoman and former mayor of Syracuse
  - Running mate: Michael Volpe, mayor of Pelham

==== Rent Is Too Damn High Party (disqualified) ====
Jimmy McMillan, the party's founder and figurehead, indicated on the party website that he would make another attempt at the office. He submitted petitions on August 21, 2018, with himself as the gubernatorial nominee and Christialle Felix as his running mate. When the ballot order was released, McMillan and the Rent Is Too Damn High Party had been disqualified and removed from the ballot.

== General election ==
=== Debates ===
| Host network | Date | Link(s) | Participants | | | | |
| Host network | Date | Link(s) | Andrew Cuomo (D) | Marc Molinaro (R) | Larry Sharpe (L) | Howie Hawkins (G) | Stephanie Miner (SAM) |
|---|---|---|---|---|---|---|---|
| WCBS-TV | October 23, 2018 | | Participant | Participant | Non-invitee | Non-invitee | Non-invitee |
| College of St. Rose | November 1, 2018 | | Absentee | Participant | Participant | Participant | Participant |

=== Endorsements ===
Andrew Cuomo (D)

U.S. cabinet members and cabinet-level officials

- Joe Biden, 47th vice president of the United States
- Hillary Clinton, US senator from New York (2001–2009), 67th United States secretary of state, 2008 Democratic presidential candidate and 2016 Democratic nominee for president
- Tom Perez, 26th United States Secretary of Labor, chairman of the Democratic National Committee

State officials

- Kathy Hochul, lieutenant governor of New York

U.S. senators

- Kirsten Gillibrand, U.S. senator (D-NY)
- Chuck Schumer, U.S. senator (D-NY)

U.S. representatives

- José E. Serrano, U.S. representative (D-NY-15)
- Nydia Velázquez, U.S. representative (D-NY-7)

Local and state politicians

- Marcos Crespo, assemblymember, chair of the Bronx County Democratic Committee
- Corey Johnson, speaker of the New York City Council

Organizations

- 1199SEIU United Healthcare Workers East
- Citizens Union
- Civil Service Employees Association
- Human Rights Campaign
- National Organization for Women – New York
- New York State Democratic Committee
- NYS AFL–CIO
- Planned Parenthood Empire State Acts
- Public Employees Federation
- Stonewall Democrats
- United Food & Commercial Workers Local 1500

Media

- Buffalo News editorial
- The New York Times editorial board team

Individuals

- Nicki Minaj, rapper
Marc Molinaro (R)

U.S. governors

- George Pataki, governor of New York (former)
- Chris Sununu, governor of New Hampshire

U.S. representatives

- Chris Gibson, former U.S. representative (R-NY-19)
- Peter King, U.S. representative (R-NY-2)
- Elise Stefanik, U.S. representative (R-NY-21)

State legislators

- Gary Finch, state assemblyman
- Brian Kolb, state assemblyman (minority leader)
- Nicole Malliotakis, state assemblywoman
- James Seward, state senator

County officials

- Steven McLaughlin, Rensselaer County executive
- Anthony Picente, Oneida County executive

Individuals

- Ann Barcher, former Town of Poughkeepsie supervisor (Democrat)
- Joe Borelli, New York city councilman
- Steve Forbes, businessman
- Joseph Mondello, U.S. Ambassador to Trinidad and Tobago, former chairman of the Nassau County Republican Committee
- Eric Ulrich, New York city councilman

Organizations

- Allegany County Republican Committee
- Associated Builders and Contractors
- Chemung County Republican Committee (previously endorsed John DeFrancisco)
- Clinton County Republican Committee
- Erie County Republican Committee
- Franklin County Republican Committee
- Law Enforcement Medal of Honor Committee
- Manhattan Republican Committee
- Monroe County Republican Committee
- New York City Fire Marshals Benevolent Association
- New York Veteran Police Association
- Otsego County Republican Committee
- Putnam County Republican Committee
- Queens Republican Committee
- Schuyler County Republican Committee
- Seneca County Republican Committee
- Suffolk County Republican Committee
- Sullivan County Republican Committee (previously endorsed John DeFrancisco)
- Ulster County Republican Committee
- Washington County Republican Committee
- Yates County Republican Committee

Newspapers

- The Citizen
- The Daily Gazette
- Jewish Voice
- The Post-Standard
- The Post-Star
- Watertown Daily Times
Larry Sharpe (L)

U.S. governors

- Gary Johnson, former governor of New Mexico and Libertarian Party presidential nominee in 2012 and 2016
- William Weld, former governor of Massachusetts and Libertarian Party vice-presidential nominee in 2016

U.S. municipal legislators

- William Brooke Harris, Republican Allegany County legislator

Other politicians

- Craig Bowden, 2018 Libertarian candidate for U.S. Senate from Utah
- Joseph Byrne, trustee on the Valley Central School District Board of Education
- Michelle Darnell, 2017 Libertarian candidate for Washington state Representative
- Dale Kerns, 2018 Libertarian nominee for U.S. Senate in Pennsylvania
- Michael McDermott, 2014 Libertarian nominee for Governor of New York
- Austin Petersen, 2018 Republican candidate for U.S. Senate in Missouri and 2016 Libertarian candidate for president of the United States
- Stevan Porter, 2018 Libertarian candidate for Virginia's 11th congressional district
- James Rosenbeck, chairman of the Libertarian Party of New York
- James Tosone, 2018 Libertarian nominee for United States Congress, New Jersey District 5
- Nickolas Wildstar, 2018 Libertarian candidate for governor of California

Individuals

- Glenn Beck, conservative political commentator and radio host at TheBlaze
- Bob Confer, columnist for the Lockport Union-Sun & Journal and the Niagara Gazette
- Jeremy Frankel, writer for The Daily Wire
- Shannon Joy, WYSL radio host
- Matthew Kolken, immigration lawyer and elected member of the AILA board of directors
- Joanne Nosuchinsky, 2013 Miss New York USA and co-host of Mornin'!!! with Bill Schulz
- Aron Price, professional golfer
- Evan Roberts, sports radio talk personality and co-host of Joe & Evan
- Joe Rogan, comedian, mixed martial arts color commentator, podcast host, and businessman
- Dave Rubin, political commentator and talk show host, creator and host of The Rubin Report
- Bill Schulz, journalist, television personality and host of Mornin'!!! with Bill Schulz
- John Stossel, author, journalist and libertarian news commentator
- Katherine Timpf, comedian, reporter and Fox News television personality
- Gerald Walker, hip-hop musician
- Matt Welch, journalist at Reason

Organizations

- 71Republic
- Libertarian Youth Caucus
- Marijuana Reform Party of New York state
- Monroe County Libertarian Party
- Onondaga County Libertarian Party
- Otsego County Libertarian Party
Howie Hawkins (G)

Local politicians (former)

- Jill Stein, physician, activist, former local politician, Green Party's presidential nominee in the 2012 and 2016 elections and candidate for governor of Massachusetts in 2002 and 2010

Individuals

- Jimmy Dore, stand-up comedian and political commentator known for hosting The Jimmy Dore Show and co-hosting The Aggressive Progressives on Young Turks
Stephanie Miner (SAM)

Newspapers

- Adirondack Daily Enterprise

=== Predictions ===
| Source | Ranking | As of |
|---|---|---|
| The Cook Political Report | Safe D | October 26, 2018 |
| The Washington Post | Safe D | November 5, 2018 |
| FiveThirtyEight | Safe D | November 5, 2018 |
| Rothenberg Political Report | Safe D | November 1, 2018 |
| Sabato's Crystal Ball | Safe D | November 5, 2018 |
| RealClearPolitics | Safe D | November 4, 2018 |
| Daily Kos | Safe D | November 5, 2018 |
| Fox News (Note: The Fox News Midterm Power Rankings uniquely does not contain a category for Safe/Solid races) | Likely D | November 5, 2018 |
| Politico | Safe D | November 5, 2018 |
| Governing | Safe D | November 5, 2018 |

=== Polling ===
Aggregate polls

| Source of poll aggregation | Dates administered | Dates updated | Andrew Cuomo (D) | Marc Molinaro (R) | Undecided (Note: Calculated by taking the difference of 100% and all other candidates combined.) | Margin |
|---|---|---|---|---|---|---|
| Real Clear Politics | October 10 – November 1, 2018 | November 1, 2018 | 53.5% | 35.5% | 11% | Cuomo +18.0 |
| FiveThirtyEight | April 26 – November 1, 2018 | November 1, 2018 | 49.7% | 30.4% | 19.9% | Cuomo +19.3 |
| Average | | | 51.6% | 33.0% | 15.4% | Cuomo +18.6 |

View source data.

| Poll source | Date(s) administered | Sample size | Margin of error | Andrew Cuomo (D) | Marc Molinaro (R) | Stephanie Miner (SAM) | Howie Hawkins (G) | Larry Sharpe (L) | Other | Undecided |
|---|---|---|---|---|---|---|---|---|---|---|
| Research Co. | November 1–3, 2018 | 450 | ± 4.6% | 54% | 37% | – | – | – | 3% | 6% |
| Siena College | October 28 – November 1, 2018 | 641 | ± 3.9% | 49% | 36% | 2% | 2% | 3% | 0% | 7% |
| Quinnipiac University | October 10–16, 2018 | 852 | ± 4.4% | 58% | 35% | – | – | – | 2% | 5% |
| Gravis Marketing (L-Sharpe) | October 4–8, 2018 | 783 | ± 3.5% | 48% | 25% | 8% | 6% | 13% | – | – |
| Siena College | September 20–27, 2018 | 701 | ± 3.9% | 56% | 38% | – | – | – | 0% | 4% |
| Liberty Opinion Research (R-Reform Party) | August 29–30, 2018 | 2,783 | ± 1.9% | 46% | 43% | – | – | – | – | 11% |
| Quinnipiac University | July 12–16, 2018 | 934 | ± 4.1% | 57% | 31% | – | – | – | 0% | 8% |
| Zogby Analytics | June 27 – July 3, 2018 | 708 | ± 3.7% | 50% | 27% | 10% | 4% | – | – | 9% |
| Zogby Analytics | June 27 – July 3, 2018 | 708 | ± 3.7% | 49% | 27% | 11% | – | – | – | 12% |
| Zogby Analytics | June 27 – July 3, 2018 | 708 | ± 3.7% | 52% | 32% | – | – | – | – | 15% |
| Siena College | June 4–7, 2018 | 745 | ± 3.7% | 56% | 37% | – | – | – | 1% | 5% |
| Quinnipiac University | April 26 – May 1, 2018 | 1,076 | ± 3.7% | 57% | 26% | – | – | – | 2% | 12% |
| Siena College | April 8–12, 2018 | 692 | ± 4.3% | 57% | 31% | – | – | – | 0% | 9% |
| Siena College | March 11–16, 2018 | 772 | ± 4.0% | 57% | 29% | – | – | – | 0% | 11% |

Hypothetical polling

with Cynthia Nixon as WFP nominee

| Poll source | Date(s) administered | Sample size | Margin of error | Andrew Cuomo (D) | Marc Molinaro (R) | Cynthia Nixon (WFP) | Stephanie Miner (SAM) | Howie Hawkins (G) | Larry Sharpe (L) | Other | Undecided |
|---|---|---|---|---|---|---|---|---|---|---|---|
| Siena College | September 20–27, 2018 | 701 | ± 3.9% | 50% | 28% | 10% | 1% | 1% | 2% | 0% | 8% |
| Liberty Opinion Research (R-Reform Party) | August 29–30, 2018 | 2,783 | ± 1.9% | 31% | 30% | 14% | 5% | 5% | 5% | – | 10% |
| Quinnipiac University | July 12–16, 2018 | 934 | ± 4.1% | 43% | 23% | 13% | 1% | 2% | 3% | 1% | 14% |
| Zogby Analytics | June 27 – July 3, 2018 | 708 | ± 3.7% | 44% | 26% | 14% | 6% | 3% | – | – | 7% |
| Gravis Marketing (L-Sharpe) | June 4–7, 2018 | 654 | ± 3.8% | 43% | 15% | 15% | – | 4% | 6% | – | 18% |
| Quinnipiac University | April 26 – May 1, 2018 | 1,076 | ± 3.7% | 40% | 23% | 20% | – | – | – | 0% | 15% |

with Cynthia Nixon as Democratic nominee

| Poll source | Date(s) administered | Sample size | Margin of error | Cynthia Nixon (D) | Marc Molinaro (R) | Other | Undecided |
|---|---|---|---|---|---|---|---|
| Siena College | June 4–7, 2018 | 745 | ± 3.7% | 46% | 35% | 2% | 15% |

with John DeFrancisco

| Poll source | Date(s) administered | Sample size | Margin of error | Andrew Cuomo (D) | John DeFrancisco (R) | Other | Undecided |
|---|---|---|---|---|---|---|---|
| Siena College | April 8–12, 2018 | 692 | ± 4.3% | 56% | 32% | 1% | 9% |
| Siena College | March 11–16, 2018 | 772 | ± 4.0% | 57% | 28% | 1% | 11% |

with Carl Paladino

| Poll source | Date(s) administered | Sample size | Margin of error | Andrew Cuomo (D) | Carl Paladino (R) | Undecided |
|---|---|---|---|---|---|---|
| Marist College | June 6–10, 2017 | 703 | ± 3.7% | 57% | 26% | 17% |

with Rob Astorino

| Poll source | Date(s) administered | Sample size | Margin of error | Andrew Cuomo (D) | Rob Astorino (R) | Undecided |
|---|---|---|---|---|---|---|
| Marist College | June 6–10, 2017 | 703 | ± 3.7% | 58% | 26% | 16% |

with Chris Gibson

| Poll source | Date(s) administered | Sample size | Margin of error | Andrew Cuomo (D) | Chris Gibson (R) | Undecided |
|---|---|---|---|---|---|---|
| Public Policy Polling | April 7–10, 2016 | 1,403 | ± 2.6% | 49% | 26% | 26% |

with Donald Trump Jr.

| Poll source | Date(s) administered | Sample size | Margin of error | Andrew Cuomo (D) | Donald Trump Jr. (R) | Undecided |
|---|---|---|---|---|---|---|
| Marist College | June 6–10, 2017 | 703 | ± 3.7% | 62% | 27% | 11% |

with Harry Wilson

| Poll source | Date(s) administered | Sample size | Margin of error | Andrew Cuomo (D) | Harry Wilson (R) | Undecided |
|---|---|---|---|---|---|---|
| Marist College | June 6–10, 2017 | 703 | ± 3.7% | 58% | 22% | 20% |

=== Fundraising ===
Campaign finance reports as of October 10, 2018
| Candidate | Amount raised |
| Andrew Cuomo | $37,030,713.00 |
| Marc Molinaro | $2,408,077.00 |
| Larry Sharpe | $522,882.00 |
| Stephanie Miner | $725,060.93 |
| Howie Hawkins | $189,918.94 |
Source: New York State Board of Elections

=== Results ===
2018 New York gubernatorial election
| Party | Candidate | Votes | % | ±% |
|---|---|---|---|---|
| Democratic | Andrew Cuomo | 3,424,416 | 56.09% | +8.64% |
| Working Families | Andrew Cuomo | 114,478 | 1.88% | −1.43% |
| Independence | Andrew Cuomo | 68,713 | 1.13% | −0.91% |
| Women's Equality | Andrew Cuomo | 27,733 | 0.45% | −0.96% |
| Total | Andrew Cuomo (incumbent) | 3,635,340 | 59.55% | +5.43% |
| Republican | Marc Molinaro | 1,926,485 | 31.56% | −0.79% |
| Conservative | Marc Molinaro | 253,624 | 4.16% | −2.41% |
| Reform | Marc Molinaro | 27,493 | 0.45% | N/A |
| Total | Marc Molinaro | 2,207,602 | 36.16% | −4.10% |
| Green | Howie Hawkins | 103,946 | 1.70% | −3.14% |
| Libertarian | Larry Sharpe | 95,033 | 1.56% | +1.12% |
| SAM | Stephanie Miner | 55,441 | 0.91% | N/A |
| Write-in | | 7,115 | 0.12% | N/A |
| Total votes | | 6,104,447 | 100.0% | N/A |
| Democratic hold | | | | |

==== By county ====
| County | Andrew Cuomo Democratic | | Marc Molinaro Republican | | Various candidates Other parties | | Margin | | Total votes cast |
| County | # | % | # | % | # | % | # | % | Total votes cast |
|---|---|---|---|---|---|---|---|---|---|
| Albany | 59,692 | 52.3% | 45,917 | 40.2% | 8,612 | 7.5% | 13,775 | 12.1% | 114,221 |
| Allegany | 3,486 | 23.4% | 10,132 | 68.1% | 1,270 | 8.5% | -6,646 | -44.7% | 14,888 |
| Bronx | 260,556 | 90.4% | 23,079 | 8.0% | 4,721 | 1.7% | 237,477 | 82.4% | 288,356 |
| Broome | 31,519 | 43.6% | 36,583 | 50.6% | 4,172 | 5.8% | -5,064 | -6.0% | 72,274 |
| Cattaraugus | 7,034 | 29.8% | 15,028 | 63.6% | 1,563 | 6.6% | -7,994 | -33.8% | 23,625 |
| Cayuga | 9,783 | 36.4% | 14,706 | 54.8% | 2,351 | 8.7% | -4,923 | -18.4% | 26,840 |
| Chautauqua | 15,447 | 35.5% | 25,823 | 59.4% | 2,218 | 5.1% | -10,376 | -23.9% | 43,488 |
| Chemung | 10,191 | 34.3% | 17,294 | 58.2% | 2,238 | 7.5% | -7,103 | -23.9% | 29,723 |
| Chenango | 5,069 | 30.5% | 10,259 | 61.8% | 1,268 | 7.6% | -5,190 | -31.3% | 16,596 |
| Clinton | 11,485 | 43.9% | 13,227 | 50.6% | 1,422 | 5.4% | -1,742 | -6.7% | 26,134 |
| Columbia | 13,665 | 46.7% | 14,253 | 48.7% | 1,351 | 4.7% | -588 | -2.0% | 29,269 |
| Cortland | 6,383 | 39.3% | 7,953 | 49.0% | 1,908 | 11.7% | -1,570 | -9.7% | 16,244 |
| Delaware | 5,796 | 33.8% | 9,934 | 58.0% | 1,396 | 8.1% | -4,138 | -24.2% | 17,126 |
| Dutchess | 51,179 | 45.2% | 59,131 | 52.2% | 3,025 | 2.7% | -7,952 | -7.0% | 113,335 |
| Erie | 174,766 | 51.4% | 150,679 | 44.3% | 14,322 | 4.2% | 24,087 | 7.1% | 339,767 |
| Essex | 6,489 | 46.7% | 6,705 | 48.3% | 687 | 4.9% | -216 | -1.6% | 13,881 |
| Franklin | 5,472 | 39.0% | 7,007 | 49.9% | 1,551 | 11.1% | -1,535 | -10.9% | 14,030 |
| Fulton | 4,080 | 24.2% | 11,901 | 70.7% | 845 | 5.0% | -7,821 | -46.5% | 16,826 |
| Genesee | 5,400 | 25.6% | 13,967 | 66.3% | 1,714 | 8.2% | -8,567 | -30.7% | 21,801 |
| Greene | 6,113 | 31.9% | 12,088 | 63.1% | 969 | 5.0% | -5,975 | -31.2% | 19,170 |
| Hamilton | 722 | 26.0% | 1,792 | 64.5% | 264 | 9.6% | -1,070 | -36.5% | 2,778 |
| Herkimer | 5,924 | 27.2% | 14,374 | 66.1% | 1,455 | 6.7% | -8,450 | -38.9% | 21,753 |
| Jefferson | 8,862 | 29.7% | 19,064 | 63.9% | 1,891 | 6.3% | -10,202 | -34.2% | 29,817 |
| Kings | 524,080 | 82.5% | 84,648 | 13.3% | 26,355 | 4.2% | 439,432 | 67.2% | 635,083 |
| Lewis | 1,854 | 20.5% | 6,553 | 72.4% | 649 | 7.1% | -4,699 | -51.9% | 9,056 |
| Livingston | 7,637 | 31.4% | 14,627 | 60.1% | 2,082 | 8.5% | -6,990 | -28.7% | 24,346 |
| Madison | 9,006 | 34.8% | 10,153 | 56.4% | 2,286 | 8.8% | -5,610 | -21.6% | 25,908 |
| Monroe | 143,110 | 51.1% | 118,909 | 42.4% | 18,247 | 6.5% | 24,201 | 8.7% | 280,266 |
| Montgomery | 4,384 | 28.6% | 10,153 | 66.2% | 804 | 5.3% | -5,769 | -37.6% | 15,341 |
| Nassau | 281,730 | 56.9% | 204,399 | 41.3% | 9,188 | 1.9% | 77,331 | 15.6% | 495,317 |
| New York | 460,368 | 86.2% | 52,677 | 9.9% | 20,954 | 3.9% | 407,691 | 76.3% | 533,999 |
| Niagara | 27,951 | 38.6% | 41,242 | 57.0% | 3,140 | 4.3% | -13,291 | -18.4% | 72,333 |
| Oneida | 27,931 | 35.5% | 44,938 | 57.1% | 5,796 | 7.3% | -17,007 | -21.6% | 78,665 |
| Onondaga | 85,182 | 48.5% | 74,523 | 42.4% | 15,914 | 9.1% | 10,659 | 6.1% | 175,619 |
| Ontario | 16,618 | 38.1% | 23,975 | 54.9% | 3,070 | 7.1% | -7,357 | -16.8% | 43,663 |
| Orange | 56,882 | 46.4% | 60,901 | 49.7% | 4,798 | 3.9% | -4,019 | -3.3% | 122,581 |
| Orleans | 3,082 | 23.9% | 8,893 | 68.9% | 924 | 7.2% | -5,811 | -45.0% | 12,899 |
| Oswego | 11,844 | 30.6% | 23,129 | 59.8% | 3,691 | 9.5% | -11,285 | -29.2% | 38,664 |
| Otsego | 8,151 | 38.4% | 11,592 | 54.7% | 1,460 | 6.9% | -3,441 | -16.3% | 21,203 |
| Putnam | 16,556 | 43.0% | 20,914 | 54.3% | 1,065 | 2.8% | -4,358 | -11.3% | 38,535 |
| Queens | 391,190 | 78.9% | 90,533 | 18.3% | 14,208 | 2.8% | 300,657 | 60.6% | 495,931 |
| Rensselaer | 69,116 | 49.8% | 67,063 | 48.3% | 4,505 | 7.5% | -8,729 | -1.5% | 60,500 |
| Richmond | 69,116 | 49.8% | 67,063 | 48.3% | 2,707 | 2.0% | 2,053 | 1.5% | 138,886 |
| Rockland | 54,436 | 53.8% | 44,020 | 43.5% | 2,749 | 2.7% | 10,416 | 10.3% | 101,205 |
| Saratoga | 37,133 | 39.0% | 52,337 | 54.9% | 5,860 | 6.1% | -15,204 | -15.9% | 95,330 |
| Schenectady | 23,961 | 43.6% | 27,474 | 50.0% | 3,491 | 6.3% | -3,513 | -6.4% | 54,926 |
| Schoharie | 3,099 | 25.4% | 8,190 | 67.0% | 929 | 7.6% | -5,091 | -41.6% | 12,218 |
| Schuyler | 2,414 | 32.7% | 4,024 | 54.5% | 493 | 12.8% | -1,610 | -21.8% | 7,381 |
| Seneca | 41,64 | 35.7% | 6,408 | 55.0% | 1,085 | 9.4% | -2,244 | -20.3% | 11,657 |
| St. Lawrence | 11,376 | 35.0% | 18,632 | 57.3% | 2,491 | 7.7% | -7,256 | -22.3% | 32,499 |
| Steuben | 9,310 | 27.5% | 21,035 | 62.1% | 3,540 | 10.4% | -11,725 | -34.7% | 33,885 |
| Suffolk | 274,518 | 51.4% | 247,169 | 46.3% | 12,069 | 2.2% | 27,349 | 5.1% | 533,756 |
| Sullivan | 10,486 | 42.7% | 12,991 | 52.9% | 1,078 | 4.3% | -2,505 | -10.2% | 24,555 |
| Tioga | 5,978 | 32.7% | 11,045 | 60.4% | 1,264 | 6.9% | -5,067 | -27.7% | 18,287 |
| Tompkins | 24,325 | 65.5% | 8,859 | 23.8% | 3,976 | 10.7% | 15,466 | 41.7% | 37,160 |
| Ulster | 24,325 | 52.6% | 33,509 | 42.6% | 3,752 | 4.8% | 7,891 | 10.0% | 78,661 |
| Warren | 9,815 | 37.6% | 14,745 | 56.5% | 1,548 | 5.9% | -4,930 | -18.9% | 26,108 |
| Washington | 6,411 | 31.2% | 12,879 | 62.8% | 1,232 | 6.0% | -6,468 | -31.6% | 20,522 |
| Wayne | 9,241 | 29.5% | 19,574 | 62.4% | 2,554 | 8.2% | -10,333 | -32.9% | 31,369 |
| Westchester | 222,685 | 66.8% | 102,180 | 30.6% | 8,537 | 2.6% | 120,505 | 36.2% | 333,402 |
| Wyoming | 2,612 | 19.5% | 9,997 | 74.8% | 763 | 5.7% | -7,385 | -55.3% | 13,372 |
| Yates | 2,558 | 31.3% | 4,991 | 61.1% | 618 | 7.6% | -2,433 | -29.8% | 8,167 |
| Totals | 3,635,340 | 59.6% | 2,207,602 | 36.2% | 261,535 | 4.3% | 1,427,738 | 23.4% | 6,104,477 |

Counties that flipped from Democratic to Republican

- Broome (largest municipality: Binghamton)
- Clinton (largest municipality: Plattsburgh)
- Essex (largest municipality: Ticonderoga)
- Franklin (largest municipality: Malone)

Counties that flipped from Republican to Democratic

- Monroe (largest municipality: Rochester)
- Suffolk (largest municipality: Brookhaven)
- Ulster (largest municipality: Kingston)

==== New York City results ====
| 2018 gubernatorial election in New York City | | Manhattan | The Bronx | Brooklyn | Queens | Staten Island | Total | |
| Democratic | Andrew Cuomo | 460,368 | 260,556 | 524,080 | 391,190 | 69,116 | 1,705,310 | 81.5% |
| Democratic | Andrew Cuomo | 86.2% | 90.4% | 82.5% | 78.9% | 49.8% | 1,705,310 | 81.5% |
| Republican | Marc Molinaro | 52,677 | 10,132 | 84,648 | 90,533 | 67,063 | 305,053 | 15.2% |
| Republican | Marc Molinaro | 9.9% | 8.0% | 13.3% | 18.3% | 48.3% | 305,053 | 15.2% |

==== By congressional district ====
Cuomo won 20 of 27 congressional districts, including two held by Republicans. Molinaro won seven, including three that elected Democrats.

| District | Cuomo | Molinaro | Representative |
|---|---|---|---|
| 1st | 49.0% | 48.6% | Lee Zeldin |
| 2nd | 51% | 47% | Peter T. King |
| 3rd | 57% | 41% | Thomas Suozzi |
| 4th | 58% | 40% | Kathleen Rice |
| 5th | 88% | 10% | Gregory Meeks |
| 6th | 69% | 28% | Grace Meng |
| 7th | 86% | 8% | Nydia Velázquez |
| 8th | 87% | 10% | Hakeem Jeffries |
| 9th | 85% | 11% | Yvette Clarke |
| 10th | 80% | 16% | Jerry Nadler |
| 11th | 52% | 46% | Max Rose |
| 12th | 82% | 13% | Carolyn Maloney |
| 13th | 92% | 5% | Adriano Espaillat |
| 14th | 80% | 16% | Alexandria Ocasio Cortez |
| 15th | 95% | 4% | Jose E. Serrano |
| 16th | 77% | 21% | Eliot Engel |
| 17th | 60% | 37% | Nita Lowey |
| 18th | 48% | 49% | Sean Patrick Maloney |
| 19th | 42% | 53% | Antonio Delgado |
| 20th | 47% | 46% | Paul Tonko |
| 21st | 35% | 59% | Elise Stefanik |
| 22nd | 36% | 56% | Anthony Brindisi |
| 23rd | 37% | 54% | Tom Reed |
| 24th | 44% | 47% | John Katko |
| 25th | 52% | 42% | Joe Morelle |
| 26th | 58% | 37% | Brian Higgins |
| 27th | 34% | 61% | Chris Collins |

== Analysis ==
On November 6, 2018, the Cuomo-Hochul ticket defeated the Molinaro-Killian ticket by a margin of 59.6%–36.2%. Cuomo received 3,635,430 votes, making him the top vote-earner in any New York gubernatorial election in history. Cuomo won New York City by 81.5% to Molinaro's 15.2%, meanwhile the rest of the state voted for Cuomo narrowly, as he received 48.10% of the vote to Molinaro's 47.42%. He also prevailed by 10% in Long Island and Rockland County and won Westchester County by 36.2%. This is the last time Richmond County voted Democratic in a statewide election.
