= Carl Person =

American attorney and politician

Carl E. Person
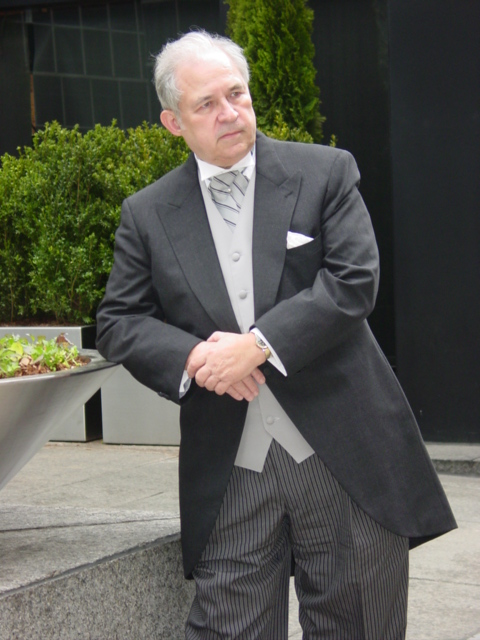
- Born: July 20, 1936 (age 89); New York, New York, US
- Education: Long Island University; Harvard Law School
- Occupation: Attorney
- Political party: Libertarian; Reform

Carl E. Person (pronounced /ˈpir sən/) (born July 20, 1936) is an American attorney and politician. He founded the Paralegal Institute in the early 1970s and played a pivotal role in creating the paralegal field. He has also run unsuccessfully for various political offices. He was a candidate for the 2012 presidential nomination of the Libertarian Party, was the Reform Party nominee for Mayor of New York City in 2013, was the Libertarian nominee for New York State Attorney General in 2010 and was the Libertarian nominee for New York State Attorney General again in 2014.

== Early life ==
Person was born in Manhattan and has lived in New York State most of his life with the exception of 2 years when his family lived in Nebraska and his 3 years of service in the U.S. Army. Person dropped out of Northport High School after his sophomore year, and joined the U.S. Army for a 3-year enlistment. His service included two years on Okinawa as a ship to shore high speed radio operator, to send and receive Morse code. Despite his lack of a high school diploma, Person is a graduate of Long Island University and Harvard Law School.

== Legal career ==
From 1962 to 1968, Person worked as an associate attorney for three New York corporate law firms, including Mudge, Stern, Baldwin & Todd, which accepted Richard M. Nixon as a partner in 1962, shortly after Nixon lost his first bid for the presidency to John F. Kennedy. In 1968, Person started his own law practice, and has been an individual practitioner ever since. Person's law practice from the start has focused on litigation in federal and state courts. His first case, an antitrust action, was brought against General Motors, Ford Motor Company, Chrysler Corporation and others, and lasted 18 years. Person's litigation experience includes civil rights, antitrust, mortgage foreclosure defense, securities fraud, copyright, trademark, age discrimination, price discrimination, employment termination, franchise termination, and other cases in which individuals and/or small businesses have claims against major corporations or government agencies.

In 1972 Person founded the Paralegal Institute and was instrumental in creating the paralegal field.

Person was an early proponent of advertising for lawyers. In the late 1970s, he received media attention for his advocacy of a private court system which would handle civil disputes.

=== Notable cases ===
In 1970, Person commenced his litigation practice by filing an antitrust action on behalf of a group of National Auto Brokers Corp. against General Motors, Ford and Chrysler and 60 other defendants. To help him afford the cost of going up against the leading corporations in America, Person founded the Paralegal Institute in 1972.

Person spent more than 20 years in the practice of intellectual property law. Thirty years after the 1962 doo-wop hit "Why Do Fools Fall in Love" was at the top of the charts, Person recaptured the song's copyright for members of the group The Teenagers in a landmark case. Person represented playwright Mark Dunn in a case against Paramount Pictures alleging that The Truman Show was essentially similar to Frank's Life, which appeared in a New York theatre several years before. In another case, Thee v. Parker Brothers, Inc., Eastern District of New York, Index No. 75–1554, commenced about 15 years after the game "Artifax" was first submitted to Parker Brothers by artist Christian Thee, Person obtained a jury verdict for Thee holding that he had been allegedly defrauded by Parker Brothers' publication of the game "Masterpiece".

When Ralph Anspach invented a game he called "Anti-Monopoly", Parker Brothers charged that it infringed on their copyright and trademark for their game Monopoly, and a lower court agreed. All of Anspach's inventory of his game was dumped in a Minnesota landfill pursuant to court order. Person obtained a reversal in the Ninth Circuit Court of Appeals, and the U.S. Supreme Court upheld this victory when it denied certiorari.

Person has functioned as a private attorney general in several cases, enforcing civil rights and antitrust laws on behalf of individuals and small businesses.

== Political campaigns ==
=== 2010 New York State Attorney General election ===
Person was the Libertarian nominee for New York State Attorney General in 2010. He received 36,488 official votes and finished third out of four candidates on the ballot in that race.

=== 2012 presidential election ===
Person was one of several candidates seeking the Libertarian Party's nomination for the 2012 presidential election. On the first ballot, which was won by former New Mexico Governor Gary Johnson, Person received 3 votes (0.5%)

=== 2013 New York City mayoral election ===
Person was the Reform Party nominee for Mayor of New York City in the 2013 election. He came twelfth out of fifteen candidates with 306 votes.

=== 2014 New York State Attorney General election ===
He was the Libertarian nominee for New York State Attorney General in the 2014 election.

== Electoral History ==
2010 New York Attorney General election results
Party	Candidate	Votes	%
Democratic	Eric Schneiderman	2,478,659	55.78%
Republican	Dan Donovan	1,910,361	43.20%
Libertarian	Carl Person	36,488	0.82%
Freedom	Ramon J. Jimenez	18,021	0.41%
Total votes		4,443,529	100.0%
Democratic hold			

2013 New York City mayoral election
Party	Candidate	Votes	%	±%
Democratic	Bill de Blasio	753,039	69.23%	+25.3%
Working Families	Bill de Blasio	42,640	3.92%	+1.5%
Total	Bill de Blasio	795,679	73.15%	+26.9%
Republican	Joe Lhota	236,212	21.72%	−16.0%
Conservative	Joe Lhota	24,888	2.29%	+0.7%
Taxes 2 High	Joe Lhota	2,500	0.23%	N/A
Students First	Joe Lhota	820	0.08%	N/A
Total	Joe Lhota	264,420	24.31%	−26.4%
Independence	Adolfo Carrion	8,675	0.80%	−12.2%
Green	Anthony Gronowicz	4,983	0.46%	−0.3%
Jobs & Education	Jack Hidary	2,922	0.27%	N/A
Common Sense	Jack Hidary	718	0.07%	N/A
Total	Jack Hidary	3,640	0.33%	N/A
Rent Is Too Damn High	Jimmy McMillan	1,990	0.18%	0.0%
School Choice	Erick Salgado	1,946	0.18%	N/A
Libertarian	Michael Sanchez	1,746	0.16%	+0.1%
Socialist Workers	Dan Fein	758	0.07%	0.0%
Tax Wall Street	Randy Credico	690	0.06%	N/A
Freedom Party	Michael K. Greys	575	0.05%	N/A
Reform	Carl Person	306	0.03%	N/A
Affordable Tomorrow	Joseph Melaragno	289	0.03%	N/A
War Veterans	Sam Sloan	166	0.02%	
Flourish Every Person	Michael J. Dilger	55	0.01%	N/A
Write-in		1,792	0.16%	N/A
Total votes		1,087,710	100.00%	N/A
Democratic gain from Independent		Swing	53.2%	

Attorney General election in New York, 2014
Party	Candidate	Votes	Percentage
Democratic	Eric T. Schneiderman	1,790,006	45.6%
Working Families	Eric T. Schneiderman	169,037	4.3%
Independence/ Women's Equality	Eric T. Schneiderman	110,913	2.8%
Total	Eric T. Schneiderman (incumbent)	2,069,956	52.7%
Republican	John P. Cahill	1,261,641	32.1%
Conservative/ Stop-Common-Core	John P. Cahill	277,349	7.1%
Total	John P. Cahill	1,538,990	39.2%
Green	Ramon Jimenez	80,813	2.1%
Libertarian	Carl E. Person	24,746	0.6%
Blank		207,771	5.3%
Void		1,683	0.04%
Totals		3,924,990	100.00%
Democratic Hold			
