= 2014 New York Attorney General election =

- November 4, 2014
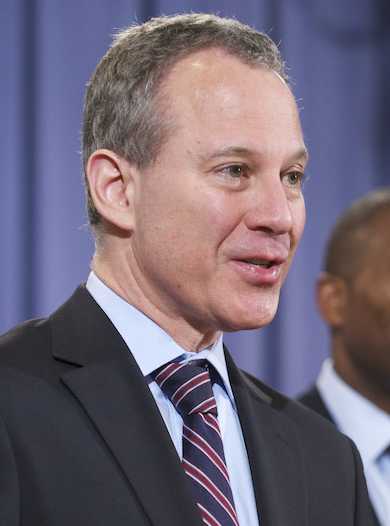

Nominee	Eric Schneiderman	John P. Cahill
Party	Democratic	Republican
Alliance	Working Families	Conservative
Popular vote	2,069,956	1,538,990
Percentage	55.71%	41.42%
- County results Schneiderman: 40–50% 50–60% 60–70% 70–80% 80–90% Cahill: 40–50% 50–60% 60–70% 70–80%
Attorney General before election
Eric Schneiderman
Democratic
Elected Attorney General
Eric Schneiderman
Democratic

The 2014 New York Attorney General election took place on November 4, 2014, to elect the Attorney General of New York. The incumbent Democratic Attorney General Eric Schneiderman won reelection to a second term in office, defeating Republican John P. Cahill.

Incumbent Democratic attorney general Andrew Cuomo declined to run for reelection in 2010, instead successfully running for Governor. State Senator Eric Schneiderman narrowly won the Democratic primary and then won the general election by a wide margin.

In 2014, all statewide offices in New York were held by Democrats. Republicans believed that their best chance of winning a statewide election in 2014 rested on defeating Schneiderman, citing Governor Cuomo's high approval ratings and large campaign war chest and the belief that Comptroller Thomas DiNapoli was unlikely to be vulnerable because "Comptrollers seem to get re-elected as long as they do their jobs." Schneiderman has used his designation as Republicans' "top target" to raise money.

Governing did not believe Schneiderman would be defeated in 2014. A March 2013 article listed the 2014 New York attorney general election as "not competitive", citing the high-profile cases Schneiderman had taken on. A December 2013 article rated the race as "Safe Democratic", stating that "Schneiderman should have no problem winning a second term."

== Democratic primary ==
=== Candidates ===
==== Nominated ====
- Eric Schneiderman, incumbent attorney general

==== Withdrew ====
- Aniello "Neil" Grimaldi (removed from ballot)

== Republican primary ==
=== Candidates ===
==== Nominated ====
- John P. Cahill, attorney and former chief of staff for Governor George Pataki

==== Declined ====
- Michael A. Battle, former Director of the Executive Office for United States Attorneys and former United States Attorney for the Western District of New York
- Daniel M. Donovan, Jr., District Attorney of Richmond County and nominee for Attorney General in 2010
- Michael J. Garcia, former United States Attorney for the Southern District of New York
- Randy Mastro, attorney and former chief of staff to Rudy Giuliani
- Marc Mukasey, attorney and stepson of former United States Attorney General Michael Mukasey
- Dennis Vacco, former attorney general

== Major third parties ==
Besides the Democratic and Republican parties, the Conservative, Green, Independence and Working Families parties all enjoyed automatic ballot access as qualified New York parties in 2014.

=== Conservative ===
==== Candidates ====
===== Nominated =====
- John P. Cahill, Republican nominee

=== Green ===
==== Candidates ====
===== Nominated =====
- Ramon Jimenez, attorney from The Bronx

=== Independence ===
==== Candidates ====
===== Nominated =====
- Eric Schneiderman, incumbent attorney general

=== Working Families ===
==== Candidates ====
===== Nominated =====
- Eric Schneiderman, incumbent attorney general

== Minor third parties ==
Any political party other than the six qualified New York parties (Democratic, Republican, Conservative, Green, Independence and Working Families) was required to petition their way onto the ballot.

=== Libertarian ===
==== Candidates ====
===== Nominated =====
- Carl Person, nominee for Attorney General in 2010, candidate for President of the United States in 2012 and Reform Party nominee for Mayor of New York City in 2013

=== Stop Common Core ===
==== Candidates ====
===== Nominated =====
- John P. Cahill, Republican nominee

=== Women's Equality ===
==== Candidates ====
===== Nominated =====
- Eric Schneiderman, incumbent attorney general

== General election ==
=== Polling ===
Poll source	Date(s) administered	Sample size	Margin of error	Eric Schneiderman (D)	John P. Cahill (R)	Other	Undecided
Siena College	October 16–20, 2014	748	± 3.6%	55%	35%	0%	10%
Siena College	September 18–23, 2014	809	± 3.4%	50%	34%	—	15%
In The Field◆	September 8, 2014	600	± 4%	36.8%	29.7%	—	33.5%
Quinnipiac University	August 14–17, 2014	1,034	± 3.1%	51%	29%	1%	19%
Siena College	July 13–16, 2014	774	± 3.5%	53%	31%	0%	16%
Siena College	June 8–12, 2014	835	± 3.4%	52%	27%	0%	22%
Quinnipiac University	May 14–19, 2014	1,129	± 2.9%	46%	27%	1%	25%

◆ Internally-conducted poll for the John P. Cahill campaign that he was required by state law to publish after parts of the poll were revealed in a fundraising appeal.

=== Results ===
Attorney General election in New York, 2014
Party	Candidate	Votes	Percentage
Democratic	Eric T. Schneiderman	1,790,006	48.18%
Working Families	Eric T. Schneiderman	169,037	4.55%
Independence/ Women's Equality	Eric T. Schneiderman	110,913	2.99%
Total	Eric T. Schneiderman (incumbent)	2,069,956	55.71%
Republican	John P. Cahill	1,261,641	33.96%
Conservative/ Stop-Common-Core	John P. Cahill	277,349	7.46%
Total	John P. Cahill	1,538,990	41.42%
Green	Ramon Jimenez	80,813	2.18%
Libertarian	Carl E. Person	24,746	0.67%
Write-ins		1,031	0.03%
Totals		3,715,536	100.00%
Democratic Hold			
