= Reform Party of New York State =

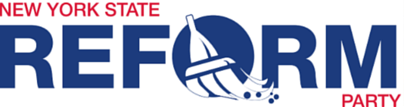
- Chairperson: Leigh S. Pollet
- Founded: 2000
- Headquarters: Bohemia, New York
- Ideology: Populism; Radical centrism Electoral reform
- Political position: Center
- National affiliation: Reform Party of the United States of America
- New York State Assembly: 0 / 150
- New York State Senate: 0 / 63
- New York City Council: 0 / 51
- Other elected offices: 8 (as of 2022)

Website
- reformpartyny.org

The Reform Party of New York State was the New York branch of the Reform Party of the United States of America. The branch was founded in 2000 after the Independence Party of New York, which had been affiliated with the national Reform Party from 1994 to 2000, severed ties with the national party.

A statewide ballot-access party bearing the Reform Party name, which had a sometimes contentious relationship with the national party, existed from 2015 to 2018. It was originally named the Stop Common Core party, referring to the common core educational curriculum. Aside from this period, the party has had limited operations in the state, never qualifying for ballot access in its own right and mainly running candidates in multiple number of local elections including that of Mayor of New York City and many state legislators. Leigh S. Pollet is chair of the party.

== Branch of the national Reform Party ==
The national Reform Party was affiliated with the Independence Party of New York from 1996 to 2000, during which time Jack Essenberg was the chair of the Independence Party, but they disaffiliated in 2000. The national Reform Party has had a state branch in New York since 2007. It did not run any statewide candidates in races between 2007 and 2014, but did get multiple candidates onto the ballot in local elections, most prominently Carl Person, who ran under the Reform Party banner in the 2013 New York City mayoral election.

The national Reform Party claims five elected officials in the state, three of whom are in Rockland County: one county legislator (Charles J. Falciglia, who is registered as a Republican) and two trustees of the village of Suffern. The other two are the town supervisor and a trustee for the town of Lake George.

== 2015–2018 ballot-qualified party ==
In 2014, Rob Astorino, the Republican Party's nominee in that year's gubernatorial election, petitioned to create the Stop Common Core Party, a single-issue ballot line designed to declare opposition to the Common Core State Standards Initiative and act as a counterweight to the Women's Equality Party, a new party similarly created by Astorino's Democratic opponent, Andrew Cuomo. Under New York State Law, the Stop Common Core Party would qualify to automatically appear on the ballot for every election through 2018 if it received at least 50,000 votes in the gubernatorial election, a threshold it narrowly achieved despite Astorino's overall loss.

On February 17, 2015, Astorino announced he would change the name of the party to the "Reform Party" to broaden its appeal beyond a single issue and received permission from Bill Merrell, National Reform Party Chair, under an agreement to operate under the rules of the national Reform Party. The party initially ran into opposition from the Conservative Party of New York State, who balked at allowing another ballot line to cross-endorse its candidates. Marie Smith became the chairperson of the state Reform Party.

The national Reform Party lost control of the state party in September 2016 when Curtis Sliwa and Frank Morano led a hostile takeover of the party, installing Sliwa as chairman. Merrell sued to invalidate this takeover, alleging a violation of national guidelines and trademark infringement, but lost due to technical grounds. The original decision from Albany-based Supreme Court Justice Christina Ryba dismissed this suit.

National Reform Party presidential candidate Rocky De La Fuente was not on the New York party line and ran in New York State as a write-in candidate in 2016. No candidate appeared on the state Reform Party's presidential ballot, as the national party had failed to secure ballot access for De La Fuente before the deadline, which came before Sliwa's hostile takeover. The ballot-qualified independent Reform Party endorsed perennial candidate Sal Albanese in the 2017 New York City mayoral election and Ben Walsh in the 2017 Syracuse mayoral election. Walsh won, despite not having the endorsement of either the Democratic or Republican Parties (running only on a fusion ticket alongside the Independence Party of New York).

For the 2018 gubernatorial election, Sliwa's Reform Party considered multiple candidates, including cross-endorsements with potential Republican nominees or with the Libertarian Party of New York, or nominating their own candidate. (Joel Giambra had spoken of his interest in the Reform Party line). The party executive committee deadlocked between Giambra and presumptive Republican nominee Marc Molinaro in April. At the party convention on May 19, the party nominated Molinaro and running mate Julie Killian as the gubernatorial ticket, incumbent Democrat Thomas DiNapoli for Comptroller, and offered former U.S. Attorney Preet Bharara the attorney general nomination, which he did not accept; Sliwa's wife Nancy, running on a single-issue animal rights platform, then defeated two challengers (Mike Diederich and Libertarian nominee Christopher Garvey) in an open primary to secure the attorney general nomination. The independent Reform Party under Curtis Sliwa finished last among all parties on the ballot in the 2018, far short of the 50,000 votes needed to maintain ballot access. Sliwa rejoined the Republican Party as part of his campaign in the 2021 New York City mayoral election. Sliwa lost the mayoral election and did not receive support from the NYS Reform Party. Bill Merrell took control of the New York State Reform Party over after Sliwa's poor showing in the 2018 elections. In 2018, Bill Merrell was again elected State Chair of the New York Reform Party.

As of February 2019, approximately 400 persons were still registered as members of the "Reform Party" with the New York State Board of Elections.

Sliwa again ran for mayor of New York in the 2025 elections under a third party line in addition to the Republican nomination, with the third party line named the "Protect Animals" line. The Reform Party endorsed independent mayoral candidate Joseph Hernandez.
