= Libertarian Party of New York =

State affiliate of the Libertarian Party

- Chairperson: Catrina Rocco
- Vice Chairperson: Daniel Castello
- Secretary: Andrew Kolstee
- Treasurer: Chance Haywood
- Founded: 1973
- Headquarters: Albany, New York
- Membership (March 2021): ▼20,298
- Ideology: Libertarianism
- National affiliation: Libertarian Party
- Colors: A dark shade of grey or blue; golden yellow
- New York State Assembly: 0 / 150
- New York State Senate: 0 / 63
- New York City Council: 0 / 51
- U.S. Senate (New York): 0 / 2
- U.S. House of Representatives (New York): 0 / 26
- Other elected officials: 0 (June 2024)

Website
- lpny.org/

The Libertarian Party of New York (LPNY; also known as the Free Libertarian Party of New York) is the affiliate of the Libertarian Party in the U.S. state of New York. Due to changes in New York State election law in 2020, the Libertarian Party lost its ballot status. It is the recognized affiliate of the national Libertarian Party.

The Libertarian Party of New York is dedicated to the principle that free people have the right to live the way they please, except to initiate force, the threat of force, or fraud, against other persons or their property.

== History ==
The Libertarian Party was founded in 1971 on the libertarian principle: that people should be free to do whatever they wish, except to initiate force, the threat of force, or fraud against others or their property. The principle does not preclude retaliatory force, as in the redress of wrongs through courts, and as in the traditional common law of self-defense. National Libertarian Party members, including the New York members, have paid $25 per year, and have as a condition of membership signified: "I certify that I do not believe in or advocate the initiation of force as a means of achieving political or social goals."

The Libertarian Party of New York was founded as an unregistered political party in 1970 by Paul and Michael Gilson who became its first people in public office the next year on election to a zoning board in Upstate New York. It helped drive the creation of a national party, and was re-organized in 1972 by a group now centered around Ed Clark, later the Libertarian Party presidential candidate. Its name was changed to the "Free Libertarian Party" when the New York Board of Elections ruled that the name Libertarian Party would confuse voters with the Liberal Party of New York. However, the Board of Elections eventually allowed the name "Libertarian Party" to be used. The Statue of Liberty is their ballot symbol, and they now appear on the ballot as the Libertarian Party.

Since 1974, the Libertarian Party of New York has had a candidate for Governor of New York on the ballot every four years except for 1986, the only party in New York State without official ballot status up to that point to do so. Several other minor parties in New York have achieved ballot status through electoral fusion, endorsing the candidate of a major party. The Libertarian Party of New York declined to achieve ballot status by this means, although Republican William Weld flirted with the LPNY gubernatorial nomination in 2006.

In 2018, Larry Sharpe, the Libertarian Party nominee for governor that year, finished with over 90,000 votes, the most in the state party's history for a gubernatorial candidate. By surpassing 50,000 votes, the Libertarian Party had achieved qualified party status, and ballot access, for the first time in its history. The party's membership jumped 25 percent after the qualification. However, the Libertarian Party lost its ballot status line in 2020 due to a change in New York State election law that is still under litigation.

== Ballot access ==
After it first received write-in votes in 1972 for presidential candidate John Hospers and vice presidential candidate Tonie Nathan (The first female candidate for Vice President to receive an electoral vote), the LPNY has obtained at least 15,000 petition signatures and placed statewide candidates on the ballot in every statewide election between 1974 and 2016, except 1986. These signatures were, by law, collected in a six-week period in mid-July to August (except in 1994, see Schulz v. Williams, 44 F.3d 48 (2d Cir. 1994)).

In the gubernatorial elections, Libertarian candidates included a full slate of the possible statewide candidates: Governor, Lieutenant Governor, Attorney General, Comptroller, and, when one is up for election: Senator. In the Presidential races, candidates included the full number of Electors for President and Vice President, and when one is up for election, Senator. This regular achievement of statewide ballot status by a full slate of candidates for 42 years indicates substantial support in New York State. Under the change in New York State election law, the Libertarian Party lost its status as one of the Qualified New York political parties. Nationally, the Libertarian Party has 208,456 voters registered by the respective state boards of election.

== Leadership ==
The officers of the Libertarian Party of New York are elected annually. In 2018, the party become a ballot-recognized party, and a political entity was created that is recognized under election law. Therefore, the party is current going through a transition as it works to restructure. The officers of both entities are listed.

Position	Name
Chair	Catrina Rocco
Vice-Chair	Daniel Castello
Secretary	Andrew Kolstee
Treasurer	Chance Haywood
Communications Director	Christopher Skelly
Fundraising Director	Paul Grindle
IT Director	Devin Balkind
Legislative Affairs Director	Christian Padgett
Outreach Director	Duane Whitmer
Political Director	Richard Purtell
Volunteer Director	Pietro Geraci

=== Past leadership ===
Past Officers
Chair	Vice Chair	Secretary	Treasurer
Edward E. "Ed" Clark (1972); Jerome J. Klasman (1972–1973); Andrea Millen (1973–1974); Raymond Strong (1974–1975); Gary Greenberg (1975–1976); John Deane (1976); Ann Weill (1976–1977); Carl Hastings (1977–1978); Thomas Frederick (1978); Charles Steber (1978–1979); Gary Greenberg (1979–1983); John Francis (1983–1985); Bill McMillen (1985–1989); Norma Segal (1989–1990); Fran Poretto (1990); Kevin Delany (1990–1991); W. Gary Johnson (1991–1992); Ludwig Vogel (1992–1994); Gail Bova (1994–1995); Blay Tarnoff (1995–1996); Lloyd Wright (1996–1998); Jim Harris (1998–1999); David Harnett (1999–2000); Richard Cooper (2000–2002); Albert Dedicke (2002); Jak Karako (2002–2003); John Clifton (2003–2006); Richard Cooper (2006–2007); Jeff Russell (2007–2008); Eric Sundwell (2008–2009); Chris Edes (2009–2010); Mark Axinn (2010–2015); Mark Glogowski (2015–2018); Jim Rosenbeck (2018–2020); Anthony D'Orazio (2020); W. Cody Anderson (2020–2022); Andrew Kolstee (2022–2024); Duane Whitmer (2024–2026)	Howie Rich (1973–1974); Raymond Strong (1973–1974); Bill Lawry (1974–1975); Mike Nichols (1974–1975); Charles Blood (1975–1976); Susan Corkery (1975–1976); Don Feder (1976); Ann Weill (1976); Carl Hastings (1976–1977); Roger Eisenberg (1976–?); Michael Kessler (1977–?); Carolyn Keelen (1977–?); Charles Steber (1978–1983); Robert Cassella (1978–1979); Jesse Cardillo (1979–1981); Jorge Cordina (1981–1982); Judith Jones (1982–1983); Dottie-Lou Brokaw (1983–1986); Reed Halstead (1983–1984); Bill McMillen (1984–1985); Tom Lowry (1985–1986); Dottie-Lou Brokaw (1987–1988); Tom Lowry (1987–1988); Fran Porretto (1989–1990); Kevin Delaney (1990–1991); Douglas Greene (1990–1991); Dottie-Lou Brokaw (1991–1993); Joseph Brennan (1992–1995); Dottie-Lou Brokaw (1994–1997); Jim Harris (1995–1996); Audrey Capozzi (1996–2002); Blay Tarnoff (1997–2002); Jak Karako (2002); Vince O'Neill (2002–2003); Bonnie Scott (2003–2004); Thomas Ruks (2003–2004); Richard Cooper (2004–2005); Stephen Healy (2004–2005); Bonnie Scott (2005–2006); Thomas Ruks (2005–2006); M Carling (2006–2008); Joseph Dobrian (2006–2007); Chris Garvey (2007–2008); Mark Axinn (2008–2010); Chris Edes (2008–2009); Joseph Dobrian (2009–2010); Audrey Capozzi (2010–2013); Donald Silberger (2010–2011); Richard Cooper (2011–2012); Chris Padgett (2012–2016); Gigi Bowman (2012–2013); Phil Ricci (2014–2015); Jim Rosenbeck (2015–2018); Brian Waddell (2016–2019); Shawn Hannon (2017–2019); Tucker Coburn (2019–2020); Anthony D'Orazio (2019–2020); Steve Minogue (2020); Anthony D'Orazio (2020–2022); Duane Whitmer (2020–2024); Rich Purtell (2022–2024)	Mike Nichols (1973–1974); Lee Schubert (1974–1975); Murrell de France (1975); Martin E. Nixon (1975–1976); Louis J. Sicilia (1977–1978); Fred Cookinham (1978–1980); Carol Moore (1980–1981); Charles Kiessling (1982–1983); Christine Gopalan (1984); Dawn Davis (1984–1986; 1987–88); Wheatley Bergen (1988–1989); John Karr (1989–1990); Martin Solomon (1990–1991); Gail Bova (1992–1994); Lloyd Wright (1994–1996); Eric Gruber (1996–1997); David Harnett (1997–1998); Caryn Cohen (1998–2002); Bonnie Scott (2002–2003); Catherine Ruks (2003–2004); Bonnie Scott (2004–2005); Blay Tarnoff (2005–2007); Joseph Dobrian (2007–2009); M Carling (2009–2010); Brian DeMarzo (2010–2011); Blay Tarnoff (2011–2019); Fred Cole (2019–2020); Andrew Kolstee (2020–2022); Mark Braiman (2022–2024)	Jerome J. Klasman (1973–1974); Dolores Grande (1974–1976); Peter Wilson (1976–1978); Wilbur Wong (1978–1980); Ira Gottlieb (1980–1983); Bill Stocker (1983–1991); Steve LaBianca (1992–1993); Pam Haberkorn (1993–1994); Audrey Capozzi (1994–1996); Jim Harris (1996–1998); John Ayling (1998–1999); John Clifton (1999–2002); Bill McMillen (2002–2003); Werner Hetzer (2003–2006); Gary Popkin (2006–2009); Sean Sherman (2009–2010); Gary Triestman (2010–2016); Mike Dowden (2016–2019); Cruger Gallaudet (2019); Lora Newell (2019–2022); W. Cody Anderson (2022–2024)

== Listed local affiliates ==
The Libertarian Party of New York contains local county affiliates, each of which is administered by its own local Libertarian Party. County officers are elected in accordance with their rules.

County	Website	Chair
Chautauqua	Chautauqua County Libertarian Party	Andrew Kolstee
Chemung		Nick Grasso
Columbia	Columbia County Libertarian Party	Scott Hoskins
Dutchess		Robert Cocomello
Erie	Erie County Libertarian Party	Duane Whitmer
Kings (Brooklyn)	Libertarian Party of Brooklyn	Christopher Skelly
Madison		Mark Braiman
Monroe	Monroe County Libertarian Party	Steven Becker
Nassau	Nassau County Libertarian Party	Blay Tarnoff; Jonathan Gunther
New York (Manhattan)	Libertarian Party of Manhattan	Chance Haywood
Oneida		Keith Redhead
Onondaga	Onondaga County Libertarian Party	Rachel Becker
Queens	Libertarian Party of Queens	John Clifton
Richmond (Staten Island)	Libertarian Party of Staten Island	Susan Overeem-Cummings
Saratoga		Naz Garabedian
Suffolk	Suffolk County Libertarian Party	Robert Schuon
Ulster	Ulster County Libertarian Party	Sam Kniffen
Wayne		Jim Dayton
Westchester-Putnam		Rajib Maitra

=== Manhattan Libertarian Party ===
The Manhattan Libertarian Party (MLP) is a chapter of the Libertarian Party of New York established in 2000.

The Manhattan LP was the host chapter of the 2012 Libertarian Party of New York convention, held January 21, 2012. The convention was attended by several candidates seeking the national Libertarian Party's presidential nomination, including former New Mexico governor Gary Johnson and New York attorney Carl E. Person.

==== Candidates endorsed in the 2008 election endorsed by MLP ====
- Bob Barr for President of the United States
- Isaiah Matos for US Congress, New York's 14th congressional district
- Susan Overeem for US Congress, New York's 13th congressional district
- Bill Buran for New York State Assembly District 72
- Nic Leobold for New York State Assembly District 66

Sam Sloan and the Manhattan madam Kristin M. Davis both sought the Libertarian Party nomination for Governor of New York State. Andrew Clunn sought to be nominated for Lieutenant Governor, Carl Person sought the nomination for Attorney General. John Clifton sought the nomination for US Senate, and Michel Faulkner sought the nomination for US Congress from the 15th Congressional District previously held by Charles Rangel.

=== Libertarian Party of Queens County ===
The Libertarian Party of Queens County, formerly known as the "Queens Libertarian Party" led by Tom Stevens (politician), is the local affiliate of the LPNY for the Queens county-borough in the City of New York. The chapter was known for whipping up candidates for public office until 2010 when Blay Tarnoff hijacked the party and passed a surprise motion to decertify the chapter.

In December 2016, the LPNY State Committee voted to de-charter the chapter. Shortly thereafter, a small group of former Democrats and two former Republicans chartered the chapter under a new name. The "Libertarian Party of Queens County", or LPQC for short, was chaired by Elliot Axelman for its first 8 months. Axelman is a radio host, certified Paramedic and former Lieutenant for Whitestone Volunteer Ambulance Corps. In October 2017, Axelman resigned following a move to New Hampshire. His Vice Chair, Christopher Fuentes-Padilla, took over until November 19, 2017.

==== Accolades ====
The Queens Chapter is the first chapter in the history of the LPNY to elect a Chair under the age of 24. Christopher Fuentes-Padilla, the former Vice Chair, was sworn in as Chairman at age 20 on November 20, 2017.

Padilla is also the first Hispanic to hold the Office in Queens and the first Puerto Rican male to hold office in the LPNY.

=== Suffolk County Libertarian Party ===
The Suffolk County Libertarian Party (formerly "SCLO") is a chapter of the Libertarian Party of New York established in 1974.

== Vote totals for Libertarian candidates in New York ==
=== State elections ===
==== Governor ====
Year	Candidate	Votes	%
1974	Jerome Tuccille / Louis J. Sicilia	10,503	0.2%
1978	Gary Greenberg / James Franz	18,990	0.4%
1982	John Northrup / David Hoesly	16,913	0.3%
1990	W. Gary Johnson / Dottie-Lou Brokaw	24,611	0.6%
1994	Robert Schulz / Stan Dworkin	9,506	0.2%
1998	Christopher B. Garvey / Donald Silberger	4,722	0.1%
2002	Scott Jeffrey / Jay Greco	5,013	0.1%
2006	John Clifton / Donald Silberger	15,068	0.3%
2010	Warren Redlich / Alden Link	48,386	1.1%
2014	Michael McDermott / Chris Edes	15,209	0.4%
2018	Larry Sharpe / Andrew Hollister	95,033	1.6%
2022	Larry Sharpe / Andrew Hollister	Not on ballot	Not on ballot
2026	None of the Above / None of the Above	Not on ballot	Not on ballot

==== Attorney General ====
Year	Candidate	Votes	%
1974	Leland W. Schubert		
1978	Delores Grande		
1990	Margaret M. Fries		
1998	Daniel A. Conti	19,864	0.5%
2002	Daniel A. Conti	23,213	0.6%
2006	Christopher Garvey	29,413	0.7%
2010	Carl Person	36,488	0.8%
2014	Carl Person	23,586	0.6%
2018	Christopher Garvey	41,183	0.7%
2022	Sean Hayes	Not on ballot	Not on ballot

==== Comptroller ====
Year	Candidate	Votes
1974	Robert S. Flanzer	
1982	William P. McMillen	
1990	Vicki Kirkland	
2002	James Eisert	19,235
2006	John J. Cain	38,483
2010	John Gaetani	27,898
2014	John Clifton	36,583
2018	Cruger Gallaudet	32,353
2022	William Schmidt	Not on ballot

=== Federal elections ===
==== U.S. Senate ====
Year	Candidate	Votes	%
1980	Richard Savadel	21,465	0.4%
1992	Norma Segal	108,530	1.7%
1994	Norma Segal	17,991	0.4%
1998	William P. McMillen	8,223	0.2%
2000	John Clifton	4,734	0.8%
2004	Donald Silberger	19,093	0.3%
2006	Jeff Russell	15,929	0.5%
2010	Randy Credico	25,975^^ (Note: Includes votes Credico earned on the Anti-Prohibition Party line. It is impossible to determine separate vote tallies for each line due to the fact that some jurisdictions conflated both of Credico's ballot lines onto one space on the ballot.)	0.5%
2010 (Note: Special election.)	John Clifton	17,872	0.4%
2012	Chris Edes	31,980	0.5%
2016	Alex Merced	43,856	0.6%
2018	Aaron Commey	Not on ballot	Not on ballot
2022	Thomas Quiter	Not on ballot	Not on ballot

==== U.S. President ====
Year	Candidate	Votes	%
1972	John Hospers / Tonie Nathan	6	0.0%
1976	Roger MacBride / David Bergland	12,197	0.2%
1980	Ed Clark / David Koch	52,648	0.9%
1984	David Bergland / Jim Lewis	11,949	0.2%
1988	Ron Paul / Andre Marrou	12,109	0.2%
1992	Andre Marrou / Nancy Lord	13,451	0.2%
1996	Harry Browne / Jo Jorgensen	12,220	0.2%
2000	Harry Browne / Art Olivier	7,649	0.1%
2004	Michael Badnarik / Richard Campagna	11,607	0.2%
2008	Bob Barr / Wayne Root	19,513	0.3%
2012	Gary Johnson / Jim Gray	47,229	0.7%
2016	Gary Johnson / Bill Weld	161,836	2.3%
2020	Jo Jorgensen / Spike Cohen	60,234	0.7%
2024	Chase Oliver / Mike ter Maat	5,338	0.06%

Chase Oliver was a registered write-in candidate, since the party was unable to successfully petition to get on the ballot.

== Current officeholders ==
As of September 19, 2020:

- Debra Altman – New York City Education Council, District 75
- Michael Becallo – Cicero Town Councilor
- Nick Grasso – Elmira City Council, District 1
- Mark Grozio – Niagara County Legislator, District 3
- Ryan Sanders – Sherman Village Board
- Michael Korchak – Broome County District Attorney
- Brandon Lyon – Johnstown Water Board
- Michael Paestella – Minetto Town Council
- Jame VanDewalker – Allen Town Clerk
- Keith Readhed - Ava Town Supervisor
- Kathleen Readhed - Ava Town Tax Collector
