= 2012 Libertarian National Convention =

- 2012 presidential election
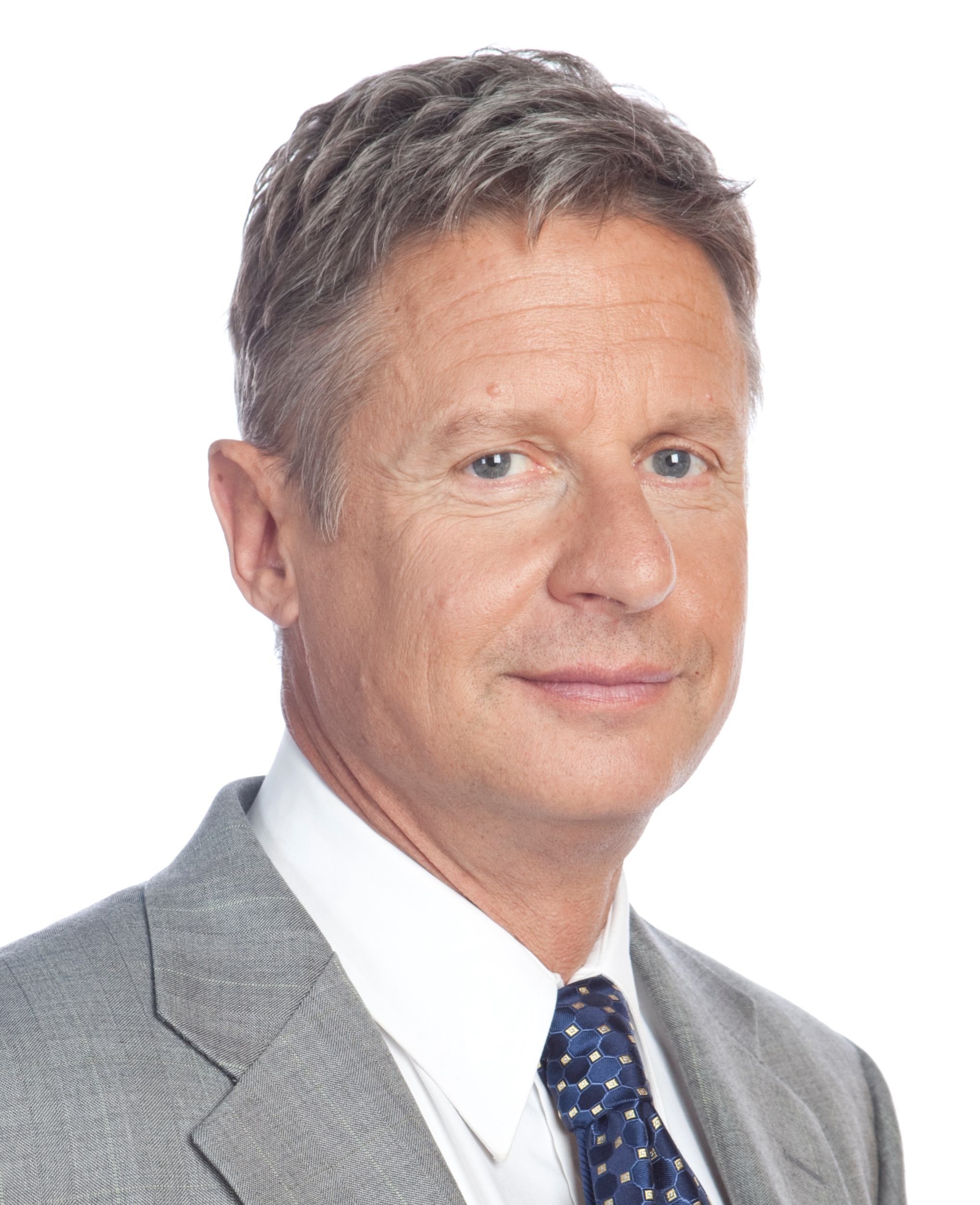
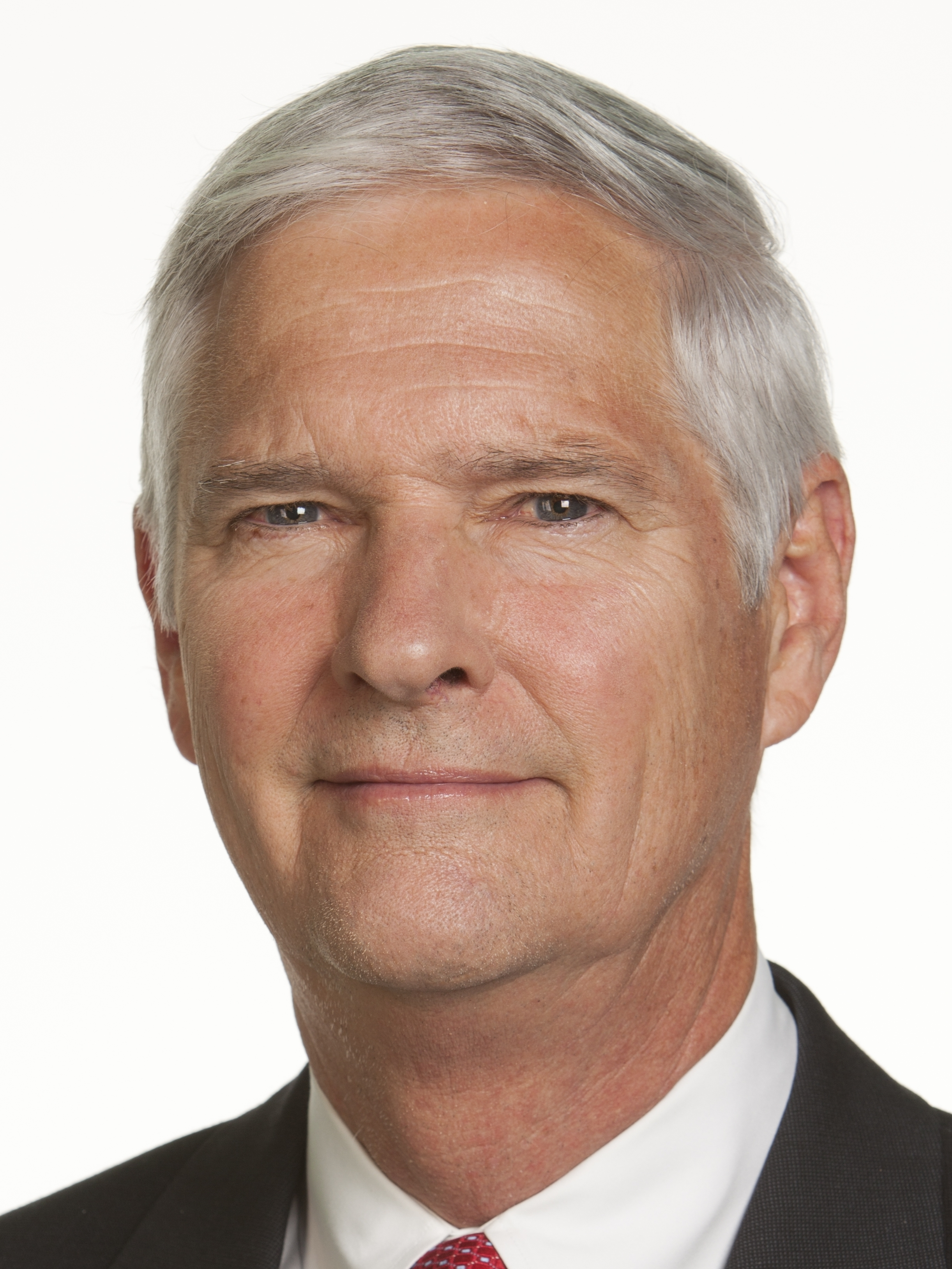
- Nominees; Johnson and Gray

Convention
- Dates: May 2–6, 2012
- City: Las Vegas, Nevada
- Venue: Red Rock Resort Spa and Casino
- Chair: Ruth Bennett (WA)
- Keynote speaker: Michael Cloud
- Notable speakers: Theodora "Tonie" Nathan; Edward Clark; Mary Ruwart

Candidates
- Presidential nominee: Gary Johnson of New Mexico
- Vice-presidential nominee: Jim Gray of California
- Other candidates: R. Lee Wrights (TX); Jim Burns (NV); Carl Person (NY); Sam Sloan (NY)

Voting
- Total delegates: 593
- Votes needed for nomination: 297

Sites of the 2012 national party conventions.

The 2012 Libertarian National Convention, in which delegates of the Libertarian Party (LP) chose the party's nominees for president and vice president in the 2012 general election, was held May 2–6, 2012, in Las Vegas, Nevada, at the Red Rock Resort Spa and Casino. Former Governor of New Mexico Gary Johnson won the presidential nomination on the first ballot. Retired California state court judge Jim Gray won the vice presidential nomination, also on the first ballot. The convention also chose to replace most of the Libertarian National Committee party officers and members-at-large.

The theme of this convention was Liberty Will Win.

Several non-binding advisory primaries were held ahead of the convention as part of the 2012 Libertarian Party presidential primaries.

== Host selection ==
This was the first presidential nominating convention ever held in the Las Vegas Valley. Other cities that bid to host the convention included Dallas, Texas, and San Francisco, California.

== Candidates debate ==
In February 2012, Gary Johnson, Lee Wrights, Bill Still, Carl Person, and Leroy Saunders participated in a debate held by the Libertarian Party of Florida and moderated by LPUSA Chair Mark Hinkle. The debate participants were selected by convention delegates in a secret ballot, in which a candidate needed to score 10 percent of the vote or higher to be allowed to take part. Libertarian candidates in the debate called for ending government interference in personal, family and business decisions; much lower government spending; deregulation; lower taxes; a currency free of government manipulation; free trade; and a peaceful, non-interventionist foreign policy.

== Schedule ==
The convention covered five days over May 2–6. The business of deciding the national platform and candidates formally began on May 3, and a second candidate debate was held on May 4. On May 5, the party nominated Gary Johnson as its presidential candidate and Jim Gray as vice presidential candidate. On May 6, elections for the Libertarian National Committee concluded.

Candidates for the presidential nomination were required to gather "tokens" from delegates. 53 tokens were required to participate in debates, while 30 were needed to be listed on the ballot.

== Convention speakers ==
Speakers at the convention included:

- Norma Jean Almodovar – Sex worker activist and former LAPD cop, LP candidate for Lieutenant Governor of California
- David Bergland – 1984 LP presidential nominee
- Judge John Buttrick – Superior Court Judge of Maricopa County, Arizona
- Alicia Garcia Clark – National Libertarian National Committee (LNC) leader from 1981 to 1983
- Ed Clark – 1980 LP presidential nominee
- Michael Cloud – Author, Secrets of Libertarian Persuasion, who ran for U.S. Senate in Massachusetts in 2002
- Sharon Harris – President of Advocates for Self-Government
- Carla Howell – Executive Director of the Libertarian Party; 2000 LP nominee for the U.S. Senate in Massachusetts, 2002 LP nominee for Governor of Massachusetts
- Manny Klausner – Co-founder of the Reason Foundation, and former editor of Reason magazine
- Nancy Lord – 1992 LP vice-presidential nominee
- Tibor Machan – Professor of philosophy at Auburn University
- Tonie Nathan – 1972 LP vice-presidential nominee, and first woman in U.S. History to receive an electoral vote
- Robert Poole – Co-founder of Reason magazine
- Mary Ruwart – Research scientist and former contender for the Libertarian Party presidential nomination

== Presidential candidates ==
Libertarian Party presidential candidates, 2012
Candidate	Home state	Profession	Campaign
Jim Burns	Nevada		
Jim Duensing	Nevada	2012 Boston Tea Party presidential nominee (nominated at their March 30 convention)	
R. J. Harris	Oklahoma	United States Army National Guard	(campaign)
Gary Johnson	New Mexico	Governor of New Mexico (1995–2003)	(campaign • positions • website)
Carl Person	New York	Attorney	(campaign)
Sam Sloan	New York	Member of the executive board of the United States Chess Federation (2006) Manhattan Libertarian Party County Committee Director of Media Relations (2006–2007)	(campaign)
R. Lee Wrights	Texas	Vice chair of the Libertarian National Committee (2004–2006)	(campaign)

== Presidential delegate count ==
2012 Libertarian National Convention presidential vote
Candidate	first ballot	Percentage
Gary Johnson	419	70.4%
R. Lee Wrights	152	25.6%
Jim Burns	12	2.0%
Carl Person	3	0.5%
NOTA	3	0.5%
Sam Sloan (write-in)	2	0.3%
Max Abramson (write-in)	2	0.3%
Ron Paul (write-in)	1	0.2%
Wayne Allyn Root (write-in)	1	0.2%
Totals	595	100%

2012 Libertarian National Convention vice-presidential vote
Candidate	first ballot	Percentage
Jim Gray	357	59.5%
R. Lee Wrights	229	38.2%
NOTA	7	1.2%
Jim Burns	6	1.0%
Sam Sloan (write-in)	1	0.2%
Totals	600	100%

== Libertarian National Committee elections ==
The 2012 Libertarian National Convention saw a two-day election of officers and members-at-large of the Libertarian National Committee officers leading to the defeat of most of the incumbents who were seen as being part of a "top-down faction". The voting for chair saw the first instance where "None of the Above", which was listed as a choice on the party ballot, received more votes than any of the candidates for chair. After a new list of individuals was nominated, Geoff Neale was elected chair. R. Lee Wrights was elected Vice Chair, Ruth Bennett Secretary, and Tim Hagan Treasurer. Elected as national committee members-at-large were Bill Redpath, Michael Cloud, Arvin Vohra, and Wayne Allyn Root.

== See also ==
- Gary Johnson 2012 presidential campaign
- Libertarian National Convention
- Other parties' presidential nominating conventions of 2012:
  - Democratic
  - Green
  - Republican
- Libertarian Party of Nevada
- 2012 United States presidential election
