= Gary Johnson 2012 presidential campaign =

American political campaign

Gary Johnson 2012
- Campaign: 2012 United States presidential election
- Candidate: Gary Johnson; Former Governor of New Mexico (1995–2003); Jim Gray; Former judge
- Affiliation: Libertarian Party (formerly Republican Party)
- Headquarters: Salt Lake City, Utah, U.S.
- Key people: Jim Gray (Running mate); Ron Nielson (Senior Advisor)
- Receipts: US$2,553,878 (Nov. 26, 2012)
- Slogan(s): The People's President; Live Free

Website
- Gary Johnson 2012

The 2012 presidential campaign of Gary Johnson, the 29th governor of New Mexico, was announced on April 21, 2011. He declared his candidacy for the 2012 Republican Party nomination for President of the United States. On December 28, 2011, Johnson withdrew his candidacy for the Republican nomination, and declared his candidacy for the 2012 presidential nomination of the Libertarian Party. The 2012 Libertarian National Convention was held during the first weekend of May 2012. On May 5, 2012, after promoting his libertarian-oriented political positions to delegates, Johnson received the most votes at the convention and became the official 2012 Libertarian presidential nominee. On November 6, 2012, Johnson received just under 1% of the popular vote in the general election, amounting to more than 1.2 million votes, more than double what the Barr/Root ticket received in 2008. This was the most successful result for a third-party presidential candidacy since 2000, and the best in the Libertarian Party's history by vote number at the time. Johnson ran again in 2016 and received nearly four times his 2012 vote total.

== Background ==
Johnson initially indicated interest in running for president in the 2012 election in 2009. In October of that year, he founded the Our America Initiative, a 501(c)(4) "nonprofit political advocacy committee that promotes common-sense business approaches to governing." The stated focus of the organization was to "...speak out on issues regarding topics such as government efficiency, lowering taxes, ending the war on drugs, protecting civil liberties, revitalizing the economy and promoting entrepreneurship and privatization." The move prompted speculation among media pundits and Johnson's supporters as to whether he was laying the groundwork for a 2012 presidential run.

In December 2009, Johnson hired strategist Ron Nielson of NSON Opinion Strategy to organize the committee. Nielson has worked with Johnson since 1993 when he ran his successful gubernatorial campaign.

Throughout 2010, Johnson repeatedly deflected questions regarding his potential presidential candidacy by explaining that his 501(c)(4) status forbade him from expressing a desire to run for federal office.

In February 2011, Johnson was a featured speaker at both the Conservative Political Action Conference (CPAC) and the Republican Liberty Caucus. Johnson tied with New Jersey governor Chris Christie for third in the CPAC Straw Poll, trailing only Ron Paul and Mitt Romney. In that poll, he placed ahead of such notables as former Speaker of the House Newt Gingrich, former Minnesota governor Tim Pawlenty, Indiana governor Mitch Daniels and former Alaska governor and 2008 vice presidential candidate Sarah Palin. David Weigel of Slate called Johnson the second-biggest winner of the conference, writing that his "third-place showing in the straw poll gave Johnson his first real media hook ... He met tons of reporters, commanded a small scrum after the vote, and is a slightly lighter shade of dark horse now."

== Campaign developments ==
=== Announcement ===
On April 21, 2011, Johnson officially announced via Twitter that he was running for president. He followed this announcement with a speech at the New Hampshire State House in Concord, New Hampshire.

Johnson focused the majority of his Republican campaign activities on the New Hampshire primary.

=== Campaign staff ===
Johnson chose Ron Nielson of NSON Opinion Strategy, the director of both of his two New Mexico gubernatorial campaigns, as his presidential campaign manager and senior advisor. His campaign was run from Salt Lake City, Utah, where Nielson's offices are located. Johnson's economics advisor was Harvard economics professor Jeffrey Miron.

=== Republican debates ===
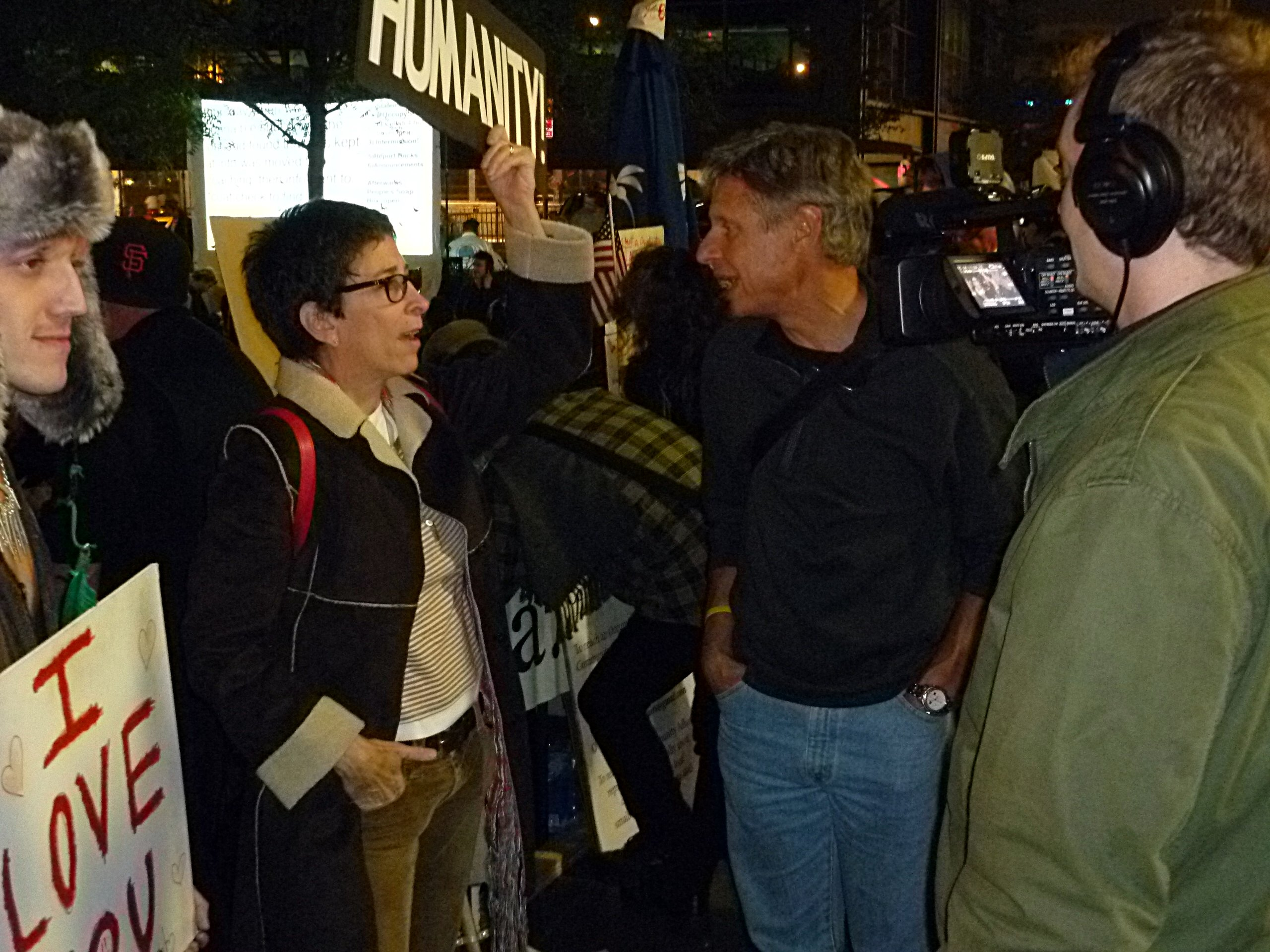
Governor Johnson visits Occupy-Protesters in Zuccotti Park, October 18, 2011

Johnson participated in the first of the Republican presidential debates, hosted by Fox News in South Carolina on May 5, 2011, appearing on stage with Herman Cain, Ron Paul, Tim Pawlenty, and Rick Santorum. Mitt Romney and Michele Bachmann both declined to debate.

Johnson was excluded from the next three debates on June 13 (hosted by CNN in New Hampshire), August 11 (hosted by Fox News in Iowa), and September 7 (hosted by CNN in California). After the first exclusion, Johnson made a 43-minute video responding to each of the debate questions, which he posted on YouTube. The first exclusion, which was widely publicized, gave Johnson "a little bump" in name recognition and an increase in small donations for a few days. Not being in the debate caused serious long-term problems for the campaign as it became difficult to raise money from donors, Johnson's name being pulled from polls and few opportunities from the media to respond to events. For the financial quarter ending June 30, Johnson raised a mere $180,000. Johnson still managed to poll higher two weeks prior to the September 7th debate than Rick Santorum or Jon Huntsman, who were invited to that debate while Johnson was not.

Then, on September 21, Fox News decided that because Johnson polled at least 2% in five recent polls, he could participate in a September 23 debate in Florida, which it co-hosted with the Florida Republican Party (the party objected to Johnson's inclusion). Johnson participated, appearing on stage with Michele Bachmann, Herman Cain, Newt Gingrich, Jon Huntsman, Ron Paul, Rick Perry, Mitt Romney, and Rick Santorum. During the debate, Johnson delivered what many media outlets, including the Los Angeles Times, and Time, called the best line of the night: "My next-door neighbor's two dogs have created more shovel ready jobs than this current administration." Entertainment Weekly opined that Johnson had won the debate.

=== Switch to Libertarian Party ===
On November 29, 2011, Johnson confirmed reports that he was ending all campaign activities for the New Hampshire primary, citing his inability to gain any traction with the primary's likely voters. Stated Johnson: "It's not happening in New Hampshire. We rode bikes 500 miles across the state, we scheduled town halls – for whatever reason, nobody's really coming out to hear what it is I have to say." Johnson confirmed reports that he was considering a run on the Libertarian Party (LP) ticket. Libertarian Party officials reported that Johnson would make an announcement on his political future on December 28, 2011; Politico reported it was expected that he would drop his bid for the Republican nomination and seek the Libertarian nomination instead.

On December 28, 2011, Johnson announced at press conference in Santa Fe, New Mexico that he had withdrawn his candidacy for the Republican presidential nomination, and officially declared his candidacy for the 2012 Libertarian Party presidential nomination. During the announcement, Johnson stated, "I'm a Libertarian in belief. I successfully governed as a Libertarian in everything but the name, and I am running for president as a Libertarian." Johnson was quickly identified as the early front-runner for the party's nomination and polled more than seventy percent of votes cast in the California Libertarian Party's straw poll on March 3, 2012.

On April 30, 2012, Johnson formally endorsed retired California Superior Court judge Jim Gray as his choice for running mate on the LP ticket in anticipation of receiving the nomination at the 2012 Libertarian National Convention in May 2012.

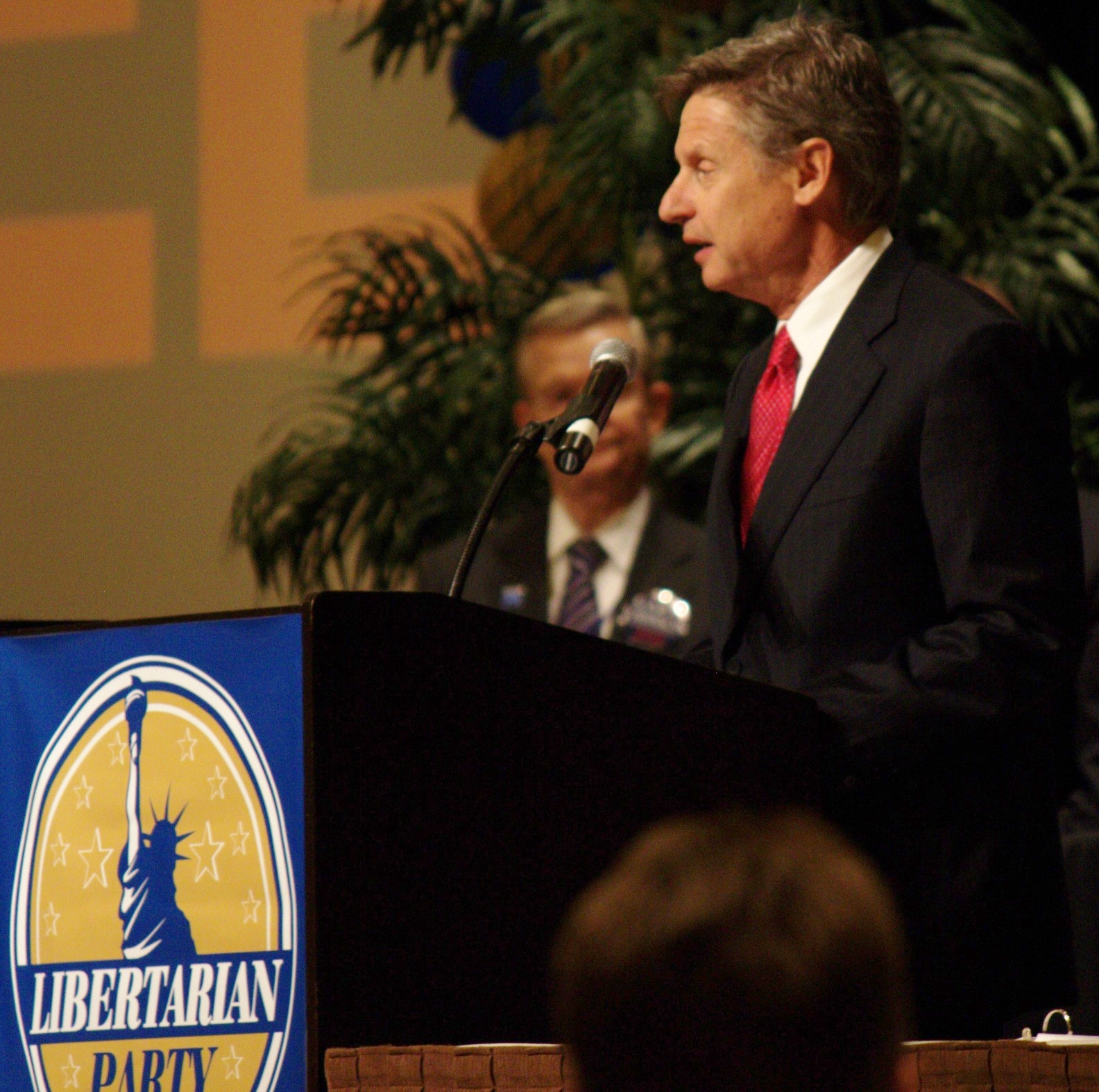
Gary Johnson during presidential nomination debate at Libertarian Party convention.

=== Nomination ===
On May 5, 2012, at the Libertarian National Convention, Johnson received the Libertarian Party's official nomination for President of the United States by a vote of 419 votes to 152 votes for second-place candidate Lee Wrights. Following his nomination, Johnson asked the convention's delegates to nominate as his vice-presidential running-mate Judge Jim Gray of California. Gray won the vice-presidential nomination on the first ballot.

=== Ballot access ===
Gary Johnson: Ballot access Write-in access

Although there were numerous challenges to Johnson's ballot access, the Libertarian Party confirmed that Johnson received ballot access in 48 states and Washington D.C.. The Libertarian Party was able to achieve write-in vote status in Michigan, with Oklahoma the only state to not include Johnson at all.

Johnson faced resistance from Republicans over the matter of whether or not Johnson would appear on several state ballots. In some states, such as Pennsylvania, where Johnson had more than the officially required number of signatures necessary for the Libertarian Party candidate to appear on the ballot, the validity of the signatures was contested by Republicans. In Iowa, a lawsuit was filed suing the Iowa Secretary of State, Matt Schultz, to remove Johnson from the ballot; the suit said that a reason for fighting Johnson's appearance on the ballot was that Johnson would cause "irreparable harm to other candidates and political parties who must compete against him," and that his appearance would cause "irreparable injury to the voting public because it could improperly impact the election."

When speaking of Johnson's chances of making the ballot in the three states that had not up to that point agreed to include Johnson, Richard Winger, editor of Ballot Access News, said that "Pennsylvania is likely, Michigan a maybe, Oklahoma almost impossible." On October 10, the Libertarian Party declared success in Pennsylvania.

By October Johnson was confirmed to be on the ballot in 48 states and in the District of Columbia, with only Michigan and Oklahoma still in litigation in regards to his ballot access. In the end Johnson received write-in status in Michigan, but was completely excluded from the Oklahoma ballot.

=== Polls ===
==== National ====
10–13 July 2012, JZ Analytics: Barack Obama 43.6%, Mitt Romney 38.0%, Gary Johnson 5.3%, not sure 13.1%

August 2012, Rasmussen Reports poll includes Johnson for the first time. One in ten likely voters are familiar with him and 1 percent intends to vote for him.

September 2012, CNN poll includes Johnson. 4% of registered voters say that they would vote for him.

November 1, 2012 CNN poll includes Johnson. 5.1% of 796 likely voters indicated that they would vote for Gary Johnson.

=== Debates ===
Johnson and Green Party presidential nominee Jill Stein sued the Commission on Presidential Debates, the Republican National Committee and the Democratic National Committee, alleging that the commission's failure to extend them an invitation to the 2012 violated the Sherman Antitrust Act and the First Amendment. Johnson and Stein's suit was dismissed by the federal courts; the U.S. Court of Appeals for the D.C. Circuit ruled in 2017 that the two candidates lacked a valid legal claim or a cognizable injury.

=== Relationship with Ron Paul's campaign ===
Initially, Johnson hoped Ron Paul would not run for president so that Johnson could galvanize from Paul's network of libertarian-minded voters. Johnson even traveled to Houston to tell Paul of his decision to run in person. But Paul announced his own candidacy on May 13, 2011.

Following Paul's failure to receive the Republican nomination, Johnson actively sought, and, to at least some level, received the support of Paul's libertarian minded supporters for his own campaign. Paul himself did not officially endorse anybody, though in an October 2012 interview Paul hinted, but did not confirm that he was planning on voting for Johnson.

== Campaign financial data ==
The Johnson-Gray campaign raised $2,553,878 with 87% from private donations and 13% from federal funds. No money was raised from any PACs. In comparison, Barack Obama's campaign raised over $632,000,000 (spending almost $541,000,000) and Mitt Romney's campaign raised over $389,000,000 (spending over $336,000,000).

| | Total Raised ($) | Total Spent ($) | Cash on Hand ($) | Debts ($) |
|---|---|---|---|---|
| 2012 | $2,553,878 | $2,507,763 | $2,943 | $197,002 |

== Results ==
Johnson finished with 1,247,923 votes, which at that time was an all-time Libertarian Party record in terms of raw total. He received 0.99% of the popular vote, which was then the party's second-best showing ever in vote percentage in a presidential election, behind that of Ed Clark in 1980. In his home state of New Mexico, Johnson received 3.6% of the vote.

National popular vote
| Obama (winner) | 51.1% |
| Romney | 47.2% |
| Johnson | 1.0% |
| Stein | 0.4% |
| Others | 0.4% |

== Endorsements ==
List of Gary Johnson endorsements

Endorsements as a Republican candidate

- Christopher R. Barron, member of the board of directors and co-founder of GOProud
- Political consultant Roger Stone
- Syndicated columnist Dennis "DJ" Mikolay
- Daniel Hannan, British journalist and Conservative Party member of the European Parliament.
- New Hampshire state representatives Bruce MacMahon, Kyle Tasker and Brian Seaworth
- TeaPot Party

Endorsements as a Libertarian candidate

- James D. Schultz, political activist and 2018 New York State Assembly candidate.
- Political consultant Roger Stone
- Vice Admiral Michael Colley, US Navy (Ret.)
- Conor Friedersdorf, journalist.
- Hon. Jim Gray, presiding judge of the Superior Court of Orange County, California (Ret.)
- Fmr. FEC Chairman Bradley A. Smith
- Fmr. NM House Minority Leader Kip Nicely
- Christopher R. Barron, member of the board of directors and co-founder of GOProud
- Big Boi, rapper, member of Outkast
- Adam Kokesh, talk show host and activist
- Penn Jillette, illusionist, comedian, musician, and author
- Jesse Ventura, former Independence Party and Reform Party Governor of Minnesota
- Buddy Roemer, former Republican Governor of Louisiana
- Alex Jones, radio host, author, conspiracy theorist and documentary filmmaker
- Philip DeFranco, internet personality.
- Lisa Kennedy Montgomery, political satirist, radio personality, and former MTV VJ
- Andrew Napolitano, former New Jersey Superior Court Judge, political and senior judicial analyst for Fox News Channel and libertarian conservative talk show host
- John Stossel, award-winning journalist/commentator currently working for Fox Business Network
- Peter Bagge,
- Ronald Bailey,
- Nick Gillespie,
- Tibor Machan,
- Deirdre McCloskey,
- Jacob Sullum,
- Jesse Walker,
- Matt Welch,
- Bill Kauffman,

Libertarian Party members

- Bill Redpath, treasurer and immediate past chair, Libertarian National Committee
- Guy McLendon, member of 2006/2008/2010 LP National Platform Committees
- Jake Porter, Former Region 6 alternate-Libertarian National Committee member (2008–2010)
- John "J" Mills, past chairman of The Libertarian Party of Washington State
- Karen Green, vice chair, McLean County Libertarian Party
- Jason Sharp, Libertarian candidate Indiana 7th Congressional District
- Alexander L. George, vice-chairman, Libertarian Party of Polk County, Florida
- Randy Eshelman, at-large representative to the Libertarian National Committee
- Adrian Wyllie, chairman, Libertarian Party of Florida
- Rob Power, chairman, current treasurer and former chairman (2004–2010) of Outright Libertarians, former LP National Platform Committee member, former LP of California executive committee member, former chairman of the Libertarian Party of San Francisco
- Scotty Boman, U.S. Senate candidate
- Jo Jorgensen, academic; Libertarian nominee for vice president in 1996; Libertarian nominee for U.S. Representative from SC-04 in 1992

State Libertarian Parties

- Libertarian Party of Nebraska
- Libertarian Party of South Carolina executive committee
- Libertarian Party of Utah

Academics

- Jeffrey Miron, senior lecturer and director of undergraduate studies in economics, Harvard University
- Howard Baetjer Jr., lecturer, Department of Economics, Towson University
- William J. Carney, Charles Howard Candler Professor of Law, Emory University
- James L. Doti, president of Chapman University
- Lynne Kiesling, distinguished senior lecturer in economics, Northwestern University
- Mark LeBar, associate professor of philosophy, Ohio University
- Daniel Lin, assistant professor of economics, American University
- Kate Litvak, professor of law, Northwestern University
- Andrew P. Morriss, D. Paul Jones Jr. & Charlene Jones Chair in Law, University of Alabama
- Michael Munger, professor of political science, public policy, and economics, Duke University
- David G. Post, professor of law, Temple University
- Laurie A. Schmidt, professor of education, Indiana Wesleyan University
- Daniel Shapiro, professor of philosophy, West Virginia University
- Bradley A. Smith, Josiah H. Blackmore II/Shirley M. Nault Designated Professor of Law, Capital University
- Ilya Somin, associate professor of law, George Mason University
- Alexander "Sasha" Volokh, assistant professor of law, Emory University
- Hanah Metchis Volokh, visiting assistant professor of law, Emory University
- Glen Whitman, professor of economics, California State University, Northridge University
- Michael D. Freeman, PhD MPH DC MedDr, affiliate professor of epidemiology and psychiatry, Oregon Health and Science University School of Medicine
- W. William Woolsey, associate professor of economics, The Citadel

Activists

- Brandon Immel, editor of Lemon Global, director of Ohio-based protest organization group Pro-(1)ne, and candidate for Ohio's 98th District state representative in 2014

Newspapers

- Saint Joseph Telegraph, St. Joseph, Missouri
- Chattanooga Times Free Press, Chattanooga, Tennessee
- The Daily Telegram, Adrian, Michigan

== See also ==
- Political positions of Gary Johnson
