= 2010 New York Attorney General election =

- November 2, 2010
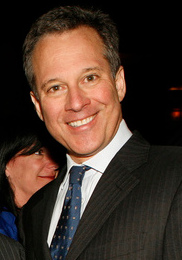

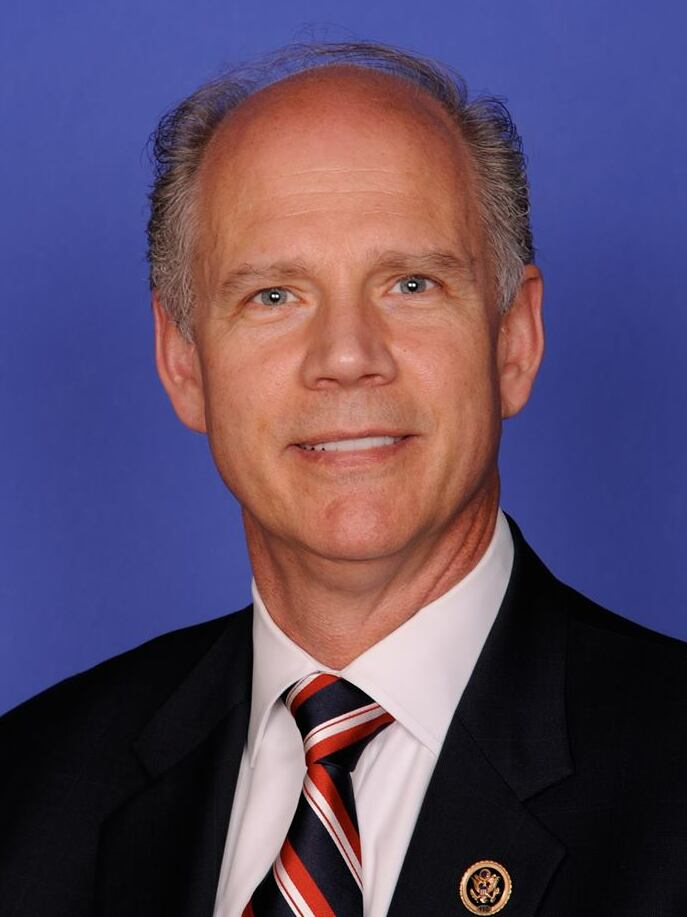
Nominee	Eric Schneiderman	Dan Donovan
Party	Democratic	Republican
Popular vote	2,478,659	1,910,361
Percentage	55.77%	42.98%
- County results Schneiderman: 40–50% 50–60% 60–70% 70–80% 80–90% Donovan: 40–50% 50–60% 60–70%
Attorney General before election
Andrew Cuomo
Democratic
Elected Attorney General
Eric Schneiderman
Democratic

The New York Attorney General election of 2010 took place on November 2, 2010 to elect the Attorney General of New York. Democratic nominee Eric Schneiderman defeated Republican nominee Dan Donovan. Previous Democratic Attorney General Andrew Cuomo vacated the office following his run for governor.

== Democratic primary ==
=== Candidates ===
- Richard Brodsky, State Assemblyman
- Sean Coffey, former Assistant United States Attorney
- Eric R. Dinallo, former New York Superintendent of Insurance
- Kathleen Rice, Nassau County District Attorney
- Eric Schneiderman, State Senator

=== Results ===
Democratic primary results
Party	Candidate	Votes	%
Democratic	Eric Schneiderman	227,203	34.36%
Democratic	Kathleen Rice	210,726	31.87%
Democratic	Sean Coffey	108,185	16.36%
Democratic	Richard L. Brodsky	65,683	9.93%
Democratic	Eric R. Dinallo	49,499	7.49%
Majority		16,477	2.49%
Turnout		661,296	12.53%

== Republican primary ==
=== Candidates ===
- Robert Antonacci, Onondaga County Comptroller
- Daniel M. Donovan, Jr., Richmond County District Attorney

=== Results ===
Republican Convention results
Party	Candidate	Votes	%
Republican	Daniel M. Donovan, Jr.		59.79%
Republican	Robert Antonacci		40.21%

== Independence Party ==
- Stephen Lynch, attorney

== Freedom Party ==
- Ramon J. Jimenez

== Libertarian Party ==
- Carl Person, attorney

== General election ==
=== Results ===
General election results
Party	Candidate	Votes	%	±%
Democratic	Eric Schneiderman	2,478,659	55.77%	−2.54
Republican	Dan Donovan	1,910,361	42.98%	+3.65
Libertarian	Carl Person	36,488	0.82%	+0.14
Freedom	Ramon J. Jimenez	18,021	0.41%	N/A
Write-ins		1,159	0.03%	N/A
Total votes		4,444,688	100.0%	
Democratic hold				
