= Eric Schneiderman =

American lawyer and politician (born 1954)

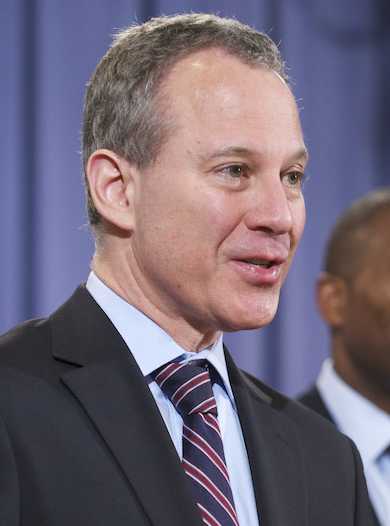
- Schneiderman in 2012

65th Attorney General of New York
- In office January 1, 2011 – May 8, 2018
- Governor: Andrew Cuomo
- Preceded by: Andrew Cuomo
- Succeeded by: Barbara Underwood

Member of the New York State Senate
- In office January 1, 1999 – December 31, 2010
- Preceded by: Franz Leichter
- Succeeded by: Adriano Espaillat
- Constituency: 30th district (1999–2002); 31st district (2003–2010)

Personal details
- Born: Eric Tradd Schneiderman; December 31, 1954 (age 71) New York City, New York, U.S.
- Party: Democratic
- Spouse: Jennifer Cunningham (divorced)
- Children: 1
- Education: Amherst College (BA); Harvard University (JD)

Eric Tradd Schneiderman (born December 31, 1954) is an American lawyer and politician who served as the 65th attorney general of New York from 2011 until his resignation in May 2018. A member of the Democratic Party, he spent ten years in the New York State Senate before being elected Attorney General. In May 2018, Schneiderman resigned from his position as Attorney General after The New Yorker reported that four women had accused him of physical abuse. In 2021, Schneiderman’s law license was suspended for a year after a disciplinary proceeding where he admitted to the abusive conduct.

== Early life, education, family, and early career ==
Schneiderman was born to a Jewish family in New York City, a son of Abigail Heyward and Irwin Schneiderman, a lawyer. He graduated from the Trinity School in New York City in 1972 and Amherst College in 1977. He earned his Juris Doctor from Harvard Law School in 1982.

Schneiderman served as a judicial clerk for two years within the U.S. District Court for the Southern District of New York and subsequently joined the international law firm Kirkpatrick and Lockhart LLP (now known as K&L Gates), where he became a partner. Schneiderman married Jennifer Cunningham in 1990. They later divorced in 1996. They have a daughter, Catherine, who is married to Matthew Newton.

== New York Senate ==
Schneiderman was elected to represent the 31st district in the New York State Senate. At the time, this district comprised Manhattan's Upper West Side, as well as Morningside Heights, West Harlem, Washington Heights, Inwood, and Marble Hill, in addition to part of Riverdale in the Bronx.

=== Elections ===
In the 1998 Democratic primary, Schneiderman, defeated Daniel O'Donnell, a civil rights attorney, with 68% of the vote. In the general election, he defeated Vincent McGowen with 82% of the vote. He won re-election in 2000 (84%), in 2002 (87%), 2004 (89%), 2006 (92%), and 2008 (90%).

=== Tenure ===
Schneiderman was the chief sponsor of the Rockefeller Drug Law reforms, which were passed and signed into law in 2009 by Governor David Paterson. The reforms included reducing reliance on long, mandatory minimum sentences, and allocating funds for alternatives to incarceration, focusing on treatment and reentry of prisoners into society. His other legislative activities include passing ethics reforms to root out fraud against taxpayers.

== New York Attorney General ==
=== Elections ===
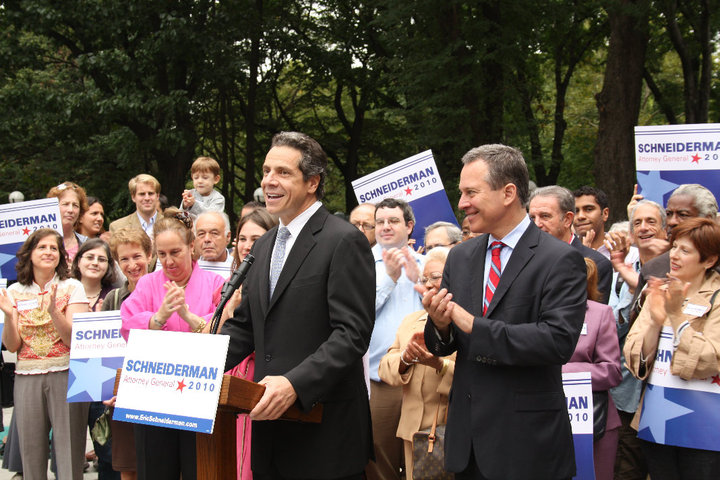
Then Attorney General Andrew Cuomo endorsing Schneiderman during the 2010 election.

Schneiderman was the Democratic Party nominee for New York Attorney General. He denied being involved in a hit-and-run automobile accident in July 2010. He defeated Nassau County District Attorney Kathleen Rice and three other candidates in the Democratic primary on September 14, 2010. Schneiderman defeated Republican nominee and Richmond County District Attorney Dan Donovan in the general election and took office on January 1, 2011.

Schneiderman won re-election in 2014. His major opponent was Republican John P. Cahill, who had been an environmental conservation commissioner for the state.

=== Tenure ===
Schneiderman was instrumental in pushing for a tougher fraud settlement with large banks over illegal foreclosure practices. Along with California Attorney General Kamala Harris, Schneiderman pushed to prevent the settlement from including immunity for the banks from further investigation and prosecution of other related illegal activities.

In 2011, Melissa DeRosa, who was later the Secretary to New York Governor Andrew Cuomo, became deputy chief of staff and acting chief of staff for Schneiderman.

In 2013, future New York State Assemblyman Micah Lasher became Schneiderman's Chief of Staff. Lasher's first job, at age 16 in 1998, was as deputy campaign manager for Schneiderman’s campaign for the New York State Senate.

In August 2013, Schneiderman filed a $40 million civil lawsuit against Donald Trump for his "Trump University" (now known as Trump Entrepreneur Initiative), alleging it to be an "unlicensed university" and calling it a "bait-and-switch scheme". Trump denied all accusations, calling Schneiderman a "political hack". In October 2014, a New York judge found Trump personally liable for the institution's not having the required license.

In September 2013, Schneiderman announced a settlement with 19 companies to prevent astroturfing; i.e., buying fake online praise. "'Astroturfing' is the 21st century's version of false advertising, and prosecutors have many tools at their disposal to put an end to it," according to Schneiderman. The companies paid $350,000 to settle the matter, but the settlement opened the way for private suits as well. "Every state has some version of the statutes New York used," according to lawyer Kelly H. Kolb. "What the New York attorney general has done is, perhaps, to have given private lawyers a road map to file suit."

Schneiderman and Manhattan District Attorney Cyrus Vance Jr. were sued in 2015 in a constitutional challenge to New York's 1997 ban on mixed martial arts. The following year, the New York State Legislature legalized MMA in the state.

In November 2015, Schneiderman issued cease-and-desist letters to daily fantasy sports companies DraftKings and FanDuel, accusing the companies of operating a gambling enterprise that is illegal under New York law. This sparked a six-month-long legal battle. Schneiderman reached a settlement with the companies in March 2016, under which DraftKings and FanDuel agreed to stop operating in New York until September 2016 and Schneiderman agreed to drop all of the state's suits against DraftKings and FanDuel—except for a false advertising claim against FanDuel—if the New York State Legislature passed legislation legalizing daily fantasy sports by the adjournment of the session.

In 2017, during President Donald Trump's first year in office, the Trump administration sought to scrap numerous Obama-era environmental regulations that Trump viewed as an impediment to business. Schneiderman filed over 50 lawsuits opposing Trump's environmental actions.

In February 2018, Schneiderman brought a civil rights lawsuit against The Weinstein Company, alleging the company "repeatedly broke New York law by failing to protect its employees from pervasive sexual harassment, intimidation, and discrimination". The lawsuit delayed the sale of The Weinstein Company with the Attorney General adding, "Any sale of the Weinstein Company must ensure that victims will be compensated."

=== Reports of abuse and resignation ===
On May 7, 2018, Jane Mayer and Ronan Farrow reported in The New Yorker that Schneiderman had physically abused at least four women during his tenure as Attorney General. According to the report, Schneiderman had, between about 2013 and 2016, committed acts of violence against three romantic partners (blogger and activist Michelle Manning Barish, author and actress Tanya Selvaratnam, and a third woman), as well as an unnamed female attorney. The women said that Schneiderman had choked, hit or violently slapped them, all without their consent. Selvaratnam added that Schneiderman spat on her, choked her, called her his "brown slave," ordered her to call him "Master" and say that she was "his property," and demanded that she find another woman who would be willing to engage in a ménage à trois. Both Selvaratnam and Barish alleged that Schneiderman engaged in a pattern of alcohol abuse, and that he had threatened to kill them if they ended their respective relationships with him. Mayer and Farrow reported that they confirmed the women's allegations with photographs of wounds and bruises, as well as with statements from friends in whom the women had confided after the assaults.

In his initial response to the allegations, Schneiderman said: "In the privacy of intimate relationships, I have engaged in role-playing and other consensual sexual activity. I have not assaulted anyone. I have never engaged in nonconsensual sex, which is a line I would not cross." Three hours after the article was published in The New Yorker, Schneiderman announced his resignation effective the next day. In a statement, he said that he "strongly contested" the allegations, but resigned because they would "effectively prevent" him from performing the duties of his office. He did not seek re-election. Schneiderman's deputy, Solicitor General Barbara Underwood, was appointed to replace him as Attorney General.

== Criminal investigation and disciplinary proceedings ==
Governor Andrew Cuomo assigned Nassau County District Attorney Madeline Singas as a special prosecutor to investigate possible criminal charges against Schneiderman arising out of the abuse allegations that had been made against him. On November 8, 2018, Singas announced that Schneiderman would not be prosecuted. Singas stated that she believed the allegations made by Schneiderman's accusers, but added that "legal impediments, including statutes of limitations, preclude criminal prosecution." In response, Schneiderman stated, "I recognize that District Attorney Singas' decision not to prosecute does not mean I have done nothing wrong. I accept full responsibility for my conduct in my relationships with my accusers, and for the impact it had on them." Schneiderman further stated that he was "committed to a lifelong path of recovery and making amends" and apologized for the pain he had caused.

In 2019, Schneiderman completed a class to become a meditation teacher.

In 2021, Schneiderman’s law license was suspended for a year after a disciplinary proceeding in which he admitted to abusive conduct.

In 2022, Schneiderman promised not to run for political office again.

== Electoral history ==
New York State Senate 30th district election, 1998
Party	Candidate	Votes	%
Democratic	Eric Schneiderman	65,158	81.98
Republican*	Vincent McGowan	10,919	13.74
Green	Julia Willebrand	1,979	2.49
Conservative*	David Branche	1,421	1.79

*McGowan was also listed on the Liberal Party line; Brance was also listed on the Right to Life Party line.

New York State Senate 30th district election, 2000
Party	Candidate	Votes	%
Democratic*	Eric Schneiderman (inc.)	90,587	84.12
Republican*	Roger Madon	14,516	13.48
Liberal	Marc Stadtmauer	1,904	1.77
Conservative	Paul Gallant Jr.	680	0.63

*Schneiderman was also listed on the Working Families Party line; Madon was also listed on the Independence Party line.

New York State Senate 31st district election, 2002
Party	Candidate	Votes	%
Democratic*	Eric Schneiderman (inc.)	40,900	86.52
Republican	Bienvenido Toribio Jr.	5,843	12.36
Conservative	Michael Walters	528	1.12

*Schneiderman was also listed on the Working Families Party line.

New York State Senate 31st district election, 2004
Party	Candidate	Votes	%
Democratic*	Eric Schneiderman (inc.)	76,365	89.17
Republican	Jose Goris	9,272	10.83

*Schneiderman was also listed on the Working Families Party line.

New York State Senate 31st district election, 2006
Party	Candidate	Votes	%
Democratic*	Eric Schneiderman (inc.)	51,202	92.30
Republican	Stylo Sapaskis	4,270	7.70

*Schneiderman was also listed on the Working Families Party line.

New York State Senate 31st district election, 2008
Party	Candidate	Votes	%
Democratic*	Eric Schneiderman (inc.)	80,832	89.97
Republican	Martin Chicon	8,349	9.29
Conservative	Stephen Bradian	662	0.74

*Schneiderman was also listed on the Working Families Party line.

New York Attorney General Democratic primary election, 2010
Party	Candidate	Votes	%
Democratic	Eric Schneiderman	227,203	34.36
Democratic	Kathleen Rice	210,726	31.87
Democratic	Sean Coffey	108,185	16.36
Democratic	Richard Brodsky	65,683	9.93
Democratic	Eric Dinallo	49,499	7.49

New York Attorney General election, 2010
Party	Candidate	Votes	%
Democratic*	Eric Schneiderman	2,477,438	55.78
Republican*	Dan Donovan	1,909,525	42.99
Libertarian	Carl Person	36,488	0.82
Freedom	Ramon Jimenez	18,028	0.41

*Schneiderman was also listed on the Independence Party and Working Families Party line; Donovan was also listed on the Conservative Party line.

New York Attorney General election, 2014
Party	Candidate	Votes	%
Democratic*	Eric Schneiderman (inc.)	2,069,956	55.73
Republican*	John Cahill	1,538,990	41.43
Green	Ramon Jimenez	80,813	2.18
Libertarian	Carl Person	24,746	0.67

*Schneiderman was also listed on the Independence Party, Working Families Party, and Women's Equality Party lines; Cahill was also listed on the Conservative Party and Stop Common Core Party lines.

== See also ==
- List of Jewish American jurists

New York State Senate
Preceded by Franz Leichter	Member of the New York Senate from the 30th district 1999–2002	Succeeded by David Paterson
Preceded by Efrain Gonzalez	Member of the New York Senate from the 31st district 2003–2010	Succeeded by Adriano Espaillat
Preceded by Dale Volker	Chair of the New York Senate Codes Committee; 2009–2010	Succeeded by Stephen Saland
Party political offices
Preceded by Andrew Cuomo	Democratic nominee for Attorney General of New York; 2010, 2014	Succeeded by Letitia James
Legal offices
Preceded by Andrew Cuomo	Attorney General of New York; 2011–2018	Succeeded by Barbara Underwood; Acting
