= 2012 Libertarian Party presidential primaries =

- February 7 – June 5, 2012

Non-binding preferential vote
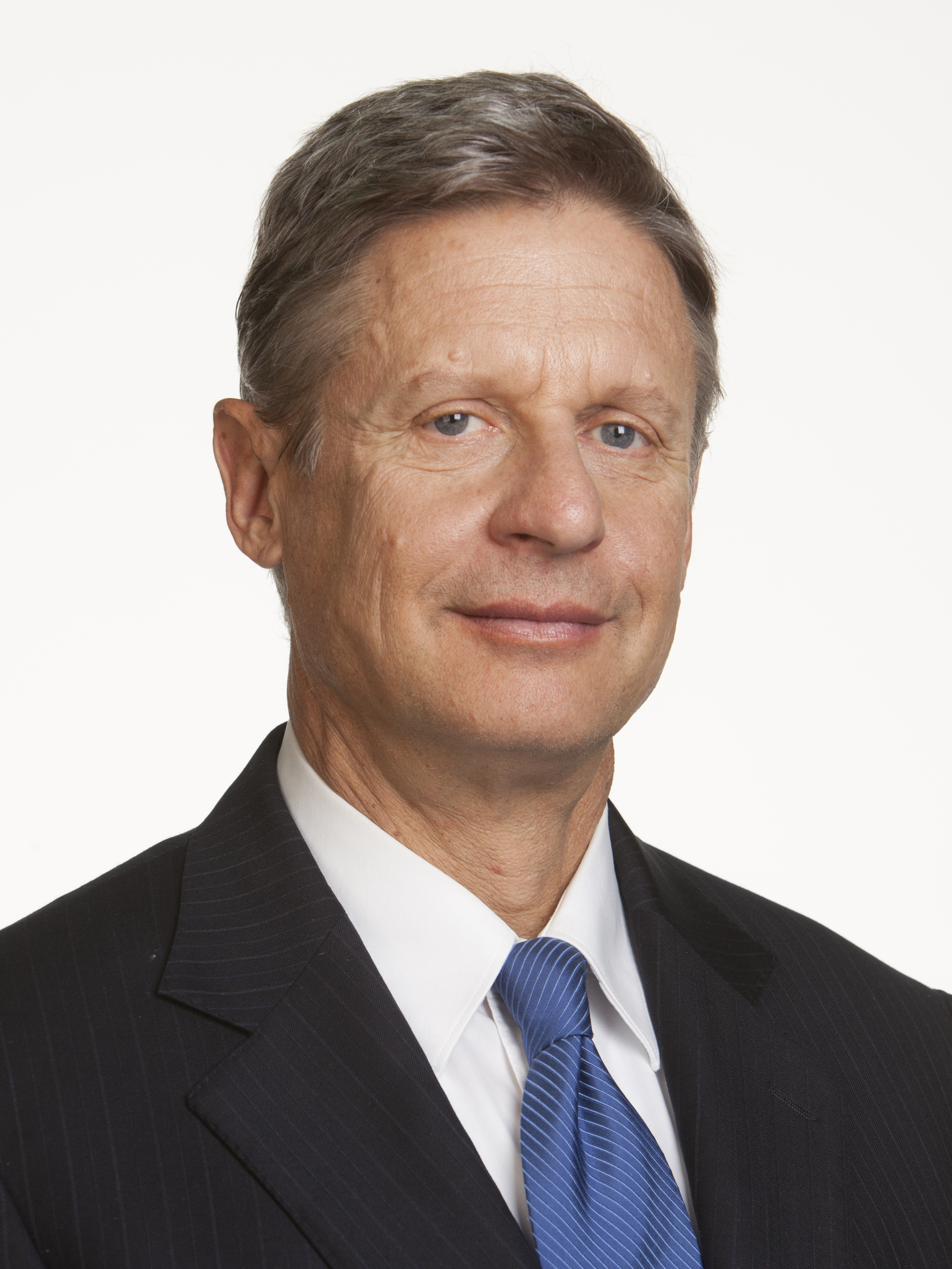

| Candidate | Gary Johnson | Uncommitted | Barbara Joy Waymire |
| Home state | New Mexico | – |
| Contests won | 2 | 1 | 0 |
| Popular vote | 8,368 | 5,198 | 2,118 |
| Percentage | 37.5% | 23.3% | 9.5% |
| Candidate | Scott Keller | James Ogle |
| Contests won | 0 | 1 |
| Popular vote | 1,208 | 1,041 |
| Percentage | 5.4% | 4.7% |
First place by popular vote
Gary Johnson (2)
James Ogle (1)
Uncommitted (1)
No contest
Previous Libertarian nominee
Bob Barr
Libertarian nominee
Gary Johnson

The 2012 Libertarian Party presidential primaries allowed voters to indicate non-binding preferences for the Libertarian Party's presidential candidate. These differed from the Republican or Democratic presidential primaries and caucuses in that they did not appoint delegates to represent a candidate at the party's convention to select the party's nominee for the United States presidential election. The party's nominee for the 2012 presidential election was chosen directly by registered delegates at the 2012 Libertarian National Convention, which ran from May 2 to 6, 2012. The delegates nominated former New Mexico Governor Gary Johnson for President and former judge Jim Gray for Vice President.

Four primaries were held. A total of 22,346 votes were cast in these primaries.

== Candidates ==
| Candidate | Profession | Campaign | On primary ballot | | | | Popular vote |
| Candidate | Profession | Campaign | MO | NC | NE | CA | Popular vote |
|---|---|---|---|---|---|---|---|
| Gary Johnson | 29th Governor of New Mexico (1995–2003) | (campaign • positions); Running mate: Jim Gray | No | Yes | Yes | Yes | 8,368 |
| Barbara Joy Waymire | | | No | No | No | Yes | 2,118 |
| Scott Keller | | | No | No | No | Yes | 1,208 |
| James Ogle | Secretary of "U.S. Parliament" | | Yes | No | No | Yes | 1,041 |
| R. J. Harris | Republican candidate for U.S. Congress in 2010 | | No | Yes | Yes | Yes | 998 |
| Bill Still | | | No | Yes | Yes | Yes | 901 |
| Roger Gary | | | No | Yes | Yes | Yes | 878 |
| R. Lee Wrights | Vice-chairperson of the Libertarian National Committee | | No | Yes | Yes | Yes | 838 |
| Carl Person | Attorney | | No | Yes | Yes | Yes | 798 |
Alternate ballot options:
| Uncommitted | N/A | | Yes | Yes | No | No | 5,198 |

== Primaries and caucuses ==
=== Missouri primary ===
In the Missouri primary on February 7, the Libertarian Party had a state-run primary held alongside the Republican and Democratic primaries.

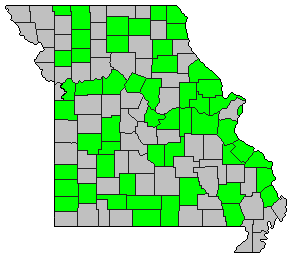
Results James Ogle Uncommitted

Missouri Libertarian presidential primary, February 7, 2012
| Candidate | Votes | Percentage |
|---|---|---|
| James Ogle | 483 | 52.8 |
| Uncommitted | 431 | 47.2 |
| Total | 914 | 100 |

=== North Carolina primary ===
In the North Carolina primary on May 8, the Libertarian Party had a state-run primary held alongside the Republican and Democratic primaries.

Missouri Libertarian presidential primary, May 8, 2012
| Candidate | Votes | Percentage |
|---|---|---|
| Uncommitted | 4,767 | 61.97 |
| Gary Johnson | 1,491 | 19.38 |
| R. Lee Wrights | 336 | 4.37 |
| R. J. Harris | 315 | 4.10 |
| Roger Gary | 301 | 3.91 |
| Carl Person | 261 | 3.39 |
| Bill Still | 221 | 2.87 |
| Total | 7,692 | 100 |

=== Nebraska primary ===
In the Nebraska primary on May 15, the Libertarian Party had a state-run primary held alongside the Democratic and Republican primaries.

Missouri Libertarian presidential primary, May 15, 2012
| Candidate | Votes | Percentage |
|---|---|---|
| Gary Johnson | 97 | 55.43 |
| R. Lee Wrights | 23 | 13.14 |
| Roger Gary | 18 | 10.29 |
| Carl Person | 14 | 8.00 |
| R. J. Harris | 13 | 7.43 |
| Bill Still | 10 | 5.71 |
| Total | 175 | 100 |

=== California primary ===
Type: Semi-Closed

In the California primary on June 5, the Libertarian Party had a state-run primary held alongside those for the Republicans, Democrats, the Green Party, the American Independent Party and the Peace and Freedom Party.

This non-binding primary took place after the 2012 Libertarian National Convention.

California Libertarian presidential primary, June 5, 2012
| Candidate | Votes | Percentage |
|---|---|---|
| Gary Johnson | 6,780 | 50.0 |
| Barbara Joy Waymire | 2,118 | 15.6 |
| Scott Keller | 1,208 | 8.9 |
| R. J. Harris | 670 | 4.9 |
| Bill Still | 670 | 4.9 |
| Roger Gary | 559 | 4.1 |
| James Ogle | 558 | 4.1 |
| Carl Person | 523 | 3.9 |
| R. Lee Wrights | 479 | 3.5 |
| Total | 13,565 | 100 |

== See also ==
- Gary Johnson 2012 presidential campaign

Presidential primaries

- 2012 Democratic Party presidential primaries
- 2012 Green Party presidential primaries
- 2012 Republican Party presidential primaries

National Conventions

- 2012 Constitution Party National Convention
- 2012 Libertarian National Convention
- 2012 Green National Convention
- 2012 Democratic National Convention
- 2012 Republican National Convention
