= 2012 United States presidential election in Illinois =

- November 6, 2012
- Turnout: 70.2% (▼1.4 pp)

Nominee	Barack Obama	Mitt Romney
Party	Democratic	Republican
Home state	Illinois	Massachusetts
Running mate	Joe Biden	Paul Ryan
Electoral vote	20	0
Popular vote	3,019,512	2,135,216
Percentage	57.60%	40.73%

Obama
40–50%
50–60%
60–70%
70–80%
80–90%
90–100%
Romney
40–50%
50–60%
60–70%
70–80%
80–90%
90–100%
President before election
Barack Obama
Democratic
Elected President
Barack Obama
Democratic

The 2012 United States presidential election in Illinois took place on November 6, 2012, as part of the 2012 United States presidential election in which all 50 states plus the District of Columbia participated. Illinois voters chose 20 electors to represent them in the Electoral College via a popular vote pitting incumbent Democratic President Barack Obama and his running mate, Vice President Joe Biden, against Republican challenger and former Massachusetts Governor Mitt Romney and his running mate, Congressman Paul Ryan. The Obama/Biden ticket won Illinois with 57.60% of the popular vote to Romney/Ryan's 40.73%, thus winning the state's twenty electoral votes by a margin of 16.87%.

Obama's victory continued a Democratic winning streak in the state — with the Democratic candidate having carried Illinois through six consecutive elections. However, despite Obama's win in 2008 and popularity in the state due to being its former U.S. Senator, his performance significantly worsened, with his margin of victory decreasing from 25.10% to 16.87% and losing 23 counties to Romney that he had won four years prior. Obama further became the first ever Democrat to win the White House without carrying Gallatin or Macoupin counties, as well as the first since Woodrow Wilson in 1916 to win the White House without carrying Madison County.

As of the 2024 election, this is the last time that a Democrat carried Alexander, Carroll, Fulton, Henderson, Henry, Jo Daviess, Knox, Mercer, Putnam, Warren, and Whiteside counties. It is also the last time a Democrat won more than 15 counties in the state.

== Primary elections ==
=== Democratic primary ===
2012 Illinois Democratic presidential primary
- March 20, 2012

212 Democratic National Convention delegates (189 pledged, 26 unpledged) The number of pledged delegates won is determined by the popular vote
Candidate	Barack Obama
Home state	Illinois
Delegate count	189
Popular vote	652,583
Percentage	99.98%
- Barack Obama

The 2012 Illinois Democratic presidential primary was held on March 20, 2012, in the U.S. state of Illinois as one of the Republican Party's state primaries ahead of the 2012 presidential election. Incumbent president Barack Obama won the primary. Obama was running for reelection without a major opponent.

Obama won all 189 of the state's bound delegates (the state also had 26 superdelegates).

2012 Illinois Democratic presidential primary
Candidate	Votes	Percentage	Delegates
Barack Obama (incumbent)	652,583	99.98%	189
Randall Terry	134	0.02%	0
Totals	652,717	100.00%	189

=== Republican primary ===
2012 Illinois Republican presidential primary
- March 20, 2012

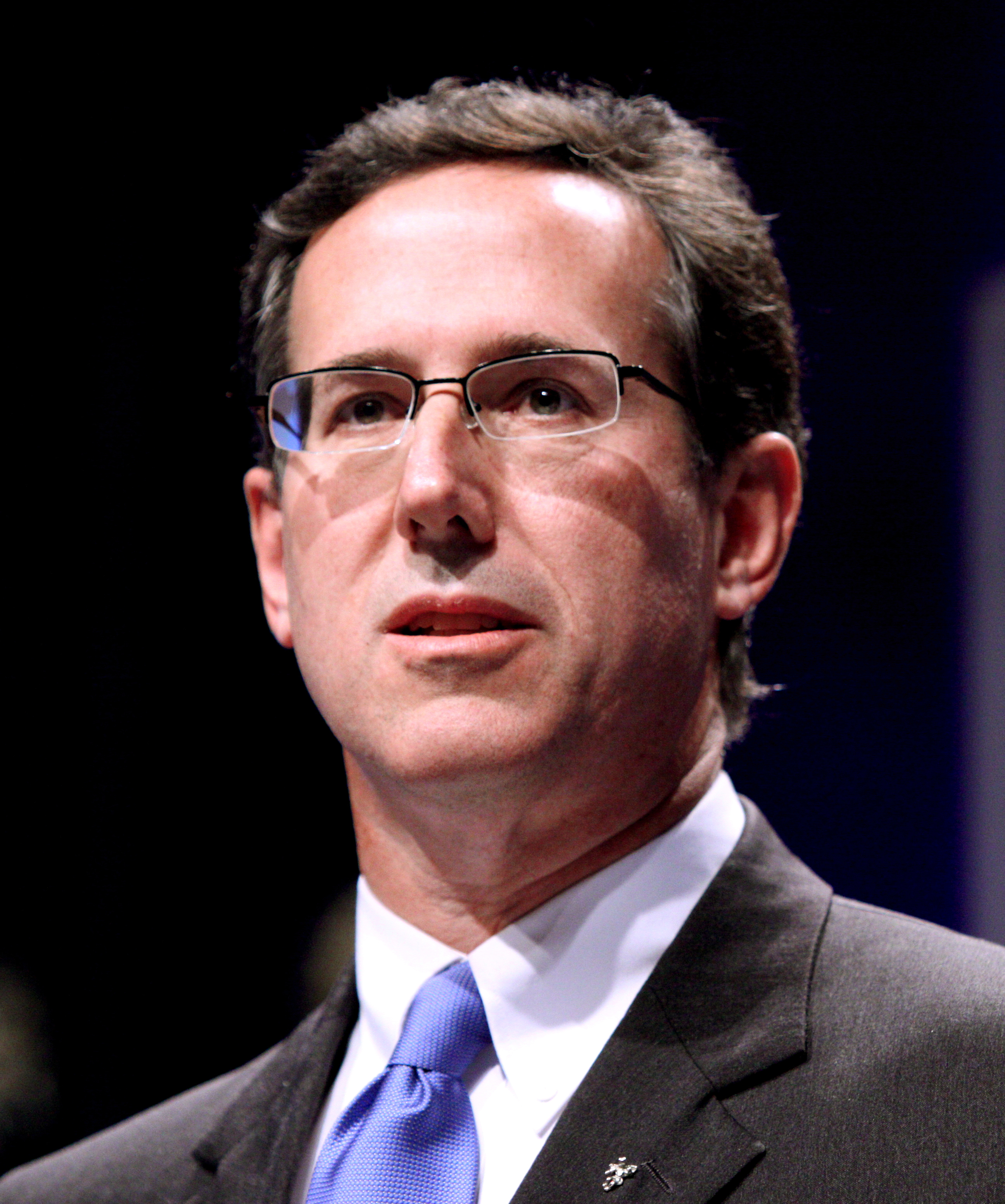

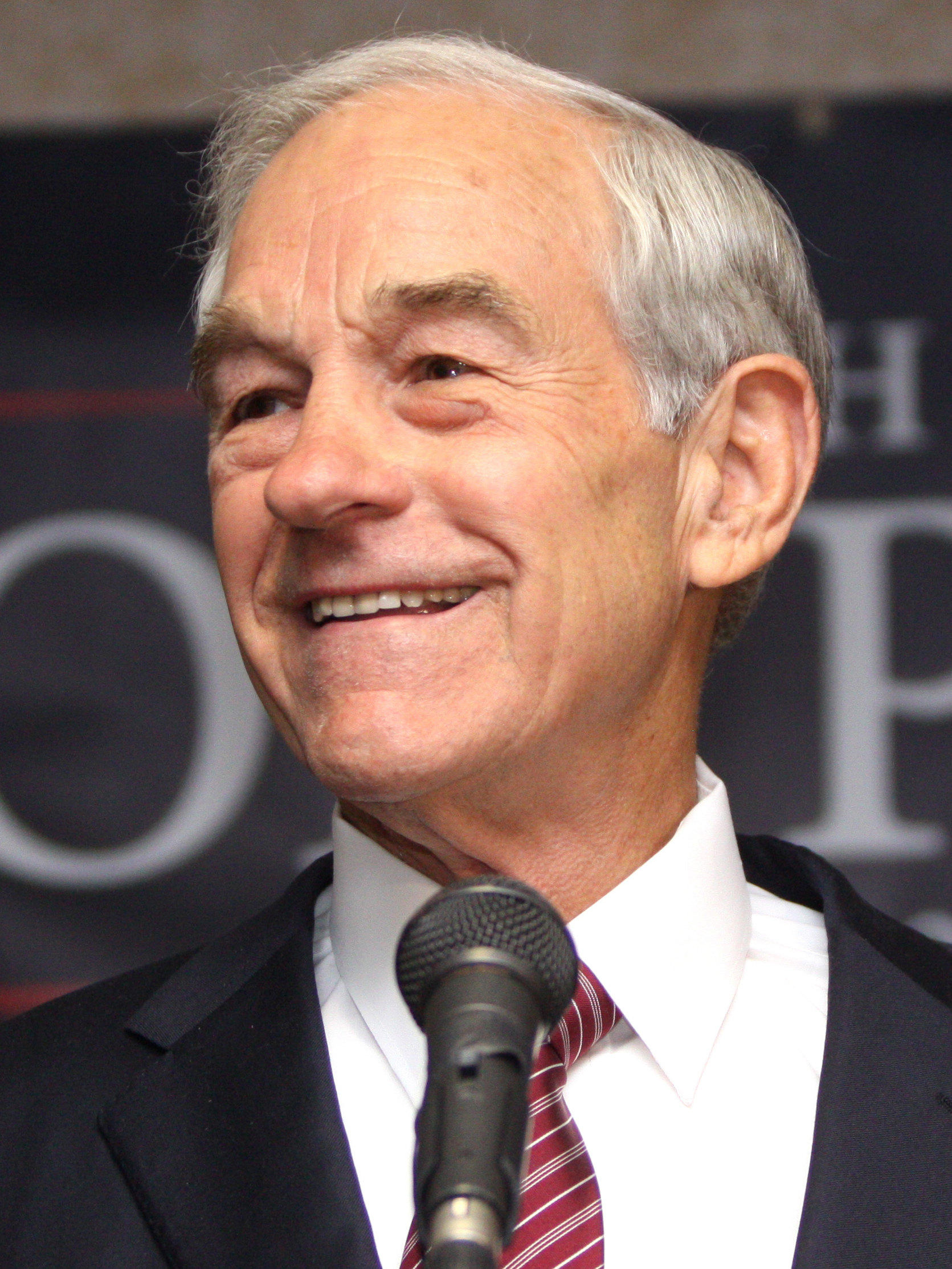

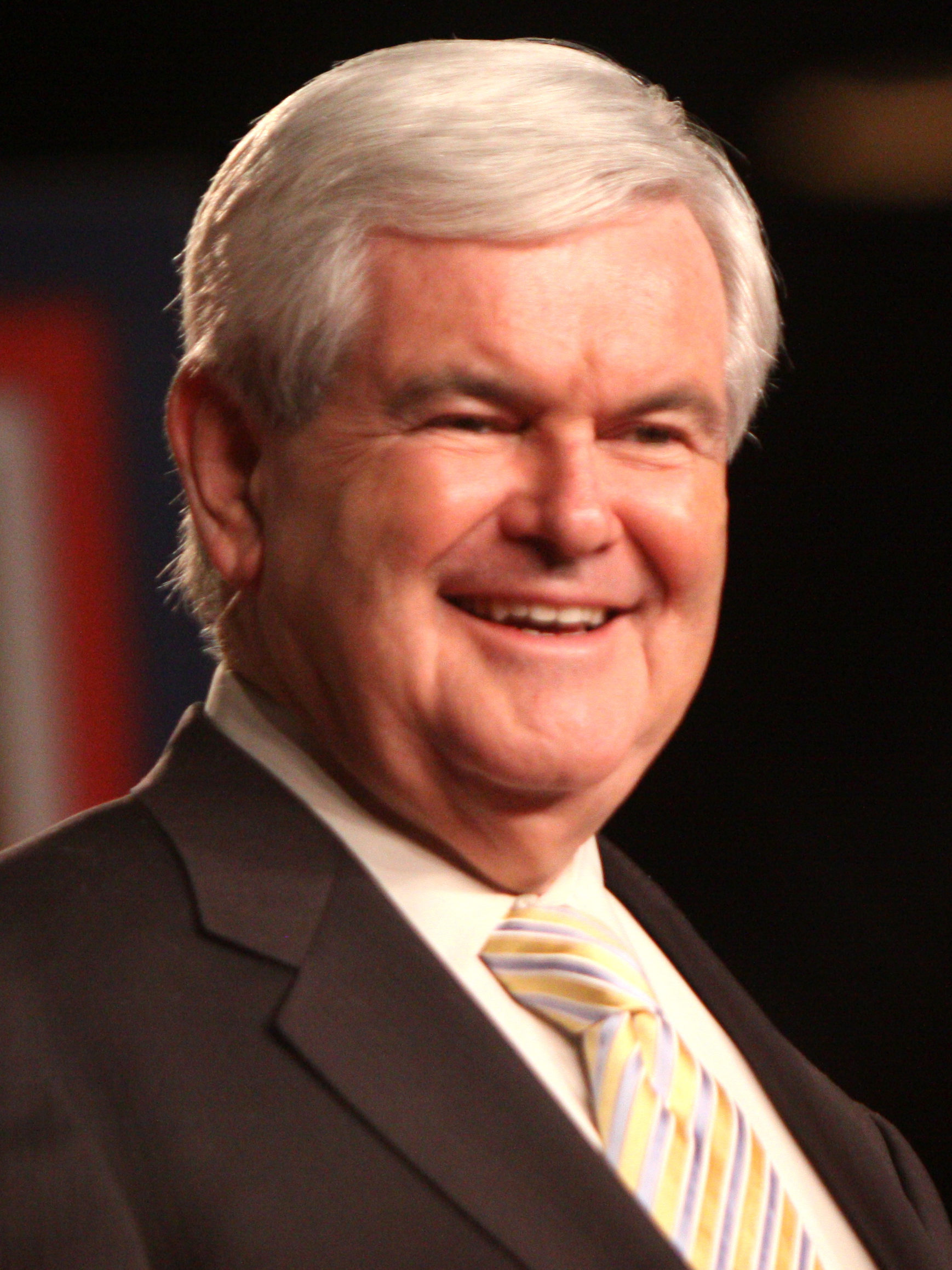
Candidate	Mitt Romney	Rick Santorum
Home state	Massachusetts	Pennsylvania
Delegate count	42	12
Popular vote	435,859	326,778
Percentage	46.69%	35.01%
Candidate	Ron Paul	Newt Gingrich
Home state	Texas	Georgia
Delegate count	0	0
Popular vote	87,044	74,482
Percentage	9.32%	7.98%
- County results Romney: 30–40% 40–50% 50–60% Santorum: 30–40% 40–50% 50–60% 60–70%

The 2012 Illinois Republican presidential primary was held on March 20, 2012, in the U.S. state of Illinois as one of the Republican Party's state primaries ahead of the 2012 presidential election. For the state-run primaries (Democratic and Republican), turnout was 21.72%, with 1,586,171 votes cast.

2012 Illinois Republican presidential primary
Candidate	Votes	Percentage	Projected delegate count		
Candidate	Votes	Percentage	NYT	CNN	FOX
Mitt Romney	435,859	46.69%	42	41	42
Rick Santorum	326,778	35.01%	12	10	12
Ron Paul	87,044	9.32%	0	0	0
Newt Gingrich	74,482	7.98%	0	0	0
Rick Perry (withdrawn)	5,568	0.60%	0	0	0
Buddy Roemer (withdrawn)	3,723	0.40%	0	0	0
Unprojected delegates:			0	3	0
Total:	933,454	100.00%	54	54	54

=== Green ===
2012 Illinois Green Party convention
- February 24, 2012

31 Green National Convention delegates
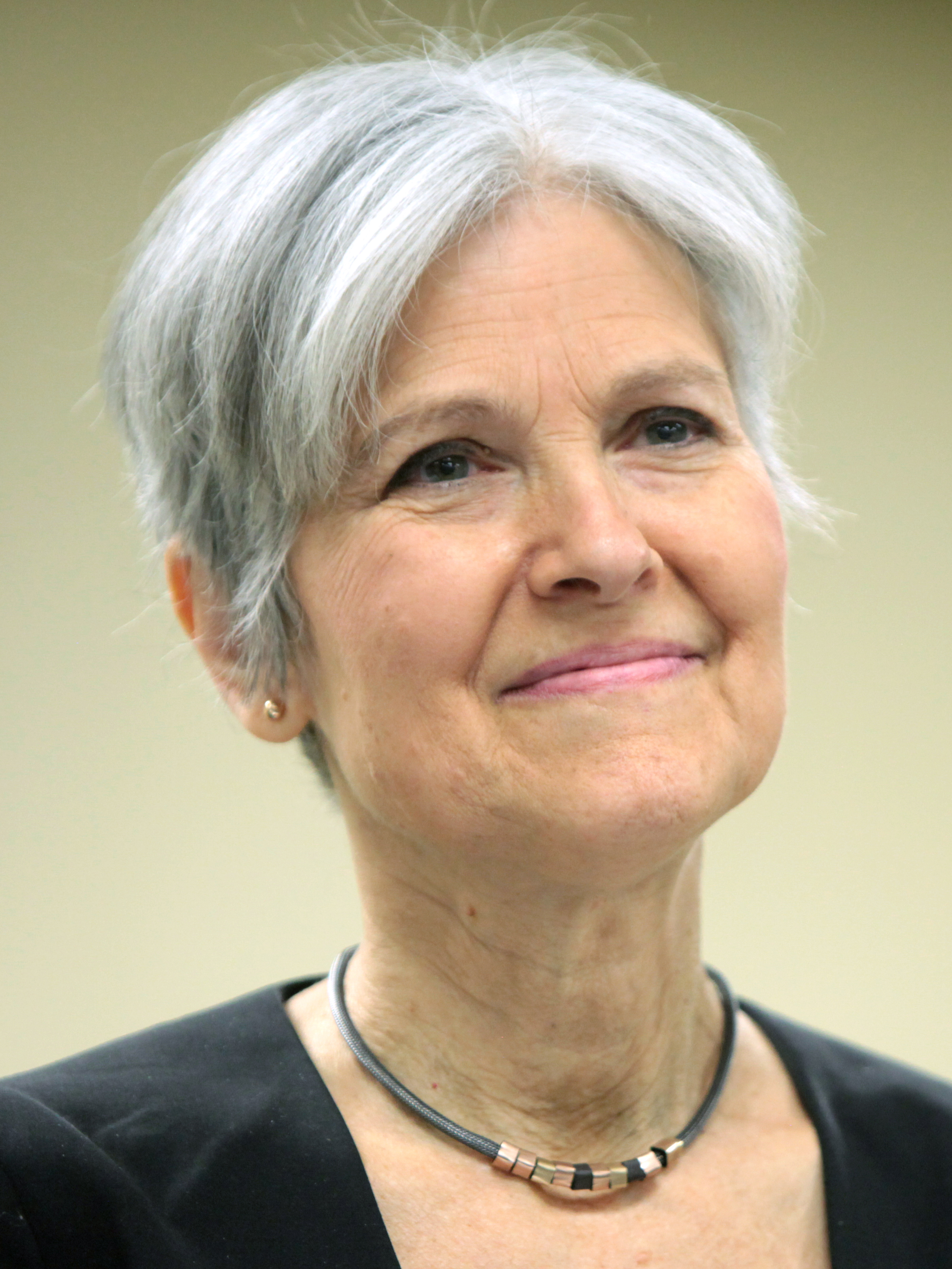

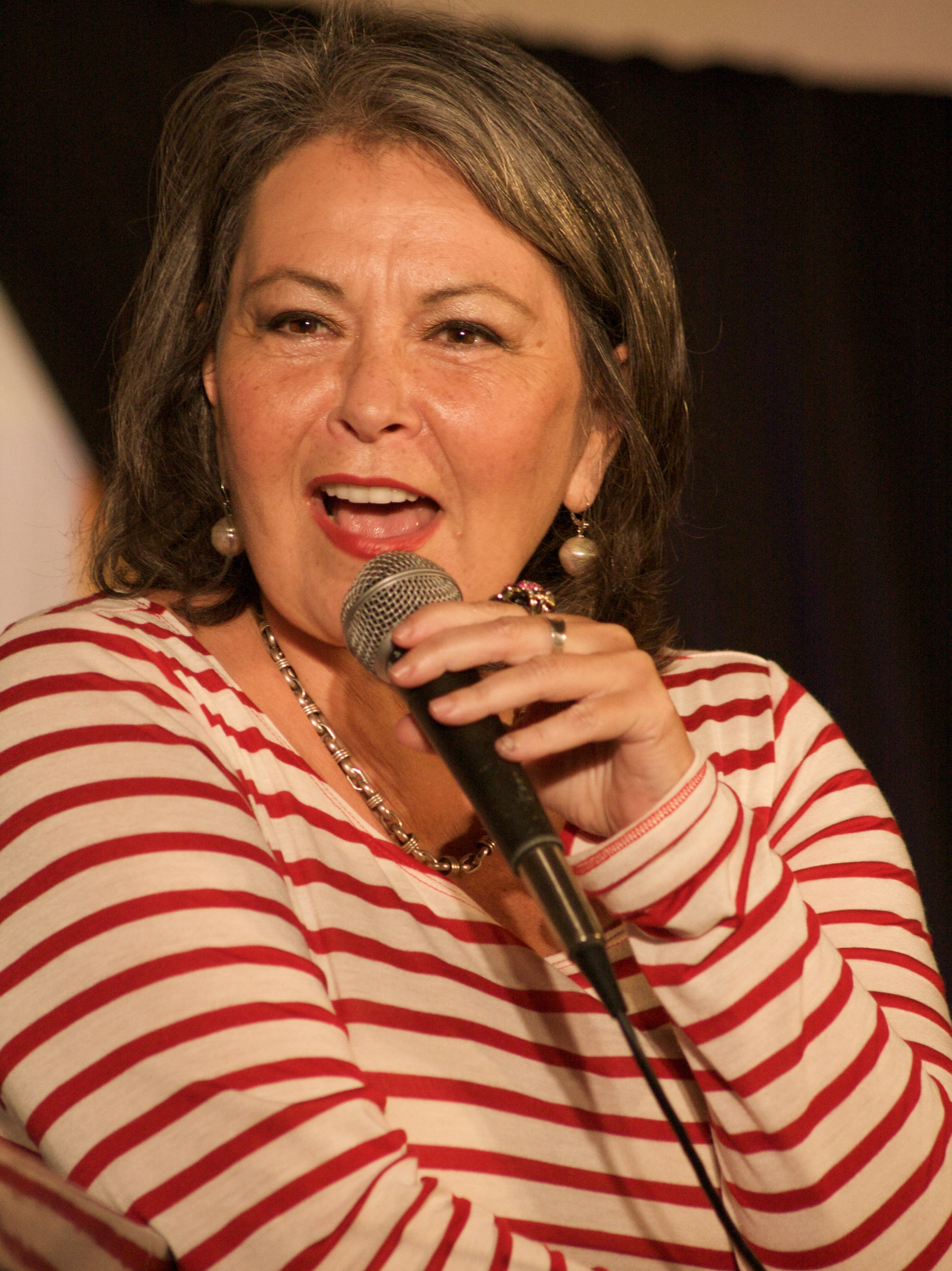

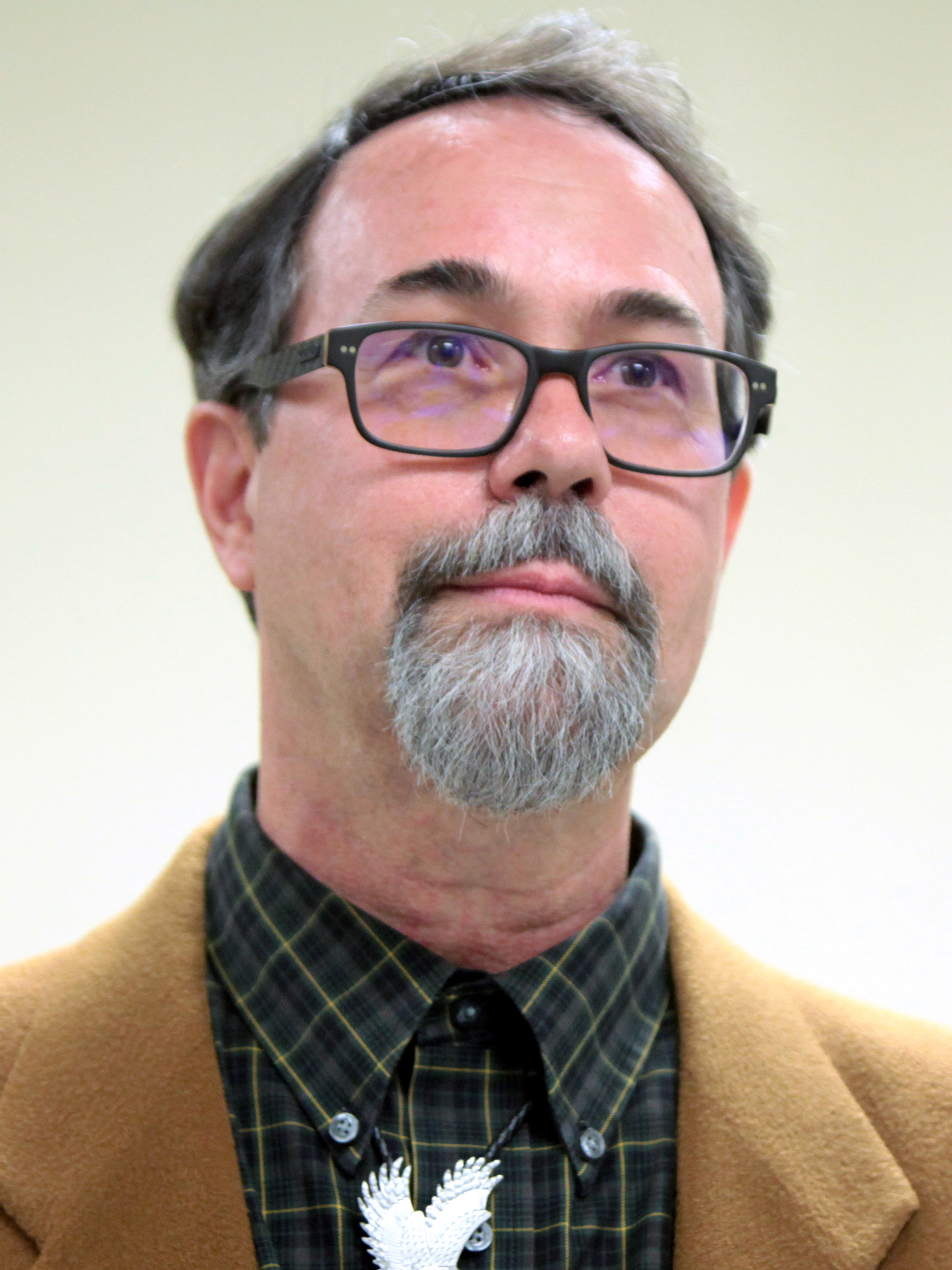
Candidate	Jill Stein	Roseanne Barr	Kent Mesplay
Party	Green	Green	Green
Home state	Massachusetts	Hawaii	California
Delegate count	22	2	2
Popular vote	109	27	8
Percentage	71.24%	17.65%	5.23%

The 2012 Illinois Green Party Convention was held on February 24, and saw a binding presidential preference vote cast, awarding delegates, as part of the Green Party's state primaries ahead of the 2012 presidential election.

Unlike the primaries for the major parties, this primary was run by the Green Party of Illinois itself, rather than by the state.

Illinois Green Party Primary, February 24, 2012
Candidate	Votes	Percentage	National delegates
Jill Stein	109	71.24%	22
Roseanne Barr (write-in)	27	17.65%	5
Kent Mesplay	8	5.23%	2
Uncommitted	8	5.23%	2
Others	1	0.65%	0
Total	153	100%	31

== General election ==
=== Predictions ===
Source	Ranking	As of
Huffington Post	Safe D	November 6, 2012
CNN	Safe D	November 6, 2012
New York Times	Safe D	November 6, 2012
Washington Post	Safe D	November 6, 2012
RealClearPolitics	Solid D	November 6, 2012
Sabato's Crystal Ball	Solid D	November 5, 2012
FiveThirtyEight	Solid D	November 6, 2012

=== Results ===
2012 United States presidential election in Illinois
Party	Candidate	Running mate	Votes	Percentage	Electoral votes
Democratic	Barack Obama (Incumbent)	Joe Biden (Incumbent)	3,019,512	57.60%	20
Republican	Mitt Romney	Paul Ryan	2,135,216	40.73%	0
Libertarian	Gary Johnson	James P. Gray	56,229	1.07%	0
Green	Jill Stein	Howie Hawkins	30,222	0.58%	0
Write-ins	Write-ins		835	0.02%	0
Totals			5,242,014	100.00%	20

==== By county ====
Chicago results by community area: Obama: 50–60%; 60–70%; 70–80%; 80–90%; 90–100%; Romney: 50–60%

County	Barack Obama Democratic		Mitt Romney Republican		Various candidates Other parties		Margin		Total votes cast
County	#	%	#	%	#	%	#	%	Total votes cast
Adams	9,648	31.43%	20,416	66.51%	633	2.06%	-10,768	-35.08%	30,697
Alexander	1,965	56.13%	1,487	42.47%	49	1.40%	478	13.66%	3,501
Bond	3,020	40.95%	4,095	55.53%	260	3.52%	-1,075	-14.58%	7,375
Boone	9,883	46.09%	11,096	51.75%	462	2.16%	-1,213	-5.66%	21,441
Brown	787	33.29%	1,513	64.00%	64	2.71%	-726	-30.71%	2,364
Bureau	8,134	48.75%	8,164	48.93%	388	2.32%	-30	-0.18%	16,686
Calhoun	1,080	41.93%	1,440	55.90%	56	2.17%	-360	-13.97%	2,576
Carroll	3,665	49.49%	3,555	48.00%	186	2.51%	110	1.49%	7,406
Cass	2,053	42.09%	2,707	55.49%	118	2.42%	-654	-13.40%	4,878
Champaign	40,831	51.94%	35,312	44.92%	2,466	3.14%	5,519	7.02%	78,609
Christian	5,494	37.31%	8,885	60.33%	348	2.36%	-3,391	-23.02%	14,727
Clark	2,591	32.86%	5,144	65.23%	151	1.91%	-2,553	-32.37%	7,886
Clay	1,584	26.81%	4,190	70.92%	134	2.27%	-2,606	-44.11%	5,908
Clinton	5,596	33.95%	10,524	63.86%	361	2.19%	-4,928	-29.91%	16,481
Coles	9,262	43.21%	11,631	54.26%	544	2.53%	-2,369	-11.05%	21,437
Cook	1,488,537	73.88%	495,542	24.59%	30,740	1.53%	992,995	49.29%	2,014,819
Crawford	2,858	33.11%	5,585	64.69%	190	2.20%	-2,727	-31.58%	8,633
Cumberland	1,641	30.99%	3,509	66.27%	145	2.74%	-1,868	-35.28%	5,295
DeKalb	21,207	51.42%	18,934	45.91%	1,100	2.67%	2,273	5.51%	41,241
DeWitt	2,601	35.30%	4,579	62.15%	188	2.55%	-1,978	-26.85%	7,368
Douglas	2,430	30.68%	5,334	67.34%	157	1.98%	-2,904	-36.66%	7,921
DuPage	199,460	49.73%	195,046	48.63%	6,575	1.64%	4,414	1.10%	401,081
Edgar	2,565	32.74%	5,132	65.50%	138	1.76%	-2,567	-32.76%	7,835
Edwards	754	23.36%	2,405	74.50%	69	2.14%	-1,651	-51.14%	3,228
Effingham	3,861	23.24%	12,501	75.25%	251	1.51%	-8,640	-52.01%	16,613
Fayette	2,853	31.66%	5,951	66.03%	208	2.31%	-3,098	-34.37%	9,012
Ford	1,656	27.49%	4,229	70.20%	139	2.31%	-2,573	-42.71%	6,024
Franklin	7,254	40.49%	10,267	57.31%	393	2.20%	-3,013	-16.82%	17,914
Fulton	8,328	54.04%	6,632	43.03%	451	2.93%	1,696	11.01%	15,411
Gallatin	1,029	39.99%	1,492	57.99%	52	2.02%	-463	-18.00%	2,573
Greene	2,023	35.89%	3,451	61.22%	163	2.89%	-1,428	-25.33%	5,637
Grundy	9,451	44.34%	11,343	53.22%	519	2.44%	-1,892	-8.88%	21,313
Hamilton	1,269	32.20%	2,566	65.11%	106	2.69%	-1,297	-32.91%	3,941
Hancock	3,650	40.06%	5,271	57.85%	190	2.09%	-1,621	-17.79%	9,111
Hardin	742	31.85%	1,535	65.88%	53	2.27%	-793	-34.03%	2,330
Henderson	1,978	55.44%	1,541	43.19%	49	1.37%	437	12.25%	3,568
Henry	12,332	50.53%	11,583	47.46%	490	2.01%	749	3.07%	24,405
Iroquois	3,413	26.64%	9,120	71.19%	278	2.17%	-5,707	-44.55%	12,811
Jackson	13,319	55.26%	9,864	40.92%	921	3.82%	3,455	14.34%	24,104
Jasper	1,436	28.48%	3,514	69.68%	93	1.84%	-2,078	-41.20%	5,043
Jefferson	6,089	37.31%	9,811	60.12%	420	2.57%	-3,722	-22.81%	16,320
Jersey	3,667	36.67%	6,039	60.38%	295	2.95%	-2,372	-23.71%	10,001
Jo Daviess	5,667	49.58%	5,534	48.42%	228	2.00%	133	1.16%	11,429
Johnson	1,572	27.61%	3,963	69.60%	159	2.79%	-2,391	-41.99%	5,694
Kane	90,332	49.71%	88,335	48.61%	3,058	1.68%	1,997	1.10%	181,725
Kankakee	21,595	47.30%	23,136	50.68%	923	2.02%	-1,541	-3.38%	45,654
Kendall	22,471	47.39%	24,047	50.71%	900	1.90%	-1,576	-3.32%	47,418
Knox	13,451	57.59%	9,408	40.28%	497	2.13%	4,043	17.31%	23,356
Lake	153,757	53.48%	129,764	45.14%	3,972	1.38%	23,993	8.34%	287,493
LaSalle	23,073	48.67%	23,256	49.06%	1,076	2.27%	-183	-0.39%	47,405
Lawrence	2,011	33.58%	3,857	64.40%	121	2.02%	-1,846	-30.82%	5,989
Lee	6,937	45.20%	8,059	52.51%	352	2.29%	-1,122	-7.31%	15,348
Livingston	5,020	33.30%	9,753	64.69%	304	2.01%	-4,733	-31.39%	15,077
Logan	3,978	32.91%	7,844	64.89%	266	2.20%	-3,866	-31.98%	12,088
Macon	22,780	46.46%	25,309	51.62%	941	1.92%	-2,529	-5.16%	49,030
Macoupin	9,464	44.89%	10,946	51.92%	673	3.19%	-1,482	-7.03%	21,083
Madison	58,922	47.95%	60,608	49.32%	3,355	2.73%	-1,686	-1.37%	122,885
Marion	6,225	39.35%	9,248	58.46%	347	2.19%	-3,023	-19.11%	15,820
Marshall	2,455	41.83%	3,290	56.06%	124	2.11%	-835	-14.23%	5,869
Mason	2,867	45.54%	3,265	51.86%	164	2.60%	-398	-6.32%	6,296
Massac	2,092	32.21%	4,278	65.87%	125	1.92%	-2,186	-33.66%	6,495
McDonough	5,967	47.91%	6,147	49.36%	340	2.73%	-180	-1.45%	12,454
McHenry	59,797	44.55%	71,598	53.34%	2,842	2.11%	-11,801	-8.79%	134,237
McLean	31,883	43.40%	39,947	54.37%	1,639	2.23%	-8,064	-10.97%	73,469
Menard	2,100	34.14%	3,948	64.18%	103	1.68%	-1,848	-30.04%	6,151
Mercer	4,507	52.60%	3,876	45.24%	185	2.16%	631	7.36%	8,568
Monroe	6,215	35.53%	10,888	62.24%	391	2.23%	-4,673	-26.71%	17,494
Montgomery	5,058	41.50%	6,776	55.60%	354	2.90%	-1,718	-14.10%	12,188
Morgan	5,806	41.06%	7,972	56.37%	364	2.57%	-2,166	-15.31%	14,142
Moultrie	2,144	35.29%	3,784	62.29%	147	2.42%	-1,640	-27.00%	6,075
Ogle	9,514	40.72%	13,422	57.44%	431	1.84%	-3,908	-16.72%	23,367
Peoria	40,209	51.28%	36,774	46.90%	1,428	1.82%	3,435	4.38%	78,411
Perry	3,819	39.99%	5,507	57.67%	223	2.34%	-1,688	-17.68%	9,549
Piatt	3,090	35.35%	5,413	61.92%	239	2.73%	-2,323	-26.57%	8,742
Pike	2,278	31.20%	4,860	66.56%	164	2.24%	-2,582	-35.36%	7,302
Pope	650	29.25%	1,512	68.05%	60	2.70%	-862	-38.80%	2,222
Pulaski	1,389	46.12%	1,564	51.93%	59	1.95%	-175	-5.81%	3,012
Putnam	1,559	49.60%	1,502	47.79%	82	2.61%	57	1.81%	3,143
Randolph	5,759	39.89%	8,290	57.42%	389	2.69%	-2,531	-17.53%	14,438
Richland	2,362	32.44%	4,756	65.31%	164	2.25%	-2,394	-32.87%	7,282
Rock Island	39,157	60.04%	24,934	38.23%	1,126	1.73%	14,223	21.81%	65,217
Saline	3,701	34.52%	6,806	63.49%	213	1.99%	-3,105	-28.97%	10,720
Sangamon	42,107	44.65%	50,225	53.26%	1,965	2.09%	-8,118	-8.61%	94,297
Schuyler	1,727	44.26%	2,069	53.02%	106	2.72%	-342	-8.76%	3,902
Scott	910	35.44%	1,587	61.80%	71	2.76%	-677	-26.36%	2,568
Shelby	3,342	32.01%	6,843	65.55%	254	2.44%	-3,501	-33.54%	10,439
St. Clair	67,285	56.15%	50,125	41.83%	2,417	2.02%	17,160	14.32%	119,827
Stark	1,095	41.13%	1,528	57.40%	39	1.47%	-433	-16.27%	2,662
Stephenson	10,165	48.11%	10,512	49.75%	451	2.14%	-347	-1.64%	21,128
Tazewell	24,438	39.88%	35,335	57.66%	1,509	2.46%	-10,897	-17.78%	61,282
Union	3,137	37.71%	4,957	59.59%	224	2.70%	-1,820	-21.88%	8,318
Vermilion	12,878	42.36%	16,892	55.57%	630	2.07%	-4,014	-13.21%	30,400
Wabash	1,590	30.97%	3,478	67.74%	66	1.29%	-1,888	-36.77%	5,134
Warren	4,044	51.73%	3,618	46.28%	156	1.99%	426	5.45%	7,818
Washington	2,450	32.95%	4,792	64.45%	193	2.60%	-2,342	-31.50%	7,435
Wayne	1,514	19.67%	5,988	77.80%	195	2.53%	-4,474	-58.13%	7,697
White	2,188	30.90%	4,731	66.80%	163	2.30%	-2,543	-35.90%	7,082
Whiteside	14,833	57.43%	10,448	40.45%	547	2.12%	4,385	16.98%	25,828
Will	144,229	51.85%	128,969	46.36%	4,967	1.79%	15,260	5.49%	278,165
Williamson	10,647	36.40%	17,909	61.22%	698	2.38%	-7,262	-24.82%	29,254
Winnebago	61,732	51.70%	55,138	46.18%	2,527	2.12%	6,594	5.52%	119,397
Woodford	5,572	29.42%	12,961	68.44%	405	2.14%	-7,389	-39.02%	18,938
Totals	3,019,512	57.50%	2,135,216	40.66%	96,704	1.84%	884,296	16.84%	5,251,432

Counties that flipped from Democratic to Republican

- Boone (largest city: Belvidere)
- Bureau (largest city: Princeton)
- Calhoun (largest village: Hardin)
- Cass (largest city: Beardstown)
- Coles (largest city: Charleston)
- Gallatin (largest city: Shawneetown)
- Grundy (largest city: Morris)
- Kankakee (largest city: Kankakee)
- Kendall (largest village: Oswego)
- LaSalle (largest city: Ottawa)
- Macon (largest city: Decatur)
- Mason (largest city: Havana)
- Macoupin (largest city: Carlinville)
- Madison (largest city: Granite City)
- McDonough (largest city: Macomb)
- McHenry (largest city: Crystal Lake)
- McLean (largest city: Bloomington)
- Montgomery (largest city: Litchfield)
- Pulaski (largest city: Mounds)
- Sangamon (largest city: Springfield)
- Schuyler (largest city: Rushville)
- Stephenson (largest city: Freeport)
- Vermilion (largest city: Danville)

==== By congressional district ====
Obama won 12 of 18 congressional districts.

District	Romney	Obama	Representative
1st	20.25%	78.94%	Bobby Rush
2nd	18.53%	80.7%	Jesse Jackson Jr.
3rd	42.98%	55.93%	Dan Lipinski
4th	17.06%	80.9%	Luis Gutierrez
5th	31.81%	66%	Mike Quigley
6th	53.31%	45.1%	Peter Roskam
7th	11.79%	87.22%	Danny K. Davis
8th	40.94%	57.39%	Tammy Duckworth
9th	33.29%	65%	Jan Schakowsky
10th	41.14%	57.52%	Brad Schneider
11th	40.64%	57.82%	Bill Foster
12th	48.13%	49.74%	William Enyart
13th	48.95%	48.64%	Rodney Davis
14th	54.2%	44.18%	Randy Hultgren
15th	63.94%	34.06%	John Shimkus
16th	52.89%	45.17%	Adam Kinzinger
17th	40.64%	57.58%	Cheri Bustos
18th	60.66%	37.4%	Aaron Schock

== Analysis ==
While Obama only won 23% of the counties in Illinois, most of the counties he won were heavily populated. His 17-point victory is attributed to his landslide performance in Cook County where he received 73.88% of the vote and victories in the once Republican-favored collar counties (DuPage, Will and Lake). He also performed well in the East St. Louis area. Cook County, which encompasses the Chicago Metropolitan Area, provides a crucial advantage for the Democratic Party. If Cook County's vote were excluded, Romney would have won the state with 1,639,684 to Obama's 1,530,975.

Calhoun and Madison counties voted Republican for the first time since 1984. As of the 2024 presidential election, this is the last time a Democrat has won Alexander, Carroll, Fulton, Henderson, Henry, Jo Daviess, Knox, Mercer, Putnam, Warren and Whiteside counties. Also, as a result of this election, Clark, Clay, Effingham, Edwards, Iroquois, Jasper, Massac, Richland, Wabash and Wayne are the only counties in the state that never voted for Obama in his two runs for the presidency or in his landslide election to the Senate.

== See also ==
- United States presidential elections in Illinois
- Illinois Republican Party
- 2012 Republican Party presidential debates and forums
- 2012 Republican Party presidential primaries
- Results of the 2012 Republican Party presidential primaries
