= Roseanne Barr =

American actress and comedian (born 1952)

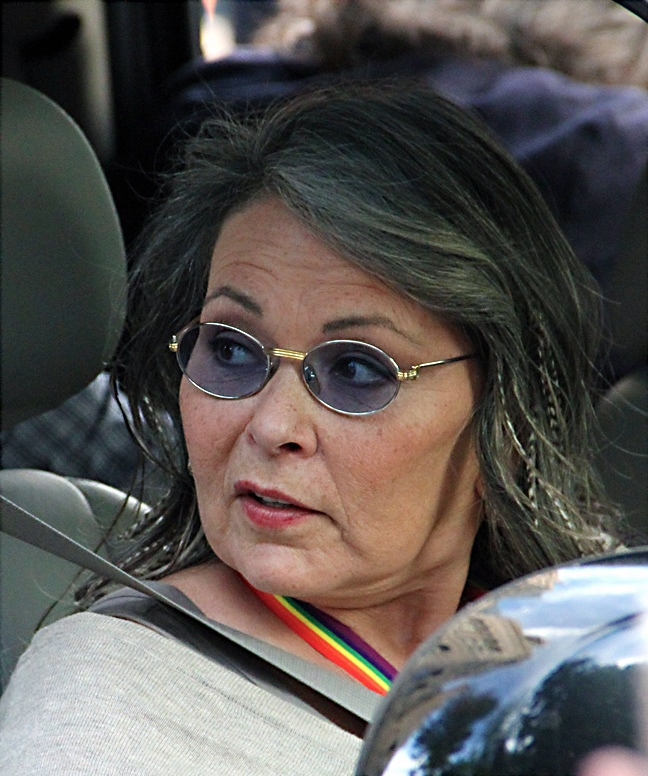
- Barr in 2011
- Born: Roseanne Cherrie Barr; November 3, 1952 (age 74); Salt Lake City, Utah, U.S.
- Occupations: Actress, comedian, writer, producer
- Years active: 1970–present
- Political party: Peace and Freedom (2012–2013); Green (2008–2012); Democratic (1970–2008)
- Spouses: Bill Pentland (m. 1974; div. 1990); Tom Arnold (m. 1990; div. 1994); Ben Thomas (m. 1995; div. 2002)
- Partner: Johnny Argent (2003–present)
- Children: 5
- Website: www.roseannebarr.com

Roseanne Cherrie Barr (born November 3, 1952), also known mononymously as Roseanne, is an American actress, comedian, writer, and producer. She began her career in stand-up comedy, going on to achieve widespread recognition for her work as the eponymous lead character on the ABC sitcom Roseanne (1988–1997; 2018), for which she received an Emmy and a Golden Globe.

Having been revived in 2018 to strong ratings, plans for further seasons of Roseanne were dropped after Barr made a tweet condemned as racist by many commentators, with Barr later referring to the tweet as a "bad joke." Her comeback comedy special, Cancel This!, was released on Fox Nation in 2023.

== Early life ==
Barr was born in Salt Lake City, Utah, to a Jewish family. She is the oldest of four children born to Helen (née Davis), a bookkeeper and cashier, and Jerome Hershel "Jerry" Barr, a salesman. Her father's family were Jewish emigrants from the Russian Empire, and her maternal grandparents were Jewish emigrants from Austria-Hungary and Lithuania. Her paternal grandfather changed his surname from "Borisofsky" to "Barr" upon entering the United States. Barr's great-grandparents were murdered during the Holocaust.

Her Jewish upbringing was influenced by her devoutly Orthodox Jewish maternal grandmother. Barr's parents kept their Jewish heritage secret from their neighbors and were partially involved in the Church of Jesus Christ of Latter-day Saints. Barr has stated, "Friday, Saturday, and Sunday morning I was a Jew; Sunday afternoon, Tuesday afternoon, and Wednesday afternoon we were Mormons."

When Barr was three, she was afflicted with Bell's palsy on the left side of her face. She said, "[so] my mother called in a rabbi to pray for me, but nothing happened. Then my mother got a Mormon preacher, he prayed, and I was miraculously cured". Years later, she learned that Bell's palsy was usually temporary and that the Mormon elder came "exactly at the right time".

Barr has stated that she is on the autism spectrum. At six years old, she discovered her first public stage by lecturing at LDS churches around Utah and was elected president of a Mormon youth group.

She attended East High School. At age 16, Barr was hit by a car, and the car's hood ornament impaled her skull; the incident left her with a traumatic brain injury. Her behavior changed so radically that she was institutionalized for eight months at Utah State Hospital.

In 1970, when Barr was 18, she moved out by informing her parents that she was going to visit a friend in Colorado for two weeks, and never returned.

The following year, Barr had a baby, whom she put up for adoption. She and her daughter amicably reunited 17 years later.

== Career ==
=== Stand-up comedian: 1980–1986 ===
While in Colorado, Barr began doing stand-up gigs in clubs in Denver and other Colorado towns. She later tried out at The Comedy Store in Los Angeles, and went on to appear on The Tonight Show in 1985.

In 1986, she performed on a Rodney Dangerfield special and on Late Night with David Letterman, and the following year had her own HBO special called The Roseanne Barr Show, which earned her an American Comedy Award for the funniest female performer in a television special.

Barr was offered the role of Peg Bundy in Married... with Children, but turned it down. In her routine she popularized the phrase "domestic goddess" to refer to a homemaker or housewife. The success of her act led to her own series on ABC, called Roseanne.

=== Roseanne sitcom, film, books, and talk show: 1987–2004 ===
In 1987, The Cosby Show executive producers Marcy Carsey and Tom Werner wanted to bring a "no-perks family comedy" to television. They hired Cosby writer Matt Williams to write a script about factory workers and signed Barr to play Roseanne Conner.

The October 18, 1988, premiere of the show was watched by 21.4 million households, making it the highest-rated debut of that season.

Barr became outraged when she watched the first episode of Roseanne and noticed that in the credits, Williams was listed as creator. She told Tanner Stransky of Entertainment Weekly, "We built the show around my actual life and my kids. The 'domestic goddess', the whole thing." In the same interview, Werner said, "I don't think Roseanne, to this day, understands that this is something legislated by the Writers Guild, and it's part of what every show has to deal with. They're the final arbiters."

During the first season, Barr sought more creative control over the show, opposing Williams' authority. Barr refused to say certain lines and eventually walked off set. She threatened to quit the show if Williams did not leave. ABC let Williams go after the thirteenth episode. Barr gave Amy Sherman-Palladino and Joss Whedon their first writing jobs on Roseanne.

Roseanne ran for nine seasons from 1988 to 1997. Barr won an Emmy, a Golden Globe, a Kids' Choice Award, and three American Comedy Awards for her part in the show. Barr had crafted a "fierce working-class domestic goddess" persona in the eight years preceding her sitcom and wanted to do a realistic show about a strong mother "who was not a victim of patriarchal consumerism."

For the final two seasons, Barr earned $40 million, making her the second-highest-paid woman in show business at the time, after Oprah Winfrey.

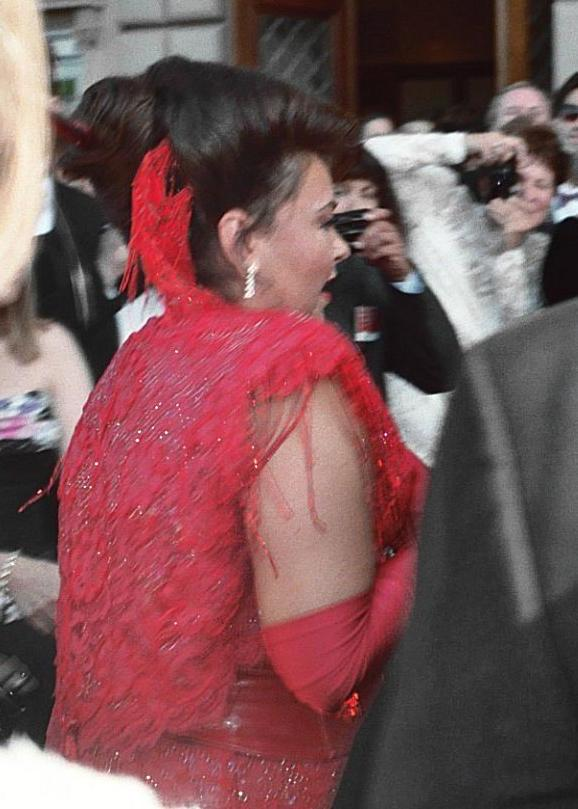
Barr attending the 1992 Emmy Awards

Barbara Ehrenreich called Barr a working-class spokesperson representing "the hopeless underclass of the female sex: polyester-clad, overweight occupants of the slow track; fast-food waitresses, factory workers, housewives, members of the invisible pink-collar army; the despised, the jilted, the underpaid", but a master of "the kind of class-militant populism that the Democrats, most of them anyway, never seem to get right." Barr reportedly refused to use the term "blue collar" because she felt it masks the issue of class.

During Roseanne's final season, Barr was in negotiations between Carsey-Werner Productions and ABC executives to continue playing Roseanne Conner in a spin-off. After failed discussions with ABC as well as CBS and Fox, Carsey-Werner and Barr agreed not to continue the negotiations.

She released her autobiography in 1989, titled Roseanne—My Life As a Woman. That same year, she made her film debut in She-Devil, playing a scorned housewife, Ruth. Film critic Roger Ebert gave her a positive review saying, "Barr could have made an easy, predictable and dumb comedy at any point in the last couple of years. Instead, she took her chances with an ambitious project—a real movie. It pays off, in that Barr demonstrates that there is a core of reality inside her TV persona, a core of identifiable human feelings like jealousy and pride, and they provide a sound foundation for her comic acting."

In 1991, she voiced the baby Julie in Look Who's Talking Too. She was nominated for a Golden Raspberry Award for Worst Supporting Actress.

She appeared three times on Saturday Night Live from 1991 to 1994, co-hosting with then-husband Tom Arnold in 1992.

In 1994, she released a second book, My Lives. That same year, Barr became the first female comedian to host the MTV Video Music Awards on her own. She remained the only one to have done so until comedian Chelsea Handler hosted in 2010. In 1997, she made guest appearances on 3rd Rock from the Sun and The Nanny.

In 1998, she portrayed the Wicked Witch of the West in a production of The Wizard of Oz at Madison Square Garden. That same year, Barr hosted her own talk show, The Roseanne Show, which ran for two years before it was canceled in 2000.

In the summer of 2003, she took on the dual role of hosting a cooking show called Domestic Goddess and starring in a reality show called The Real Roseanne Show about hosting a cooking show. Although 13 episodes were in production, a hysterectomy brought a premature end to both projects.

In 2004, she voiced Maggie, one of the main characters in the animated film Home on the Range.

=== Return to stand-up, television guest appearances, and radio: 2005–2010 ===
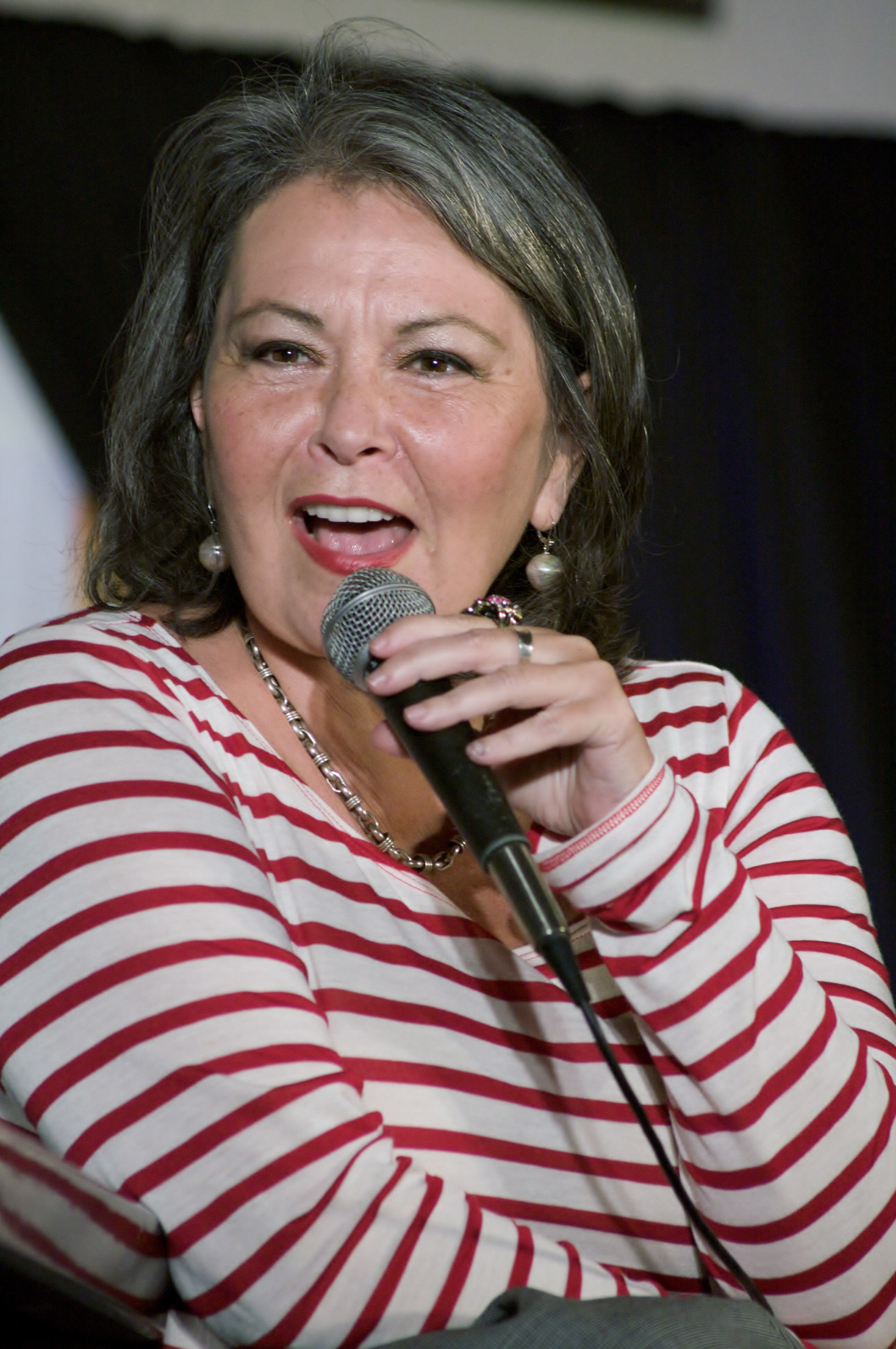
Barr in 2010

In 2005, she returned to stand-up comedy with a world tour and in February 2006, Barr performed her first dates in Europe as part of the Leicester Comedy Festival, England. She released her first children's DVD, Rockin' with Roseanne: Calling All Kids, that month. Barr's return to the stage culminated in an HBO Comedy Special Roseanne Barr: Blonde N Bitchin, which aired November 2006, on HBO. Two nights earlier, Barr had returned to primetime network TV with a guest spot on NBC's My Name Is Earl, playing a crazy trailer park manager.

In April 2007, Barr hosted season three of The Search for the Funniest Mom in America on Nick at Nite and in 2008, she headlined an act at the Sahara Hotel and Casino on the Las Vegas Strip.

From 2008 to 2013, she and partner Johnny Argent hosted a weekly radio show on Sundays, on KCAA in the Los Angeles area, called "The Roseanne and Johnny Show". From 2009 to 2010, she hosted a politically themed radio show on KPFK.

In April 2009, Barr made an appearance on Bravo's 2nd Annual A-List Awards in the opening scenes. She played Kathy Griffin's fairy godmother, granting her wish to be on the A-List for one night only. In February 2010, Barr headlined the inaugural Traverse City Comedy Arts Festival in a project of the Traverse City Film Festival. Barr appeared in Jordan Brady's documentary about stand-up comedy, I Am Comic.

=== Reality television, Roseanne revival and new comedy special: 2011–present ===
In January 2011, Barr released her third book, Roseannearchy: Dispatches from the Nut Farm.

In 2011, she appeared in a Super Bowl XLV commercial for Snickers along with comedian Richard Lewis. It was the most popular ad, based on the number of TiVo users rewinding and watching it over.

On July 13, 2011, Roseanne's Nuts, a reality show featuring Barr, boyfriend Johnny Argent, and son Jake as they run a macadamia nut and livestock farm on the Big Island of Hawaii, premiered on Lifetime, but was canceled in September of that year.

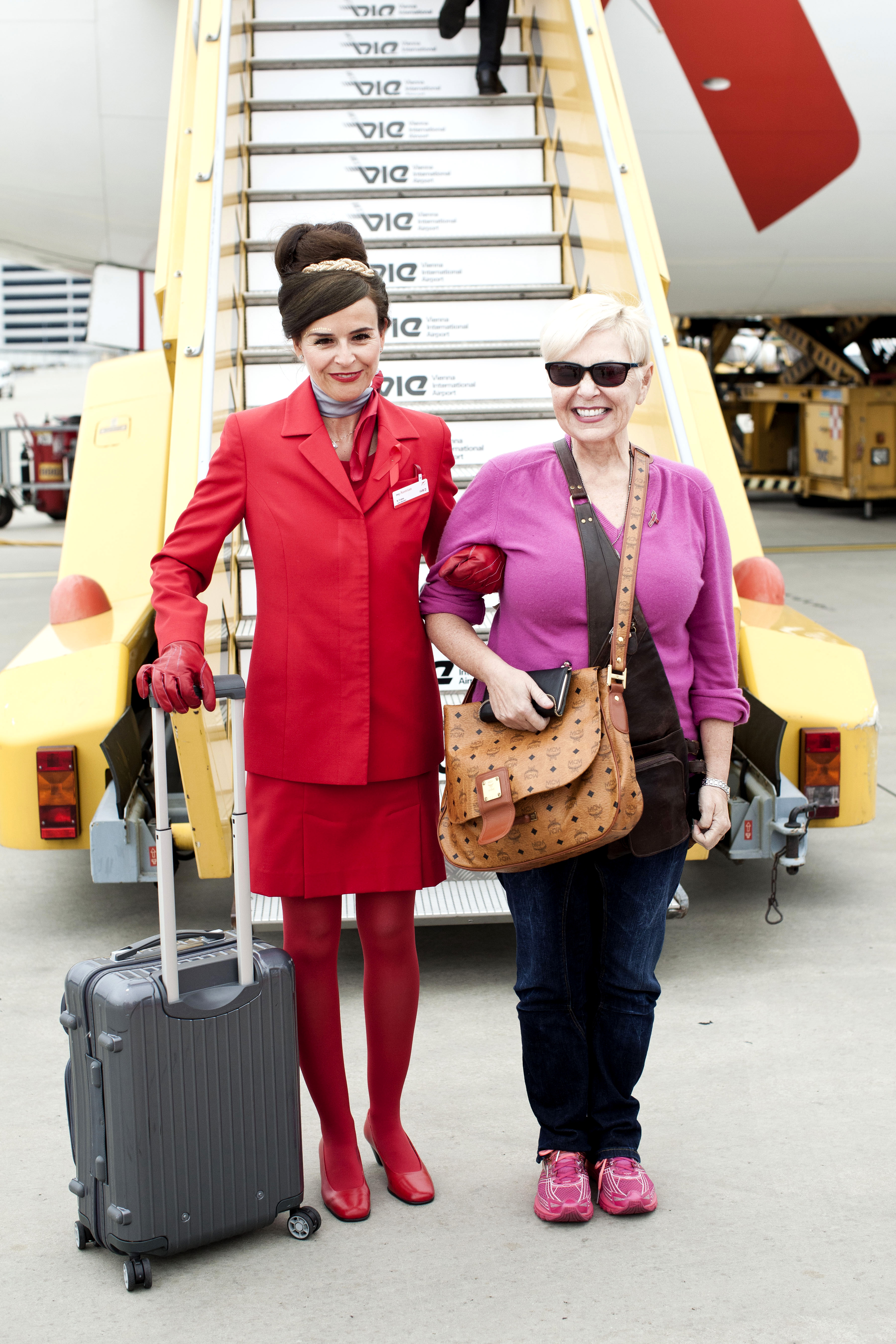
Barr at the Life Ball in 2015

In August 2011, it was reported that Barr was working on a new sitcom with 20th Century Fox Television titled Downwardly Mobile. Eric Gilliland was attached as co-creator, writer and executive producer; Gilliland was also a writer on Roseanne. In October 2011, NBC picked up the show but later dropped it. A pilot was filmed but initially ended up being shelved by the network. Barr called her progressive politics the sole reason behind the pilot's rejection. She said she was notified that the show would not be picked up due to its being labeled "too polarizing" by network executives.

Barr was roasted by Comedy Central in August 2012. After stating that he would not, Barr's former spouse Tom Arnold appeared on the roast.

In the summer of 2014 Barr joined Keenen Ivory Wayans and Russell Peters as a judge on Last Comic Standing on NBC.

On November 28, 2014, Barr's series, Momsters: When Moms Go Bad debuted on the Investigation Discovery cable network, a network that she says she's a "little obsessed with". Barr hosts the show as herself.

On March 27, 2018, the revived, 10th season of Roseanne with the original cast premiered on ABC to high ratings. On March 30, 2018, ABC renewed the series for an 11th season, with thirteen episodes. On May 29, 2018, the series was canceled by ABC in the aftermath of a tweet widely considered to be racist. Barr and Tom Werner later came to an agreement on relinquishing her producer's stake in a spin-off titled The Conners, which ABC ordered for the fall season soon after.

In September 2022, it was announced that Barr would appear in a new comedy special, titled Cancel This! It was released on the streaming service Fox Nation on February 13, 2023.

On November 30, 2023, it was announced that Barr would star in an adult animated comedy series for The Daily Wire, titled Mr. Birchum, which was released in 2024.

== Personal life ==
=== Relationships and children ===
Barr has been married three times and has five children. In 1970, when she was 17, she had a child, Brandi Ann Brown, whom she placed for adoption; they were later reunited. On February 4, 1974, Barr married Bill Pentland, a motel clerk she met while in Colorado. They had three children: Jessica, Jennifer, and Jake. They divorced on January 16, 1990. Four days later, on January 20, 1990, Barr married fellow comedian Tom Arnold and became known as Roseanne Arnold during the marriage. Barr had met Arnold in 1983 in Minneapolis, where he opened for her stand-up comedy act. In 1988, Barr brought Arnold onto her sitcom, Roseanne, as a writer.

Barr filed for divorce from Arnold on April 18, 1994 in the Superior Court of Los Angeles County, citing irreconcilable differences. Their efforts to have children were unsuccessful.

On February 14, 1995, Barr married Ben Thomas, her one-time personal security guard, at Caesars Tahoe with a reception at Planet Hollywood. In November 1994, she became pregnant through in vitro fertilization and they had a son named Buck. The couple stayed together until 2002.

In 2002, Barr met Johnny Argent online after running a writing competition on her blog, and began dating him in 2003, after a year of phone conversations. They lived on a 46-acre (19-hectare) macadamia nut farm on the Big Island of Hawaii, which Barr purchased in 2007 for $1.78 million. Barr sold the property in October 2025 for $2.6 million and moved to Texas Hill Country. Barr has studied Kabbalah at the Kabbalah Centre and frequently comments on the discipline.

=== Family conflicts ===
Barr's sister Geraldine is a lesbian and her brother Ben is gay. Barr has said that this inspired her to introduce gay characters into her sitcom and to support same-sex marriage.

Geraldine worked as Barr's manager during the early part of her career and clashed with Barr's second husband, Tom Arnold. Barr fired Geraldine, leading Geraldine to file a $70.3 million breach of contract lawsuit in Superior Court of Los Angeles County on December 18, 1991. She said Barr promised her half the earnings from the Roseanne show as recompense for helping invent the "domestic goddess" character in 1981, and for serving as "writer, organizer, accountant, bookkeeper and confidante". Since the statute of limitations had expired, the suit was thrown out.

In a 1991 interview with People, Barr described herself as an incest survivor, accusing both of her parents of physical and sexual abuse, claims which they and Geraldine publicly denied. Melvin Belli, her parents' lawyer, said they had passed a polygraph test "with flying colors". Barr was part of an incest recovery group, something she said her parents knew about but for which they were "in denial".

On February 14, 2011, Barr and Geraldine appeared on The Oprah Winfrey Show where Barr admitted the word "incest" could have been the wrong word to use and that she should have waited until her therapy was over before revealing the "darkest time" in her life. She told Oprah Winfrey, "I was in a very unhappy relationship and I was prescribed numerous psychiatric drugs ... to deal with the fact that I had some mental illness ... I totally lost touch with reality ... (and) I didn't know what the truth was ... I just wanted to drop a bomb on my family". She added that not everything was "made up", saying, "Nobody accuses their parents of abusing them without justification". Geraldine said they had not spoken for 12 years, but had reconciled.

=== Health problems ===
In the mid-1990s, Barr had multiple cosmetic surgeries performed, such as a breast reduction, tummy tuck, and a nose job. During the late 1990s, she had gastric bypass surgery.

In 1994, Roseanne announced that she had dissociative identity disorder caused by childhood abuse. She had personalities named Baby, Cindy, Evangelina, Fucker, Heather, Joey, Kevin, Nobody, Somebody, and Susan as well as her main personality, Roseanne. By 2001, she claimed the personalities had mostly fused into one after 10 years of therapy.

In 2015, Barr revealed she had been diagnosed with both macular degeneration and glaucoma, and thus was gradually losing her eyesight and expected to eventually go blind. She consumed medical marijuana to decrease her high intraocular pressure (a feature of the diseases). Barr later revealed that she was misdiagnosed and that her vision problem is really due to a mole resting behind her eye, which could be corrected through surgery. In November 2018, Barr was said to have had a heart attack, but she later stated on social media that she was not experiencing any medical issues.

== Controversies ==
=== National anthem ===
On July 25, 1990, Barr performed "The Star-Spangled Banner" off-key before a baseball game between the San Diego Padres and Cincinnati Reds at Jack Murphy Stadium. She later said she was singing as loudly as possible to hear herself over the public-address system, so her rendition of the song sounded "screechy". Following her rendition, she mimicked the often-seen actions of players by spitting and grabbing her crotch as if adjusting a protective cup. Barr later said that the Padres had suggested she "bring humor to the song", but many criticized the performance, including then President George H. W. Bush, who called her rendition "disgraceful".

=== Hitler photoshoot ===
Barr elicited criticism in July 2009 when she posed as Adolf Hitler in a feature for the satirical Jewish publication Heeb magazine called "That Oven Feelin'". The Nazi theme was her suggestion, and featured her with a Hitler mustache and swastika arm-band, holding a tray of burnt gingerbread man cookies the article referred to as "burnt Jew cookies". The magazine's publisher, Josh Neuman, said the photos were taken for satire and were not done for shock value. Barr, who is Jewish, said she was "making fun of Hitler, not his victims". Fox News TV host Bill O'Reilly was highly critical of her for "mocking the Holocaust" and Extra's Mario Lopez stated "Come on, Roseanne. Hitler jokes are never funny." The revival of her show in March 2018 caused the photos to resurface on social media and renewed mentions of the incident in the Jewish magazine The Forward and the Los Angeles Times, among others.

=== Zimmerman and Parkland shooting tweets ===
In 2014, the parents of George Zimmerman, the man known for fatally shooting Trayvon Martin, filed a lawsuit against Barr for tweeting their home address and phone number in 2012. Zimmerman's parents alleged that Barr sought to "cause a lynch mob to descend" on their home. In August 2015, summary judgment was granted in favor of Barr.

In late March 2018, Barr tweeted about a conspiracy theory involving David Hogg, a survivor of the Marjory Stoneman Douglas High School shooting in Parkland, Florida. The conspiracy theory falsely claimed that Hogg gave a Nazi salute at a March for Our Lives rally on March 24. Barr later deleted her tweet.

=== Valerie Jarrett tweet and Roseanne cancellation ===
Roseanne Barr
(@therealroseanne)
tweeted:

Replying to @MARS0411 @385parkplace @SGTreport

muslim brotherhood & planet of the apes had a baby=vj

29 May 2018

On May 29, 2018, Barr responded to a thread on Twitter about Valerie Jarrett, a senior advisor to former President Obama. The tweet, which read "muslim brotherhood & planet of the apes had a baby=vj" [sic], was widely criticized as being racist about Jarrett ("vj"). Barr was initially defensive, but later posted an apology "for making a bad joke about [Jarrett's] politics and her looks." She disputed allegations of racism, tweeting she believed Jarrett was Saudi, Jewish, and Persian, and released a video where she claims she "thought the bitch was white", and that she was being labelled a racist for having voted for Donald Trump. Barr also said she made the tweet, which she called wrong and indefensible, at 2:00 a.m. while on Ambien, a sedative. Sanofi, which manufactures Ambien, responded by tweeting that "racism is not a known side effect of any Sanofi medication", though noted Ambien had been linked to reduced inhibitions. Later that day, ABC canceled Roseanne and removed the show's content from the network website. Reruns of the original Roseanne were also removed from the Katz Broadcasting-owned diginet Laff. The cancellation announcement from ABC president Channing Dungey, the first African-American woman to head the network, called Barr's remark "abhorrent, repugnant and inconsistent with our values." Within three weeks, the television show was revived as spinoff The Conners, with mostly the same cast and crew, minus Barr. In a later interview with Sean Hannity, Barr said that her tweet was intended to be a political statement rather than a racial one.

Barr's co-star, John Goodman, has consistently said since the Jarrett incident in 2018 that he does not believe Barr is a racist. Also responding to the 2018 incident, former presidential advisor Susan Rice (who is African-American) retweeted something Barr had said about Rice in 2013: "susan rice is a man with big swinging ape balls." [sic].

=== George Soros ===
Barr claimed that George Soros helped Nazis to round up Jews to be sent to concentration camps. In reality, his assimilated father entrusted him to a Hungarian official with whom the 14-year-old Soros went to inventory a Jewish property. Soros said he need not feel guilt, since, if he had not have been there, "somebody else would ... be taking it away anyhow". In response to a tweet about Soros by Chelsea Clinton, Barr tweeted using a clip from 60 Minutes interview of Soros and misquoted him. She later apologized for her comments.

=== Theo Von podcast ===
In 2023, Barr appeared on Theo Von's podcast This Past Weekend, where she and Von discussed then-former President Donald Trump's false claims of election fraud, and she said, "that's all a lie, the election was not rigged [...] thirty-six counties have 81 million people in them. That's the truth and don't you dare say anything against it or you'll be off YouTube, Facebook, Twitter and all the other ones." She then appeared to deny the Holocaust, declaring, "six million Jews should die right now, because they cause all the problems in the world", in what she said was sarcasm. Within the same podcast, she discussed her Jewish faith, and in response to Von's comment that "Hollywood is a Jewish business", she replied, "people should be glad that it's Jewish, too, because if Jews were not controlling Hollywood all you'd have was fucking fishing shows".

The segment in which she talked about the Holocaust was subsequently spread on Twitter, misleadingly edited to remove the context which made it clear that her remarks were sarcastic, sparking controversy. Twitter subsequently added a "context" message to the tweet containing the edited video, which stated it was an edited clip, that Roseanne is Jewish, and that she wasn't making defamatory comments on Jews or the Holocaust. In response to the controversy, she stated that she had lost family members in the Holocaust, clarifying, "I was raised in an apartment building with Holocaust survivors, so of course I don't believe the Holocaust never happened and I actually am [a religious Jew]". Jonathan Greenblatt, Director and CEO of the Anti-Defamation League (ADL), tweeted in response to the clip, "sarcasm or not, Roseanne Barr's comments about Jews and the Holocaust are reprehensible and irresponsible. This isn't funny." The Simon Wiesenthal Center reviewed the interview and concluded that she had been taken out of context. The podcast episode was subsequently removed from YouTube for violating the site's hate speech policies.

== Political activities ==
=== 2012 presidential campaign ===
On August 5, 2011, Barr appeared on The Tonight Show with Jay Leno and announced her candidacy for president in the 2012 presidential election, running on the self-created "Green Tea Party" ticket. Her candidacy called attention to economics, personal health, and meditation.

She also stated she would run for Prime Minister of Israel. In an interview with The Jewish Daily Forward, she invoked tikkun olam in her support of bringing women into politics and religion.

On September 19, she appeared at the Occupy Wall Street protests and spoke in support of the protestors. "She stated any 'guilty' Wall Street bankers should be forced to give up any income over $100 million, and if they are unable to live on that, be sent to re-education camps, and if that doesn't help be beheaded".

Barr filed with the Federal Election Commission as a Green Party presidential candidate in January 2012. She formally announced her candidacy for the party's presidential nomination on February 2. On July 14, she came in second in the 2012 Green Party presidential primaries and subsequent convention roll call, losing the nomination to Jill Stein. Stein chose Cheri Honkala as her running-mate after campaign manager Ben Manski said Barr was shortlisted for the job.

Barr was given a prime speaking role at the Green Party National Convention in Baltimore, Maryland, but decided to instead send a surrogate (Farheen Hakeem) to speak on her behalf. Barr's surrogate reportedly chided the party for not respecting Barr's candidacy. A shouting match in a hallway reportedly ensued.

Barr repeatedly criticized Jill Stein after losing the Green Party nomination, and used alleged transphobic words in statements about Stein on Twitter.

Shortly after losing the Green Party nomination, on August 4, 2012, Barr won the presidential nomination of the Peace and Freedom Party with activist Cindy Sheehan as her running mate. The Peace and Freedom Party held its nominating convention August 4–5 at Vermont Square United Methodist Church in Los Angeles.

Sheehan immediately had disagreements with Barr's views on policy, desire to campaign only online, and treatment of Green Party nominee Jill Stein, leading Sheehan to request that her name be taken off the Peace and Freedom Party ticket. Sheehan was told it was too late to have her name removed, so she instead announced that she would be leaving the campaign.

Barr appeared on the ballot in California, Colorado, and Florida. She did not appear on the ballot in her home state of Hawaii (which did not allow write-in votes). She ended up voting for President Obama. She received 67,326 votes nationwide, placing sixth overall with 0.05% of the popular vote; Stein, who appeared on the ballot of thirty-six states and the District of Columbia, placed far ahead of her in fourth place with 0.36% of the popular vote and 469,627 votes.

Barr was followed by a film crew throughout her entire campaign, with documentarian Eric Weinrib directing, leading to questions about the sincerity of her campaign. Over 300 hours were filmed and were released as a film called Roseanne for President! Despite questions of her sincerity regarding her campaign, Barr and her family have insisted her desire to run for president was "very real."

==== Endorsements ====
- Green Party Black Caucus
- National Organization for the Reform of Marijuana Laws
- Cynthia McKinney, 2008 Green Party nominee

=== Support for Donald Trump ===
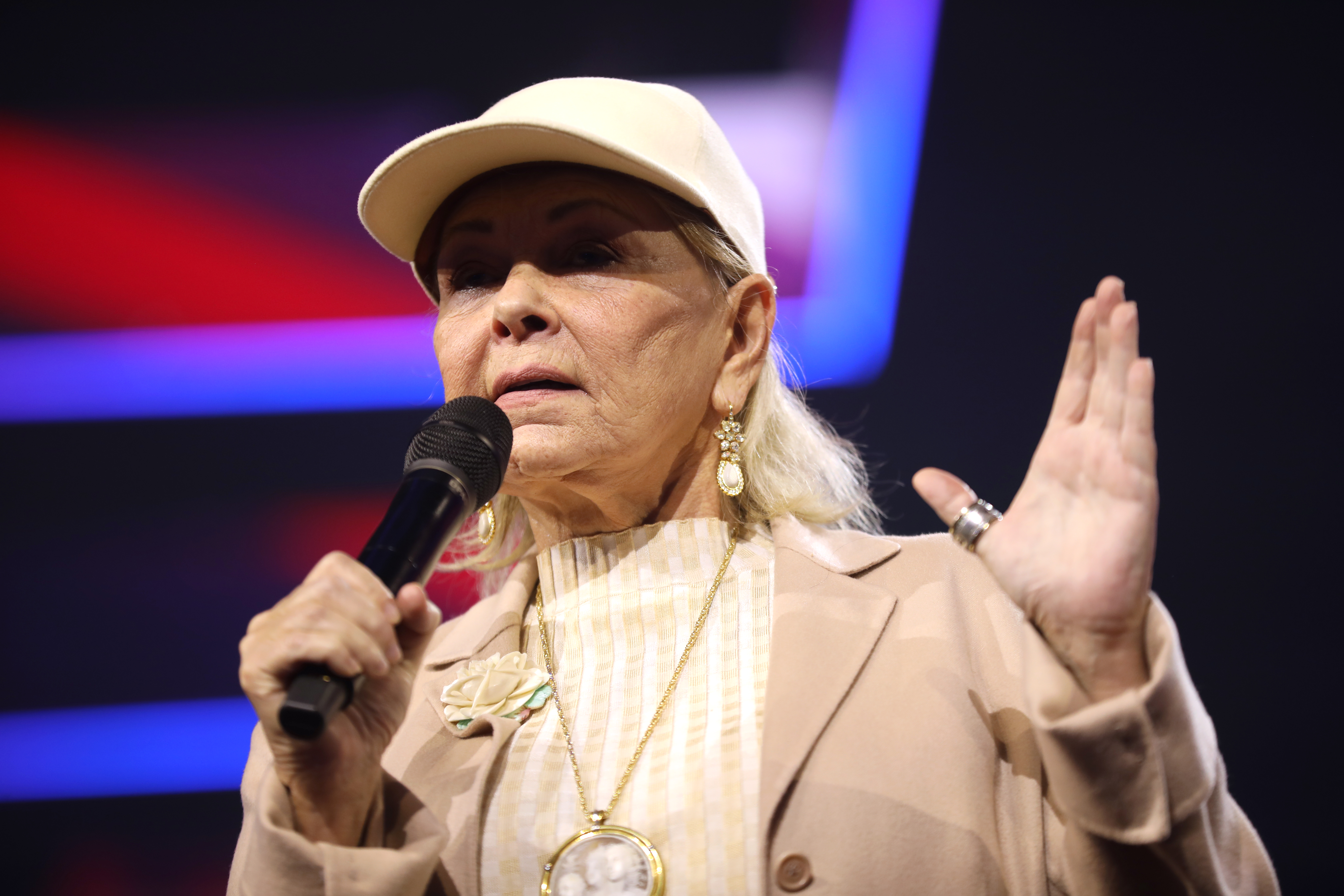
Barr speaking with attendees at the 2023 AmericaFest in Phoenix

Barr voiced her support for Republican presidential candidate Donald Trump in a June 2016 Hollywood Reporter interview. "I think we would be so lucky if Trump won. Because then it wouldn't be Hillary."

A July 2016 CNN story reported she did not endorse Trump as she only supports herself for president—"I will be writing myself in in every election from now until I win."

In March 2018, Barr retweeted a false claim by QAnon conspiracy theorist Liz Crokin that Trump had saved hundreds of children from sex traffickers during his first month in office, as well as similar misinformation about child trafficking. Barr later deleted her tweets. In May 2018, Barr defended her support for Trump on The Tonight Show Starring Jimmy Fallon.

In December 2023, Barr spoke at the Turning Point USA-hosted AmericaFest.

Barr is featured in rapper Tom MacDonald's single "Daddy's Home", released on January 17, 2025; the song's title references the second inauguration of Donald Trump. Barr's solo verse in the song includes the lyrics "Screw Eminem" and "Why they trying to turn Becky into Dan?", the latter referencing the characters in her shows.

== Discography ==
=== Album ===
- 1990: I Enjoy Being a Girl (Hollywood Records) CD/Cassette

=== Audiobook ===
- 2011: Roseannearchy: Dispatches from the Nut Farm (Unabridged) CD/Download

== Filmography ==
=== Film ===
Year	Title	Role	Notes
1989	She-Devil	Ruth Patchett	
1990	Look Who's Talking Too	Julie (voice)	Nominated - Golden Raspberry Award for Worst Supporting Actress
1991	Freddy's Dead: The Final Nightmare	Childless woman	
1993	Even Cowgirls Get the Blues	Madame Zoe	
1995	Blue in the Face	Dot	
1997	Meet Wally Sparks	Cameo as herself	
2000	Cecil B. Demented	Cameo as herself	
2001	Joe Dirt	Joe Dirt's mother	Scenes deleted, replaced by Caroline Aaron in the final film
2004	Home on the Range	Maggie (voice)	
2014	Master of the Good Name	Grandma Ruth	Co-starring Mayim Bialik
2016	Roseanne for President!	Herself	Documentary about her 2012 presidential campaign
2023	Cancel This!	Herself	Comedy special

=== Television ===
Year	Title	Role	Notes
1986	Rodney Dangerfield: It's Not Easy Bein' Me	Herself	HBO special
1988–1997, 2018	Roseanne	Roseanne Harris-Conner	Producer (1990–1991); Co-executive producer (1991–1992); Executive producer (1992–1997); Directed two episodes in 1995 and 1996
1990	Little Rosey	Executive producer	13 episodes
1991	Backfield in Motion	Nancy Seavers	TV movie (also executive producer)
1992	A Different World	Looting Wife (uncredited)	1 episode
1992	The Rosey and Buddy Show	Rosey (voice)	TV movie (also creator, writer, and executive producer)
1992	The Jackie Thomas Show	Regina	2 episodes (executive producer)
1993	The Woman Who Loved Elvis	Joyce Jackson	TV movie (also executive producer)
1993–1995	The Larry Sanders Show	Roseanne	3 episodes
1994	General Hospital	Jennifer Smith	1 episode
1995	Women of the House	Roseanne	1 episode
1997	3rd Rock from the Sun	Janet	2 episodes
1997	The Nanny	Cousin Sheila	1 episode
2006	My Name Is Earl	Millie Banks	1 episode
2012	Downwardly Mobile	Rose Davis	Unsold pilot co-starring John Goodman (also creator and executive producer)
2013	Portlandia	Interim Mayor/The New Mayor	2 episodes
2013	The Office	Carla Fern	2 episodes
2013–2014	Teenage Mutant Ninja Turtles	Kraang Prime	6 episodes
2014	The Millers	Darla	1 episode
2015	Cristela	Veronica	2 episodes
2024	Mr. Birchum	Principal Pam Bortles (voice)	Animated series

=== Host ===
Year	Title	Role	Notes
1991	Roseanne Barr Live from Trump Castle	Herself (also writer, director, and executive producer)	HBO comedy special
1994	MTV Video Music Awards	Host	First female host
1996	Saturday Night Special	Host	6 episodes
1998–2000	The Roseanne Show	Host (also executive producer)	
2003	The Real Roseanne Show	Host (also executive producer)	2 episodes (+11 unaired)
2006	Roseanne Barr: Blonde and Bitchin'	Herself (also writer and executive producer)	HBO comedy special
2009	The Tipping Point	Host (also creator and executive producer)	Unsold political talk show pilot
2011	Roseanne's Nuts	Herself (also executive producer)	
2012	Comedy Central Roast of Roseanne	Roastee	
2014–2015	Last Comic Standing	Judge	19 episodes
2014–2015	Momsters: When Moms Go Bad	Host	7 episodes
2023–present	The Roseanne Barr Podcast	Host	TBD

== Awards ==
Barr has a star on the Hollywood Walk of Fame on the north side of the 6700 block of Hollywood Boulevard.

== Bibliography ==
- Roseanne: My Life as a Woman. Harper & Row. October 1989. ISBN 0-06-015957-X.
- My Lives. Ballantine Books. February 9, 1994. ISBN 0-345-37815-6.
- Roseannearchy: Dispatches from the Nut Farm. Gallery Books. January 4, 2011. ISBN 978-1-4391-5482-3.

Party political offices
Preceded by Ralph Nader	Peace and Freedom nominee for President of the United States; 2012	Succeeded by Gloria La Riva
