= 2012 Green Party presidential primaries =

- February 24 – June 5, 2012

294 delegates to the Green National Convention 148 delegates votes needed to win
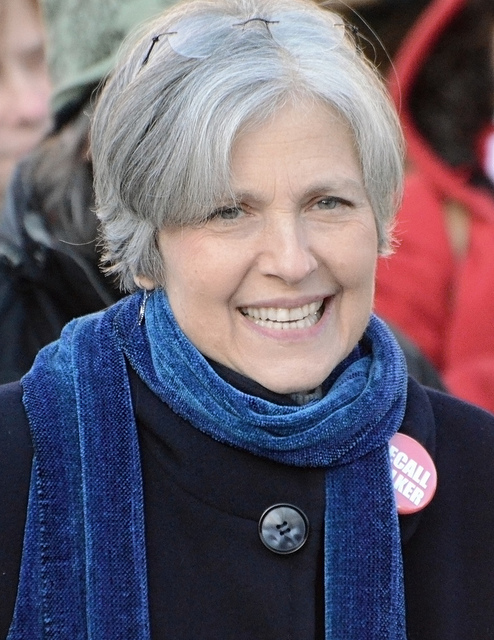

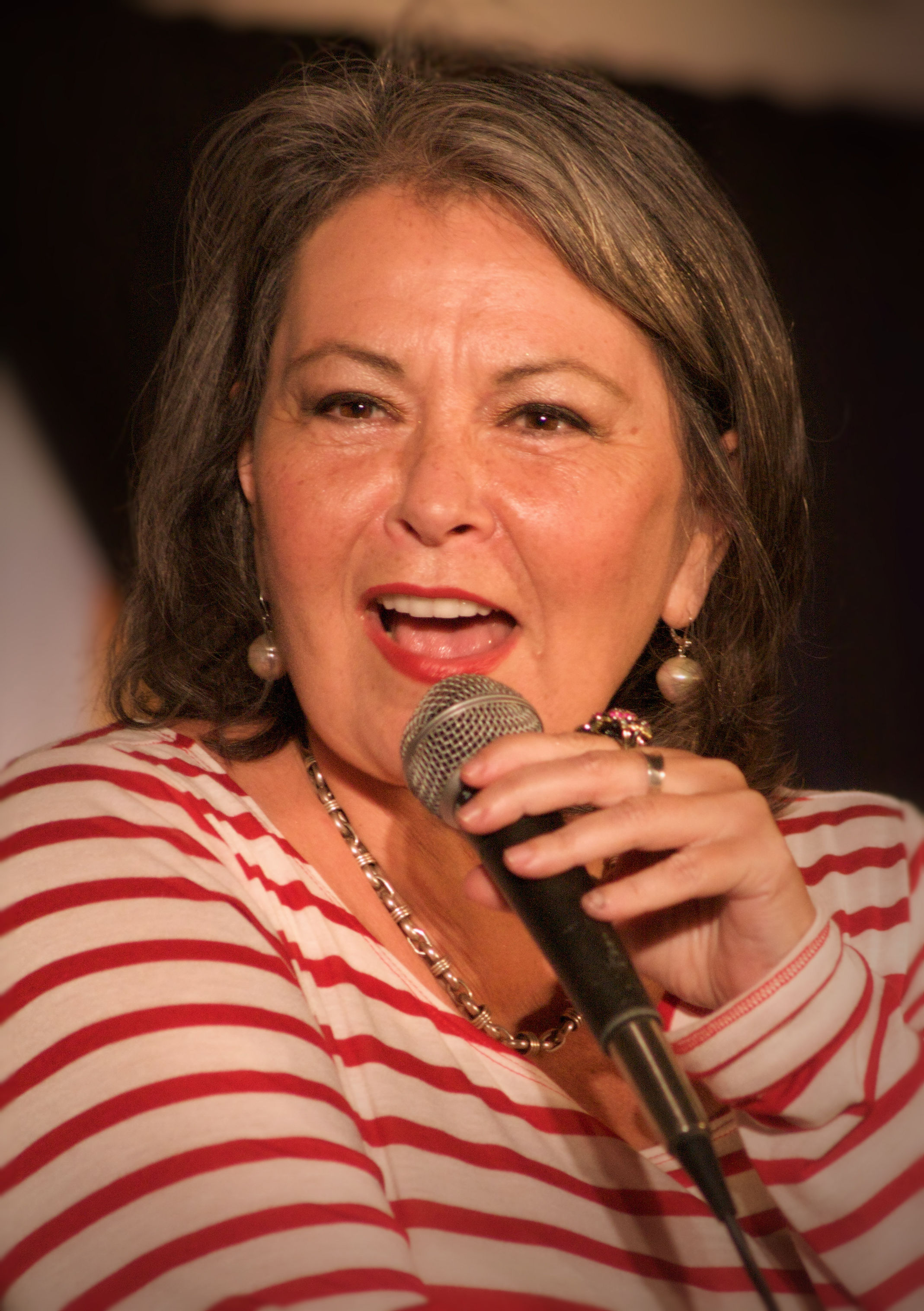

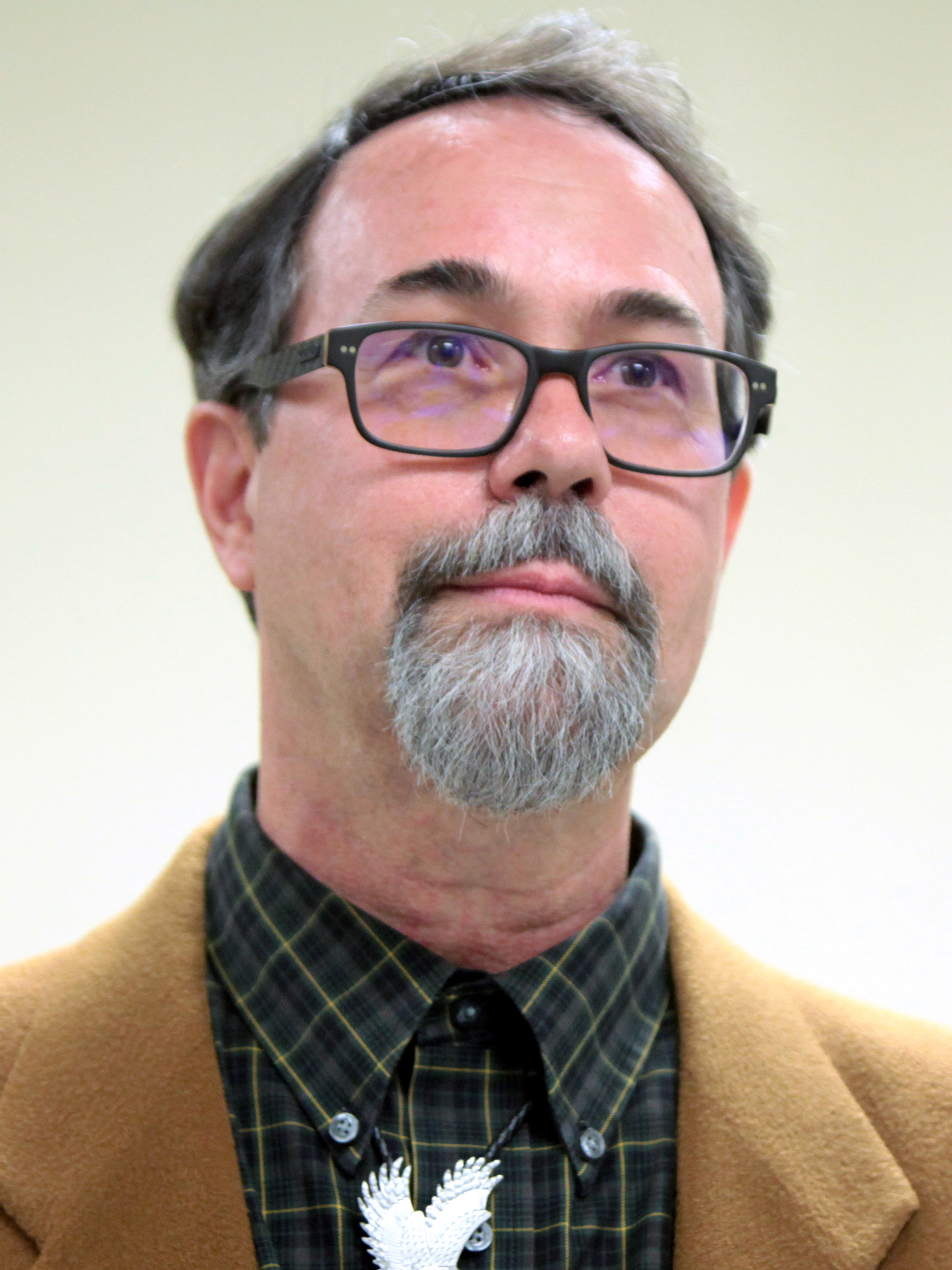
Candidate	Jill Stein	Roseanne Barr	Kent Mesplay
Home state	Massachusetts	Hawaii	California
Delegate count	194	67	15.5
Contests won	24	2	0
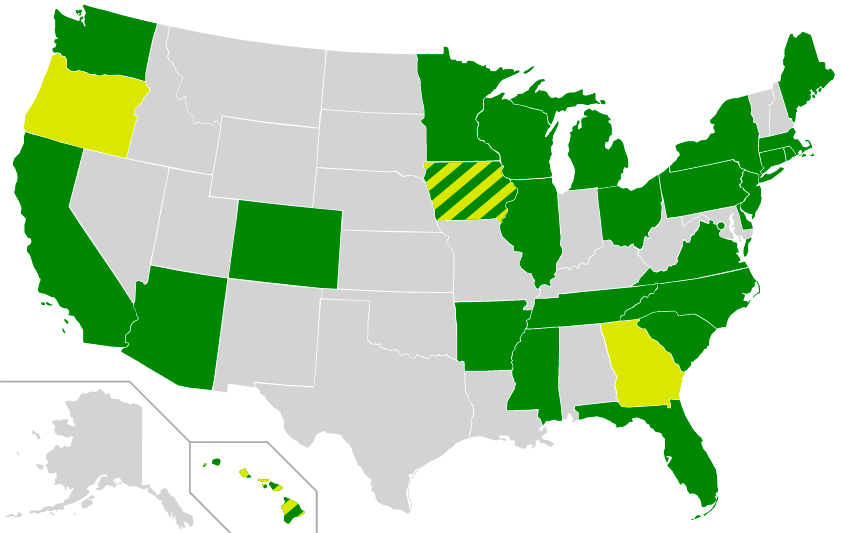
First place (popular vote or delegate count)
Jill Stein	Roseanne Barr Kent Mesplay
Previous Green nominee
Cynthia McKinney
Green nominee
Jill Stein

The Green Party of the United States held primaries in several states in 2012. Jill Stein won most of the primaries and was formally nominated as the party's nominee during the 2012 Green National Convention.

== Candidates ==
Candidate	Most recent position	Campaign	Delegates	Delegations with plurality
Jill Stein	Lexington Town Meeting member (2005–2011)	(Campaign • Website)	194 / 289 (67.13%)	24; AR, AZ, CA, CO, CT, DE, FL, IL, MA, MI, MS, ME, MN, NJ, NY, OH, PA, RI, SC, TN, VA, WA, DC, WI
Roseanne Barr	Comedian, Host of The Roseanne Show	(Website)	67 / 289 (23.18%)	2 GA, OR
Kent Mesplay	Inspector at the Air Pollution Control; District of San Diego County (2001–2015)	(Website)	15.5 / 289 (5.36%)	None
Harley Mikkelson	Candidate for the Green Party of Michigan	(Website)	3.5 / 289 (3.48%)	None
Alternate ballot options
No preference/ Other/ Uncommitted	N/A		28 / 289 (9.69%)	None

== Schedule ==
		Winning			Projected delegates					
Date	State	Candidate	Vote	Percent	Stein	Barr	Mesplay	Mikkelson	Other	Total
February 5	Ohio	Jill Stein	-	90%	9	0	0	0	0	9
February 24	Illinois	Jill Stein	109	71%	22	5	2	0	2	31
February 29	Arizona	Jill Stein	350	69%	5	0	0	0	0	5
March 3	Wisconsin	Jill Stein	55	73%	7	1	1	0	0	9
March 6	Massachusetts	Jill Stein	1,018	67%	7	0	1	1	2	11
March 11	Virginia	Jill Stein	-	69%	3.5	0.5	0.5	0.5	0	5
March 18	New Jersey	Jill Stein	-	-	4	1	0	0	0	5
April 1	Colorado	Jill Stein	-	-	5	1	1	0	0	7
April 3	D.C.	Jill Stein	199	67%	4	0	0	0	0	4
April 28	Connecticut	Jill Stein	-	80%	8	0	0	0	2	10
April 28	South Carolina	Jill Stein	-	-	6	2	0	0	0	8
May 5	Maine	Jill Stein	-	-	7	6	0	0	0	13
May 6	Rhode Island	Jill Stein	-	-	2	1	0	0	1	4
May 6	Arkansas	Jill Stein	-	100%	10	0	0	0	0	10
May 12	Delaware	Jill Stein	-	-	4	0	0	0	0	4
May 19	Hawaii	Tie	-	-	2	2	0	0	0	4
May 19	Minnesota	Jill Stein	-	-	4	3	0	0	0	7
May 19	Mississippi	Jill Stein	-	-	4	0	0	0	0	4
May 19	New York	Jill Stein	-	88%	14	2	0	0	0	16
May 19	Pennsylvania	Jill Stein	-	-	4	3	0	0	0	7
May 19	Tennessee	Jill Stein	-	-	2.5	1.5	0	0	0	4
May 27	Florida	Jill Stein	-	-	5	2	1	0	0	8
May 27	Iowa	Tie	-	-	2	2	0	0	0	4
May 27	Washington	Jill Stein	-	-	4	0	0	0	0	4
June 2	Georgia	Roseanne Barr	-	-	3	1	0	0	0	4
June 2	Oregon	Roseanne Barr	9	56%	5	4	0	0	0	4
June 3	Michigan	Jill Stein	-	56%	9	3	2	2	0	16
June 5	California	Jill Stein	8,826	49.3%	32	26	7	0	0	65
-	Delegates not awarded by contests	-	-	-	-	-	-	-	12	12
Total	United States				194	67	15.5	3½	19	294

†Gray indicates that the primary, caucus, or convention has occurred but the official results have not yet been released.

== Results ==
=== Results by state ===

Jill Stein
Roseanne Barr
Kent Mesplay
No contest

=== Ohio Convention (February 5) ===
The Ohio Green Party Convention took place on February 5.

Ohio Green Party Convention, February 5, 2012
Candidate	Votes	Percentage	National delegates
Jill Stein	-	90%	9
All Others	-	10%	0
Total	-	100%	9

=== Illinois primary (February 24) ===
The Illinois Green Party Convention took place on February 24.

Illinois Green Party Primary, February 24, 2012
Candidate	Votes	Percentage	National delegates
Jill Stein	109	71%	22
Roseanne Barr (write-in)	27	18%	5
Kent Mesplay	8	5%	2
Uncommitted	8	5%	2
Others	1	1%	0
Total	153	100%	31

=== Arizona primary (February 29) ===
The Arizona Green Party held its primary on February 29.

Arizona Green Party presidential primary, February 29, 2012
Candidate	Votes	Percentage	National delegates
Jill Stein	385	68.6%	5
Kent Mesplay	50	8.9%	0
Michael Oatman	39	6.9%	0
Richard Grayson	39	6.9%	0
Gary Swing	30	5.3%	0
Gerard Davis	18	3.2%	0
Total	561	100%	5

=== Wisconsin primary (March 3) ===
The Wisconsin primary took place on March 3.

Wisconsin Green Party presidential primary, March 3, 2012
Candidate	Votes	Percentage	National delegates
Jill Stein	55	73%	7
Roseanne Barr	11	15%	1
Kent Mesplay	5	7%	1
Harley Mikkelson	1	1%	0
Uncommitted	3	4%	0
Total	75	100%	9

=== Massachusetts primary (March 6) ===
The Massachusetts primary took place on March 6. Three candidates appeared on the ballot.

County results of the Massachusetts Green presidential primaries, 2012. Jill Stein

Massachusetts Green Party presidential primary, March 6, 2012
Candidate	Votes	Percentage	National delegates
Jill Stein	1,018	67.1%	7
Kent Mesplay	89	5.9%	1
Harley Mikkelson	84	5.5%	1
Others	95	6.3%	0
No preference	232	15.3%	2
Blank votes (not tallied)	36	n/a	n/a
Total	1,554	100%	10

=== Virginia primary (March 11) ===
The Virginia Green Party held its primary on March 11.

Virginia Green Party presidential primary, March 11, 2016
Candidate	Votes	Percentage	National delegates
Jill Stein	-	69.4%	3.5
Roseanne Barr	-	12.3%	0.5
Kent Mesplay	-	5.2%	0.5
Harley Mikkelson	-	4.5%	0.5
None of the above	-	4.4%	0
Other	-	4.2%	0
Total	-	100%	5

=== New Jersey convention (March 18) ===
The New Jersey Green Party Convention took place on March 18.

New Jersey Green Party Convention, March 18, 2012
Candidate	Votes	Percentage	National delegates
Jill Stein	-	78%	4
Roseanne Barr	-	22%	1
Total	-	100%	5

=== Colorado convention (March 31) ===
The Colorado Green Party Convention took place on March 31.

Colorado Green Party Convention, April 1, 2012
Candidate	Votes	Percentage	National delegates
Jill Stein	-	70%	5
Roseanne Barr	-	-	1
Kent Mesplay	-	-	1
Total	-	100%	7

=== DC Primary (April 3) ===
The DC Statehood Party Primary took place on April 3.

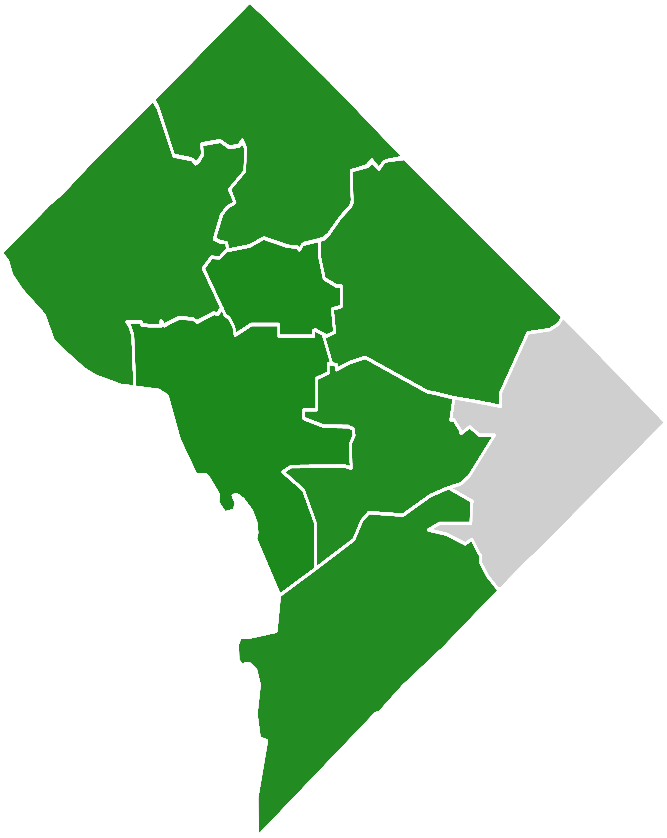
District of Columbia Green presidential primary election results by ward, 2012. Jill Stein Write-In

DC Statehood Party Primary, April 3, 2012
Candidate	Votes	Percentage	National delegates
Jill Stein	216	62.97%	3
Write-in	100	29.15%	1
No Candidate	27	7.87%	0
Total	343	100%	4

=== Connecticut convention (April 28) ===
The Connecticut Green Party Convention took place on April 28.

Connecticut Green Party Convention, April 28, 2012
Candidate	Votes	Percentage	National delegates
Jill Stein	-	80%	8
Uncommitted	-	20%	2
Total	-	-	10

=== South Carolina convention (April 28) ===
The South Carolina Green Party Convention took place on April 28.

South Carolina Green Party Convention, April 28, 2012
Candidate	Votes	Percentage	National delegates
Jill Stein	-	85%	7
Roseanne Barr	-	15%	1
Total	-	100%	8

=== Maine Caucuses (May 5) ===
The Maine Green Party held caucuses, and the state meeting took place on May 5.

Maine Green Party caucuses, May 5, 2012
Candidate	Votes	Percentage	National delegates
Jill Stein	-	-	7
Roseanne Barr	-	-	6
Total	-	-	13

=== Rhode Island convention (May 6) ===
The Rhode Island Green Party Convention took place on May 6.

Rhode Island Green Party Convention, May 6, 2012
Candidate	Votes	Percentage	National delegates
Jill Stein	-	-	2
Roseanne Barr	-	-	1
Uncommitted	-	-	1
Total	-	-	4

=== Arkansas convention (May 6) ===
The Arkansas Green Party Convention took place on May 6.

Arkansas Green Party Convention, May 6, 2012
Candidate	Votes	Percentage	National delegates
Jill Stein	-	100%	10
Total	-	100%	10

=== Delaware convention (May 12) ===
The Delaware Green Party Convention took place on May 12 in Newark, Delaware.

Delaware Green Party Convention, May 12, 2012
Candidate	Votes	Percentage	National delegates
Jill Stein	-	-	4
Roseanne Barr	-	-	0
Kent Mesplay	-	-	0
Total	-	-	4

=== Hawaii convention (May 19) ===
The Hawaii Green Party Convention took place on May 19.

Hawaii Green Party Convention, May 19, 2012
Candidate	Votes	Percentage	National delegates
Jill Stein	-	-	2
Roseanne Barr	-	-	2
Total	-	-	4

=== Minnesota Caucuses (May 19) ===
The Minnesota Green Party Caucuses took place on May 19.

Minnesota Green Party Caucuses, May 19, 2012
Candidate	Votes	Percentage	National delegates
Jill Stein	-	-	4
Roseanne Barr	-	-	3
Total	-	-	7

=== Mississippi convention (May 19) ===
The Mississippi Green Party Convention took place on May 19.

Mississippi Green Party Convention, May 19, 2012
Candidate	Votes	Percentage	National delegates
Jill Stein	-	-	4
Total	-	-	4

=== New York convention (May 19) ===
The New York Green Party Convention took place on May 19.

New York Green Party Convention, May 19, 2012
Candidate	Votes	Percentage	National delegates
Jill Stein	-	88%	14
Roseanne Barr	-	12%	2
Kent Mesplay	-	0%	0
Total	-	100%	16

=== Pennsylvania convention (May 19) ===
The Pennsylvania Green Party convention took place on May 19.

Pennsylvania Green Party convention, May 19, 2012
Candidate	Votes	Percentage	National delegates
Jill Stein	-	-	4
Roseanne Barr	-	-	3
Total	-	-	7

=== Tennessee convention (May 19) ===
The Tennessee Green Party convention took place on May 19.

Tennessee Green Party convention, May 19, 2012
Candidate	Votes	Percentage	National delegates
Jill Stein	-	-	2.5
Roseanne Barr	-	-	1.5
Total	-	-	4

=== Florida primary (May 27) ===
The Florida Green Party primary took place on May 27.

Florida Green Party primary, May 27, 2012
Candidate	Votes	Percentage	National delegates
Jill Stein	-	-	5
Roseanne Barr	-	-	2
Kent Mesplay	-	-	1
Total	-	-	8

=== Iowa primary (May 27) ===
The Iowa Green Party primary took place on May 27.

Iowa Green Party primary, May 27, 2012
Candidate	Votes	Percentage	National delegates
Jill Stein	-	-	2
Roseanne Barr	-	-	2
Total	-	-	4

=== Washington Convention (May 27) ===
The Washington Green Party Convention took place on May 27.

Washington Green Party Convention, May 27, 2012
Candidate	Votes	Percentage	National delegates
Jill Stein	-	-	4
Total	-	-	4

=== Georgia convention (June 2) ===
The Georgia Green Party convention took place on June 2.

Georgia Green Party convention, June 2, 2012
Candidate	Votes	Percentage	National delegates
Roseanne Barr	-	-	3
Jill Stein	-	-	1
Total	-	-	4

=== Oregon convention (June 2) ===
The Pacific Green Party convention took place on June 2. The members voted using a ranked choice system, but only two candidates received votes so it stayed in one round.

Pacific Green Party convention, June 2, 2012
Candidate	Votes	Percentage	National delegates
Roseanne Barr	9	56%	5
Jill Stein	7	43%	4
Total	16	100%	9

=== Michigan convention (June 3) ===
The Michigan Green Party convention took place on June 3.

Michigan Green Party convention, June 3, 2012
Candidate	Votes	Percentage	National delegates
Jill Stein	-	56%	9
Roseanne Barr	-	17%	3
Kent Mesplay	-	11%	2
Harley Mkkelson	-	13%	2
Other	-	3%	0
Total	-	100%	16

=== California primary (June 5) ===
The California Primary took place on June 5. Three candidates appeared on the ballot.

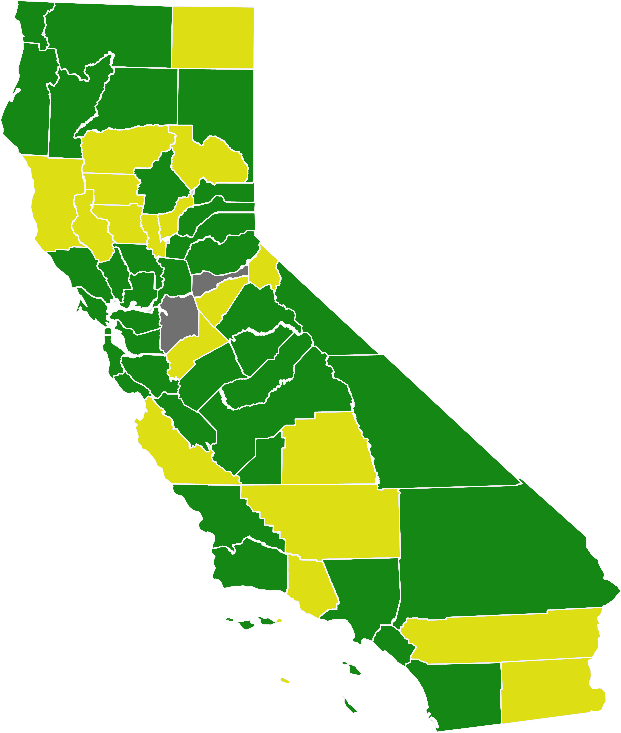
County results of the California Green presidential primaries, 2016. Jill Stein Roseanne Barr Tie

California Green Party presidential primary, June 5, 2012
Candidate	Votes	Percentage	National delegates
Jill Stein	9,165	49.4%	32
Roseanne Barr	7,339	39.8%	26
Kent Mesplay	2,005	10.8%	7
Total	18,569	100%	65
