= 2012 Green National Convention =

U.S. political event held in Baltimore, Maryland

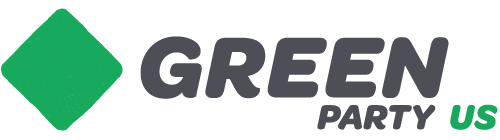
- 2012 presidential election

- Nominees; Stein and Honkala

Convention
- Dates: July 12–15, 2012
- City: Baltimore, Maryland
- Venue: University of Baltimore (July 12–13); Holiday Inn Inner Harbor (July 14–15)

Candidates
- Presidential nominee: Jill Stein of Massachusetts
- Vice-presidential nominee: Cheri Honkala of Pennsylvania

Sites of the 2012 national party conventions.

The 2012 Green National Convention took place on July 12–15, 2012, in Baltimore, Maryland. The Annual National Meeting of the Green Party of the United States was held at the University of Baltimore (William H. Thumel Sr. Business Center), and the National Convention on July 14 was held at the Holiday Inn Inner Harbor (Chesapeake Room).

The convention was preceded by the 2012 Green Party presidential primaries.

== Nomination ==
Jill Stein of Massachusetts won the presidential nomination with 193.5 out of 294 delegates' votes. Television personality Roseanne Barr received 72 votes, and 17 votes were cast for activist Kent Mesplay.

=== Candidates ===
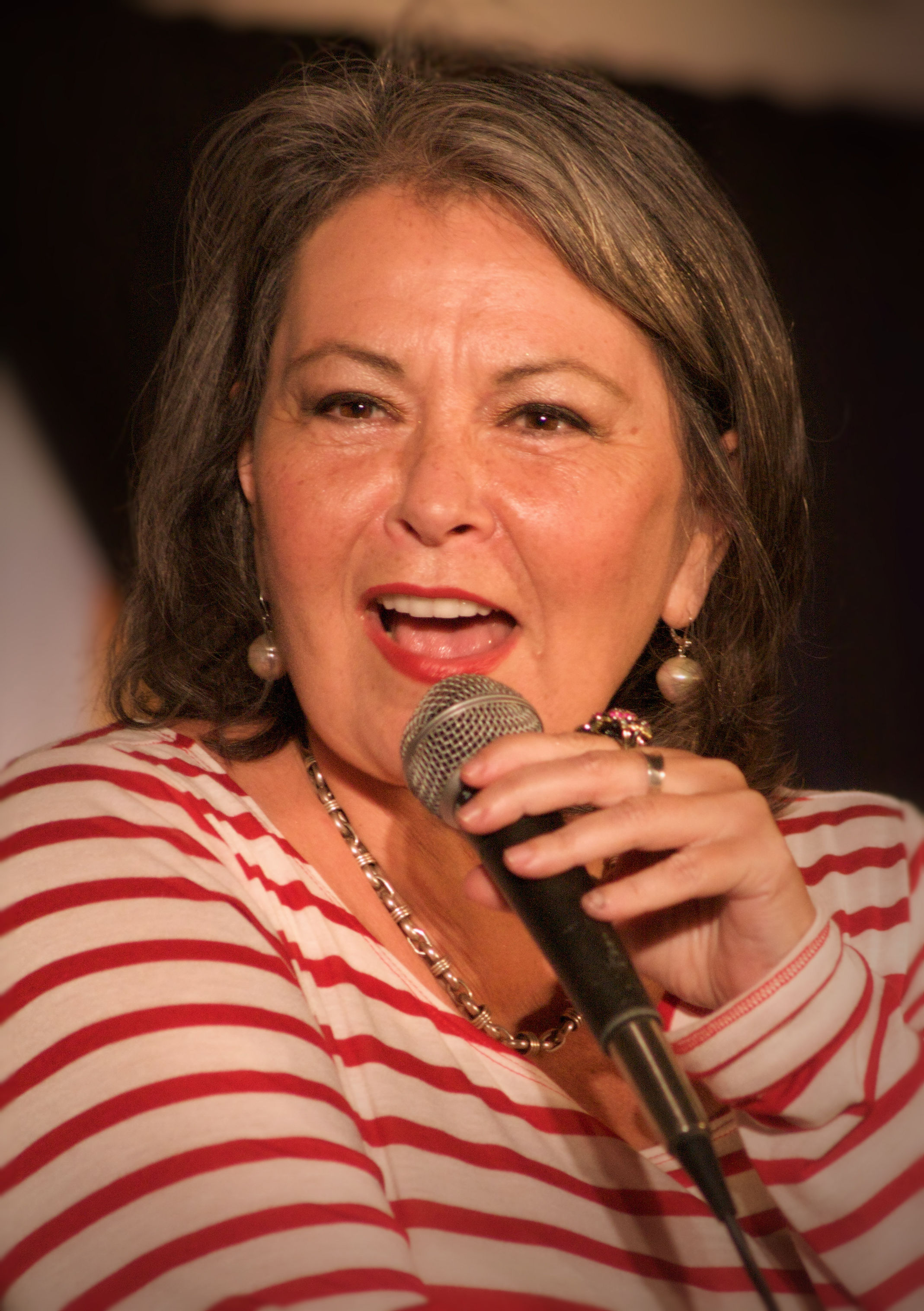
Roseanne Barr of Hawaii, Comedian, actor, and activist.

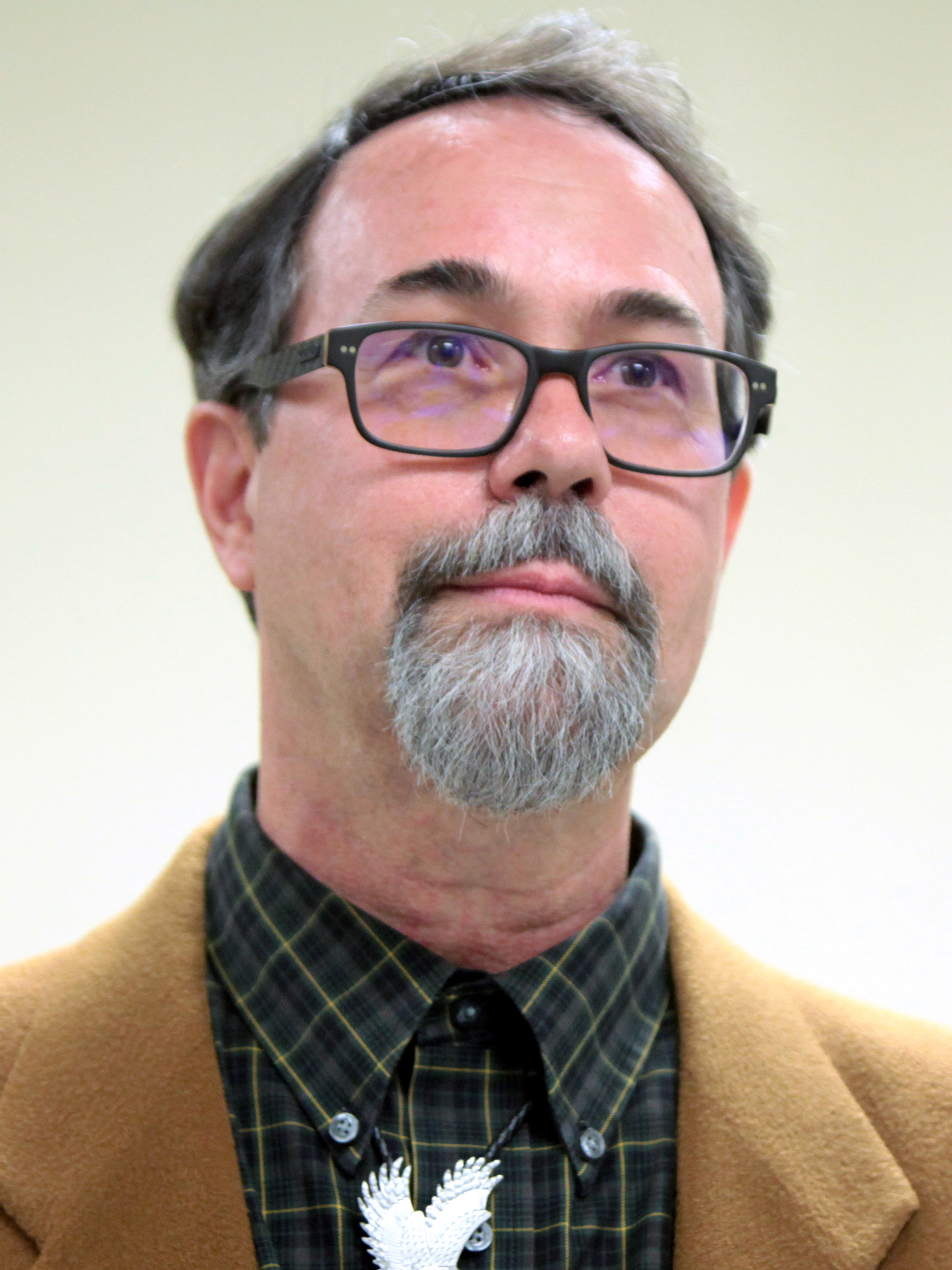
Kent Mesplay of California, San Diego County air pollution enforcement officer.

Harley Mikkelson of Michigan, 2010 Green Party of Michigan candidate for Governor.

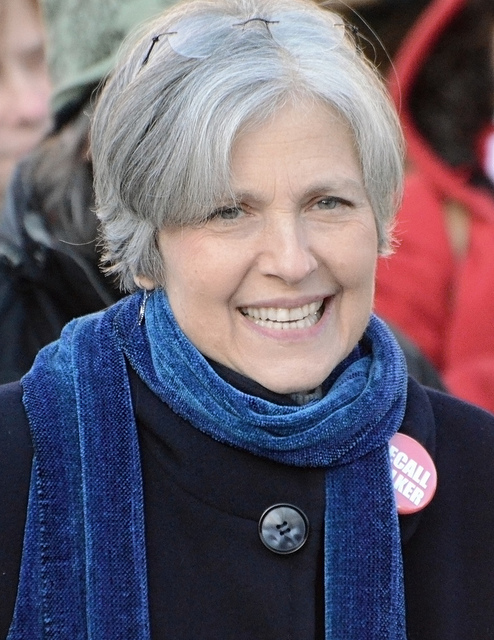
Jill Stein of Massachusetts, Physician, 2010 Green-Rainbow Party candidate for Governor.

=== Results ===
Vote by State Delegation: Jill Stein Kent Mesplay / Roseanne Barr Stein/Barr tied

Green Party National Convention presidential vote, 2012
Candidate	Votes	Percentage
Jill Stein	193½	67.0%
Roseanne Barr	72	24.9%
Kent Mesplay	17	5.9%
Harley Mikkelson	3½	1.2%
Other	3	1.0%
Totals	289	100.0%

Cheri Honkala, an anti-poverty activist from Pennsylvania, won the vice-presidential nomination.

== See also ==
- Jill Stein 2012 presidential campaign
- Other Green National Convention
  - 2000
  - 2004
  - 2008
  - 2016
- Other parties' presidential nominating convention of 2012:
  - Democratic
  - Libertarian
  - Republican
