= List of fashion education programs =

This is a list of fashion education programs at colleges and universities around the world.

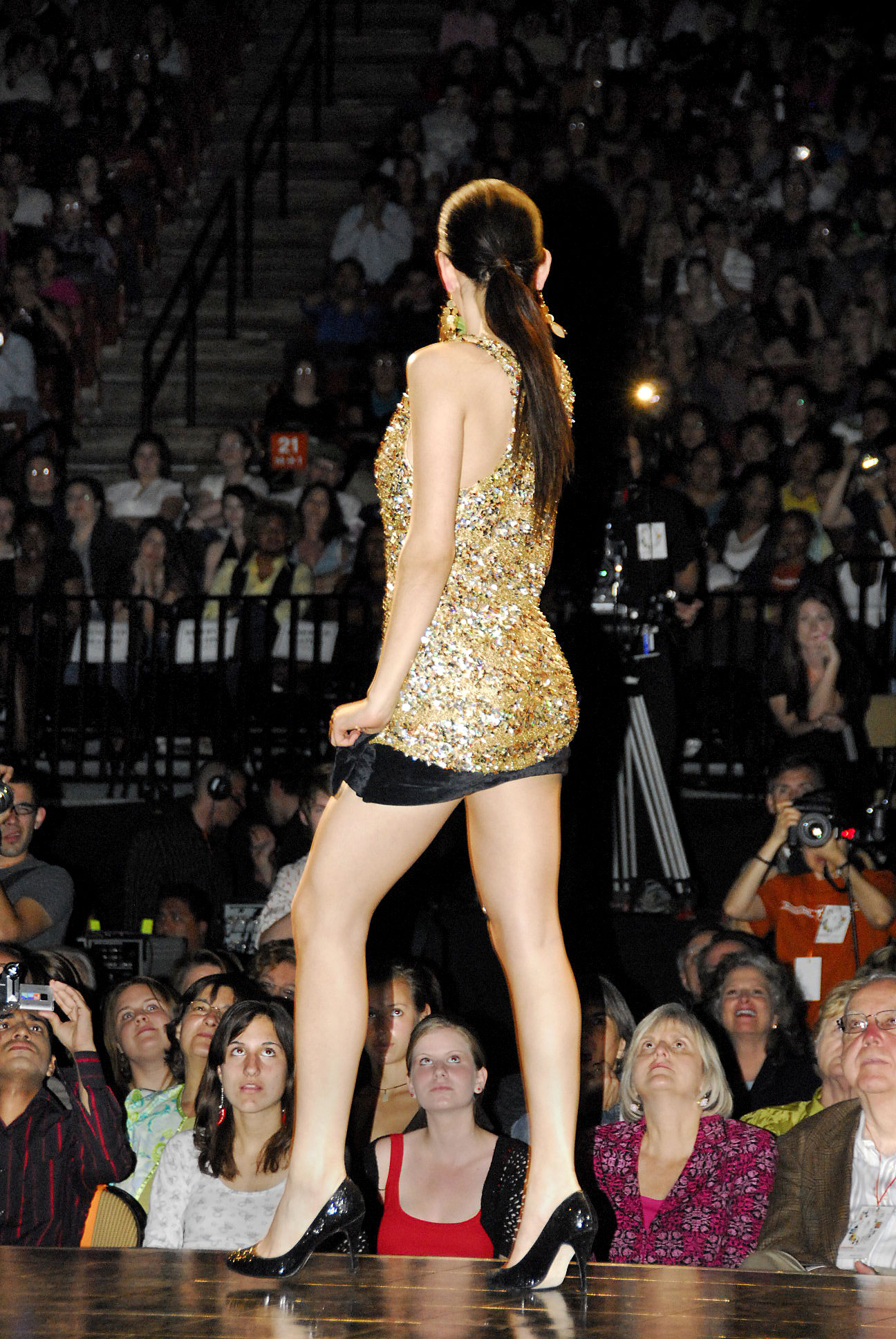
A fashion show organized by students of University of Texas at Austin, USA, 2007

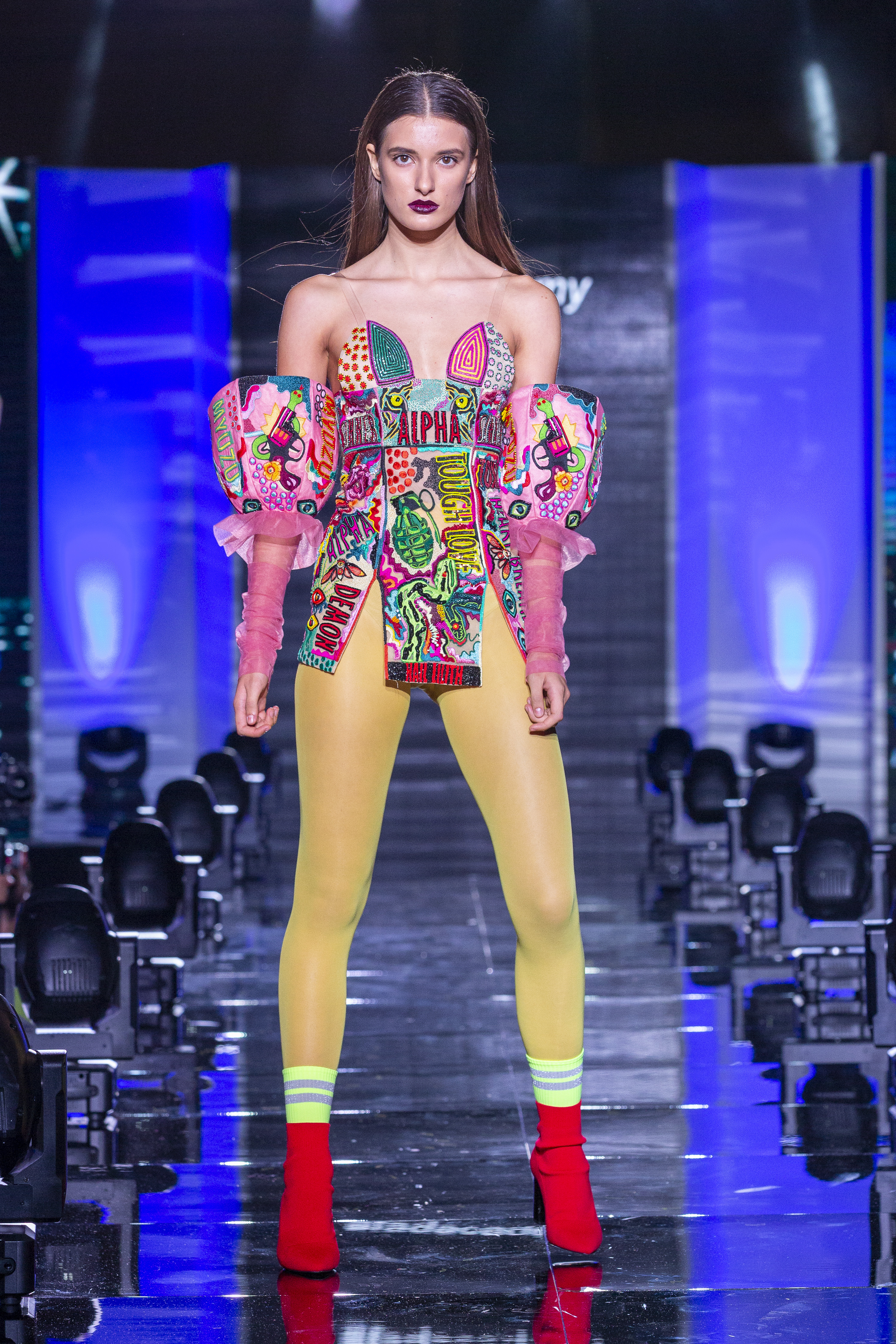
A fashion show organized by students of FAD Institute of Luxury Fashion & Style at Piazza Di Spagna, Rome, 2019

There are a number of specialized art schools and design schools worldwide that offer degrees in fashion design and fashion design technology; some colleges also offer Masters of Fashion courses. See Bachelor of Design and Master of Design. Design schools include:

- Argentina
  - University of Palermo, Buenos Aires
- Australia
  - RMIT University, Melbourne
  - University of Technology Sydney, Sydney
  - Queensland University of Technology, Brisbane
  - Sydney Institute of TAFE
  - Whitehouse Institute of Design, Melbourne and Sydney
- Bangladesh
  - Bangladesh University of Textiles (BUTEX), Dhaka
  - Shanto-Mariam University of Creative Technology, Dhaka
  - BGMEA Institute of Fashion & Technology (BUFT), Dhaka
- Belgium
  - La Cambre
  - Royal Academy of Fine Arts (Antwerp)
- Canada
  - George Brown College
  - Toronto Film School
- Denmark
  - Copenhagen Academy
  - Scandinavian Academy of Fashion Design
- France
  - IFM Paris (Institut Français de la Mode)
  - Ecole de la Chambre Syndicale de la Couture Parisienne
  - ESMOD
  - Studio Berçot
- Georgia
  - Tbilisi State Academy of Arts
- Germany
  - AMD Academy of Fashion and Design
  - Berlin University of the Arts
  - HTW Berlin
  - University of the Arts Bremen
  - Kunstakademie Düsseldorf
  - Giebichenstein Castle Academy of Arts in Halle
  - Academy of Fine Arts, Karlsruhe
  - Academy of Fine Arts, Munich
  - Academy of Fine Arts, Nuremberg
  - Design Hochschule Schwerin & Leipzig
- Hong Kong
  - Hong Kong Polytechnic University
- Ireland
  - Limerick School of Art and Design
  - National College of Art and Design
- India
  - ICAT Design & Media College
  - National Institute of Fashion Technology
  - Amity University, Mumbai
  - Pearl Academy of Fashion
  - National Institute of Design
  - Woxsen University
- Italy
  - Istituto Marangoni
  - Politecnico of Milan
  - Domus Academy
  - Nuova Accademia di Belle Arti
  - Istituto Europeo di Design
  - University Iuav of Venice
  - Istituto di Moda Burgo
- Israel
  - Shenkar College of Engineering and Design
- Japan
  - Bunka Fashion College
  - Sugino Fashion College
- Mexico
  - Monterrey Center for Higher Learning of Design
- Pakistan
  - Pakistan Institute of Fashion and Design
- Poland
  - Cracow School of Art and Fashion Design
- Romania
  - Gheorghe Asachi Technical University of Iași
  - George Enescu University of Arts of Iași
  - Art and Design University of Cluj-Napoca
  - West University of Timișoara - Faculty of Fine Arts and Design
- The Netherlands
  - ArtEZ University of the Arts Arnhem
- Turkey
  - İzmir University of Economics
- United Kingdom
  - England
    - London
      - Central Saint Martins College of Art and Design
      - Condé Nast College of Fashion & Design
      - Royal College of Art
      - Kingston University
      - Middlesex University
      - London College of Fashion
      - University of Westminster
      - University of the Arts London
      - Ravensbourne College of Design and Communication
    - University of Brighton
    - De Montfort University
    - Richmond University
    - Bradford College
    - University for the Creative Arts (Rochester & Epsom)
    - Birmingham City University
  - Nottingham
    - Nottingham Trent University
  - Scotland
    - Heriot-Watt School of Textiles and Design, Edinburgh
    - The Glasgow School of Art
    - Edinburgh College of Art
- United States
  - Istituto Marangoni Miami, Florida
  - The University of Alabama in Tuscaloosa, Alabama
  - Clark Atlanta University in Atlanta, Georgia
  - Parsons The New School for Design in New York City, New York
  - Portland Fashion Institute in Portland, Oregon
  - Fashion Institute of Technology in New York City, New York
  - Savannah College of Art and Design in Savannah, Georgia
  - Drexel University in Philadelphia, Pennsylvania
  - Pratt Institute in New York City, New York
  - NC State University Wilson College of Textiles in Raleigh, North Carolina
  - Rhode Island School of Design in Providence, Rhode Island
  - Kent State University in Kent, Ohio
  - Otis College of Art & Design in Los Angeles, California
  - California College of the Arts in San Francisco, California
  - Philadelphia University in Philadelphia, Pennsylvania
  - University of Delaware in Newark, Delaware
  - Academy of Art University in San Francisco, California
  - Fashion Institute of Design & Merchandising in Los Angeles, San Francisco, San Diego and Irvine, California
  - School of the Art Institute of Chicago in Chicago, Illinois
  - Columbus College of Art and Design in Columbus, Ohio
  - Columbia College Chicago in Chicago, Illinois
  - El Centro College in Dallas, Texas
  - Middle Tennessee State University in Murfreesboro, Tennessee
  - O'More College of Design in Franklin, Tennessee
  - Virginia Commonwealth University in Richmond, Virginia
  - Woodbury University in Burbank, California
  - Lasell University in Newton, Massachusetts
  - Cornell University in Ithaca, New York

Elsewhere in the world, Shih Chien University and Fu Jen Catholic University in Taiwan and the Asian University chain, Raffles College of Design and Commerce, all offer fashion design courses.

There are many universities that offer fashion design throughout the United States, usually within the context of a general liberal arts degree. The major concentration incorporating fashion design may have alternative names like Apparel and Textiles or Apparel and Textile Design, and may be housed in departments such as Art and Art History, or Family and Consumer Studies. Some schools, such as Parsons, offer a major in Fashion Management, combining fashion education with business courses.
