= Globke =

Globke is a surname. Notable people with the surname include:

- Hans Globke (1898–1973), German lawyer, civil servant, and politician
- Rob Globke (born 1982), American ice hockey player
