= H. Carl McCall =

American politician

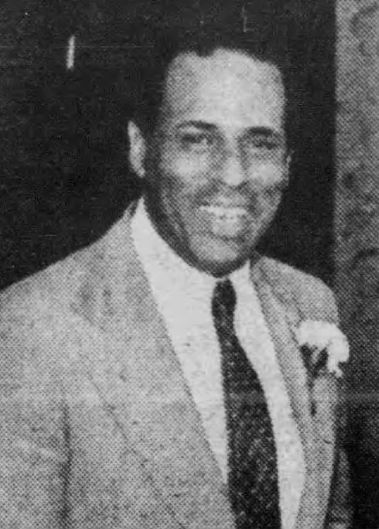
- McCall in 1983

52nd Comptroller of New York
- In office May 7, 1993 – December 31, 2002
- Governor: Mario Cuomo; George Pataki
- Preceded by: Ned Regan
- Succeeded by: Alan Hevesi

Member of the New York Senate from the 28th district
- In office January 1, 1975 – December 31, 1979
- Preceded by: Sidney von Luther
- Succeeded by: Leon Bogues

Personal details
- Born: Herman Carl McCall; October 17, 1935 (age 91) Boston, Massachusetts, U.S.
- Party: Democratic
- Spouse(s): Cecilia McCall (divorced) Joyce Brown (m. 1983)
- Education: Dartmouth College (BA); Andover Newton Theological School (MDiv)

Military service
- Allegiance: United States
- Branch/service: United States Army
- Years of service: 1959

Herman Carl McCall (born October 17, 1935) is an American politician of the Democratic Party. A former New York State Comptroller and New York State Senator, McCall was the Democratic nominee for Governor of New York in 2002.

He was the first African-American to be elected New York State Comptroller. He also served as chairman of the State University of New York Board of Trustees.

== Early life and education ==
McCall was born in the Roxbury section of Boston, Massachusetts. He is the oldest of six children of Herman McCall and Caroleasa Ray. Herman McCall moved to Boston from Georgia and worked as a railroad porter; he abandoned the family when Carl was 11 years of age. Thereafter, the family was supported primarily by welfare and by relatives due to Carl's mother's infirmity.

=== Education ===
McCall graduated from Roxbury Memorial High School in Boston, where he was president of his class. He attended Dartmouth College on private and ROTC scholarships, graduating in 1958 with a bachelor's degree in government. McCall was also educated at the University of Edinburgh and received a Master of Divinity (M.Div.) Degree from Andover Newton Theological School.

== Early career ==
During the 1960s, McCall worked as a high school teacher and a bank manager. He taught for six months at Jamaica Plain High School on Sumner Hill in Boston, and then joined the Army. He opened a church in the Dorchester neighborhood. By the late 1960s, McCall had moved to New York City. He was appointed by New York Mayor John Lindsay to head the Commission Against Poverty.

== Political career ==
=== State Senate ===
McCall was elected to three terms as a State Senator representing Harlem and the Upper West Side of Manhattan. He was a member of the New York State Senate from 1975 to 1980, sitting in the 181st, 182nd and 183rd New York State Legislatures.

He left the Senate to accept an appointment from President Jimmy Carter as a member of the U.S. delegation to the United Nations with the rank of Ambassador.

In 1982, McCall was an unsuccessful candidate for the Democratic nomination for Lieutenant Governor of New York. Governor Mario Cuomo then appointed McCall to serve as the state's Commissioner of Human Rights (1983–84).

While in the private sector as a vice president for governmental relations with Citicorp from 1985 to 1993, McCall accepted an appointment to the New York City Board of Education, where he was President of the Board from 1991 to 1993.

=== New York State Comptroller ===
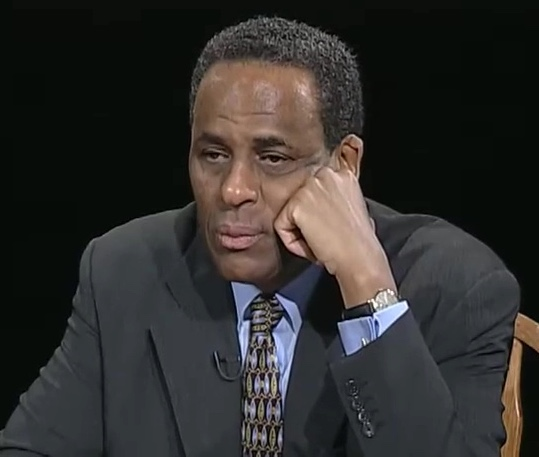
McCall on CUNY TV's The Urban Agenda, 2000

In 1993, McCall was selected by the New York State Legislature to fill the unexpired term of Republican Edward Regan as state comptroller. McCall was elected to a full term as comptroller in 1994 (defeating Conservative Herbert London) and was re-elected in 1998 (defeating Republican Bruce Blakeman). In 1998, he announced that he would not seek election to the U.S. Senate in 2000.

=== 2002 campaign for Governor of New York ===
In 2002, McCall announced his campaign against Republican incumbent Governor George Pataki. McCall was the favorite of the Democratic establishment, but he faced a tough challenge from Andrew Cuomo which almost split the party. Cuomo proved to be a better fundraiser, and McCall's own campaign war chest was heavily depleted in the primary battle. Although McCall himself did not make any negative attacks, his close supporter, US Congressman Charles B. Rangel, stated that the McCall camp would not necessarily endorse Cuomo in the general election should the latter win. This backfired as some Italian-Americans interpreted that as racism, and many of Cuomo's supporters refused to unite behind McCall after McCall won the nomination. McCall was endorsed by Senator Chuck Schumer. While Senator Hillary Clinton did not officially take sides during the primary, she loaned a staffer and a fundraiser to McCall's campaign and she marched by McCall's side at the West Indian American Day parade in New York City, as Clinton wanted to retain strong African-American support in case she made a presidential run in the future. Cuomo withdrew from the primary race after McCall moved to a double-digit lead in polls.

==== Letterhead controversy ====
In October 2002, McCall released 61 letters he had written on state letterhead to heads of companies in which the state pension fund owned large blocks of stock, asking them to review enclosed resumes of his relatives and other job-seekers.

Some of the letters referred to the size of the state's ownership interest in the corporation targeted, which critics claimed amounted to a veiled threat to punish companies that didn't hire his relatives. A Quinnipiac poll released October 16 showed that two-thirds of likely voters were aware of the letters and of those more than a fifth were less likely to vote for McCall as a result.

McCall defended the letters. Although he did issue a statement regretting the "appearance" and "impression" of the letters he wrote on government stationery, he maintained that he "never sought to leverage my public position nor mix my government role with my personal and professional relationship" in the letters. McCall's daughter, Marci, was hired by Verizon, which received such a letter, but was subsequently fired for using her company credit card to pay for substantial personal expenditures. Charges of larceny against her were dropped after some reimbursement to Verizon, and she was then hired as a marketer by McCall's running mate, Dennis Mehiel.

==== Results ====
McCall was defeated by Pataki in November 2002. McCall received 33% of the vote, a low percentage for a Democratic nominee for statewide office in a state where the Democratic Party is by far the dominant party based on voter registrations.

Other political commentators attribute McCall's defeat to the growing popularity of the Republican Party after the terrorist attacks of September 11, 2001, along with Pataki's successful administration of the state.

== Later career ==
McCall has served as a member of the Board of the New York Stock Exchange (1999–2003), as well as the Apollo Theater Foundation, Inc. and the Fiscal Control Board for Buffalo, New York. He has also served on the board of directors of TYCO International, New Plan Realty, TAG Entertainment Corporation, Ariel Mutual Fund, and the New York State Public Higher Education Conference Board, respectively.

In January 2007, McCall was appointed to a panel, along with former New York State Comptroller Ned Regan and former New York City Comptroller Harrison Jay Goldin, to interview and recommend up to five candidates to the State Legislature to replace Alan Hevesi, who resigned as state comptroller due to scandal.

In May 2009, Convent Capital, the financial services firm run by McCall, was subpoenaed, along with other unregistered placement agents, by state Attorney General Andrew Cuomo's office as part of an inquiry into possible corruption involved in deals brokered between investment firms and the state pension fund.

McCall joined the State University of New York Board of Trustees on October 22, 2007. He was appointed to the Board by Governor Spitzer. McCall was appointed chairman on October 17, 2011, by Governor Cuomo. He announced his retirement in April 2019, effective at the end of June. He was succeeded as chair by vice chair Merryl Tisch.

== Personal life ==
McCall's first marriage—to Cecilia McCall, the mother of his daughter Marcella (Marci)--ended in divorce. In 1983, McCall married his second wife, Joyce F. Brown; Brown is a former psychology professor, was a Deputy Mayor of New York City under Mayor David Dinkins, and is president of SUNY's Fashion Institute of Technology in New York City. They have no children.

McCall is a member of the Alpha Phi Alpha fraternity.

== Awards ==
McCall is the recipient of nine honorary degrees. In 2003, he was awarded the Nelson Rockefeller Distinguished Public Service Award from the Rockefeller College of Public Affairs and Policy at the University of Albany.

On February 14, 2020, the SUNY Plaza administrative building was renamed the H. Carl McCall SUNY Building in honor of McCall's "long standing contributions to SUNY and New York State."

== See also ==
- List of people from Harlem

New York State Senate
Preceded by Sidney von Luther	Member of the New York Senate from the 28th district 1975–1980	Succeeded by Leon Bogues
Political offices
Preceded by Ned Regan	Comptroller of New York; 1993–2002	Succeeded by Alan Hevesi
Party political offices
Preceded by Carol Bellamy	Democratic nominee for New York State Comptroller; 1994, 1998	Succeeded by Alan Hevesi
Preceded by Peter Vallone	Democratic nominee for Governor of New York; 2002	Succeeded by Eliot Spitzer
