= Ray's Ragtime =

Vintage store in Portland, Oregon, U.S.

Coordinates: 45.53565°N 122.62133°W

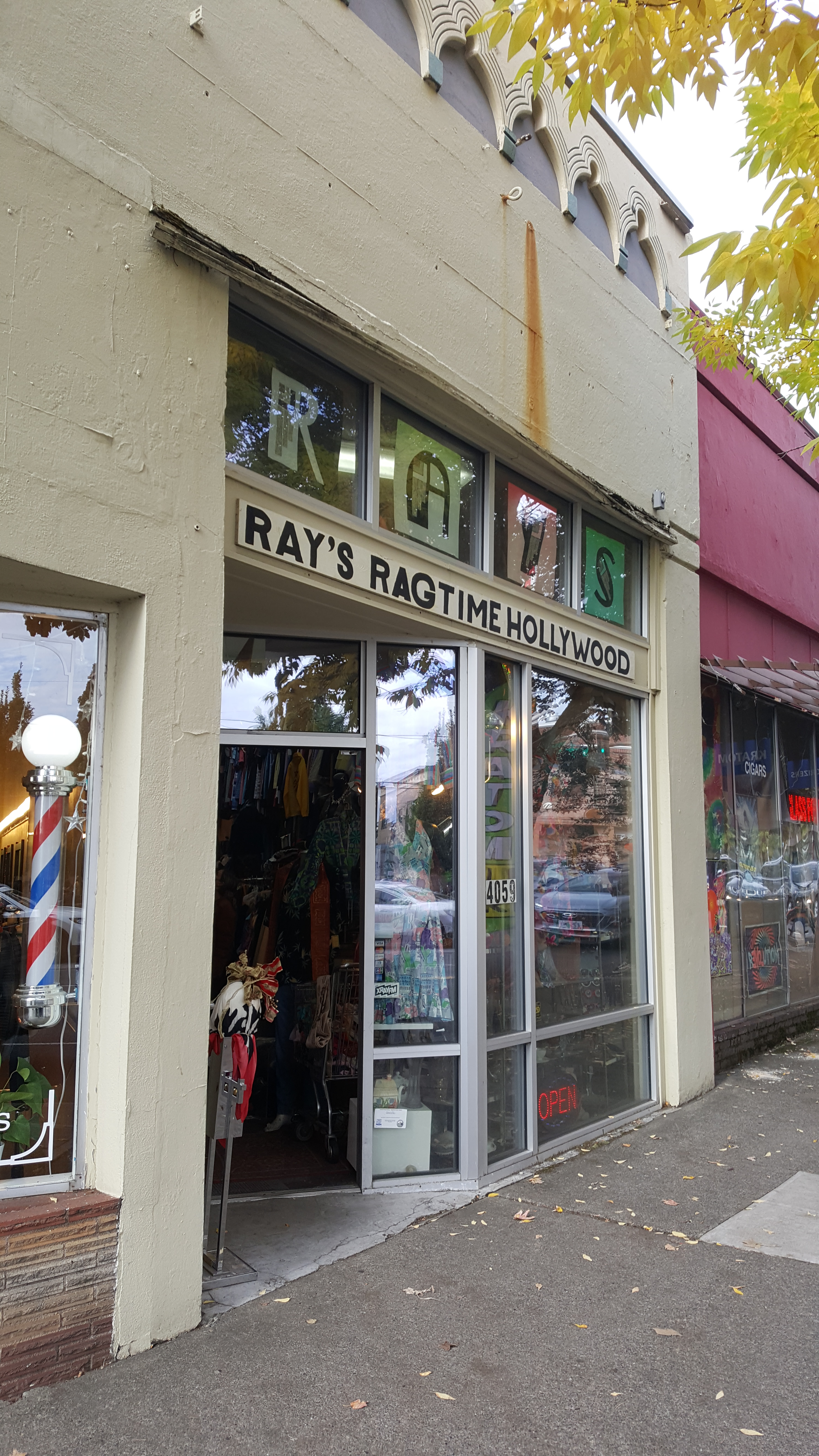
- The store's exterior in 2021
- Founded: 1986; 39 years ago in Portland, Oregon, United States
- Founder: Ray Tillotson
- Owner: Lisa Beyer

Ray's Ragtime is a vintage store in Portland, Oregon, United States.

== History ==
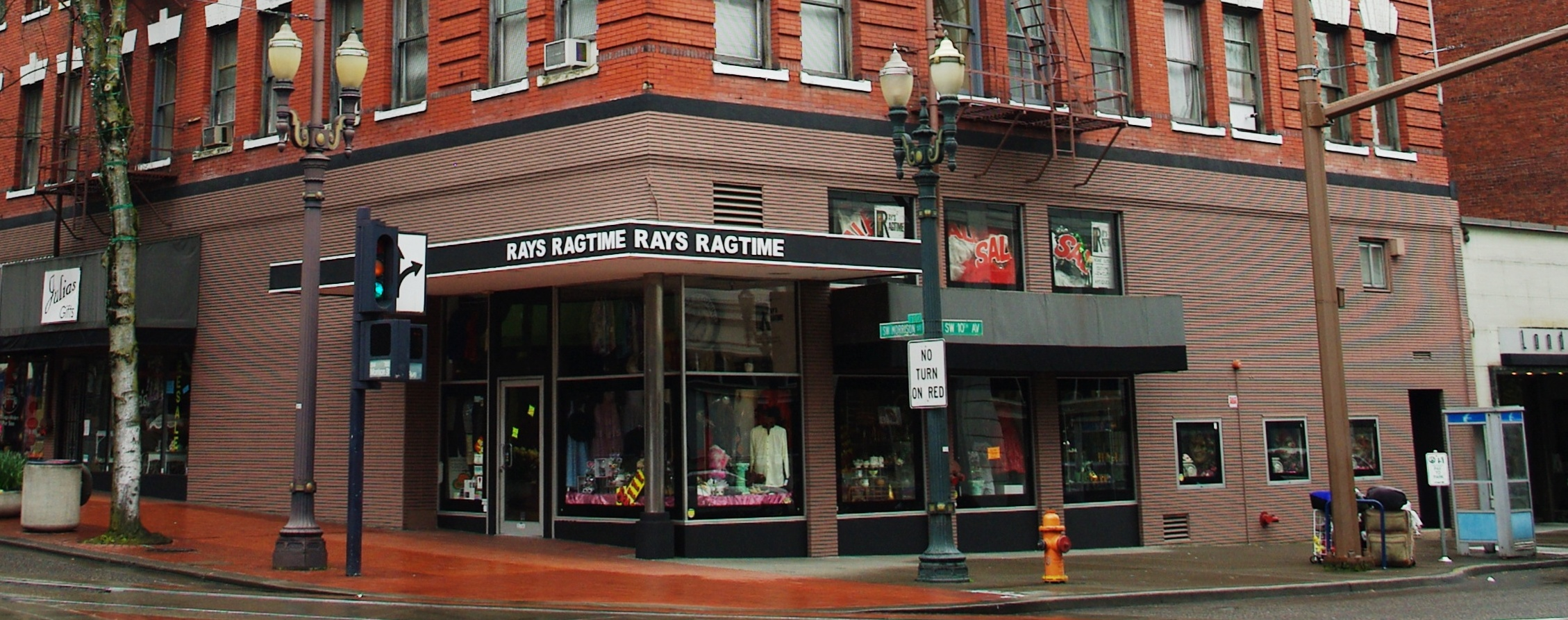
Ray's Ragtime operated in the Fine Arts Building (pictured in 2011) from 1986 to 2016

Ray Tillotson founded and continued to own the business, as of 2016. The store occupied the ground level of the Fine Arts Building at the intersection of 10th and Morrison in southwest Portland from 1986 to 2016, when operations were relocated to the Hollywood neighborhood in northeast Portland because of high rent costs. The new location is smaller but has a similar aesthetic as the original. Lisa Beyer was the owner, as of 2018, when the business was burglarized. Since relocating, the store has been called Ray's Ragtime Hollywood.

According to Willamette Week's Matthew Korfhage, "Ragtime had long been a stopover for bands playing at the Crystal Ballroom, and was beloved among the local music community, including—at one time—Courtney Love, along with Courtney Taylor-Taylor of the Dandy Warhols." In his 2017 "ultimate guide to Portland's vintage shopping scene", Christopher Dibble of Portland Monthly called Ray's "a piece of local history". The store has been included in guide books of Portland.
