= 1994 New York State Comptroller election =

- November 8, 1994
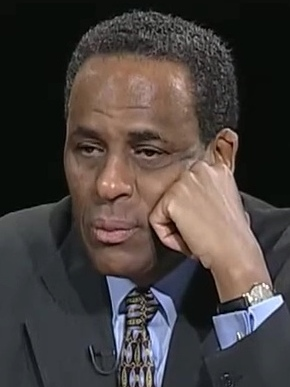

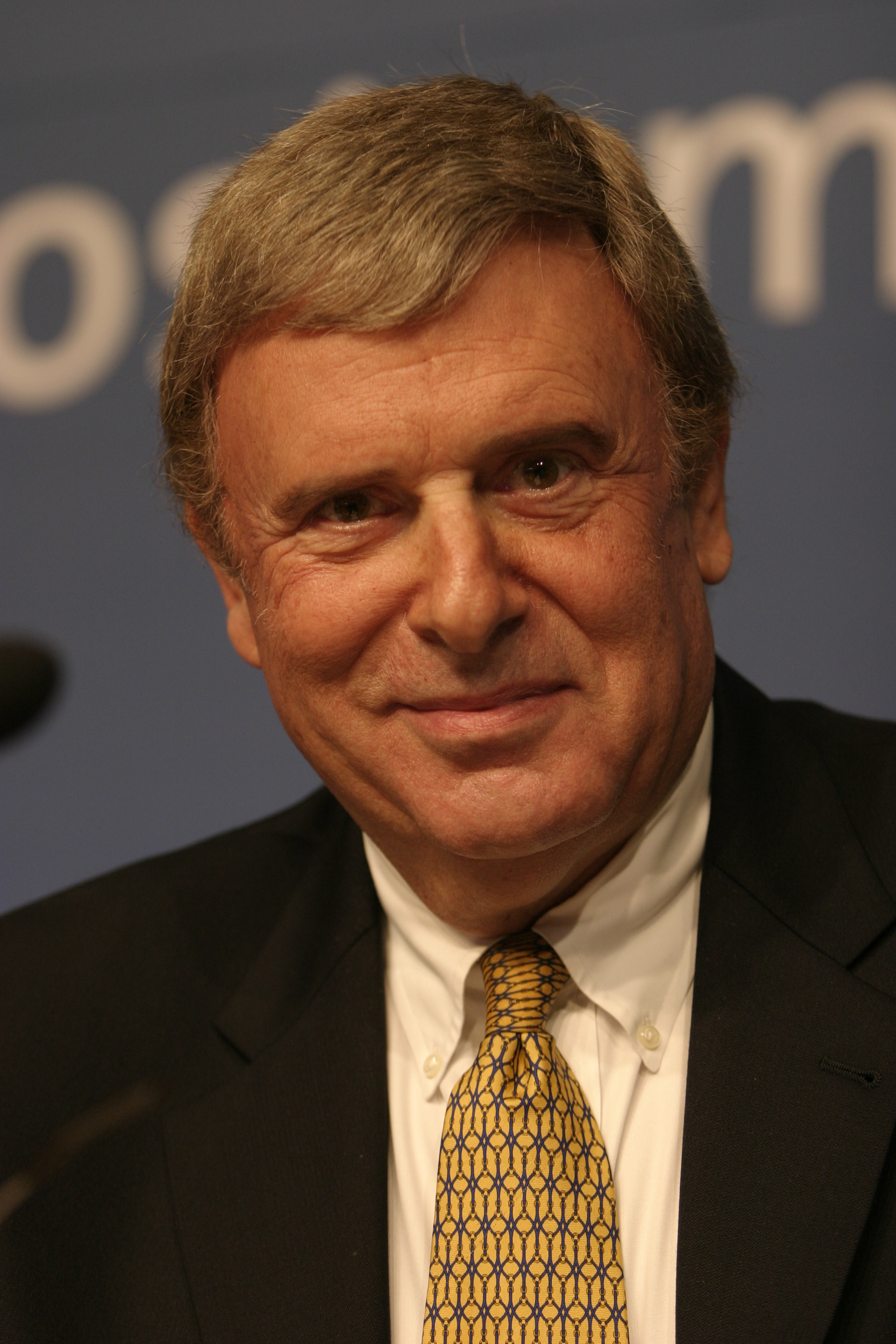
Nominee	Carl McCall	Herbert London
Party	Democratic	Republican
Alliance	Liberal	Various: Conservative; Tax Cut Now; Right to Life
Popular vote	2,404,404	2,155,759
Percentage	51.80%	46.44%
- County results McCall: 50–60% 60–70% 70–80% 80–90% London: 40–50% 50–60% 60–70% 70-80%
New York Comptroller before election
Carl McCall
Democratic
Elected New York Comptroller
Carl McCall
Democratic

The 1994 New York State Comptroller election took place on November 8, 1994. Democratic nominee and incumbent comptroller Carl McCall narrowly defeated Republican nominee Herbert London.

== General election ==
=== Results ===
1994 New York State Comptroller general election results
Party	Candidate	Votes	%
Democratic	Carl McCall	2,299,127	49.53
Liberal	Carl McCall	105,277	2.27
Total	Carl McCall (incumbent)	2,404,404	51.80
Republican	Herbert London	1,748,414	37.66
Conservative	Herbert London	282,922	6.09
Right to Life	Herbert London	124,423	2.68
Total	Herbert London	2,155,759	46.44
Independence	Laureen Oliver	53,801	1.16
Libertarian	Richard Geyer	17,986	0.39
Socialist Workers	Brock Satter	10,078	0.22
Majority		248,645	5.36
Turnout		4,642,028	
Democratic hold			

== See also ==
Preceded by 1990	New York Comptroller election 1994	Succeeded by 1998
