= Joyce F. Brown =

American academic

- Brown in 2017

6th President of the Fashion Institute of Technology
- In office 1998–2026
- Preceded by: Allan F. Hershfield
- Succeeded by: Jason S. Schupbach

Personal details
- Born: July 7, 1947 (age 79) New York City, US
- Spouse: H. Carl McCall
- Education: Marymount College (BA); New York University (MS, PhD)
- Scientific career
- Fields: School counseling
- Thesis: Social mobility as a function of college attendance and other achievement related behaviors (1980)

Joyce Frances Brown was the 6th president of the Fashion Institute of Technology at the State University of New York, a post she served from June 1998 until December 2025.

== Early life and education ==
Born in New York City, Brown attended parochial schools.

Brown received a Bachelor of Arts from Marymount College in Tarrytown, New York, in 1968, and then a master's degree in counseling psychology in 1971 and a Doctor of Philosophy in 1980 from New York University. Her doctoral dissertation was in school counseling, titled Social mobility as a function of college attendance and other achievement related behaviors (1980).

== Career ==
Brown was the president of the Fashion Institute of Technology at the State University of New York, and CEO of the Educational Foundation for the Fashion Industries, in New York City since 1998 to December of 2025. She has been on numerous corporate boards, including the Boards of Directors of Neuberger Berman, and the Paxar Corporation, and is on the boards of USEC, Inc. and the Polo Ralph Lauren Corporation.

Brown was a professor of Clinical Psychology at the Graduate School and University Center of the City University of New York from 1994 to 1998. She is now professor emerita.

During David Dinkins' term as Mayor of New York City, Brown was deputy mayor for public and community affairs (1993–94).

Brown was appointed Dean of Urban Affairs at Bernard Baruch College of the City University of New York (CUNY) in 1983 and held the position until 1987. She coordinated the Urban Summit of Big City Mayors during her tenure and was appointed acting President of the college in 1990 (Brotherton, Phaedra, "FIT to be President" Black Enterprise, July 1999).

== Personal life ==
She is married to Carl McCall, who was New York State Comptroller from 1993 to 2002 and ran as the Democratic candidate for Governor of New York in 2002.
