= John Coyle (speed skater) =

American short-track speed skater

John K. Coyle
Personal information
- Full name: John Keithan Coyle
- Born: August 18, 1968 (age 57) Warren, Michigan, U.S.
Medal record
Men's short track speed skating
Representing the United States
Olympic Games
Silver medal – second place	1994 Lillehammer	5000 m relay

John Keithan Coyle (born August 18, 1968) is an American short track speedskater who was part of the U.S. silver medal-winning relay team at the 1994 Winter Olympics. He is also an author, speaker and Design Thinking expert.

== Early life and education ==
Coyle was born in Warren, Michigan and moved to West Bloomfield, Michigan when he was five years old and lived there until college. Coyle completed his primary and secondary school years at Southfield Christian School in Southfield, Michigan. He graduated with a B. S honors in Engineering- Product Design (1986) from Stanford University. His academic advisor was David M. Kelley, the founder of the Stanford University's Hasso Plattner Institute of Design at Stanford - known as the school and the design firm IDEO. Coyle earned an MBA in Marketing, Organizational Behavior and Entrepreneurship from The Kellogg School of Management at Northwestern University in 1997.

== Beginnings and sports career ==
As a young athlete, Coyle competed in a variety of sports, including BMX, skateboarding, cross country skiing, short- and long-track speed skating, and track and road cycling, the latter of which were with The Wolverine Sports Club in Detroit, trained by coach Mike Walden. In his early teens, Coyle was the Michigan state champion simultaneously in seven sports. He went on to become an internationally competitive cyclist, winning the U.S. Junior Cycling Championships in 1986, and placing 10th that year at the World Junior Championships in Casablanca, Morocco. That same year he made his first national speedskating team and competed in the World short track speedskating championships in Amsterdam, Netherlands. Coyle was a member of the U.S. National Cycling team, the 7-11 Cycling team, the U.S. National Speedskating team for several years and has won the Michigan State Cycling Championships six times.

As a senior at Stanford, while studying full-time in California, Coyle finished in 12th place at the World Short Track Speedskating Championships in Amsterdam, Netherlands. After graduation he focused on speedskating full-time for the next four years. Before the 1994 Winter Olympic Games, Coyle's best international short-track finish was a bronze medal at the 1993 World Winter University Games in the relay. The following year, as a member of the American relay team, Coyle won the silver medal in the 5000-meter relay competition in the Winter Olympic Games in Lillehammer, Norway. In 1995, Coyle set US records at the US trials in the 444m time trial, the 1000m time trial, the 500m, and the 1000m and unofficially skated a second under the world record in the 1000m.

Since retiring from competitive sports, Coyle has provided on-air commentary and support to NBC as an Olympic Sports Television Analyst for the 2006, 2010 and 2014 Olympic games broadcasts. His on-air support also includes several features with Summer Sanders and Jeremy Bloom.

== Post-Sports Career & Writing/Speaking ==
After obtaining his MBA, Coyle became a consultant at Diamond Management & Technology Consultants, helping clients including Goldman Sachs, Enron and AOL/Time Warner to build new business models. He then joined the mobile telecom company, U.S. Cellular, where he eventually became the head of innovation. Following that, he joined Maddock Douglas, an agency of innovation, where he was the Senior Vice President of innovation and continues to serve as a Fellow.

Coyle is the founder and CEO of The Art of Really Living, a platform exploring the intersection of strengths, resiliency and the cognitive perception of time. Coyle is active in the fields of chronoception and horology.

Coyle is also the author of Design For Strengths: Applying Design Thinking to Individual and Team Strengths, which explores the concepts of design thinking and strength-finding to help individuals learn problem solving methods that lead to breakthrough performance. He also wrote a book and produced a video called The Art of Really Living Time Manifesto.

Coyle teaches innovation courses and has lectured at Northwestern University, Marquette University and at the CEDIM University Graduate School center for design, innovation and business in Monterrey, Nuevo León, Mexico.

Coyle is a two-time TEDx presenter, and gave a keynote for the 2015 Chicago Ideas Week Edison Talks. His current occupation is writing books, and delivering keynote speeches, workshops and summits in the fields of design thinking, strengths, resiliency, innovation, leadership development and chronoception. He has been featured in Fast Company, Strategy+Business, and Playboy.

== Awards ==
1994 Winter Olympic Games - 5000m relay (Silver Medal)

1995 World Team Championships (Bronze Medal)

2018 AzBee Award for Best Web How-To Article (National Silver)
