= Fine Arts Building (Portland, Oregon) =

Historic building in Portland, Oregon, U.S.

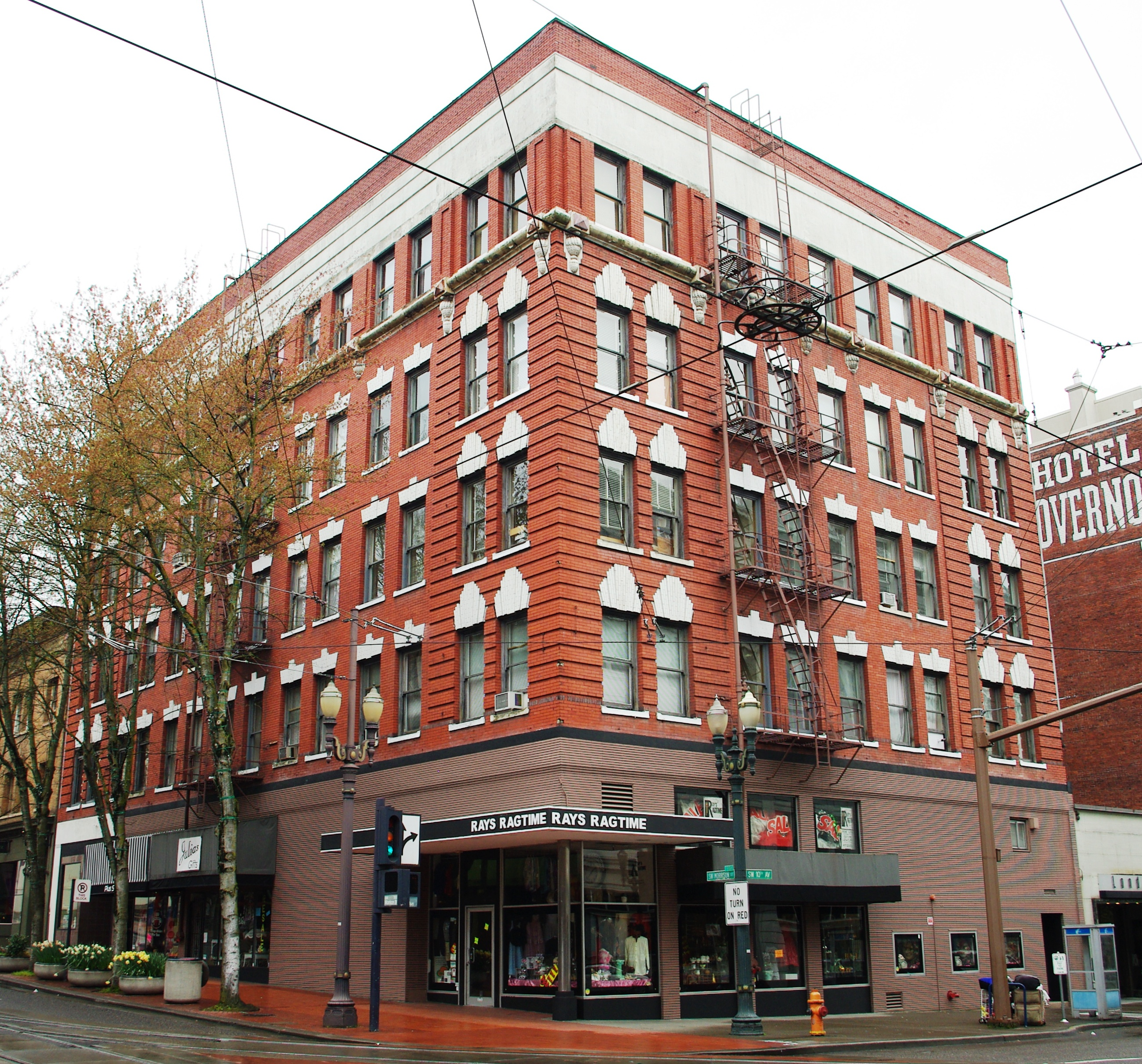
- The building's exterior with Ray's Ragtime in the ground floor in 2011
- Interactive map of the Fine Arts Building area

General information
- Location: Portland, Oregon, United States
- Coordinates: 45°31′13″N 122°40′56.5″W

The Fine Arts Building is a low-rise, 6-story historic building located at 1017 Southwest Morrison Street in downtown Portland, Oregon, United States. Completed in 1906, the Fine Arts Building has long been home to studios of Portland teaching musicians, artists and artisans. During the 1970s, the popular Alpha-Centauri book store operated in the ground level of the building. The vintage clothing store Ray's Ragtime was located on the building's ground floor from 1986 to 2016.
