= Hollywood Boosters =

Business district association in Portland, Oregon

Hollywood Boosters Business Association
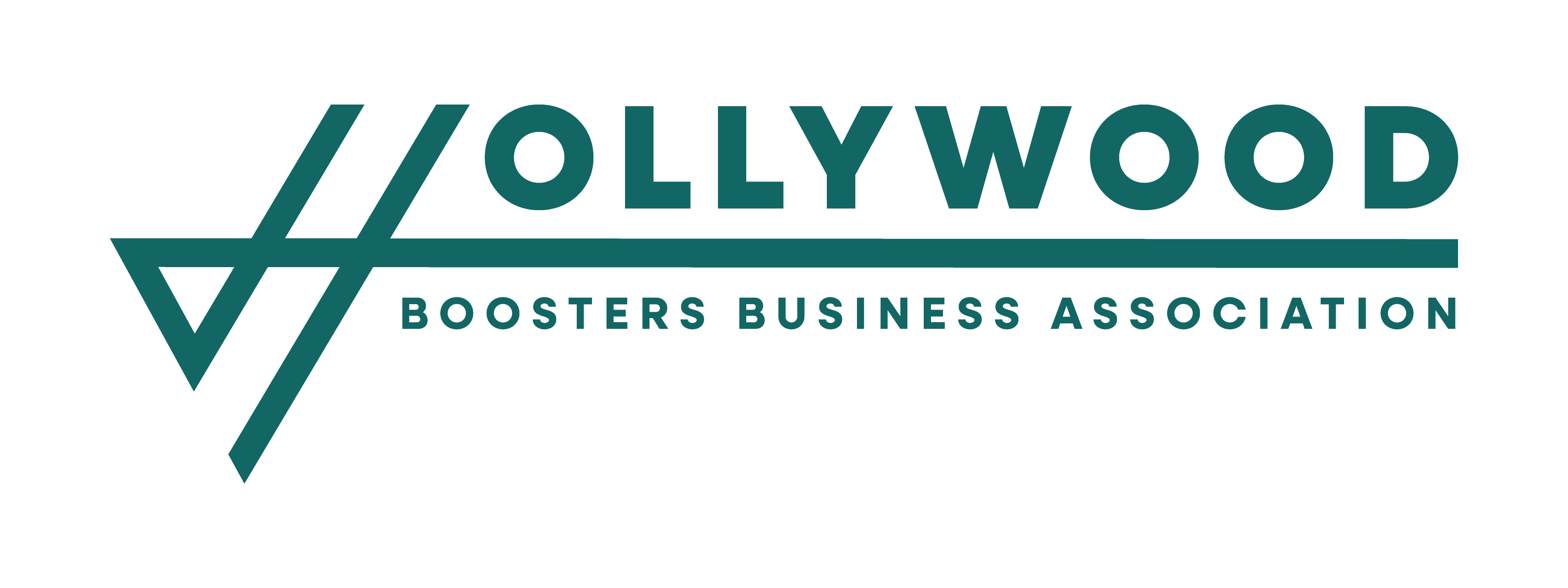
- Formation: March 16, 1934 (92 years ago)
- Type: Neighborhood Business District Association
- Location: Hollywood District, Portland, OR
- Website: hollywoodboosters.com

The Hollywood Boosters Business Association (HBBA) is a nonprofit organization based in the Hollywood District of Portland, Oregon. Founded in 1934, it is recognized as one of the City of Portland's oldest continuously operating neighborhood business district association. The group consists of local merchants, service providers, and civic volunteers who promote business vitality, coordinate public events, and contribute to neighborhood beautification.

== History ==
The Hollywood Boosters were founded on March 16th, 1934 by 52 local merchants seeking to stimulate economic activity in the Hollywood District during the Great Depression. The organization quickly became known for coordinating community events and advocating for local improvements.

One of its earliest and most enduring contributions was helping organize the first Junior Rose Parade in 1936. Now billed as the oldest and largest children's parade in the United States, the event continues annually through the support of the Boosters, who assist with logistics, outreach, and merchant involvement.

Throughout the 1950s and 1960s, the Boosters hosted high-profile guests, including television host Ed Sullivan in 1954 and cowboy actor Montie Montana in 1955. The group was also responsible for seasonal decorations, sidewalk festivals, and business advocacy during a period of growing competition from suburban malls.

In the 1980s and 1990s, the Boosters expanded their focus to include civic engagement and planning. They contributed to Portland's Hollywood and Sandy Plan (1988) and were involved in the creation and maintenance of Harold P. Kelly Plaza, named in honor to the past Booster President, a pedestrian space near NE Sandy Boulevard. They also installed decorative planters and street banners and participated in the formation of the citywide Alliance of Portland Neighborhood Business Associations (now Venture Portland).

== Signage and Public Presence ==
The Boosters are credited with installing and maintaining the large "Hollywood" sign at the Hollywood/NE 42nd Avenue Transit Center MAX station in Northeast Portland. This sign became a recognizable landmark near the station’s entrance and symbolized the commercial identity of the district. In 2023, the sign was removed due to TriMet’s redevelopment of the site into the hollywoodHUB project. TriMet preserved the letters and later reinstalled them along a new accessible ramp as part of the transit center redesign.

== Community Events and Activities ==
In addition to the Junior Rose Parade, the Hollywood Boosters have organized or supported events including:

- Hollywood at Night – a monthly late-night shopping and entertainment event launched in 2006
- Veterans Day Parade – supported in coordination with local veterans organizations
- Neighborhood cleanups and public art projects, including mural sponsorships and planter installations

The association has also served as an advocate for small business issues, participating in initiatives related to parking, safety, economic recovery, and homelessness response.

== Organization ==
The Boosters are governed by an elected board of directors composed of local business owners and professionals. Meetings are held regularly and are open to members. As of 2025, the organization includes more than 40 active member businesses and continues to operate as a volunteer-run nonprofit.

== Legacy and Recognition ==
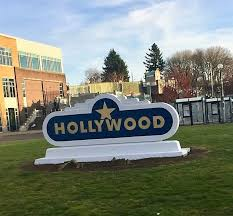

The Hollywood Boosters are widely credited with helping define the identity and resilience of the Hollywood District. Their stewardship of public space, community tradition, and visual branding—such as the Hollywood sign—has left a lasting mark on the neighborhood's streetscape and civic culture.

== See also ==
- Hollywood District (Portland, Oregon)
- Portland Rose Festival
