= Electoral history of Nita Lowey =

List of elections featuring Nita Lowey as a candidate

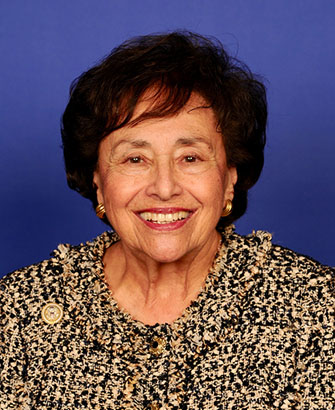
Nita Lowey's congressional portrait from the 116th Congress.

This is the electoral history of Nita Lowey, who served as a U.S. Representative from New York from 1989 to 2021. Lowey has represented New York's 20th congressional district from 1989 to 1993, the 18th district from 1993 to 2013, and the 17th district from 2013 to 2021.

== New York's 20th Congressional District ==
=== 1988 ===
New York's 20th Congressional District 1988 General Election
Party	Candidate	Votes	%
Democratic	Nita M. Lowey	102,235	50.30%
Republican	Joe DioGuardi	-	-
Conservative	Joe DioGuardi	-	-
Total	Joe DioGuardi (incumbent)	96,465	47.46%
Right to Life	Florence T. O'Grady	2,932	1.44%
Liberal	Henry M. Levine	1,631	0.80%
Total votes		203,263	100%
Democratic gain from Republican			

=== 1990 ===
New York's 20th Congressional District 1990 General Election
Party	Candidate	Votes	%
Democratic	Nita M. Lowey (incumbent)	82,203	62.84%
Republican	Glenn D. Bellitto	35,575	27.20%
Conservative	John M. Schafer	-	-
Right to Life	John M. Schafer	-	-
Total	John M. Schafer	13,030	9.96%
Total votes		130,808	100%
Democratic hold			

== New York's 18th Congressional District ==
=== 1992 ===
New York's 18th Congressional District 1992 General Election
Party	Candidate	Votes	%
Democratic	Nita M. Lowey (incumbent)	115,841	55.55%
Republican	Joe DioGuardi	74,076	35.52%
Conservative	Joe DioGuardi	11,027	5.29%
Right to Life	Joe DioGuardi	7,584	3.64%
Total	Joe DioGuardi	92,687	44.45%
Total votes		208,528	100%
Democratic hold			

=== 1994 ===
New York's 18th Congressional District 1994 General Election
Party	Candidate	Votes	%
Democratic	Nita M. Lowey (incumbent)	91,663	57.27%
Republican	Andrew C. Hartzell Jr.	55,636	34.76%
Conservative	Andrew C. Hartzell Jr.	9,881	6.17%
Total	Andrew C. Hartzell Jr.	65,517	40.93%
Right to Life	Florence T. O'Grady	2,873	1.80%
Total votes		160,053	100%
Democratic hold			

=== 1996 ===
New York's 18th Congressional District 1996 General Election
Party	Candidate	Votes	%
Democratic	Nita M. Lowey (incumbent)	118,194	63.64%
Republican	Kerry J. Katsorhis	51,656	27.81%
Conservative	Kerry J. Katsorhis	7,831	4.21%
Total	Kerry J. Katsorhis	59,487	32.03%
Independence	Concetta M. Ferrara	4,283	2.31%
Right to Life	Florence T. O'Grady	3,758	2.02%
Total votes		185,722	100%
Democratic hold			

=== 1998 ===
New York's 18th Congressional District 1998 General Election
Party	Candidate	Votes	%
Democratic	Nita M. Lowey (incumbent)	91,623	82.77%
Conservative	Daniel McMahon	12,594	11.38%
Independence	Guilio A. Cavallo	3,251	2.93%
Right to Life	Marion M. Conner	3,234	2.92%
Total votes		110,702	100%
Democratic hold			

=== 2000 ===
New York's 18th Congressional District 2000 General Election
Party	Candidate	Votes	%
Democratic	Nita M. Lowey (incumbent)	126,878	67.26%
Republican	John G. Vonglis	52,923	28.05%
Conservative	John G. Vonglis	5,099	2.70%
Total	John G. Vonglis	58,022	30.76%
Right to Life	Florence T. O'Grady	3,747	1.99%
Total votes		188,647	100%
Democratic hold			

=== 2002 ===
New York's 18th Congressional District 2002 General Election
Party	Candidate	Votes	%
Democratic	Nita M. Lowey	95,396	88.73%
Working Families	Nita M. Lowey	3,561	3.31%
Total	Nita M. Lowey (incumbent)	98,957	92.04%
Right to Life	Michael J. Reynolds	8,558	8.00%
Total votes		107,515	100%
Democratic hold			

=== 2004 ===
New York's 18th Congressional District 2004 General Election
Party	Candidate	Votes	%
Democratic	Nita M. Lowey	159,072	65.01%
Independence	Nita M. Lowey	7,271	2.97%
Working Families	Nita M. Lowey	4,372	1.79%
Total	Nita M. Lowey (incumbent)	170,715	69.77%
Republican	Richard A. Hoffman	73,975	30.23%
Total votes		244,690	100%
Democratic hold			

=== 2006 ===
New York's 18th Congressional District 2006 General Election
Party	Candidate	Votes	%
Democratic	Nita M. Lowey	119,041	67.75%
Working Families	Nita M. Lowey	5,215	2.97%
Total	Nita M. Lowey (incumbent)	124,256	70.72%
Republican	Richard A. Hoffman	45,472	25.88%
Conservative	Richard A. Hoffman	5,978	3.40%
Total	Richard A. Hoffman	51,450	29.28%
Total votes		175,706	100%
Democratic hold			

=== 2008 ===
New York's 18th Congressional District 2008 General Election
Party	Candidate	Votes	%
Democratic	Nita M. Lowey	167,365	65.56%
Working Families	Nita M. Lowey	7,426	2.91%
Total	Nita M. Lowey (incumbent)	174,791	68.47%
Republican	Jim Russell	73,237	28.69%
Conservative	Jim Russell	7,261	2.84%
Total	Jim Russell	80,498	31.53%
Total votes		255,289	100%
Democratic hold			

=== 2010 ===
New York's 18th Congressional District 2010 General Election
Party	Candidate	Votes	%
Democratic	Nita M. Lowey	104,095	56.32%
Independence	Nita M. Lowey	5,667	3.06%
Working Families	Nita M. Lowey	5,048	2.73%
Total	Nita M. Lowey (incumbent)	114,810	62.12%
Republican	Jim Russell	60,154	32.55%
Conservative	Jim Russell	9,861	5.33%
Total	Jim Russell	70,015	37.88%
Total votes		184,825	100%
Democratic hold			

== New York's 17th Congressional District ==
=== 2012 ===
New York's 17th Congressional District 2012 General Election
Party	Candidate	Votes	%
Democratic	Nita M. Lowey	161,624	60.74%
Working Families	Nita M. Lowey	9,793	3.68%
Total	Nita M. Lowey (incumbent)	171,417	64.42%
Republican	Joe Carvin	91,899	34.54%
We The People Party	Francis E. Morganthaler	2,771	1.04%
Total votes		266,087	100%
Democratic hold			

=== 2014 ===
New York's 17th Congressional District 2014 General Election
Party	Candidate	Votes	%
Democratic	Nita M. Lowey	89,295	51.34%
Working Families	Nita M. Lowey	8,855	5.09%
Total	Nita M. Lowey (incumbent)	98,150	56.43%
Republican	Christopher E. Day	63,549	36.54%
Conservative	Christopher E. Day	12,232	7.03%
Total	Christopher E. Day	75,781	43.57%
Total votes		173,931	100%
Democratic hold			

=== 2016 ===
New York's 17th Congressional District 2016 General Election
Party	Candidate	Votes	%
Democratic	Nita M. Lowey	193,819	90.35%
Working Families	Nita M. Lowey	15,706	7.32%
Women's Equality	Nita M. Lowey	5,005	2.33%
Total	Nita M. Lowey (incumbent)	214,530	100.00%
Total votes		214,530	100%
Democratic hold			

=== 2018 ===
New York's 17th Congressional District 2018 General Election
Party	Candidate	Votes	%
Democratic	Nita M. Lowey	159,923	82.73%
Working Families	Nita M. Lowey	7,336	3.79%
Women's Equality	Nita M. Lowey	2,909	1.50%
Total	Nita M. Lowey (incumbent)	170,168	88.02%
Reform	Joseph J. Ciardullo	23,150	11.98%
Total votes		193,318	100%
Democratic hold			
