= Southfield Christian School =

Location
- 28650 Lahser Road; Southfield, Michigan 48034; United States
- 42°29′58″N 83°15′39″W

Information
- Type: Private Christian
- Motto: Pursuing Excellence for the Glory of God
- Religious affiliation: Baptist
- Established: 1970
- Head of school: Will Guerra
- Teaching staff: 45.3 (on an FTE basis)
- Grades: PreK-12
- Enrollment: 583 (including 21 PK students) (2017-18)
- Student to teacher ratio: 12.4
- Colors: Blue, Gold
- Athletics conference: Michigan Independent Athletic Conference
- Nickname: Eagles
- Accreditation: Cognia
- Website: www.southfieldchristian.org

Southfield Christian School (SCS) is a private, college-preparatory Christian school in Southfield, Michigan. It is a ministry of Highland Park Baptist Church for grades PK–12.

== History ==
SCS was founded in 1970.

== Academics ==
Southfield Christian has been accredited by Cognia or its predecessors since April 2004.

== Athletics ==
The Southfield Christian Eagles are members of the Michigan Independent Athletic Conference. The following MHSAA high school sports are offered:

- Baseball (boys)
- Basketball (boys & girls)
  - Boys state champions - 2012, 2013, 2014, 2018, 2019
- Competitive Cheer (girls)
- Cross country (boys & girls)
- Football (boys)
- Golf (boys)
- Soccer (boys & girls)
- Softball (girls)
- Track and field (boys & girls)
- Volleyball (girls)

== Notable alumni ==
- John Coyle, speed skater
- Tim Donnelly, California State Assemblyman
- Rob Globke, National Hockey League (NHL) player
- Donovan Peoples-Jones, National Football League (NFL) Player
- Brian Rafalski, NHL player
