= Monterrey Center for Higher Learning of Design =

- Centro de Estudios Superiores de Diseño de Monterrey
- Motto: Mis Ideas Son el Futuro
- Motto in English: My Ideas Are the Future
- Type: private
- Established: 1978
- Affiliations: various
- CEO: Leslie García Novak
- Location: Santa Catarina, Nuevo Leon, Mexico
- Campus: 1
- Colors: grey, black and white
- Website: http://www.cedim.edu.mx
- Is a Mexican university of design

The Monterrey Center for Higher Learning of Design (Spanish: Centro de Estudios Superiores de Diseño de Monterrey, CEDIM) is a university specializing in design, innovation, and business. Its executive campus is located in Santa Fe, Mexico City and the main campus is based in Santa Catarina, a municipality of the state of Nuevo León, Mexico. The current director is Leslie García Novak; before her was the university's founder, Alejandro García Villarreal.

== Philosophy ==
CEDIM created a new educational model based on the close relationship between design, innovation, and business. It focused on developing students' capacities in the classroom through real-life projects with different industries.

== Educational Model ==
In the year 2008 CEDIM proposed a different educational model from the rest of the universities in Mexico This model consists of three phases that are:

"Discovery" - In the discovery phase, students from all disciplines converge. They discover the importance of creativity and innovation from human, historical, and business perspectives, and develop basic drawing and software skills.

"Development" - In the development phase, students deepen their grasp of their specialities to gain a practical understanding of their subject matter, and its application in the professional world.

"Consolidation" - During the final years students from all majors work together. This allows students to gain multidisciplinary experiences. They experiment and propose projects with real clients, and thus have professional practice before graduation.

== History ==
CEDIM was one of the pioneers in field of art and design in Mexico. It was founded in 1978 by Alejandro García, who had the vision to create alternatives for study in his country. At the time it was called the Monterrey Center for the Study of Design (Spanish: Centro de Estudios de Diseño de Monterrey), and offered technical degrees in specialities like Interior Design and Visual Marketing. Its humble beginnings took place in a small house on Vallarta Street, which consisted of an office and two classrooms.

Since then CEDIM has occupied various campuses:

In 1979, a year after its foundation, and because of the space limitations of the house it occupied, it moved to a larger house in the Purísima Plaza. The rooms of this house were re-purposed for classrooms and workshops. Student projects and works were first presented here.

In 1982, demand for technical careers began to rise, to a degree that it was necessary to move again, this time to the Obispado neighborhood, on Padre Mier Street, to an old house that was owned at the time by the Clariond family.

In 1985, CEDIM began to offer not only technical degrees, but bachelor's degrees. From this time forward, CEDIM began to build international relationships with institutions such as the F.I.T. in New York City.

Its founder, Alejandro García, died in 1989, leaving as a legacy an institution that has now graduated 50 generations of professionals, and has been an agent of change and a cultural motor for Monterrey.

In the 1990s, CEDIM hosted many exhibitions of local artis, and expos of its most talented students. The conferences and art installation continue in the new campus to this day.

In January 2008 the CEDIM moved to a new campus, and a new educational model, based on significant learning experiences. The entire curriculum was redesigned, and the faculty system was changed.

As of 2011, the CEDIM imparts eight undergraduate degrees and a master's degree in Business Innovation. The undergraduate degrees are Animation, Fashion Design, Graphic Design, Product Design, Digital Arts, Marketing, and Architecture.
