= Rob Globke =

American ice hockey player (born 1982)

- Born: October 24, 1982 (age 43) Farmington, Michigan, US
- Height: 6 ft 2 in (188 cm)
- Weight: 200 lb (91 kg; 14 st 4 lb)
- Position: Right wing
- Shot: Left
- Played for: Florida Panthers; Frederikshavn White Hawks; Krefeld Pinguine; Sheffield Steelers
- National team: United States
- NHL draft: 40th overall, 2002; Florida Panthers
- Playing career: 2006–2011

Robert Frederick Globke (born October 24, 1982) is an American former professional ice hockey player.

== Biography ==
Globke was born in Farmington, Michigan, but grew up in West Bloomfield Township, Michigan. As a youth, he played in the 1996 Quebec International Pee-Wee Hockey Tournament with the Detroit Compuware minor ice hockey team.

Globke graduated from the University of Notre Dame and from Southfield Christian School. He was named as an All-Central Collegiate Hockey Association second team all-star in the 2003–04 season.

Globke played in the National Hockey League with the Florida Panthers with whom he was drafted 40th overall in the 2002 NHL entry draft. He last played for the Sheffield Steelers of the Elite Ice Hockey League.

== Career statistics ==
=== Regular season and playoffs ===
			Regular season					Playoffs
Season	Team	League	GP	G	A	Pts	PIM	GP	G	A	Pts	PIM
1998–99	Detroit Compuware	NAHL	55	8	14	22	111	7	1	2	3	2
1999–2000	US NTDP Juniors	USHL	54	15	21	36	68	—	—	—	—	—
2000–01	University of Notre Dame	CCHA	33	17	9	26	74	—	—	—	—	—
2001–02	University of Notre Dame	CCHA	33	11	11	22	79	—	—	—	—	—
2002–03	University of Notre Dame	CCHA	40	21	15	36	44	—	—	—	—	—
2003–04	University of Notre Dame	CCHA	39	19	21	40	42	—	—	—	—	—
2004–05	San Antonio Rampage	AHL	63	6	6	12	21	—	—	—	—	—
2004–05	Texas Wildcatters	ECHL	10	8	4	12	13	—	—	—	—	—
2005–06	Rochester Americans	AHL	52	6	9	15	54	—	—	—	—	—
2005–06	Florida Panthers	NHL	18	1	0	1	6	—	—	—	—	—
2006–07	Rochester Americans	AHL	48	7	11	18	37	4	0	0	0	0
2006–07	Florida Panthers	NHL	19	0	1	1	0	—	—	—	—	—
2007–08	Rochester Americans	AHL	64	9	12	21	42	—	—	—	—	—
2007–08	Florida Panthers	NHL	9	0	0	0	2	—	—	—	—	—
2008–09	Frederikshavn White Hawks	DEN	28	11	11	22	92	7	3	1	4	16
2009–10	Krefeld Pinguine	DEL	48	5	7	12	46	—	—	—	—	—
2010–11	Sheffield Steelers	EIHL	46	18	32	50	52	3	1	1	2	2
AHL totals			227	28	38	66	154	4	0	0	0	0
NHL totals			46	1	1	2	8	—	—	—	—	—

=== International ===
Year	Team	Event	Result	GP	G	A	Pts	PIM
2000	United States	WJC18	8th	6	4	2	6	6
2001	United States	WJC	5th	7	2	0	2	8
2002	United States	WJC	5th	7	2	1	3	4
Junior totals				20	8	3	11	18
