= Hollywood, Portland, Oregon =

Neighborhood in Portland, Oregon, U.S.

Hollywood
- Neighborhood
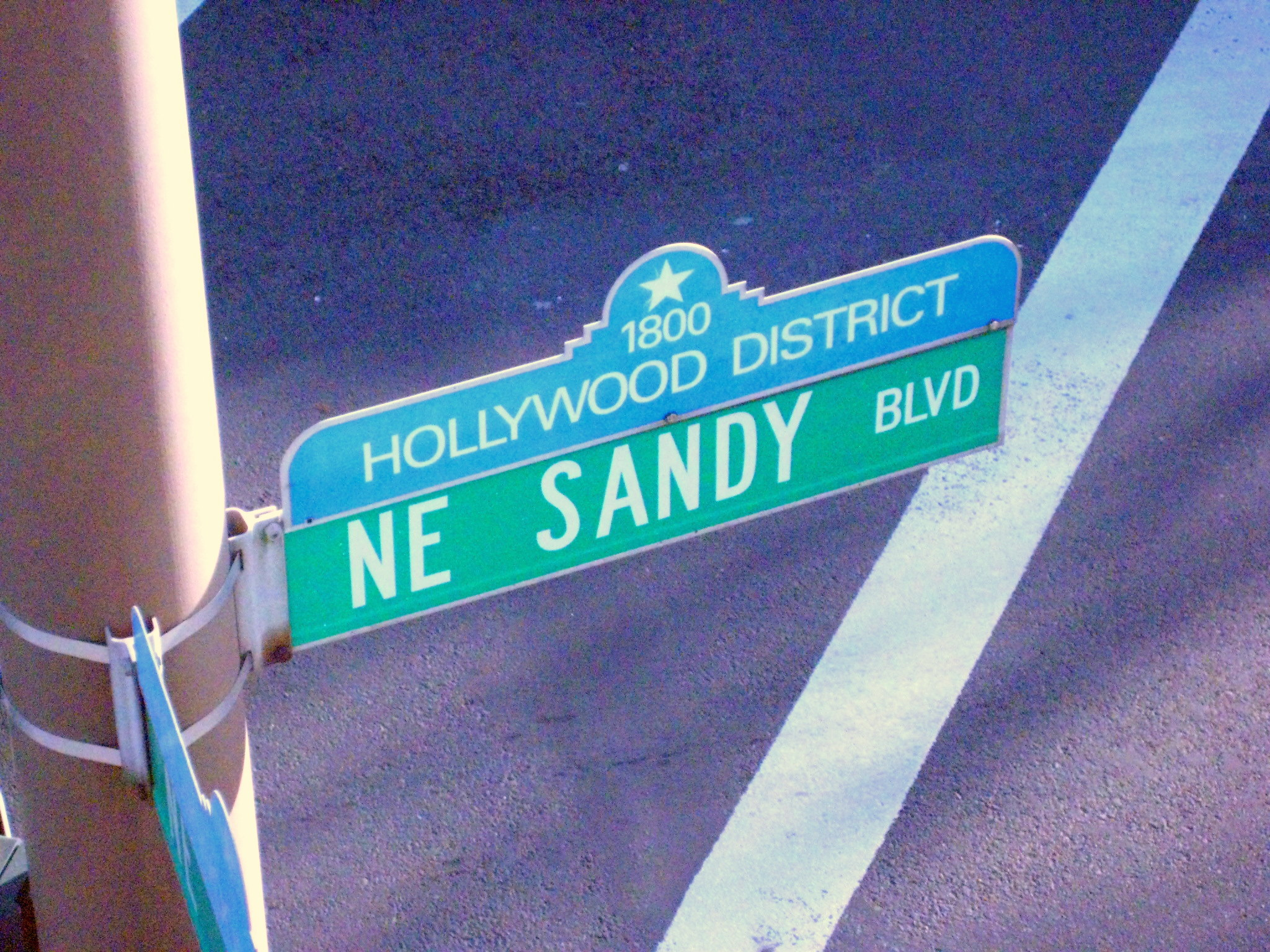
- Interactive map of Hollywood
- Coordinates: 45°32′08″N 122°37′13″W
- Country: United States
- State: Oregon
- City: Portland

Government
  - Association: Hollywood Neighborhood Association
  - Coalition: Central Northeast Neighbors, Inc.

Area
  - Total: 0.1797 sq mi (0.4654 km^{2})

Population (2000)
  - Total: 1,061
  - Density: 5,905/sq mi (2,280/km^{2})

Housing
  - No. of households: 758
  - Occupancy rate: 96% occupied
  - Owner-occupied: 115 households (15%)
  - Renting: 643 households (85%)
  - Avg. household size: 1.4 persons

The Hollywood District (originally Hollyrood, after the Scottish Holyrood) is a neighborhood of northeast Portland, Oregon, United States renamed for its historic 1920s-era Hollywood Theatre.

== Neighborhood ==
Although a mixed commercial and residential area, Hollywood serves primarily as a shopping district to the adjacent neighborhoods of Grant Park and Laurelhurst, as well as to riders of the MAX Light Rail System. The Hollywood District also figures in Beverly Cleary's Klickitat Street series of books, a fact memorialized in a display at the Hollywood Library, which also provides a Beverly Cleary walking tour. The first pedestrian crossing light in Oregon was installed in the Hollywood District, across the street from the Hollywood theater.

== History ==
=== Indigenous presence ===
Prior to European-American settlement, the land that is now the Hollywood District was inhabited by Chinookan peoples, including the Multnomah and Clackamas tribes. A Native trail that followed the approximate path of today's NE Sandy Boulevard served as a seasonal travel and trade route for Indigenous communities.

=== Early settlement ===
Following the Oregon Treaty of 1846, the area became part of the Oregon Territory and was made available to settlers through the Donation Land Claim Act of 1850. In 1866, a 640-acre tract encompassing what is now the Hollywood District was granted to the widow of pioneer Joseph Backenstos.

By the 1890s, maps referred to the area as the "Crook Tract," and it remained mostly undeveloped farmland until the early 20th century.

=== Streetcar development and "Hollyrood" ===
In 1906, the Rose City streetcar line was extended along Sandy Road (now NE Sandy Boulevard), connecting the area to downtown Portland and spurring residential growth. The land was platted into the Rose City Park subdivision in 1907, and the neighborhood became known as "Hollyrood," a nod to Holyrood Palace in Scotland.

=== Hollywood Theatre and renaming ===
The district received its current name after the opening of the Hollywood Theatre on July 17, 1926. Designed in the Spanish Colonial Revival style by architects John V. Bennes and Harry Herzog, the theater seated 1,500 and quickly became a landmark. The neighborhood adopted the "Hollywood" name soon after.

=== Business and community growth ===
The district’s commercial corridor flourished from the 1920s onward. Paulsen’s Pharmacy, established in 1918, remains in operation at its original location, complete with a 1920s-era soda fountain.

In 1931, a Fred Meyer store opened in Hollywood, offering off-street parking and gas service. It was later replaced in 1947 by a larger store featuring one of Oregon’s first rooftop parking lots.

The Hollywood Boosters Business Association was founded in 1934 and remains Portland’s oldest such group. The organization played a major role in launching community events and supporting local commerce.

The now-defunct Rodgers store chain had its headquarters (as well as its largest store) in the Hollywood District from 1955 to 1984.

The Hollywood Boosters started "Hollywood at Night" in summer of 2006. This was a monthly neighborhood event that takes place on the third Thursday of every month to bring together residents and local businesses.

=== Community traditions ===
Hollywood is home to the Junior Rose Festival Parade, which became an official event in 1936 but traces its roots to a 1918 children’s parade organized after World War I canceled the main Rose Festival parade. The Junior Parade is now considered the oldest and largest children's parade in the country.

Since the 1950s, the district has also hosted the annual Veterans Day Parade, supported by local organizations such as the Hollywood Boosters and the Portland Hollywood Lions Club.

=== Preservation and revitalization ===
In 1983, the Hollywood Theatre was added to the National Register of Historic Places, helping preserve the building during a period of urban decline. In the late 1990s, the nonprofit Film Action Oregon purchased the theater and restored it to its former glory.

The Hollywood/NE 42nd Avenue Transit Center opened in 1986 as part of the MAX Light Rail system. A large vintage-style "HOLLYWOOD" marquee was added near the station entrance, funded by local donations.

The neighborhood continues to balance historical preservation with new development, including mixed-use buildings and a thriving farmers market founded in 1997.]

== Organizations ==
The oldest neighborhood business district association in Portland, the Hollywood Boosters still continues its mission today—in supporting the local businesses.

The Hollywood Star News was founded in the neighborhood, and remains a local favorite newspaper for residents living in North & Northeast Portland.

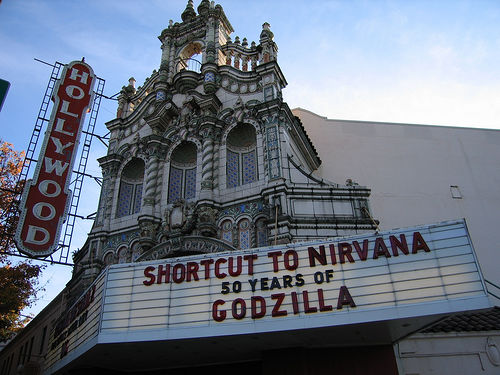
Hollywood Theatre

Hollywood Farmers Market is a year-round Saturday farmers' market located on NE Hancock Street between 44th and 45th Avenues, which runs weekly from April through November, and twice-monthly from December through March. It's one of the largest on the east side of Portland.

Portland Fashion Institute is located in the Hollywood District. Founded in 2010, PFI focuses on design, technology and business connected to the fashion industry and is Oregon’s only accredited fashion design school.

== Notable landmarks ==
- Hollywood Theatre (Portland, Oregon)
- Hollywood Library (Multnomah County Library system)
- Paulsen’s Pharmacy
- Hollywood/NE 42nd Avenue MAX Station

== See also ==
- Hollywood Boosters Business Association
- Neighborhoods of Portland, Oregon
- Streetcar suburbs
