= 1998 New York State Comptroller election =

- November 3, 1998
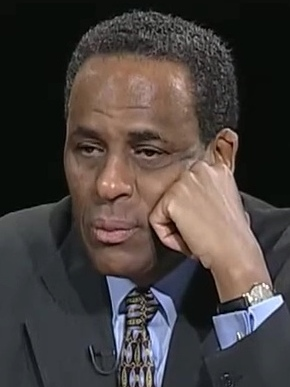

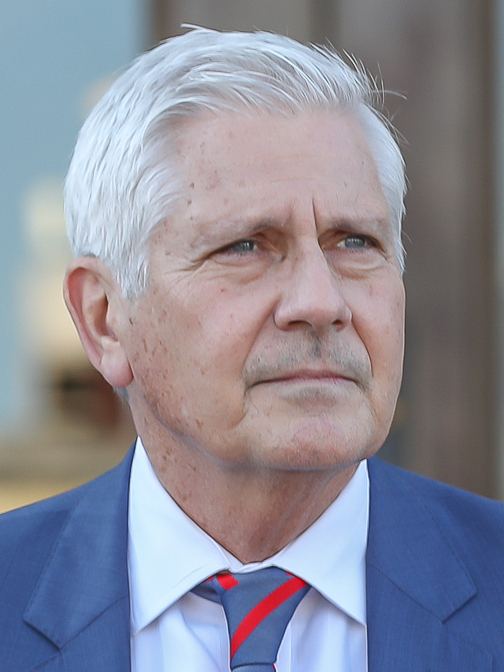
Candidate	Carl McCall	Bruce Blakeman
Party	Democratic	Republican
Popular vote	2,862,903	1,423,086
Percentage	64.75%	32.19%
- County results McCall: 40–50% 50–60% 70–80% 80–90% Blakeman: 40–50% 50–60%
Comptroller before election
Carl McCall
Democratic
Elected Comptroller
Carl McCall
Democratic

The 1998 New York State Comptroller election was held on November 3, 1998. Democratic incumbent Carl McCall defeated Republican challenger Bruce Blakeman by a wide margin.

== General election ==
=== Polling ===
Source	Date	Carl McCall (D)	Bruce Blakeman (R)
Quinnipiac	September 27, 1998	54%	22%
Quinnipiac	October 15, 1998	52%	21%
Quinnipiac	October 28, 1998	57%	20%

=== Results ===
General election results
Party	Candidate	Votes	%
Democratic	Carl McCall	2,634,766	
Working Families (Independence)	Carl McCall	168,263	
Liberal	Carl McCall	59,874	
Total	Carl McCall (incumbent)	2,862,903	64.75
Republican	Bruce Blakeman	1,203,538	
Conservative	Bruce Blakeman	219,548	
Total	Bruce Blakeman	1,423,086	32.19
Right to Life	Douglas H. Harknett	70,397	1.59
Marijuana Reform	Dean Venezia	39,423	0.89
Green	Howie Hawkins	15,133	0.34
Libertarian	Robert M. Goodman	10,310	0.23
Total votes		4,421,252	100.00
Democratic hold			

== See also ==
Preceded by 1994	New York Comptroller election 1998	Succeeded by 2002
