= Portland Fashion Institute =

Fashion school in Portland, Oregon

Coordinates: 45°32′17″N 122°37′07″W

- Type: Private, nonprofit higher education career institute
- Established: 2010; 16 years ago
- Founders: Sharon K Blair
- Students: 865 enrolled & non-enrollees (2020–2021)
- Location: Portland, Oregon, United States
- Nickname: PFI
- Website: www.pfi.edu

The Portland Fashion Institute (PFI) is a private, nonprofit nationally accredited career institute of higher learning located in Portland, Oregon. It focuses on design, technology and business connected to the fashion industry. It was founded in 2010. It is Oregon's only accredited fashion design school.

== Academics ==
PFI is licensed by Oregon's Higher Education Coordinating Commission and accredited by the Accrediting Council for Continuing Education and Training, because the school's teaching and programs meet rigorous educational standards. A five-member advisory board designs and refines PFI's curriculum and includes representatives from Adidas, Columbia Sportswear, Nike, Shibui Knits and VFC. All instructors are professionals who currently work in the apparel industry.

PFI offers three certificate programs: Apparel Designer, Apparel Technical Developer and Apparel Entrepreneur. Apparel Design focuses on skills to start a line of clothing or work at a large apparel company. Apparel Technical Developer focuses on computer skills in Adobe and patternmaking so enrollees can work as a technical designer, materials, print or product developer, patternmaker or fit engineer. Apparel Entrepreneur teaches the skills required to build a business plan, understand the nuance of fashion buying and merchandising for wholesale, retail and e-commerce.

In addition to the certificate programs, registrants can take every course offered by PFI as non-credit or continuing education. Among the most popular series are Apparel Construction and Patternmaking where students start with the basics and move up to advanced digital design.

An annual scholarship is offered to high school juniors and seniors with exceptional promise in fashion design. PFI has won diversity and business grants through its federal, state and local partners. Unlike some for-profit schools, PFI remains affordable. It believes in #schoolwithoutdebt with the cost of a certificate ranging from $16,000 to $19,000.

More than 7,000 persons have studied at the school since it opened its doors.

In 2023, PFI became a nonprofit 501(c)(3) EIN 36-5051224.

== Campus ==
PFI's campus in the Hollywood District of northeast Portland. Facilities include computers with 2D and 3D programs, a video and photography studio, workrooms, industrial sewing machines, and a design space. Half of the classes are offered online through synchronous interactive distance learning. These include lecture and computer classes. Hands-on classes are taught in-person. Through its library, enrollees have access to books, periodicals and media for every aspect of fashion design and the apparel business. Apartments and extended stay hotels are within walking distance of PFI, along with public transportation, grocery stores, restaurants, a county library, health services and entertainment.

=== PFI Supply ===
The campus includes PFI Supply which offers tools, supplies and materials for students and the general public.

== Alumni ==
Enrollees have graduated to work at apparel manufacturers across the United States and in Europe. Some have started their own clothing companies. Graduates show collections at annual industry events that attract buyers, press and managers from top area apparel companies. PFI collaborates with industry, companies and community leaders on projects, competitions and exhibits. Participants walk through all steps of apparel production and marketing, including fashion styling and a photo shoot. PFI hosts career and portfolio shows.

Alumni have found jobs at adidas, Blue Ivy, Bridge & Burn, Browzwear, Columbia Sportswear, Duchess Clothiers, Jantzen/Perry Ellis, Michael Curry Designs, Nike, Pendleton, Phillips-Van Heusen Corporation, The North Face, UnderArmour, Yeezy and several other apparel companies and production houses.
