= 2002 New York gubernatorial election =

- November 5, 2002
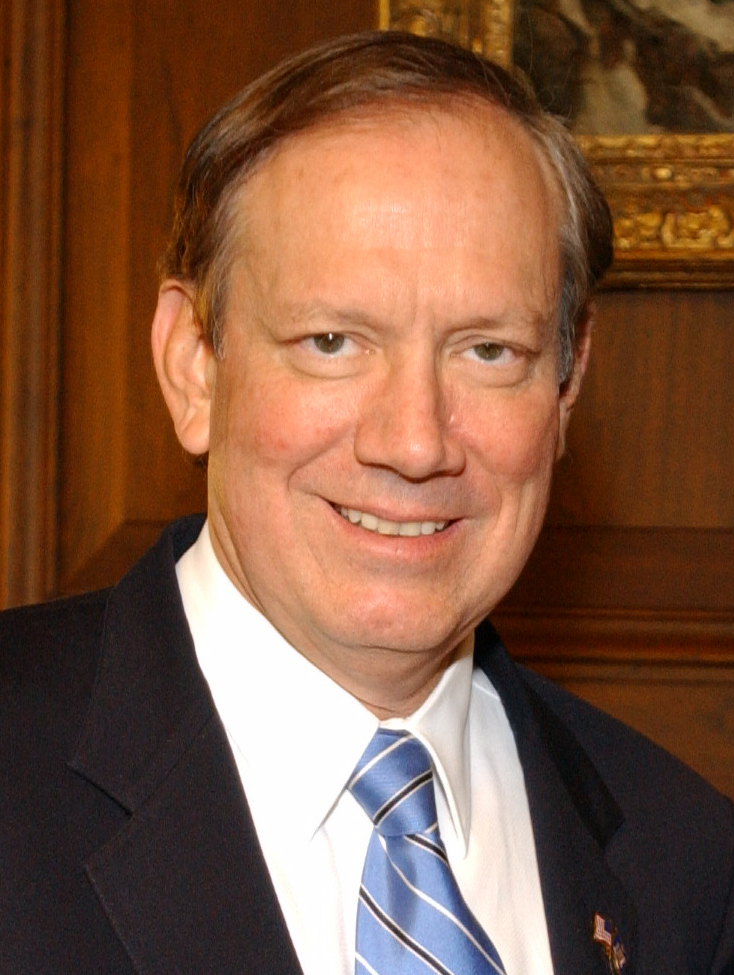

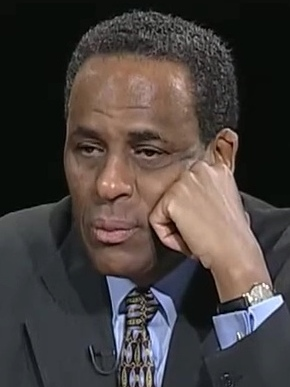

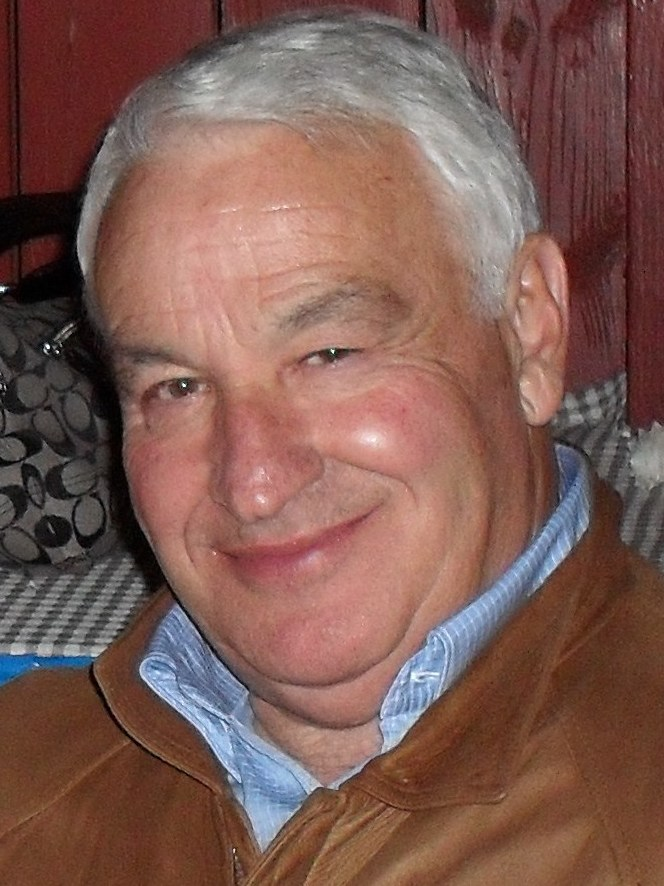
Nominee	George Pataki	H. Carl McCall	Tom Golisano
Party	Republican	Democratic	Independence
Alliance	Conservative	Working Families
Running mate	Mary Donohue	Dennis Mehiel	Mary Donohue (Note: Jointly nominated by the GOP and Independence parties)
Popular vote	2,262,255	1,534,064	654,016
Percentage	49.40%	33.50%	14.28%
- County results Pataki: 40–50% 50–60% 60–70% 70–80% McCall: 40–50% 50–60% 60–70% Golisano: 30–40%
Governor before election
George Pataki
Republican
Elected Governor
George Pataki
Republican

The 2002 New York gubernatorial election was held on November 5, 2002 to elect the governor and lieutenant governor of New York. Republican incumbent George Pataki was re-elected to a third term with 49.4 percent of the vote over state comptroller Carl McCall and businessman Tom Golisano. McCall carried New York City but performed poorly in upstate New York. Golisano received 14.3 percent of the vote, carrying his home county of Monroe and finishing ahead of McCall in 23 counties.

As of 2026, this was the last time a Republican won any statewide election in New York, and this is the last time a Republican carried Westchester, Albany, Onondaga, and Tompkins counties in a gubernatorial election. This is also the longest drought nationally for the Republican Party to win in a statewide office. This was the first time since 1978 that the winner of the gubernatorial election was of the same party as the incumbent president.

== Republican primary ==
=== Candidates ===
- George Pataki, Governor of New York since 1995

==== Declined ====
- Rudy Giuliani, former mayor of New York City (1994–2001)

=== Results ===
Pataki won the Republican nomination unopposed.

== Democratic primary ==
=== Candidates ===
- H. Carl McCall, New York state comptroller

==== Withdrew ====
- Andrew Cuomo, former U.S. secretary of housing and urban development and son of former governor Mario Cuomo

=== Campaign ===
Comptroller Carl McCall defeated Andrew Cuomo at the Democratic state convention, and Cuomo withdrew from the race less than a week before the Democratic primary.

=== Debate ===
2002 New York gubernatorial election democratic primary debate
No.	Date	Host	Moderator	Link	Democratic	Democratic
Key: P Participant A Absent N Not invited I Invited W Withdrawn						
Key: P Participant A Absent N Not invited I Invited W Withdrawn					Andrew Cuomo	Carl McCall
1	Aug. 18, 2002	WCBS-TV	Marcia Kramer	C-SPAN	P	P

=== Results ===
Results by county: McCall: 70–80%; 80–90%; 90–100%

2002 New York Democratic gubernatorial primary
Party	Candidate	Votes	%
Democratic	Carl McCall	539,883	85.28%
Democratic	Andrew Cuomo (withdrew)	93,195	14.72%
Total votes		633,088	100.00%

== Other nominations ==
=== Conservative and Independence ===
Independence primary results by county: Pataki: 50–60%; 60–70%; 70–80%; 80–90%; 90–100%; Golisano: 50–60%; 60–70%; 70–80%; 80–90%; 90–100%; Tie: 50%

Conservative primary results by county: Pataki: 50–60%; 60–70%; 70–80%; 80–90%; 90–100%; Golisano: 50–60%

Besides his standard Republican nomination, Pataki sought the nominations of the Conservative Party and the Independence Party. Golisano, who sought (and ultimately won) the nomination of the Independence Party, also ran against the Governor in the Conservative primary as a write-in candidate. Pataki secured the Conservative line.

Candidate	Conservative vote	percentage	Independence vote	percentage
George Pataki	18,185	(86.86%)	9,026	(48.53%)
Tom Golisano	2,751	(13.14%)	9,572	(51.47%)

=== Liberal ===
Andrew Cuomo was nominated by the Liberal Party before his withdrawal from the race, and his withdrawal came too late for his name to be removed from the Liberal Party line.

== General election ==
=== Candidates ===
- Stanley Aronowitz, CUNY Graduate Center professor of sociology and urban education (Green)
  - Running mate: Jennifer Daniels, Syracuse physician and social activist
- Gerard Cronin, St. Francis Preparatory School social studies and history teacher (Right to Life)
  - Running mate: Stasia T. Vogel, former Evans town prosecutor
- Tom Golisano, CEO of Paychex and 1994 and 1998 nominee for governor (Independence)
  - Running mate: Mary Donohue, incumbent lieutenant governor since 1999 (also running as Republican)
- Scott Jeffrey, activist and director of internet radio for MTV Networks (Libertarian)
  - Running mate: Jay Greco, intellectual property and startup attorney
- Thomas Leighton, 1998 nominee for governor (Marijuana Reform)
  - Running mate: Thomas J. Hillgardner, Jamaica, Queens tenant advocate and lawyer
- H. Carl McCall, New York state comptroller (Democratic, Working Families)
  - Running mate: Dennis Mehiel, chairman, CEO, and owner of Box USA
- George Pataki, incumbent governor since 1995 (Republican, Conservative)
  - Running mate: Mary Donohue, incumbent lieutenant governor since 1999 (also running as Independence)

==== Withdrew ====
- Andrew Cuomo, former U.S. secretary of housing and urban development and son of former governor Mario Cuomo (Liberal)
  - Running mate: Charlie King, attorney, housing advocate, and former regional administrator for the U.S. Department of Housing and Urban Development

=== Predictions ===
Source	Ranking	As of
The Cook Political Report	Likely R	October 31, 2002
Sabato's Crystal Ball	Likely R	November 4, 2002

=== Polling ===
Poll source	Date(s) administered	Sample size (Note: Key: A – all adults RV – registered voters LV – likely voters V – unclear)	Margin of error	George Pataki (R)	Carl McCall (D)	Tom Golisano (I)	Gerald Cronin (RTL)	Other / Undecided
SurveyUSA	October 28–30, 2002	567 (LV)	± 4.3%	47%	32%	17%	2%	1%

=== Debate ===
2002 New York gubernatorial debate
No.	Date	Host	Moderator	Link	Republican	Democratic	Independence	Right to Life	Independent	Green	Libertarian
Key: P Participant A Absent N Not invited I Invited W Withdrawn											
Key: P Participant A Absent N Not invited I Invited W Withdrawn					George Pataki	Carl McCall	Tom Golisano	Gerard Cronin	Thomas Leighton	Stanley Aronowitz	Scott Jeffrey
1	Oct. 20, 2002	WTVH-TV	Maureen Green; Matt Mulcahy	C-SPAN	P	P	P	A	P	P	P

=== Results ===

New York gubernatorial election, 2002
Party	Candidate	Votes	%	±%
Republican	George Pataki	2,085,407	45.54%	−0.05
Conservative	George Pataki	176,848	3.86%	−3.16
Total	George Pataki (incumbent)	2,262,255	49.40%	-4.88
Democratic	Carl McCall	1,442,531	31.50%	+1.03
Working Families	Carl McCall	90,533	1.98%	+0.95
Total	Carl McCall	1,534,064	33.50%	+0.34
Independence	Tom Golisano	654,016	14.28%	+6.59
Right to Life	Gerard Cronin	44,195	0.97%	−0.23
Green	Stanley Aronowitz	41,797	0.91%	−0.20
Marijuana Reform	Thomas K. Leighton	21,977	0.48%	−0.04
Liberal	Andrew M. Cuomo (withdrawn)	15,761	0.34%	−1.31
Libertarian	Scott Jeffrey	5,013	0.11%	+0.00
Majority		728,191	15.90%	−5.25%
Turnout		4,579,078		
Republican hold		Swing		

==== New York City results ====
2002 gubernatorial election in New York City		Manhattan	The Bronx	Brooklyn	Queens	Staten Island	Total	
Democratic	Carl McCall	202,101	121,050	230,040	160,746	18,239	732,136	53.7%
Democratic	Carl McCall	57.2%	63.7%	57.7%	46.5%	20.9%	732,136	53.7%
Republican	George Pataki	117,863	58,600	141,846	155,599	59,656	533,564	39.1%
Republican	George Pataki	33.4%	30.8%	35.6%	45.0%	68.4%	533,564	39.1%

==== Results by county ====
County	George Pataki Republican		Carl McCall Democratic		Tom Golisano Independence		All others		Margin		Total votes cast
County	#	%	#	%	#	%	#	%	#	%	Total votes cast
Albany	45,804	40.9%	45,748	40.9%	17,101	15.3%	3,291	2.9%	56	0.0%	111,944
Allegany	8,134	61.3%	2,042	15.4%	2.683	20.2%	413	3.1%	5,451	41.1% (Note: Compares margin over Golisano.)	13,272
Bronx	58,600	30.8%	121,050	63.7%	7,893	4.2%	2,431	1.2%	-62,450	-32.9%	189,974
Broome	32,399	50.2%	12,956	20.1%	17,478	27.1%	1,721	2.7%	14,921	23.1%	64,554
Cattaraugus	12,400	57.2%	4,302	19.8%	4,287	19.8%	684	3.1%	8,098	37.4%	21,673
Cayuga	14,203	57.0%	5,417	21.8%	4,593	18.4%	689	2.8%	8,786	35.2%	24,902
Chautauqua	22,869	60.5%	8,323	22.0%	5,747	15.2%	871	2.3%	14,546	38.5%	37,810
Chemung	16,398	64.1%	4,619	18.0%	4,018	15.7%	565	2.2%	11,779	46.1%	25,600
Chenango	8,676	60.8%	2,529	17.7%	2,597	18.2%	477	3.3%	6,079	42.6%	14,279
Clinton	17,113	75.3%	3,505	15.4%	1,550	6.8%	544	2.4%	13,608	49.9%	22,712
Columbia	11,995	53.3%	6,454	28.7%	3,091	13.7%	960	4.3%	5,541	24.6%	22,500
Cortland	7,851	55.3%	3,522	24.8%	2,393	16.8%	439	3.1%	4,329	30.5%	14,205
Delaware	9,139	61.3%	2,878	19.3%	2,320	15.6%	575	3.9%	6,261	42.0%	14,912
Dutchess	44,289	58.3%	18,606	24.5%	10,671	14.0%	2,459	3.2%	25,683	33.8%	76,025
Erie	130,377	44.4%	85,360	29.0%	68,702	23.4%	9,527	3.2%	45,017	15.4%	293,966
Essex	10,550	75.9%	1,794	12.9%	1,183	8.5%	380	2.7%	8,756	63.0%	13,907
Franklin	8,628	72.2%	2,009	16.8%	993	8.3%	313	2.6%	6,619	55.4%	11,943
Fulton	9,012	57.3%	3,055	19.4%	3,301	21.0%	367	2.3%	5,711	36.3%	15,735
Genesee	9,588	53.3%	2,553	14.2%	5,402	30.0%	454	2.5%	4,186	23.3%	17,997
Greene	9,363	59.3%	3,281	20.8%	2,625	16.6%	531	3.4%	6,082	38.1%	15,800
Hamilton	1,740	61.1%	550	19.3%	483	17.0%	76	2.6%	1,190	41.8%	2,849
Herkimer	11,834	60.3%	3,178	16.2%	4,140	21.1%	477	2.4%	7,694	39.2%	19,629
Jefferson	17,616	66.8%	3,897	14.8%	4,414	16.7%	433	1.7%	13,202	50.1%	26,360
Kings	141,846	35.6%	230,040	57.7%	16,787	4.2%	9,863	2.5%	-88,194	-22.1%	398,536
Lewis	5,823	65.1%	1,370	15.3%	1,562	17.5%	195	2.2%	4,261	47.6%	8,950
Livingston	8,757	43.8%	3,651	18.3%	7,066	35.4%	512	2.5%	1,691	8.4%	19,986
Madison	10,393	52.8%	4,206	21.4%	4,493	22.8%	591	3.0%	5,900	30.0%	19,683
Monroe	81,110	34.8%	58,334	25.0%	87,967	37.7%	5,788	2.5%	-6,857	-2.9%	233,199
Montgomery	9,285	55.9%	3,346	20.2%	3,573	21.5%	401	2.4%	5,712	34.4%%	16,605
Nassau	232,785	61.5%	99,865	26.4%	35,860	9.5%	10,001	2.7%	132,920	35.1%	378,511
New York	117,863	33.4%	202,101	57.2%	19,743	5.6%	13,385	3.8%	-84,238	-23.8%	353,092
Niagara	32,005	49.2%	12,966	19.9%	18,278	28.1%	1,774	2.7%	13,727	21.1%	65,023
Oneida	40,186	57.4%	13,719	19.6%	14,274	20.4%	1,859	2.6%	25,912	37.0%	70,038
Onondaga	74,694	51.4%	39,110	26.9%	27,459	18.9%	4,042	2.7%	35,584	24.5%	145,305
Ontario	15,480	46.4%	5,512	16.5%	11,478	34.4%	887	2.6%	4,002	12.0%	33,357
Orange	53,950	62.4%	17,866	20.7%	11,914	13.8%	2,661	3.0%	36,084	41.7%	86,391
Orleans	5,426	48.9%	1,568	14.1%	3,869	34.9%	229	2.1%	1,557	14.0%	11,092
Oswego	17,393	54.2%	6,826	21.3%	7,111	22.2%	756	2.4%	10,282	32.0%	32,086
Otsego	9,846	55.9%	4,109	23.3%	2,824	16.0%	844	4.8%	5,737	32.6%	17,623
Putnam	19,998	70.4%	4,284	15.1%	3,217	11.3%	916	3.3%	15,714	55.3%	28,415
Queens	155,599	45.0%	160,746	46.5%	21,556	6.2%	7,817	2.2%	-5,147	-1.5%	345,718
Rensselaer	27,120	50.0%	15,491	28.5%	9,908	18.3%	1,744	3.2%	11,629	21.5%	54,263
Richmond	59,656	68.4%	18,239	20.9%	7,583	8.7%	1,717	1.9%	11,629	47.5%	54,263
Rockland	53,025	62.7%	22,054	26.1%	7,557	8.9%	1,988	2.4%	30,971	36.6%	84,624
Saratoga	38,797	55.2%	16,881	24.0%	12,448	17.7%	2,205	3.1%	21,916	31.2%	70,331
Schenectady	24,201	48.2%	14,378	28.7%	10,116	20.2%	1,483	3.0%	9,823	19.5%	50,178
Schoharie	5,731	54.3%	2,296	21.8%	2,141	20.3%	379	3.5%	3,435	32.5%	10,547
Schuyler	3,535	60.9%	1,043	18.0%	989	17.0%	235	4.1%	2,492	42.9%	5,802
Seneca	5,969	56.8%	1,986	18.9%	2,270	21.6%	291	2.8%	3,699	35.2%	10,516
St. Lawrence	19,635	65.2%	6,234	20.7%	3,621	12.0%	608	2.1%	13,401	44.5%	30,098
Steuben	17,523	63.9%	3,419	12.5%	5,721	20.9%	751	2.8%	11,802	43.0%	27,414
Suffolk	209,361	59.1%	82,776	23.4%	51,288	14.5%	10,783	3.1%	126,585	35.7%	354,208
Sullivan	11,279	56.4%	4,949	24.7%	3,133	15.7%	636	3.2%	6,330	31.7%	19,997
Tioga	9,561	60.3%	2,396	15.1%	3,459	21.8%	428	2.7%	6,102	38.5%	15,844
Tompkins	10,995	40.1%	10,887	39.7%	3,338	12.2%	2,169	7.9%	108	0.4%	27,389
Ulster	29,801	51.9%	15,567	27.1%	9,205	16.0%	2,875	5.0%	14,234	24.8%	57,448
Warren	11,964	58.3%	4,831	23.5%	3,182	15.5%	558	2.7%	7,133	34.8%	20,535
Washington	9,491	56.5%	3,767	22.4%	3,012	17.9%	529	3.2%	5,724	34.1%	16,799
Wayne	12,553	45.6%	4,171	15.1%	10,169	36.9%	642	2.3%	2,384	8.7%	27,535
Westchester	140,329	55.6%	82,099	32.5%	23,113	9.2%	6,897	2.8%	58,230	23.1%	252,438
Wyoming	6,931	54.8%	2,034	16.1%	3,299	26.1%	391	3.1%	3,632	28.7%	12,655
Yates	3,781	53.2%	1,319	18.6%	1,768	24.9%	236	3.4%	2,013	28.3%	7,104
Totals	2,262,255	49.4%	1,534,064	33.5%	654,016	14.3%	128,743	2.8%	728,191	15.9%	4,579,078

Counties that flipped from Republican to Independence

- Monroe (largest city: Rochester)

== Analysis ==
As of 2026, the 2002 was the last time a Republican won any statewide election in New York, and this is the last time a Republican carried Westchester, Albany, Onondaga, and Tompkins counties in a gubernatorial election. This was the first time since 1978 that the winner of the gubernatorial election was of the same party as the incumbent president.

== See also ==
- Governorship of George Pataki
