= Fashion Institute of Technology =

Fashion school of the State University of New York

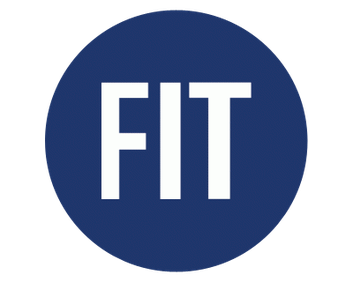
- Former names: Fashion Institute of Technology and Design
- Type: Public community college
- Established: 1944; 82 years ago
- Parent institution: State University of New York
- President: Jason Schupbach
- Students: 8,158 (fall 2025)
- Undergraduates: 7,880 (fall 2025)
- Postgraduates: 278 (fall 2025)
- Location: New York City, United States; 40°44′48″N 73°59′39″W
- Campus: Urban, 1.5 blocks
- Nickname: Tigers
- Mascot: Stitch
- Website: fitnyc.edu

The Fashion Institute of Technology (FIT) is a public college and fashion school under the State University of New York, in New York City. It focuses on art, business, design, mass communication, and technology connected to the fashion industry. It was founded in 1944. FIT is a SUNY community college, and the only community college in NY that offers bachelors and masters degrees (in addition to associate degrees).

== History ==
The Fashion Institute of Technology and Design was founded in 1944 as a two-year technical institute, operated by the New York City Board of Education and Educational Foundation for the Apparel Industry, a group composed of members of management and labor in the garment and fashion industry. The institute operated out of the Central High School of Needle Trades, and tuition was free. In 1951, the institute was named the Fashion Institute of Technology when it became a community college in the State University of New York (SUNY) and began offering associate degrees. Mortimer C. Ritter, who ran the institute since its founding, become the college's first president. It was the first public community college in New York City, and the second in the SUNY system.

In 1967, FIT faculty and staff won the first higher education union contract in New York State. In the 1970s, FIT received permission from the state legislature to grant bachelor's and master's degrees. As a New York State community college, county governments contribute to the tuition costs of residents of those counties attending the school.

In June 1998 Joyce F. Brown became the first woman and the first African American president of the school, and she remained president for 27.5 years, stepping down in December 2025.

== Academics ==
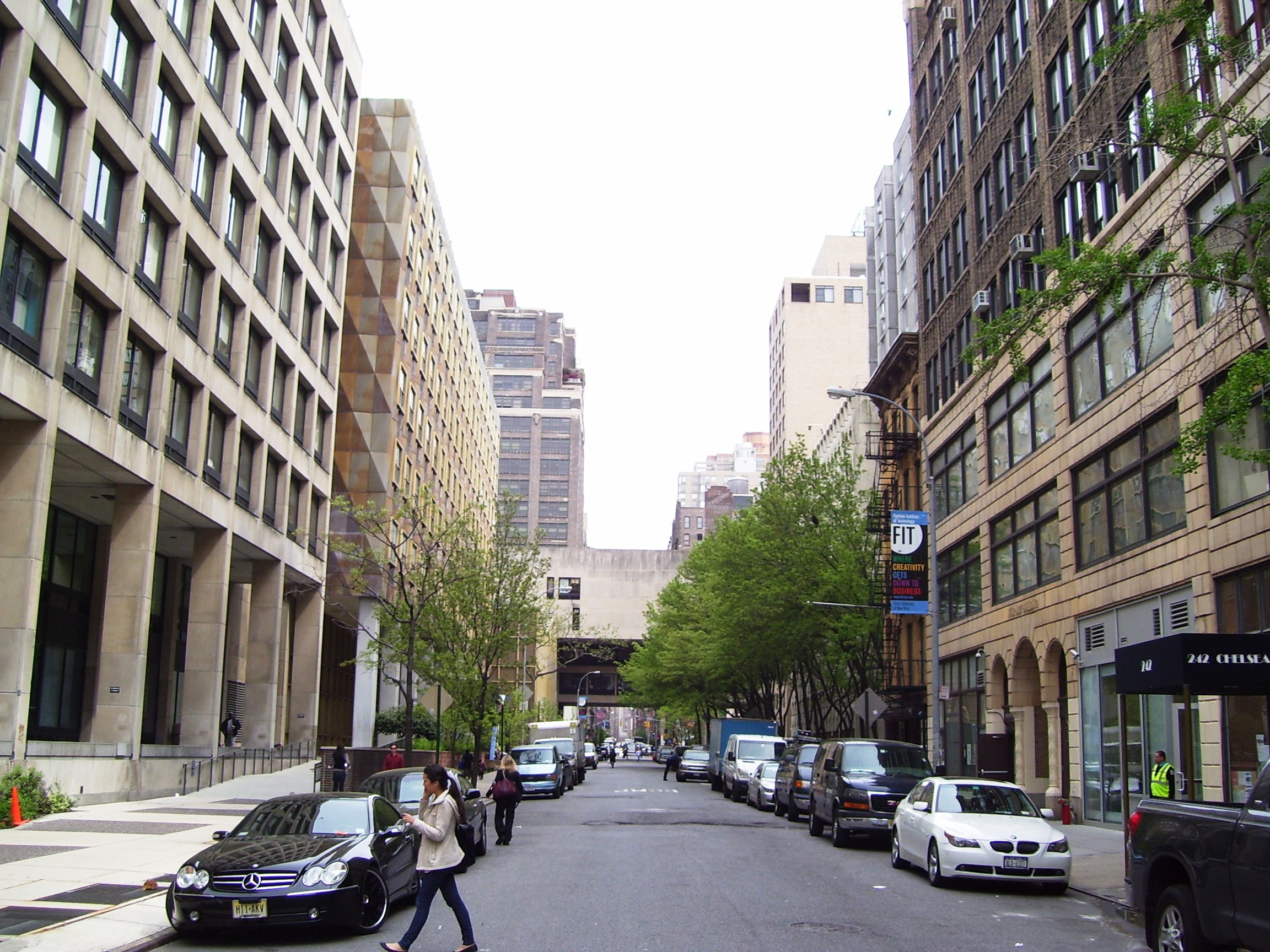
The 27th Street campus of the Fashion Institute of Technology

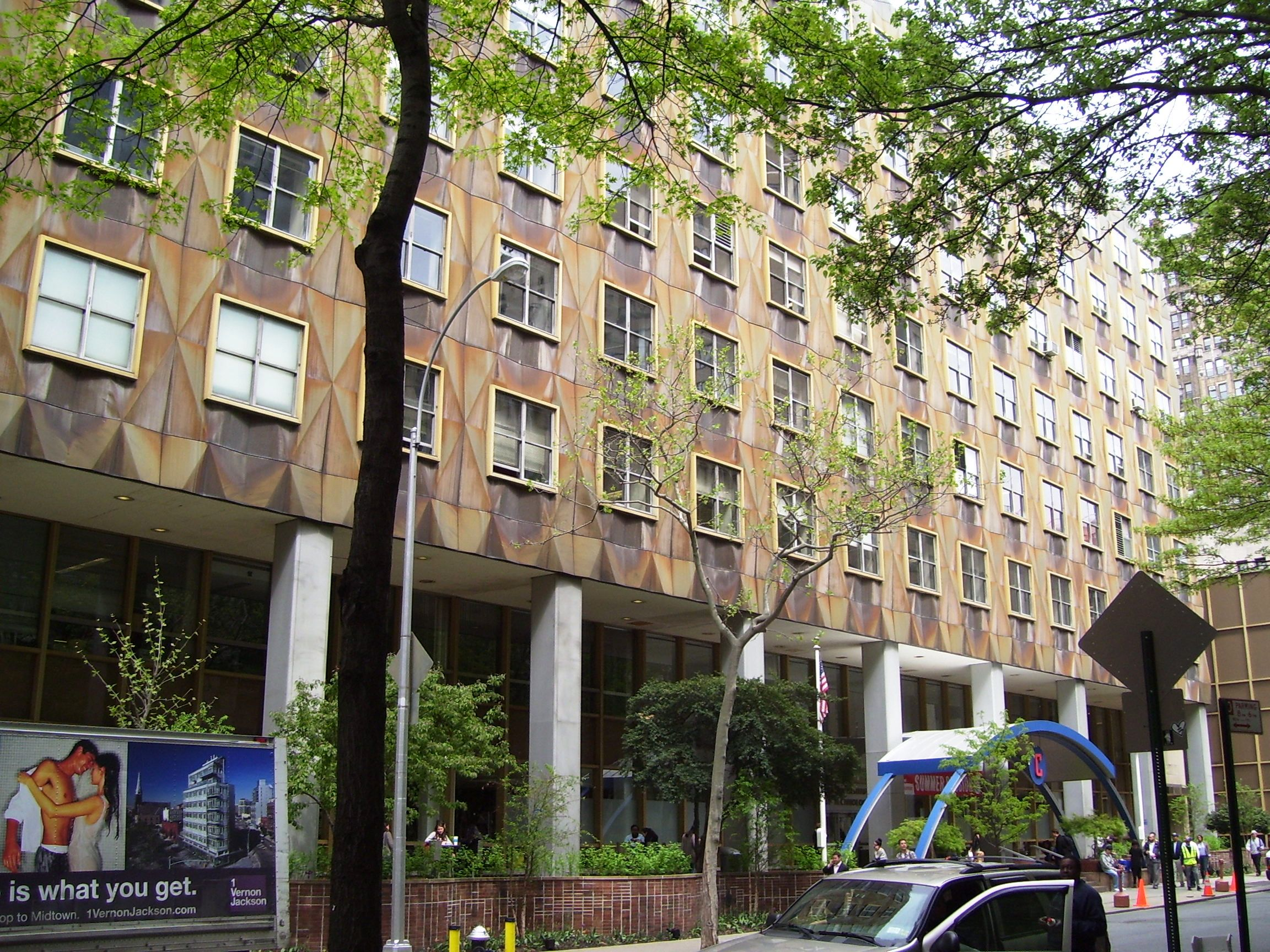
The Marvin Feldman Center

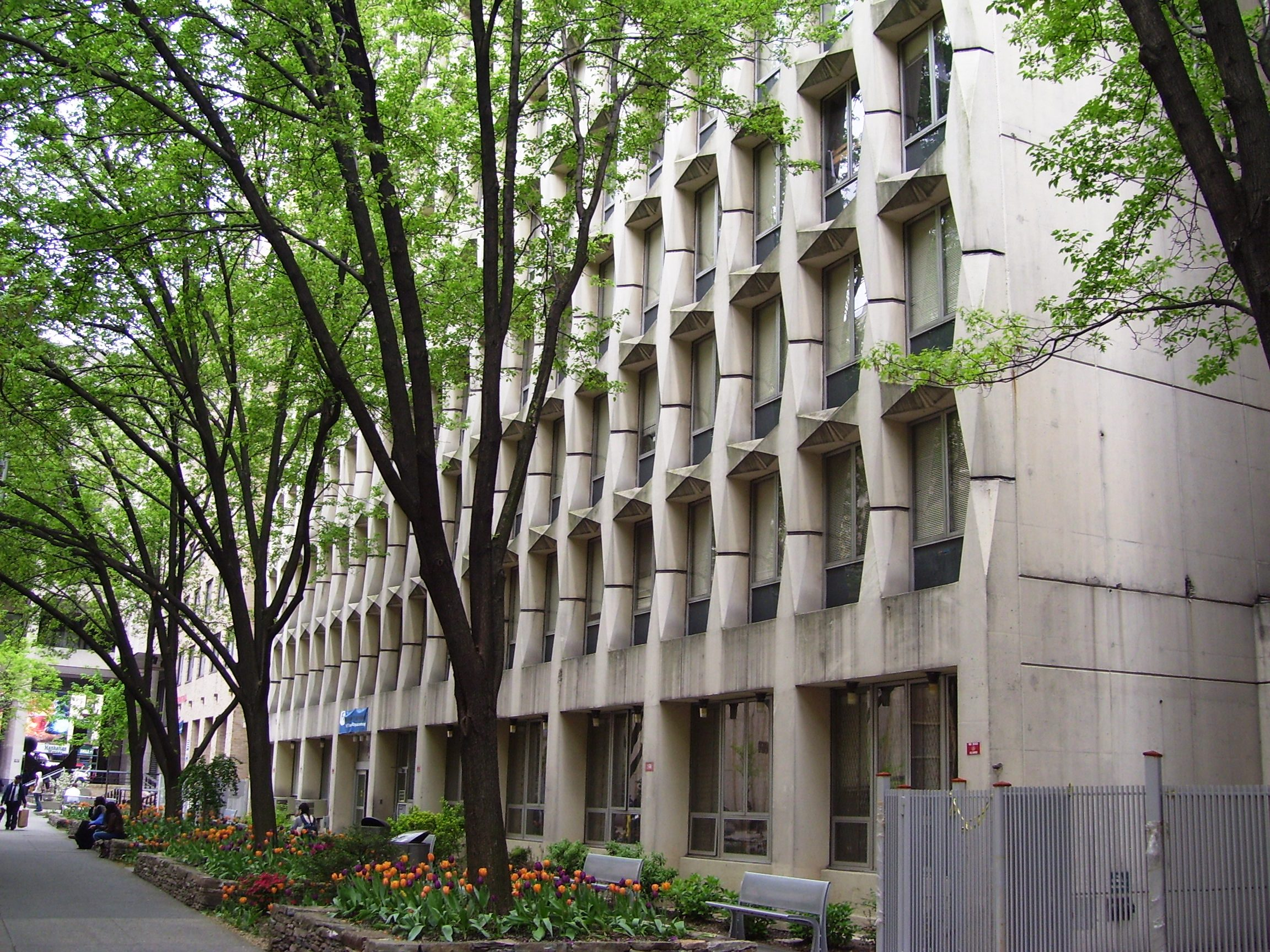
Nagler Hall dormitory

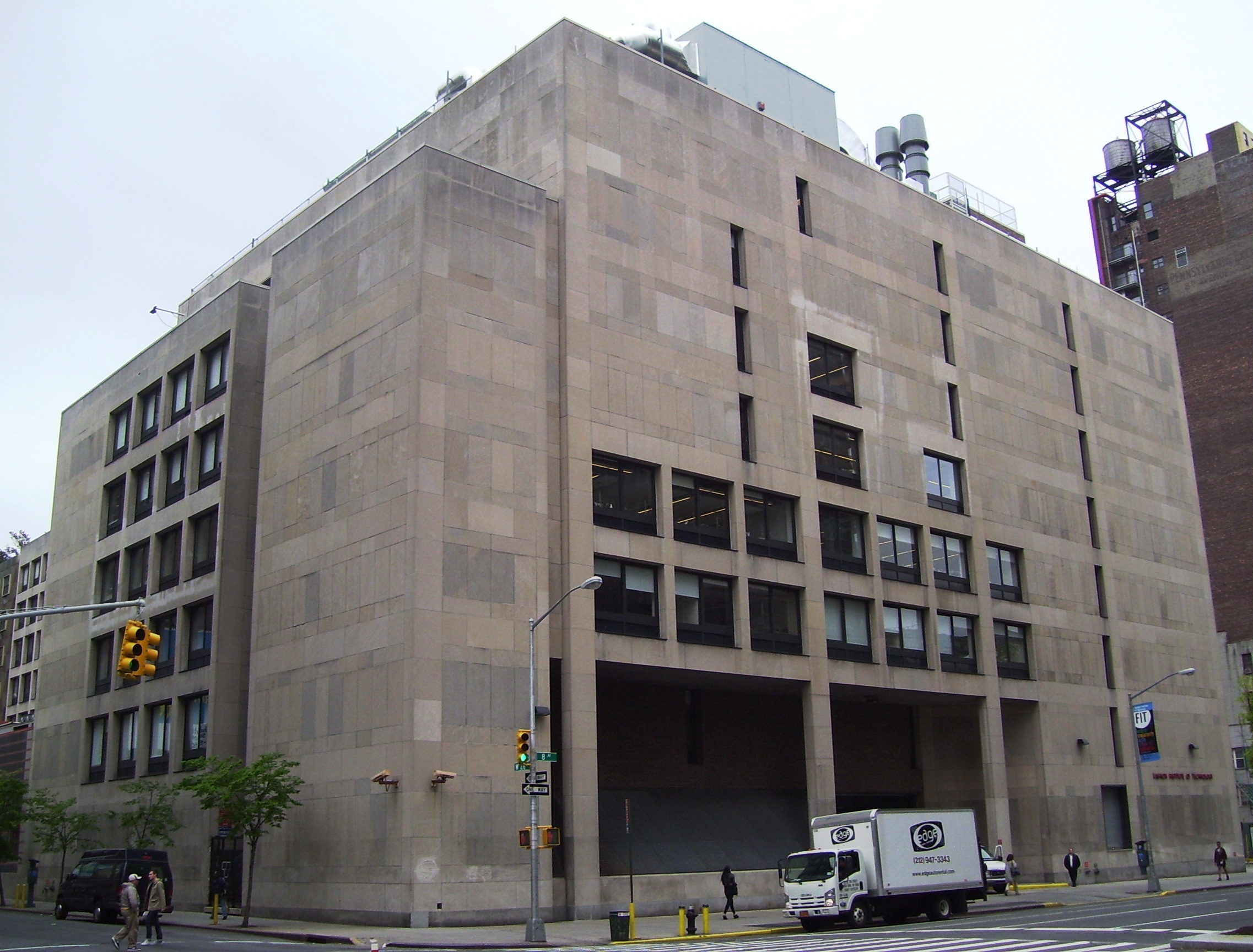
The David Dubinsky Student Center

Seventeen majors are offered through the School of Art and Design, and ten through the Jay and Patty Baker School of Business and Technology leading to degrees of Associate of Applied Science, Bachelor of Fine Arts, or Bachelor of Science. The School of Liberal Arts offers a degree program of Bachelor of Science in art history and museum professions and a degree program of Bachelor of Science in film and media. The School of Graduate Studies offers seven programs leading to degrees of Master of Arts, Master of Fine Arts, or Master of Professional Studies.

In addition to the degree programs, FIT offers a wide selection of non-credit courses through the Center for Professional Studies. One of the most popular programs is the "Sew Like a Pro" series, which teaches basic through advanced sewing skills.

FIT is an accredited institutional member of the Middle States Association of Colleges and Schools, the National Association of Schools of Art and Design, and the Council for Interior Design Accreditation. FIT publishes research on store branding and store positioning. It is also a part of the Beta Theta Sigma chapter of Phi Theta Kappa, which has been active since 1999.

== Campus ==
The nine-building campus in the Midtown South neighborhood of Manhattan includes classrooms, television and radio studios, labs, design workshops, and multiple exhibition galleries.

The Conference Center at FIT features the John E. Reeves Great Hall, a space suitable for conferences, fashion shows, lectures, and other events. The campus also has two large theaters: the Haft Auditorium and the Katie Murphy Amphitheatre.

FIT serves more than 7,578 full-time and 2,186 part-time students. Four dormitories, three of which are on campus, serve approximately 2,300 students and offer a variety of accommodations. The George S. and Mariana Kaufman Residence Hall located at 406 West 31st Street—formerly a book bindery factory—was converted into residential apartments, to offer more housing near the campus for FIT students. The campus also has a retail food court/dining hall, a deli and a Starbucks.

=== Academic facilities ===
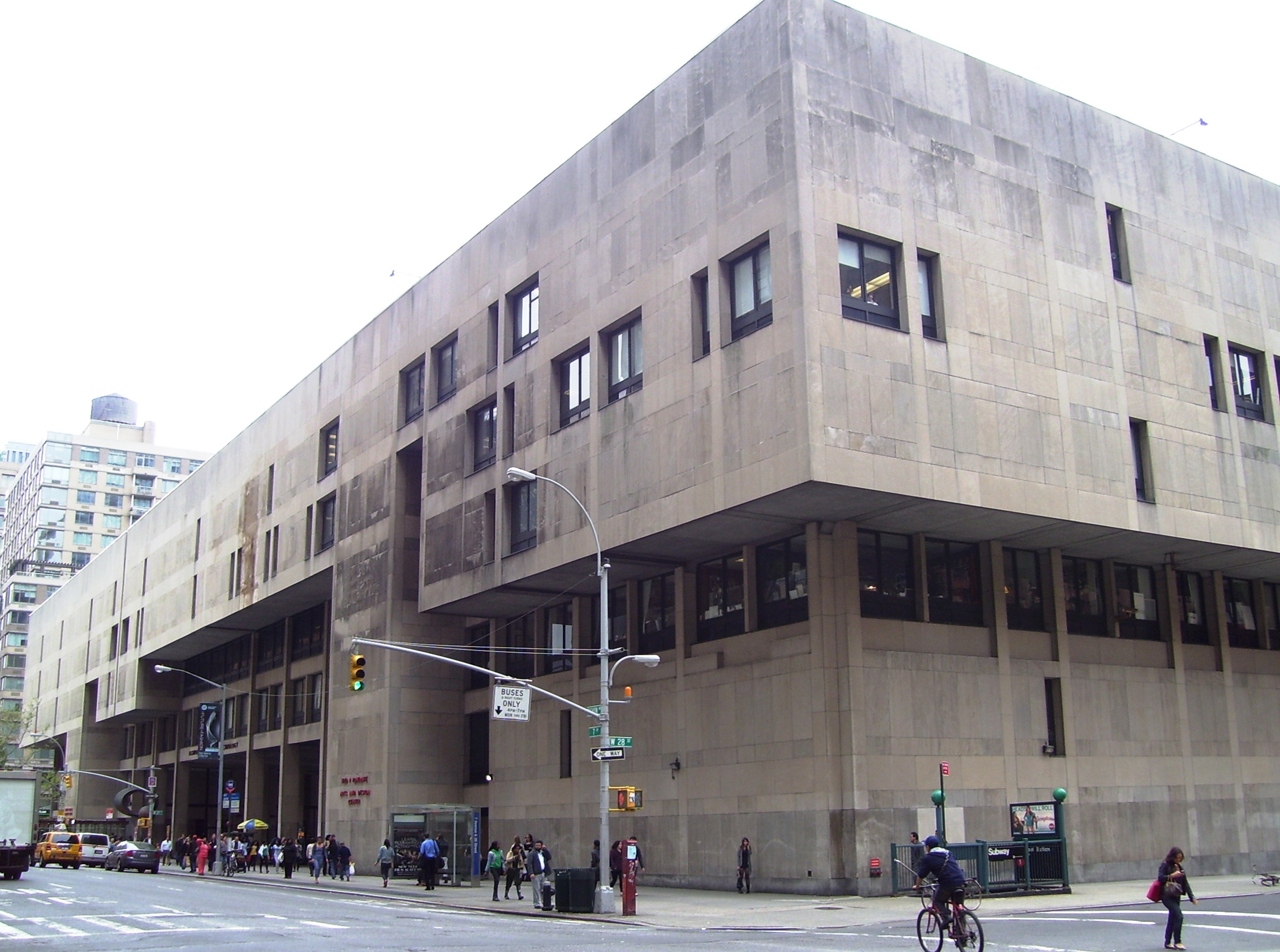
The Fred P. Pomerantz Art & Design Center (near) and the Shirley Goodman Resource Center (far) straddle the 27th Street entrance to the campus.

The Fred P. Pomerantz Art and Design Center offers facilities for design studies: photography studios with black-and-white darkrooms, painting rooms, a sculpture studio, a printmaking room, a graphics laboratory, display and exhibit design rooms, life-sketching rooms, and a model-making workshop. The Shirley Goodman Resource Center houses the Museum at FIT and the Library/Media Services, with references for history, sociology, technology, art, and literature; international journals and periodicals; sketchbooks and records donated by designers, manufacturers, and merchants; slides, tapes, and periodicals; and a clipping file. The Gladys Marcus Library provides access to books, periodicals, DVDs and non-print materials, and houses Fashion Institute of Technology Special Collections and College Archives. FIT also has many computer labs for student use. The Instructional Media Services Department provides audiovisual and TV support and an in-house TV studio. Student work is also displayed throughout the campus. Fashion shows featuring the work of graduating Bachelor of Fine Arts students occur each academic year.

The Design/Research Lighting Laboratory, a development facility for interior design and other academic disciplines, features 400 commercially available lighting fixtures controlled by a computer. The Annette Green/Fragrance Foundation Laboratory is an environment for the study of fragrance development.

== Museum at FIT ==
The Museum at FIT
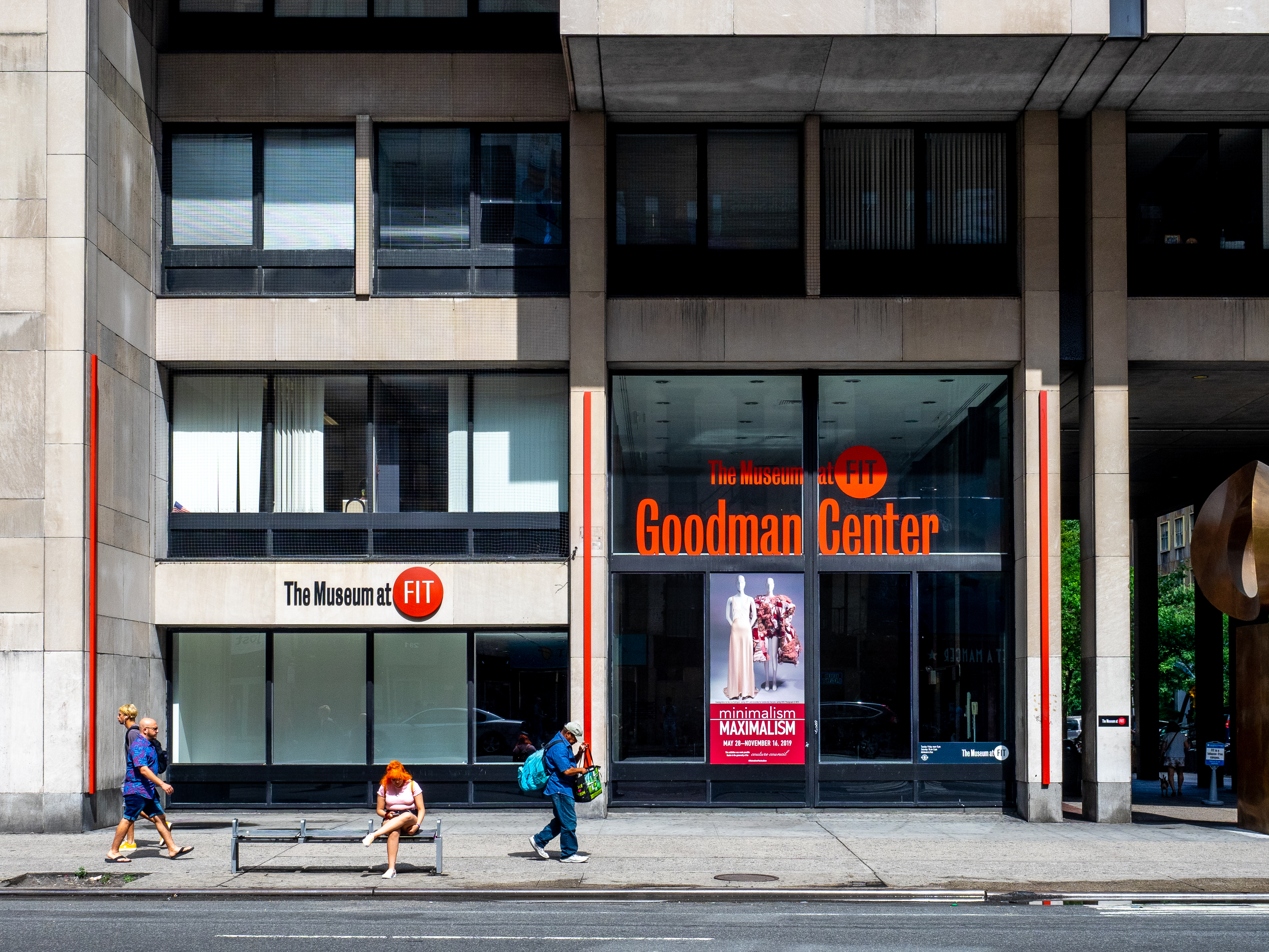
- Established: 1969
- Type: Design/Textile Museum
- Director: Valerie Steele
- Public transit access: New York City Subway: at 28th Street; New York City Bus: M5, M7, M20, M23
- Website: fitnyc.edu/museum

The Museum at FIT, founded in 1969 as the Design Laboratory, includes collections of clothing, textiles, and accessories.

It began presenting exhibitions in the 1970s, utilizing a collection on long-term loan from the Brooklyn Museum of Art, and then over time acquiring its own collection as well as thousands of textiles and other fashion-related material. In 1993, the Board of Trustees of FIT, noting the significance of the Design Laboratory's collections and exhibitions, changed the institution's name to The Museum at FIT. In 2012, the museum was awarded accreditation by the American Alliance of Museums.

The museum's permanent collection now includes more than 50,000 garments and accessories from the 18th century to the present. Important designers such as Adrian, Balenciaga, Chanel, and Dior are represented. The collecting policy of the museum focuses on aesthetically and historically significant clothing, accessories, textiles and visual materials, with emphasis on contemporary avant-garde fashion.

There are three galleries in the museum. The lower level gallery is devoted to special exhibitions. The Fashion and Textile History Gallery on the main floor features a rotating selection of approximately 200 historically and artistically significant objects from the museum's permanent collection. Gallery FIT, also located on the main floor, is dedicated to student and faculty exhibitions.

Past exhibitions include: London Fashion, which received the first Richard Martin Award for Excellence in Costume Exhibitions from The Costume Society of America, The Corset: Fashioning the Body, and Gothic: Dark Glamour. Other special exhibitions have included Isabel Toledo: Fashion From the Inside Out, in which the inauguration day ensemble Isabel Toledo designed for Michelle Obama in 2008 was on display, and a look at sustainable fashion with Eco-Fashion: Going Green, an exhibition from 2010 examining the past two centuries of fashion's good—and bad—environmental and ethical practices.

More than 100,000 people visit the Museum at FIT each year, attending exhibitions, lectures, and other events. Admission is free to the public.

Fashion historian Valerie Steele became director of the Museum in 2003, and has also been named chief curator.

== Controversies ==
In February 2020, the social media watchdog Diet Prada posted a critique of FIT after a fashion showcase that it alleged was racist. The show depicted models wearing exaggerated plastic lips and ear accessories. The sole black model in the showcase, Amy LeFevre declined to wear the items upon seeing the accessories, feeling that it entertained a history of racial caricature. The organizer of the controversial segment, Junkai Huang, was a recent MFA graduate from FIT and said that he was not aware of the history, that the paraphernalia was meant to reflect his "own body features and perceptions of their enlarged proportions, which should be celebrated and embraced."

After the social media outcry, FIT President Joyce Brown publicly apologized to LeFevre and the other models, as well as Huang, who she excused from any racist intent. She wrote that, instead of Huang,"those in charge of and responsible for overseeing the show failed to recognize or anticipate the racist references and cultural insensitivities that were obvious to almost everybody else." She put the head of the graduate school, Amy Brown, and the chair of the fashion design department Jonathan Kyle Farmer on temporary administrative leave during the investigation. FIT students and faculty continued to criticize the school after Brown's apology, feeling that FIT had broader problems with racial discrimination and diversity, and that the administration had waited until a controversy to address the problems with the fashion show. In 2022, FIT opened a center for social justice, a decision it rooted in the 2020 conversations around racism at the school.

In November 2020, Mary Davis was officially terminated from FIT. She sued the college, alleging that Brown's letter had defamed her and made her the scapegoat for the incident. New York State Supreme Court judge Lynn Kotler dismissed Davis's claim, ruling that the letter had not claimed anything untrue about Davis or her conduct. A separate FIT employee, longtime clerical worker Marjorie Phillips—who is black—sued the college in the Southern District of New York (SDNY) for what she claimed was FIT's failure to respond to reports she had made about racist behavior in the graduate school. SDNY magistrate judge Sarah Netburn dismissed Phillips case and ordered that her lawyer pay FIT's attorney fees.

In September 2024, the Brandeis Center and the Anti Defamation League filed a civil rights complaint against FIT. The complaint alleged that Jewish students at FIT were subjected to "severe and pervasive" antisemitic harassment, discrimination, and disparate treatment in violation of Title VI of the Civil Rights Act. An anonymous Jewish student sued FIT in 2025, alleging that she was wrongly suspended after an incident with an anti-Israel protester during the 2024 protests against the Gaza war. SDNY judge John P. Cronan dismissed the case in July 2025 on the basis of the plaintiff's insubstantial justification for her anonymity. FIT has stated that it "does not and will not tolerate antisemitism."

== Alumni ==
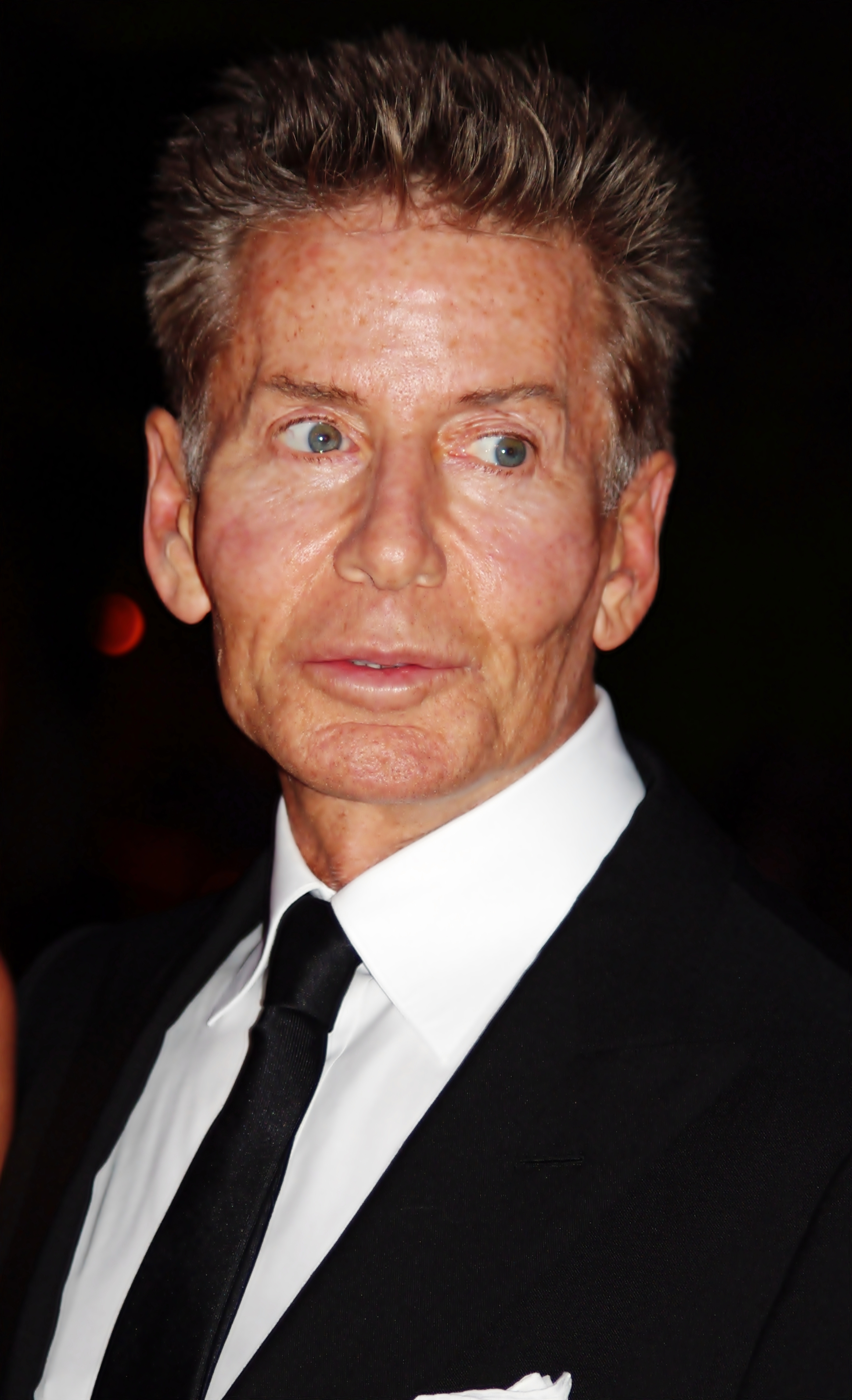
Calvin Klein, founder of Calvin Klein, Inc.

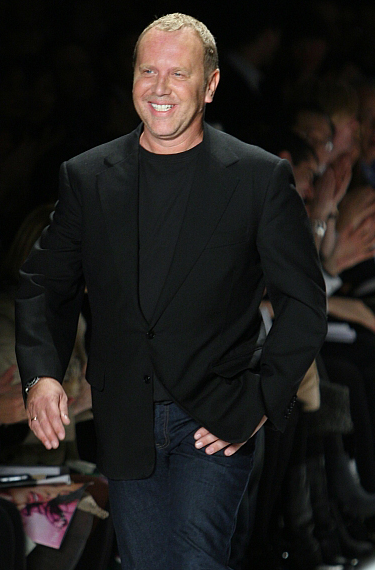
Michael Kors, fashion designer, President and CEO of Michael Kors

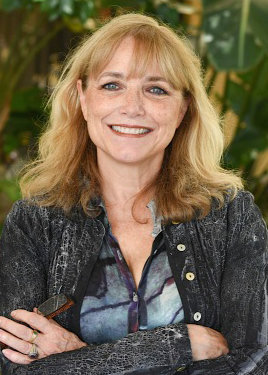
Karen Allen, actress

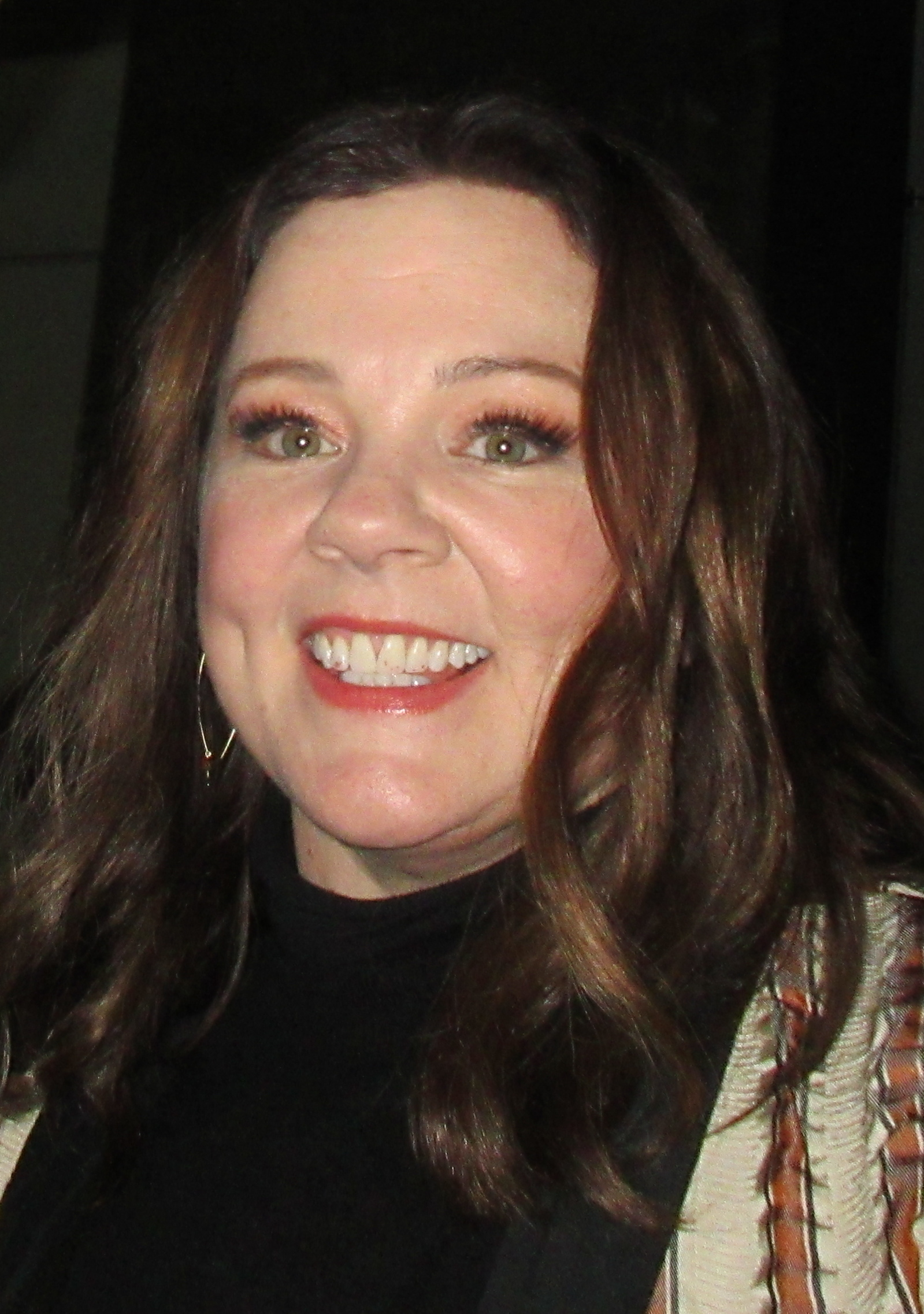
Melissa McCarthy, actress, comedian, writer and producer

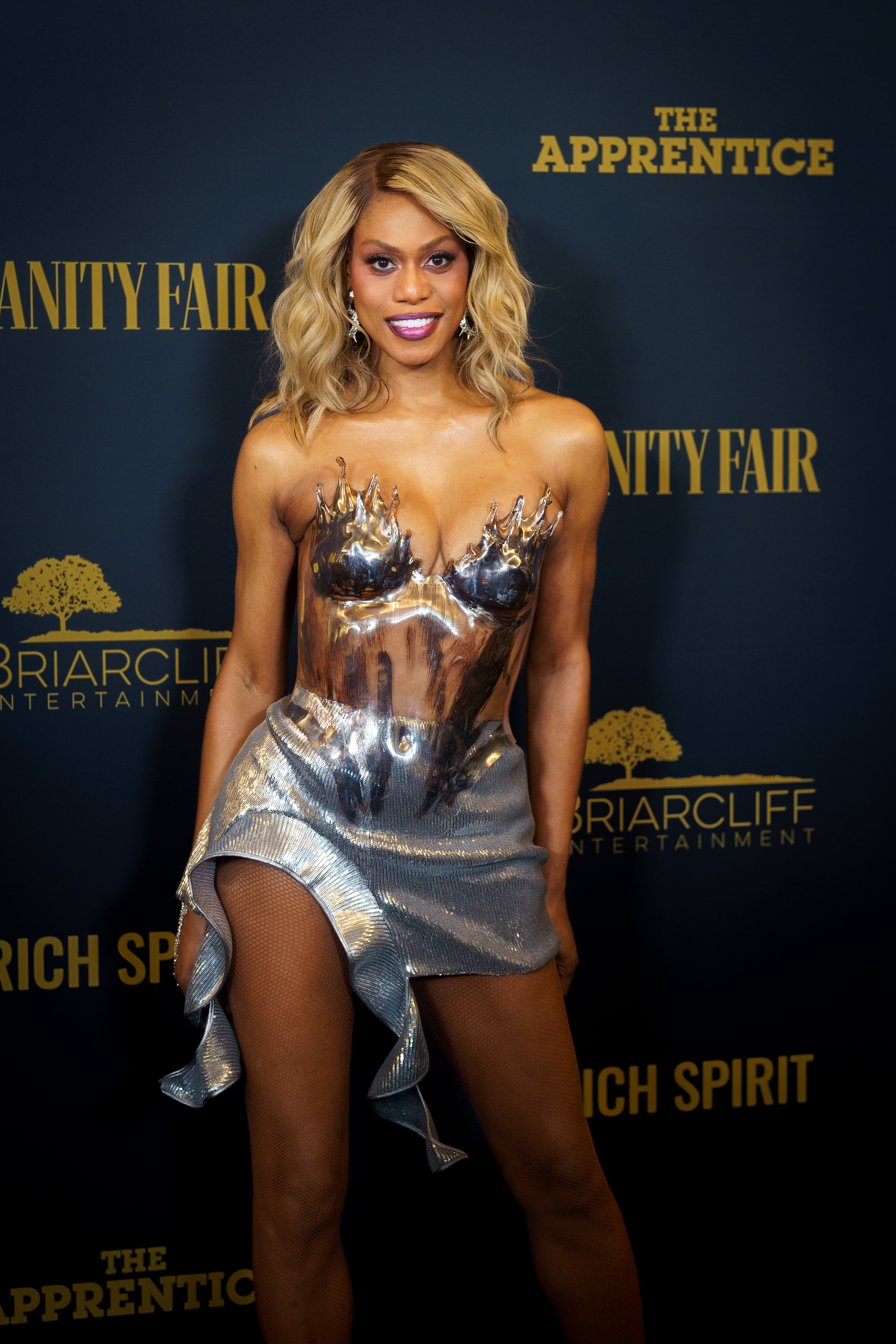
Laverne Cox, actress and LGBT advocate

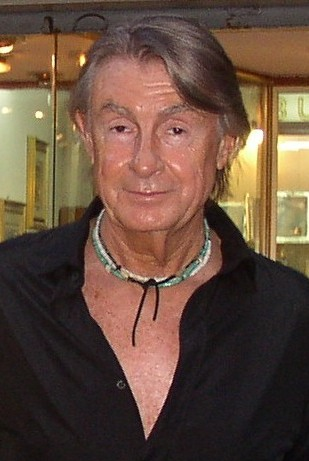
Joel Schumacher, director, producer, writer, costume designer

Well-known alumni of the school include the fashion designers Norma Kamali, Calvin Klein, Michael Kors (who did not complete his studies there), interior designer Scott Salvator, actress and comedian Janelle James, actresses Karen Allen and Melissa McCarthy, actress and LGBT advocate Laverne Cox and film director Joel Schumacher.
