= List of ambassadors of Albania to the United States =

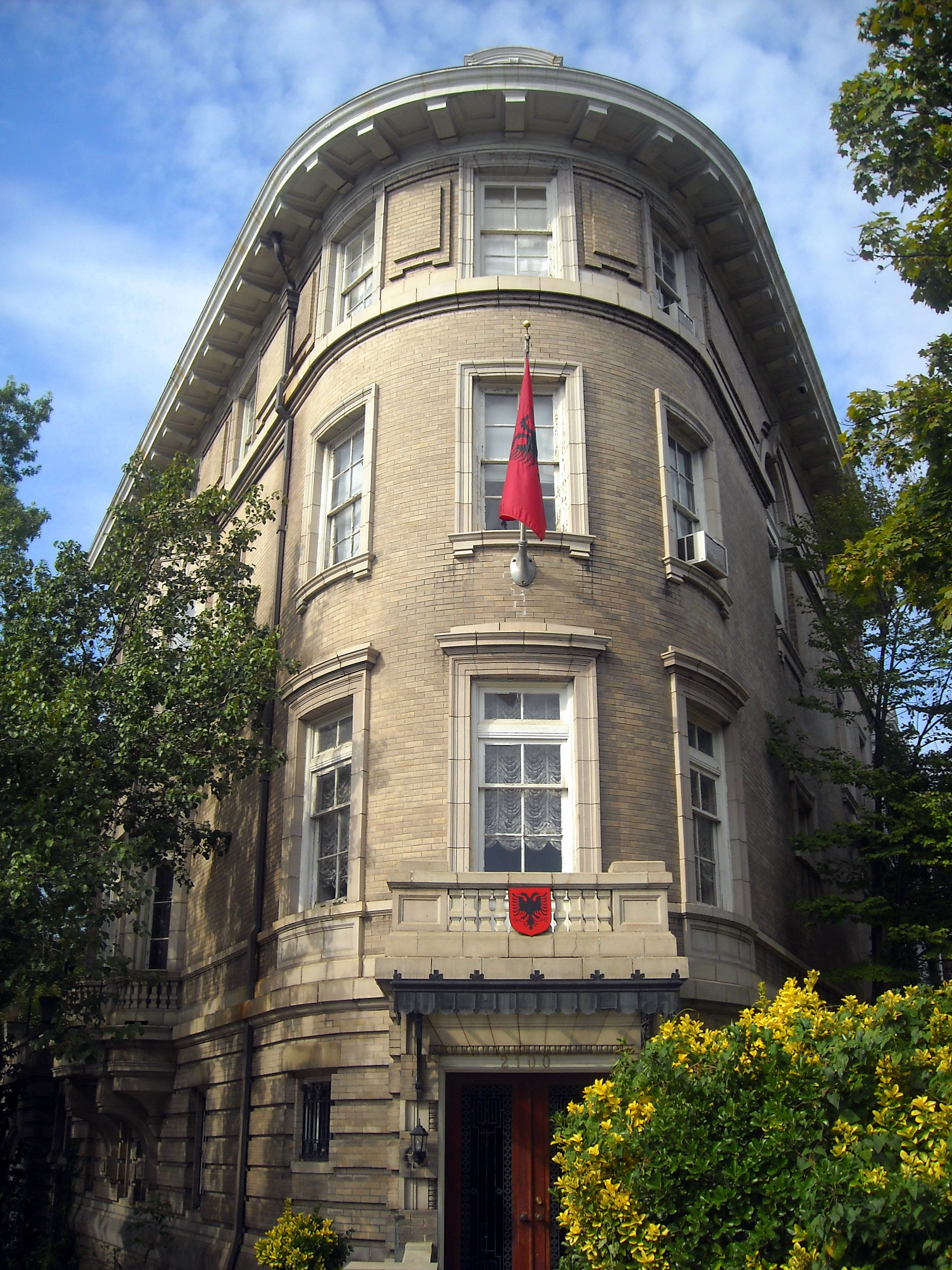
Embassy of Albania in Washington D.C.

The United States officially recognised Albania as an Independent state on August 28, 1922. Shortly thereafter, a consulate office was opened in New York and the two countries had finally established diplomatic ties. During the onset of World War II, on September 16, 1939, the US Legation closed its mission in Albania. As a result, bilateral relations were suspended and remained so for a period of 52 years. Relations were finally restored on March 15, 1991, when William Ryerson became the first US ambassador since the war to serve in the country.

== List of diplomatic representatives of Albania to the United States (1920–present) ==
No.	Name	Title	Term served
1	Kristo Kirka	Emissary	1920	1920
2	Costa Chekrezi	Representative	1920	1922
3	Kostandin Tashko	Consul	1922	1923
4	Avdyl Sula	Consul	1923	1925
5	Fazlli Frashëri	Consul	1925	1925
6	Haki Blloshmi	Consul	1925	1929
7	George N. Prifti	Consul	1926	1930
8	Faik Konica	Ambassador	1926	1939
Suspended diplomatic ties (1939–1991)
9	Roland Bimo	Ambassador	1992	1994
10	Lublin Dilja	Ambassador	1994	1997
11	Petrit Bushati	Ambassador	1997	2001
12	Fatos Tarifa	Ambassador	2001	2005
13	Agim Nesho	Ambassador	2005	2006
14	Aleksandër Sallabanda	Ambassador	2006	2011
15	Gilbert Galanxhi	Ambassador	2011	2015
16	Floreta Faber	Ambassador	2015	2023
17	Ervin Bushati	Ambassador	2023	Present
