= Gaqo Jorganxhi =

Albanian singer and composer

Gaqo Jorganxhi AM
- Born: 15 March 1902; Korçë, Ottoman Empire
- Died: 11 November 1985 (aged 83); Tirana, Albania
- Occupations: Singer; actor; composer; conductor; musician
- Musical career
- Genres: Folk; classical
- Instruments: Vocals, bassoon

Gaqo Jorganxhi (Albanian pronunciation: [ˈgacɔ jɔɾˈgandʒi]; 14 or 15 March 1902 – 10 or 11 November 1985) was an Albanian baritone singer, actor, composer, conductor and musician from Korçë.

== Early life ==
Gaqo Jorganxhi was born in Korçë, Ottoman Empire (now Albania) on 15 March 1902, into an Albanian family from Manastir (now Bitola, North Macedonia). His three brothers, also musicians in their own right, were all part of the "Vatra" Society after immigrating to the United States. At age 14, while working in a quarry due to financial difficulties, he was distinguished for his voice. He performed as a choirboy in churches throughout the city.

== Career ==
In 1920, with the arrival of Thoma Nashi and his band "Vatra", he participated actively in the band as a bassoonist, as soloist in the "Artet e bukura" Artistic Society and then in "Djelmuria korçare" group. In 1922, he performed for the first time as a solo singer and performed as an actor in Mihal Grameno's Vdekja e Piros ("The Death of Pyrrhus"). With the creation of the "Lira" Society in 1928 he performed as a solo singer and started his concerting career. During the nazi-fascist occupation he was arrested three times for his artistic and patriotic activity. He composed the song Çlirimi i Korçës ("Liberation of Korça"), which would be sung during the liberation of the city from German occupation on 24 October 1944. After the liberation of Albania, he continued his work both as a quilter and an artist. In 1954, he performed as Murr Keçi in the first Albanian operetta from composer Kristo Kono. With the reformation of the "Lira" Artistic Group in 1956, he once again performed as a solo singer all over Albania.

Jorganxhi was known for his bass-baritone voice, performing songs such as Kënga e Mullirit ("Song of the Mill"), Shpatari i Skënderbeut ("The Swordsman of Skanderbeg"), Një zë popullit ("One Voice of the People"), Kënga e beqarit ("The Song of the Bachelor"), Ardhi koha ("The Time Has Come"), Vallja e vëllazërisë ("The Dance of Brotherhood"), Përpara zogu i detit ("In Front the Bird of the Sea"), Lamtumirë o e dashura e mjerrë ("Farewell o Wretched Lover").

Jorganxhi was also a composer, writing from a young age songs such as Sytë e tu bukur kulluar ("Your Pretty Lucent Eyes"), Vajzë pse rri helmuar ("Maiden Why Do You Stay Poisoned"), S'të ardhi pak keq për mua ("Did You Not Feel Bad for Me"), Ardha të t’bashkoj ("I Came to Unite You"), Çlirimi i Korçës ("The Liberation of Korça"), Kënga e Sindikatave ("The Song of the Unions"), Kultura fizike ("Physical Education"), O vëllezër shqiptarë ("O Albanian Brothers"), Kënga e minatorëve ("The Song of the Miners"), etc.

== Personal life ==
Jorganxhi died in Tirana on 11 November 1985. His musical legacy was continued by his children and grandchildren: his daughter Zhuliana (b. 1946) is a writer and poet; his other daughter Rozmari (1937-2020) was a mezzo-soprano and conductor; his son Rikard is a conductor and composer; his grandson Gjergj Leka (b. 1962) is a composer and singer; his other grandson Lambert Jorganxhi is a composer; his other grandson Hektor Leka is a singer; and his great-grandchild Dorina Leka is a musician.
