= Kristo Floqi =

Albanian journalist and politician (1876–1951)

Kristo V. Floqi
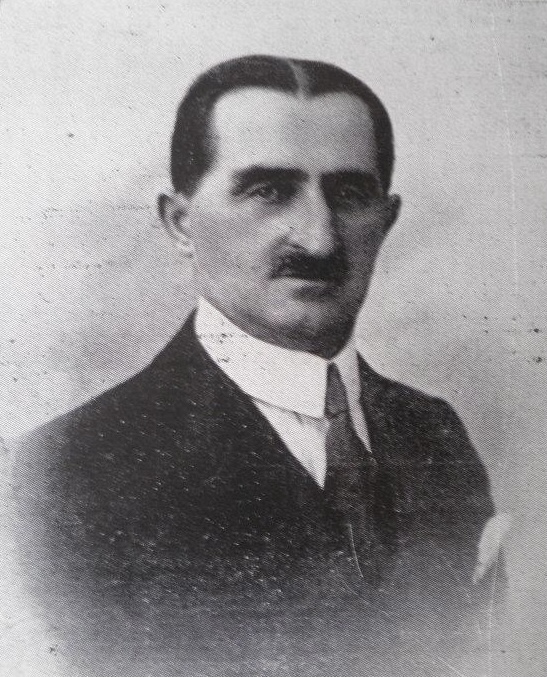
- Born: 24 May 1876 (Note: Elsie places year of birth as 1873. 24 May 1872 is given by Floqi himself in his auto-biography, Albanian archives); Korçë, Manastir vilayet, Ottoman Empire
- Died: 1 July 1951 (aged 75); Tirana, Albania
- Occupations: lawyer, playwright, publisher, politician
- Known for: Dielli newspaper Vatra, the Pan-Albanian Federation of America
- Spouse: Urani Floqi (Poçi)

Kristo Floqi (24 May 1876 – 1 July 1951) was an Albanian patriot, playwright, politician and lawyer.

== Life ==
Floqi was born in Korçë, Manastir vilayet, Ottoman Empire (today Albania), son of a merchant (Vasil Floqi). He had three brothers: Dhimitër, Nikollaq, Thanas who would become one of the signatories of the Albanian Declaration of Independence, and a sister named Katerina. He studied law in Athens. After graduating in 1899 he returned to his home town where he worked as a lawyer for six years. He went in Istanbul to master the Ottoman Turkish language where he got in touch with Albanian patriotic clubs. Hid activity forced him to move back to his home town, then to Greece, then back to Vlore, and at last in Boston, MA. There he became editor of the Albanian weekly Dielli (The sun) in September 1911. Together with Fan Noli and Faik Konitza he was one of the main contributors for the congress of the Albanian patriotic clubs merge, where Vatra, the Pan-Albanian Federation of America was created. During the winter of 1912–1913 he moved to New York City where he started his short-lived newspaper Zëri i Popullit ('Voice of the People').

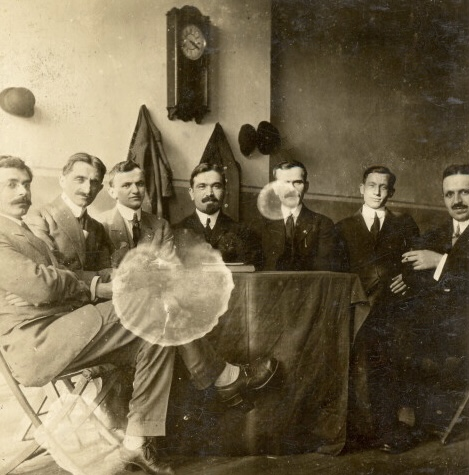
Council of VATRA foundation, 1912: 1. Paskal Aleksi 2.Kristo Floqi 3.Elia Tromara 4.Fan Noli 5.Llambi Cikozi 6. Y.Dimitri 7. Faik Konitza

Right after the Albanian Declaration of Independence, Floqi moved back to Albania and offered himself in the project of the new judicial system that the Vlora government would start. After the Italians took over Vlora, he would move to Shkoder where he practiced law during World War I. There he would publish the local newspaper Agimi (The dawn) for the Vllazenija (Brotherhood) society in 1919. In 1920, he was appointed as the Court of Appeal in Shkoder. In December 1920 he became Minister of Education in the government of Ilias Bey Vrioni. He appointed Christo Dako as general Inspector of Education. During his service time as Minister of Education the number of schools in Albania increased from 318 to 544. For a brief time he also acted as Minister of Finances, substituting Tef Currani who was sent in Rome.
In 1921 he became representative of Dibra in the newly elected parliament. Following the 1922 insurrection against the Zogu Government, by the Dibra guerrillas of Elez Isufi, Zija Dibra, and Cen Elezi with the support of Hasan Prishtina, the parliament voted and classified the Dibra representatives as illegitimate, causing all (including Floqi) to lose their mandate. Inspired by the events, he wrote a hymn which would become later the hymn of the Albanian Monarchy, composed by Thoma Nasi.
In 1922, he stayed for a few months in Vienna, trying to enlist his son in an Austrian college. There, he got in contact and met with former Albanian Prince, Wied.
After the 1924 June Revolution, Ahmet Zogu enlisted him in the representative list of the Korçë region. After the elections in January 1925, he was elected again in the Albanian Parliament. On 17 January 1925 he started the newspaper Indipendenca shqiptare (Albanian independence), which came out twice a week in Tirana. During this time he purchased a small parcel of land and built a 1 floor Elbasan-style house. Zog offered him to become the President of the Assembly, which he rejected, as he did when he was proposed another position in the judicial system. Being aware of the Zogu's plans for switching from Republic to Monarchy, he did not run in the next elections 1928. The new Constitutional Assembly declared Ahmet Zogu the "King of Albania". His relationship with Zogu and Kostaq Kotta would harsh. Floqi worked as a lawyer until 1929, when he became member of the State Council. He resigned soon after and worked as a lawyer until 1936, when Mehdi Frashëri's intervention made possible for him to return as member of the State Council.
During the Italian invasion of Albania, he kept the same position although not in good relations with Shefqet Verlaci, the new prime minister of the Italian puppet government.
He got arrested by the Communists in 1945 (or 1946), he did several years of jail and then released due to his age. His house got confiscated by the Communist Government. He died in 1951 soon after his wife. His son was interned in Lezhë. Like many others, his name would be hidden during the Communist period.

== Work ==
Floqi is one of the most known Albanian dramatists of the first half of the 20th century. His main works are:

Dramas and tragedies:

- Fe e kombësi (Religion and nationality)
- Karlo Topija (Karl Topia)
- Piro Neoptolemi (Pyrrhys Neoptolemus)
- Qyprilinjtë (The Köprülüs)
- Skanderbeu n'Itali (Scanderbeg in Italy)
- Fatzeza (The unfortunate)
- Triumfi i Lirisë (The triumph of freedom)

Comedies (including translations)

- Rrogat e nënpunësve (Clerks' salaries)
- Lojnat e studentëve (Student games)
- Do të vras vedin (I will kill the place)
- Vllazëni e interesë (Brotherhood and interest)
- E bija e bankjerit (Banker's daughter)
- Dhëndër me përdhuni (Bridegroom by force)
- Merre t'a marrim (Like this and like that)
- Nder e qytetni (Honor and civilization)
- Kundërshtarët e prikës (Opponents of dowry)
- Pësimet – mësime (Incurrence – experience)
- Zi e më zi (Worse and worse)
- Reklamë e blofë (Publicity and bluff)
- E mbesa e krahinarit (Head of region's niece)
- Akraballëket (Favorizations)
- Ministri kandidat (Candidate minister)
- Kopraci i Molierit (The Misanthrope of Molier)
- Monologë komike theatrore (Theatrical Comical Monologues)
- Antigoni e Sofokliut (Antigonea of Sofokles)
- Mbreti Edipus i Sofokliut (Edipus of Sofokles)
- Midhia e Euripidit (Mydia of Euripides)
- Tezja e Karlit (Carl's aunt)
- Burri burrë (Swear on it)
