= Besa-Besën =

"Pledge for a Pledge" Society
- Besa-Besën
- Merged into: Vatra, the Pan-Albanian Federation of America
- Formation: 6 January 1907
- Type: Patriotic, cultural, political
- Headquarters: Boston, Massachusetts
- Region served: USA
- Official language: Albanian, English
- President: Fan Noli (until March 1908); Kristo Kirka (from March 1908)
- Vice President: Goni Katundi
- Treasurer: Angelo Stefenson (Katundi)
- Key people: Sotir Peçi; Fan Noli; Petro Nini Luarasi

Besa-Besën (Pledge for a Pledge) was an organization of Albanian emigrants in Boston, Massachusetts.

The society was founded on January 6, 1907, in Boston. The elected president was Fan Noli, vice-president Goni Katundi, treasurer Angelo Stefenson, and secretary Nini Fani Katundi. It had an elderly council as advisory body.

The society gave a contribute in establishment of the Albanian Orthodox Church in March 1908, where Fan Noli was ordained priest by Platon, the Russian Mitropolite of New York. The same month Noli gave the first sermon in Albanian in Knights of Honor Hall of Boston. The church of Saint George was the first Albanian American church, and the first Albanian Orthodox church in overall. Meanwhile, Kristo Kirka became President of the society. The society contributed also in the spread of Albanian education in Ottoman Albania, i.e. the Normal School of Elbasan, the first institution for higher education in Albanian.

On February 15, 1909, the society started the publication of Dielli, which is still published today, being one of the oldest Albanian-language newspapers. Its manager was Fan Noli, until October 22 when Faik Konitza came and took over.

On April 28, 1912, Besa-Besën together with other Albanian-American organizations (Flamuri i Krujes, Keshilli Kombetar, Dallandyshja, and other smaller organizations) merged into Vatra, the Pan-Albanian Federation of America. Dielli was carried over as a Vatra publication, and Kristo Kirka was elected as manager.
