= The Adriatic Review =

American periodical published in 1918–1919

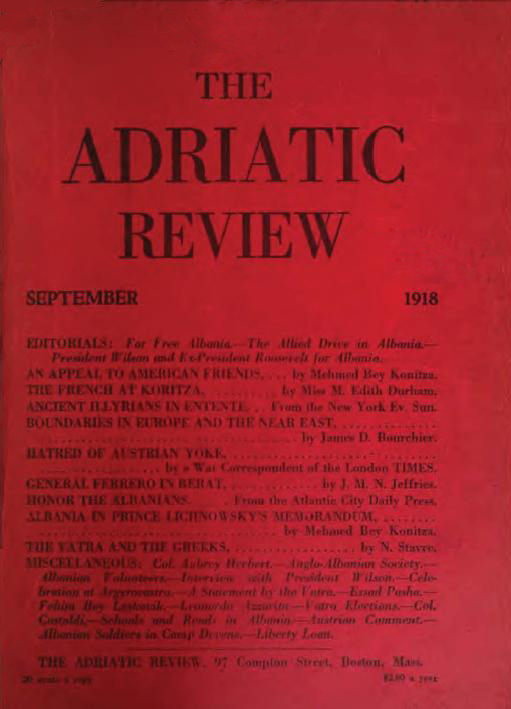
- Editor: Costa Chekrezi
- Former editors: Fan Noli
- Frequency: Monthly
- Publisher: Vatra, the Pan-Albanian Federation of America
- First issue: September 1918
- Final issue: October 1919
- Country: US
- Based in: Boston, MA
- Language: English
- OCLC: 8267885

The Adriatic Review was a monthly periodical published in Boston by Vatra from September 1918 until October 1919. In September 1918, Fan Noli founded the English-language monthly Adriatic Review which was financed by the Pan-Albanian federation to spread information about Albania and its cause.

Noli edited the journal for the first six months, and was succeeded in 1919 by Kostë Çekrezi.

== See also ==
- Vatra, the Pan-Albanian Federation of America
- Zëri i Popullit (1912)
- Fan Noli
- Kostë Çekrezi
