= Dardhë =

- Village
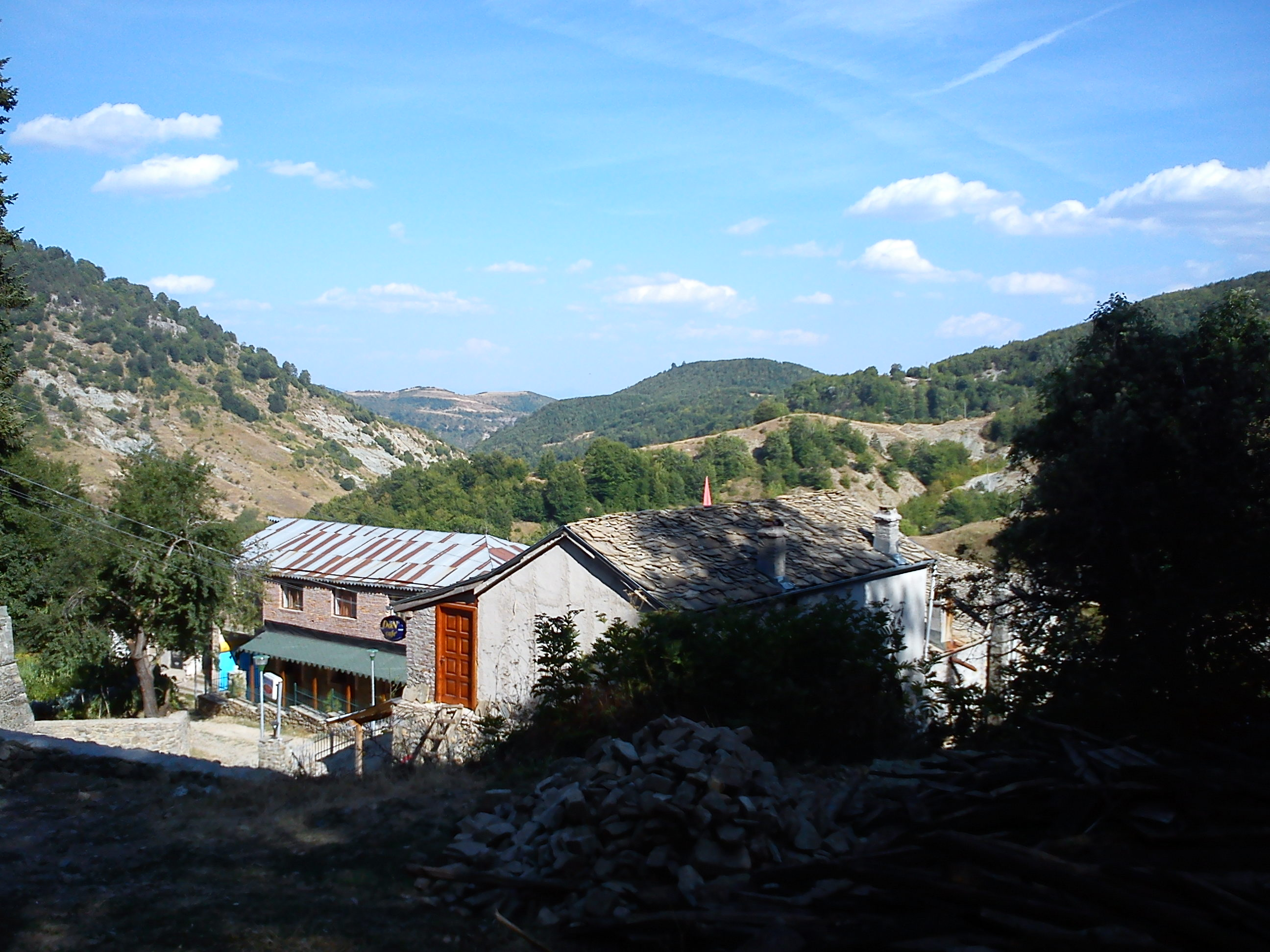

- Location within Albania
- Coordinates: 40°31′7″N 20°49′37″E
- Country: Albania
- County: Korçë
- Municipality: Korçë
- Administrative unit: Drenovë
- Elevation: 1,248 m (4,094 ft)

Population (2000)
  - Total: 502
- Time zone: UTC+1 (CET)
  - Summer (DST): UTC+2 (CEST)

Dardhë (Albanian: [ˈdaɾðə]; Albanian definite form: Dardha, literally "pear") is a community in the former municipality of Drenovë in Korçë County, Albania. After local government reform in 2015, it became part of the municipality Korçë. It is a well known ski area of Albania since the 1920s. In 2012, the first ever ski tow in Albania was opened at Bigell Ski Resort near Dardhë.

== Demographics ==
Dardhë is populated by an Orthodox Albanian population with a minority Aromanian population documented after 1950. There are a few families who were previously nomadic before settling in the village long before the Ottoman invasion in the region. Much of the Orthodox Albanian population has moved away to Albanian cities such as Korçë and Tirana or migrated to Greece, Romania or the United States.

== History ==
The town of Dardhë was first founded after the death of Skanderbeg by Albanian Orthodox individuals fleeing into the mountains to avoid the Ottoman administration. Unlike villages located in the Gramos mountains, Dardhë did not undergo any serious collapse or destruction during Ottoman rule.

A Greek school was founded in the village in 1810 by Ikonomou Isidoros while Greek education was flourishing with the establishment of additional schools at the beginning of the 20th century: a girls' school (1901-1902) and a middle level school. In the school season of 1901-1902 a total of 150 students attended the Greek schools, which were sponsored by the local community fund, as well as the local Orthodox Church. The first Albanian school opened in 1917 with the initiative of Leonidha Çika, which started with 20 students, and with financing from the Vatra, which sponsors the new school in 1924 that is still in place today.

Dardhë has historically suffered from heavy emigration. Many families originating from the area would form the first Albanian community in the United States and Romania. People from Dardhë have been immense contributors to Albanian-American organizations. Sotir Peçi, Josif Pani, and Gjergj Konda, among others, would start the society Besa-Besë, the Kombi newspaper, and the unification of the Albanian American societies into a single federation, Vatra, with Sotir Peçi as one of the initial founders.

Current Prime Minister Edi Rama has some family roots in Dardhë. In the past years, it has become a destination mainly for internal tourism by Albanian citizens, creating jobs for Dardhë residents.

== Notable people ==
- Sotir Peçi, mathematician, former Minister of Education and publisher
- Kostandin and Athanas Zografi, brothers, 18th century painters, distinguished for their work in Ardenica Monastery, Vithkuq, Moscopole and Mount Athos
- Teodor Laço, writer and diplomat
- Polycarpos of Larissa (-1821), Orthodox bishop of Larissa
- Thomas Nassi, musician

== See also ==
- Tourism in Albania
- List of ski areas and resorts in Europe
- Vatra, the Pan-Albanian Federation of America
