= Dielli =

Dielli may refer to:

- Dielli (Albanian paganism), the Sun in Albanian ethnic religion
- Dielli (newspaper), newspaper published in the United States
