= American Chamber of Commerce in Albania =

- Type: Advocacy group
- Legal status: Non-Profit
- Headquarters: Tirana, Albania
- Main organ: Board of Directors
- Website: www.amcham.com.al

== History ==
The American Chamber of Commerce in Albania was formed as an Albanian not-for-profit in August 2000. The American Chamber of Commerce in Albania is a private business promotion and development organization, which tries to increase trade between the United States and Albania.

== Membership ==
AmCham Albania's membership currently comprises over 200 companies. Members include some of the world's biggest brands and leading multinationals from across all industries and business sectors. From 2019 the president of AmCham Albania is Enio Jaco.

== Committees ==
1. CEO's Forum
2. Intellectual Property Rights
3. Tax and Legal
4. Women in Business
5. Corporate Social Responsibility

== Contact Information ==
   American Chamber of Commerce in Albania
   Rr. Ibrahim Rugova, Sky Tower, kati 11 Ap 3
   1000 Tirana, Albania
   www.amcham.com.al

== Affiliate organizations ==
- United States Chamber of Commerce
- American Chamber of Commerce to the European Union

== Sources ==
AmCham Albania website *
