= Ervin Bushati =

Albanian politician

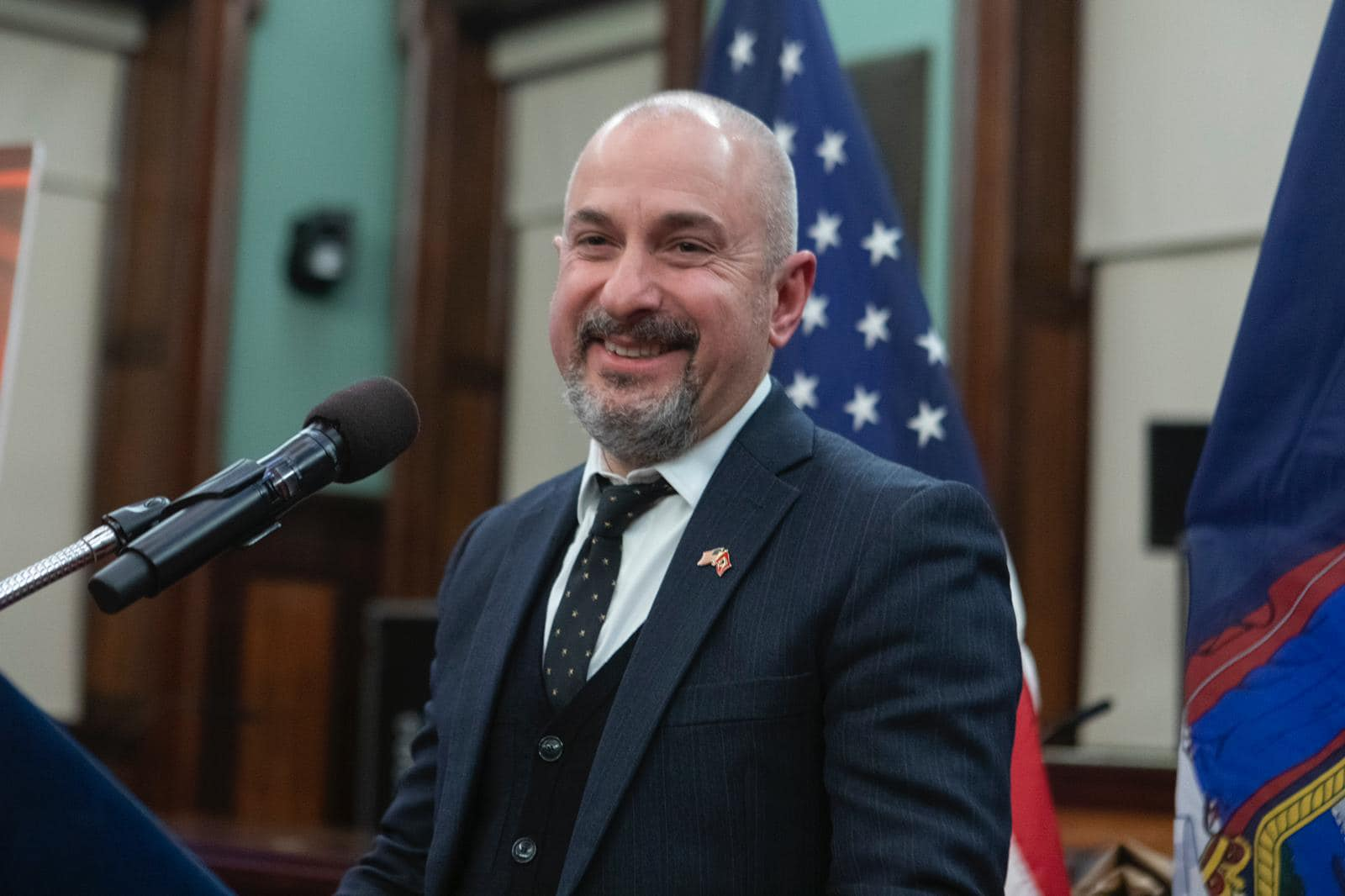
- Bushati in 2023

Albanian Ambassador to the United States
- Incumbent
- Assumed office 11 July 2023
- President: Bajram Begaj
- Prime Minister: Edi Rama
- Preceded by: Floreta Faber

Personal details
- Born: 15 October 1975 (age 51) Tirana, PR Albania
- Education: DePaul University

Ervin Bushati (born 15 October 1975) is an Albanian politician and diplomat who is serving as the Albanian Ambassador to the United States since July 2023.

== Early and Personal Life ==
Bushati was born on 15 October 1975 near Shkodër, PSR Albania. (Now Republic of Albania)

Before his political career, Bushati earned a bachelor's degree in finance-economics from DePaul University in Chicago, United States. He also has a background in business as the founder and managing director of "Bushati Konstruksion" sh.p.k. from 2001 to 2013, where he managed real estate development projects and fostered client relationships.

== Business and Political Career ==
Prior to his ambassadorial role, Bushati held various significant positions. He served as the Head of Delegation to the Parliamentary Assembly of the Council of Europe (PACE) from 2017 to 2021, where he facilitated dialogue between the EU and Albania, monitored the Council of Europe's work, and promoted EU policies in Albania. He also served as a member of parliament of the Republic of Albania from 2013 to 2021, contributing to committees focused on economy, finance, foreign policy, trade, and environment.

== Role as Albanian Ambassador to the US ==
Bushati is a prominent Albanian diplomat and politician currently serving as the Ambassador of the Republic of Albania to the United States since July 2023. In this capacity, he represents Albania in the US and also serves as the non-resident ambassador to several other countries in the region. His responsibilities include promoting Albania's image, facilitating diplomatic relations, fostering trade and commerce, negotiating agreements, and providing counsel to the Albanian government on US affairs while ensuring the protection of Albanian citizens in the USA.

Bushati's political involvement extends to leadership roles within the Socialist Party of Albania. He served as the Secretary of the Socialist Party Group in the Parliament of Albania from 2017 to 2021, providing strategic leadership and representing the party externally. Additionally, he held the position of Head of the Socialist Party of Tirana since 2019, overseeing municipal coordination and financial planning.

Furthermore, Bushati has experience in budgetary oversight, having served as the Head of the Sub-Committee of the State Budget in the Albanian Assembly from 2019 to 2021. He also chaired the Albanian-USA Friendship Group, strengthening relations between the two countries.

Throughout his career, Bushati has demonstrated leadership, diplomatic skills, and a commitment to promoting Albania's interests on the international stage. In his term, he has embraced many of the Albanian-American associations as a way of bringing the diaspora together in the United States.
