= Aleksandër Sallabanda =

Albanian politician

Aleksandër Sallabanda was the ambassador of Albania to the United States of America. The Albanian embassy is located in Washington, D.C.

== Education and career ==
Sallabanda received his PhD from the University of Tirana in Albania. He was the head of the Microbiology Laboratory at the University of Tirana Hospital of Pulmonary Disease and TB from 1985 to 1993. He also served as the head of the Department of Public Health at the university of Tirana from 1994 to 1997, and was then the Head of Health Policy Department for the Democratic Party of Albania from 1997 to 2005. From 2004 to 2006, he served as a member of the Council of Municipality of Tirana and as the Head of Health and Environmental Commission. In 2005 and 2006, he was the Deputy Minister of Health of Albania. He was appointed ambassador in February 2006, and presented his credentials on May 11, 2006.
