= Kristo Kirka =

Albanian politician (1883–1955)

Kristo Dhimitër Kirka
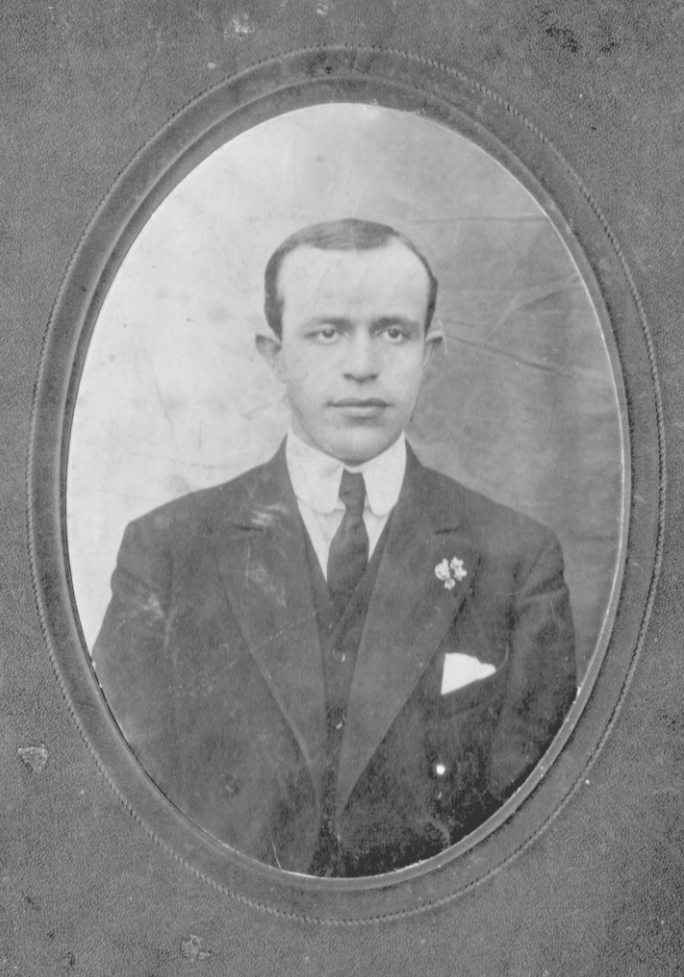
- Born: 17 January 1883; Korçë, Ottoman Empire
- Died: 28 April 1955 (aged 72); Burrel Prison, Albania
- Occupations: Politician, clerk, publicist
- Known for: Dielli newspaper Vatra Federation; Balli Kombetar
- Spouse: Androniqi Kirka

Kristo Kirka (17 January 1883 – 28 April 1955) was an Albanian patriot, diplomat, politician and activist. He is one of the most contributing figures of the Albanian national cause.

== Early life ==
Kirka was born on 17 January 1883 in Korçë, Ottoman Empire (today's Albania). Korçë was home of most of the activists of the Albanian National Awakening. He finished the elementary and high school in his home town in Greek language. From a young age he came in contact with Albanian patriotic circles of that time, following with a trial from the Ottoman authorities. Kirka skipped the trial and left the country, settling in Boston in 1905.

== As an emigrant in US ==
Kirka got engaged with the Boston-based Besa-Besën organization founded in 1907. In 1908, he went to New York to participate the ceremony of ordination of Fan Noli together with Sotir Peci and others. Following the engagement of Noli with the Albanian Orthodox Church in US, Kirka became president of "Besa-Besën". After the merging of the society with other Albanian-American organization and the formation of Vatra, the Pan-Albanian Federation of America, Kirka became manager of Dielli newspaper and head of the Vatra's Boston branch. In 1913, he was sent to meet with Albanian Colony of Romania as a representative of Vatra, from there Kirka went to Durrës to welcome the arrival of Prince Wied, newly elected Monarch of Albania.
In 1914 he joined the cheta of Themistokli Germenji, and left again for US in 1915. On 4 July 1915 he was elected vice-president of the Congress of Vatra, where was decided to send a delegation in Europe to support the Albanian cause together with the establishment of a support fund.

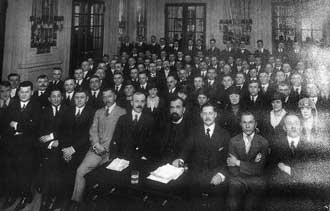
Vatra meeting in Boston, 1920. First row: Fan Noli and Kirka on his right

== Engagement in Albanian politics ==
In 1921, he accompanied Noli in his trip to Albania as a representative of Vatra. He was elected representative of Korce region in the first Albanian parliament. He joined the pro-British "People's Party" (Albanian: Partia e Popullit) of Noli, and was one of the contributors of its statute. He was one of the main supporters and participant in the Congress of Berat, where the autocephaly of the Albanian Orthodox Church was declared in 1922. In 1924, he was assigned as General Counsel of Albania in Boston, and later in NY. Meanwhile, from 1925 to 1929 he served as the President of Vatra Federation.
Kirka left US and returned to Albanian in 1933, this time bringing his family with him. In 1935 he was assigned as vice-prefect for Himara, where he fought against pro-Greek elements struggling for re-establishment of Greek schools in the area. In 1937, he was transferred as vice-prefect for Bilisht.

== World War II and aftermath ==
With the Korca control by the Greek army during Italo-Greek War in 1940, he was one of the first arrested by the Greek military authorities and sent to a prison near Athens. He was released after the German Occupation of Greece and returned to his hometown where he became mayor during 1942–1944.
Kirka joined Balli Kombetar (National Front), and served as member of Balli's District Committee for Korce. He rejected all attempts for bringing him in to the National Liberation Front.
With the triumph of Communist forces in 1944, many Balli elements would be arrested, imprisoned, and even executed. Kirka was arrested in late 1944, but released by an order from Beqir Balluku 12 days later. He would get arrested for the second time on June 12, 1946, this time for good. He was sentenced with 20 years of prison. Kirka died in the Burrel Prison on 28 April 1955.
His home and all belongings got confiscated. His son would get arrested soon-after and be imprisoned. His wife and three daughters would suffer the oppression of the Commumist regime.

As a patriot and contributor of the national cause, he would get rehabilitated later, though he remained somehow forgotten even after 1990. In September 2014, Albanian President Bujar Nishani accredited the medal "Honor of the Nation" to many Vatra personalities, including Kristo Kirka.
