= Albania–United States relations =

- Albania: United States

Diplomatic mission
- Albanian Embassy, Washington, D.C.: United States Embassy, Tirana

Envoy
- Albanian Ambassador to the United States Ervin Bushati: United States Ambassador to Albania Eric Wendt

Albania and the United States formally established diplomatic relations in 1922, a decade after the Albanian Declaration of Independence from the Ottoman Empire. German and Italian occupation of Albania during World War II severed cooperation, and the establishment of an Albanian communist government in 1946 kept diplomacy paused for most of the 20th century. During the fall of communism in Albania and the dissolution of the Soviet Union, the two nations re-established relations in 1991.

The countries are both members of the North Atlantic Treaty Organization (NATO).

== History ==
=== Relations from 1800 to 1939 ===
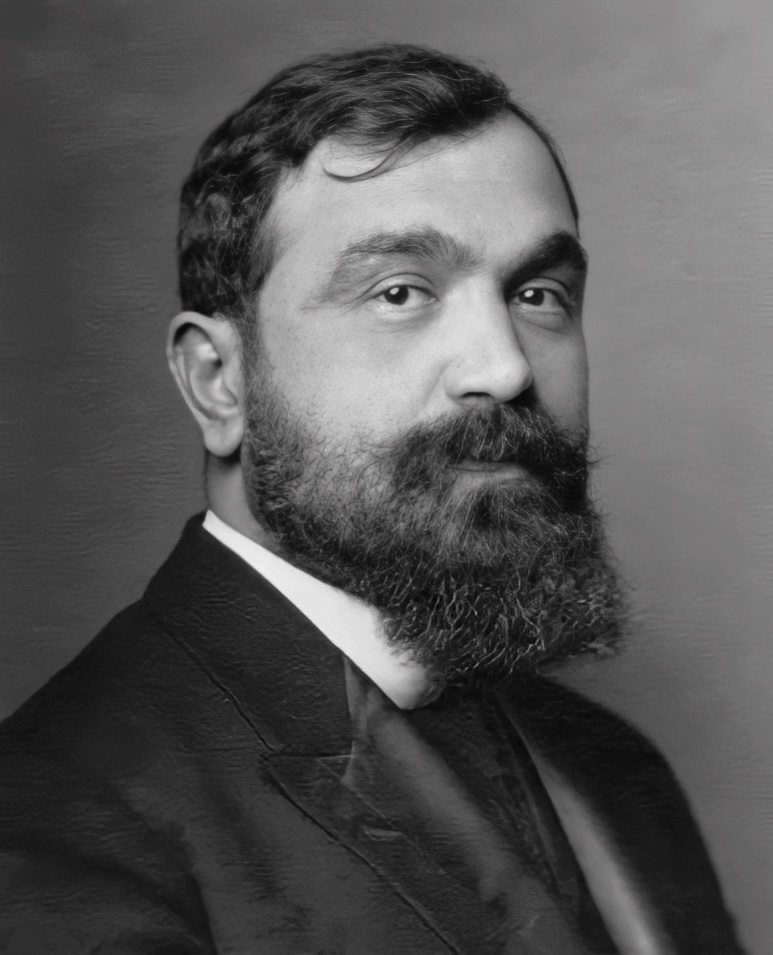
Fan Stilian Noli

Albanian immigrants first arrived in the United States in the mid-19th century, mostly focused in Boston. In Boston, the first Albanian weekly newspaper, Kombi (The Nation) started publication in 1906. The Albanian-American Pan-Albanian Federation of America-Vatra was started in 1912 by Fan S. Noli and was politically active in World War I. Following the war, the Paris Peace Conference (1919–1920) was held and the International community debated the partition of Albania. U.S. President Woodrow Wilson intervened, vetoed the plans and supported Albanian territorial integrity by stating on May 6, 1919 that "Albania ought to be independent."

The Congress of Lushnja, held in January 1920, was a bicameral parliament that appointed members of its own ranks to an upper chamber. There was also an elected lower chamber, which had one deputy for every 12,000 people in Albania, and also one deputy for the large Albanian-American community. The regency council declared: "heartfelt thanks to President Wilson for his defense of the rights of Albanians. They remain convinced that the great American Republic will continue to support their rightful national claims."

The United States supported Albania's current borders, and in December 1920 Albania became a full member of the League of Nations. The United States officially established bilateral diplomatic relations with Albania in 1922, with plans to give concessions to U.S. oil companies. In February 1925 Ahmet Zogu became President of Albania and sent Faik Konica as the Albanian minister to Washington, Konica was the first official representative (his first office was located in the Mayflower Hotel in Washington D.C.) of the Albanian government to the United States. Then, when Ahmet Zogu became King of Albanians in 1928, the American government quietly recognized the political shift. King Zog's government was closely tied with the United States. King Zog opened an office for the Albanian consul general in New York, which was also the Albania representative in the World Fair Organization, as well as a consulate in Boston. From the late 1920s and early 1930s, there were four bilateral treaties and eleven multilateral agreements signed between Albania and the United States.

=== Occupied Albania (1939–1943) ===
The increasing influence of Italy into Albanian politics led to Senator Robert R. Reynolds' visit to Tirana in 1937. But the relations were soon cut short when Italy invaded Albania in April 1939, which drew the criticism of Secretary of State Cordell Hull. The Albanian legation in Washington was officially closed, though Hull continued American support of a liberated Albania. the United States supported a common advance of Albanians against their occupiers, but had little military influence in the Balkans. Allied command denounced the nationalists (Balli Kombetar) as Nazi collaborators and supplied the Communists (National Liberation Movement) with weapons, leading to the Communists gradually gaining complete control over the Albanian resistance. On May 24, 1944 the Albanian National Liberation forces commissioned a conference in Permet, which forbid King Zog reentry to Albania, and also annulled all international treaties signed before occupation.

A joint American-British team known as Military Liaison Albania, coordinated civilian relief in liberated Albania. Enver Hoxha, leader of the Communists, also requested that a military representative be sent to Washington to coordinate military cooperation between the United States and Albania. He also wanted to send a fiscal representative to coordinate assistance from the United States. An American mission was also sent to Albania by the UNRRA.

=== Communist Albania (1944–1992) ===
After the liberation of Albania, American-Albanian relations turned bleak due to Hoxha's insistence that members from Balli Kombetar and Legaliteti be returned for trial; instead the Allied military authorities put them into a camp in Santa Maria di Lucca. Midhat Frasheri, leader of Balli Kombetar, declared Hoxha to be illegitimate and sent a letter that stated that an impartial plebiscite be held "for the regions that belong to us [Albanians] ethnographically, because Albania should not be divided in two for the sake of imperialism and injustice." The initial years of Communist rule however were approved by the American government, as they publicly declared their democratic principles and appreciation of human rights, holding one general election December 2, 1945; which The National Liberation Front won by 97%. However, the Allied Powers eventually did recognize the government of Enver Hoxha on November 10, 1945.

The Albanian government very quickly went into the orbit of the Soviet Union, making it hard for the United States to maintain its own position. Relations further deteriorated when the economic adviser of the U.S. mission, Harry T. Fultz, and employees of the American mission (who Fultz taught), along with the UNRRA's representatives, were charged with sabotage of a draining project in Lake Maliq. The United States considered the situation unacceptable and wanted a withdrawal of the mission, which occurred on November 2, 1946. All in all, the decision to disengage with Albania was in large part due to it not being important to the United States political or economic interests. The U.S. trade balance in the nation was $280,000; while the total assets amounted to $1.3 million.

America turned hostile against the Hoxha regime; it also turned to indirectly support the division of Albania, which gave the Communist government a reasoning for its hostility. After a rather embarrassing incident in 1947, a mutual hostility remained between the two countries, even as Albania moved from Yugoslavian to Soviet to Chinese dominination. On October 5, 1966, the Minister of Foreign Affairs of Austria, Lujo Toncic-Sorinj, explained that Albania wanted to meet with Secretary of State Dean Rusk. Minister Toncic referenced Hoxha's approaches to him, stating that: "Albanians have indicated a desire to move nearer the West but they appear not to dare take any plunge and seem to be afraid of being repulsed by the West." Toncic asked the secretary if he expected any change in Albania's diplomatic position. Rusk speculated that Albanians could become restless under their monopolization by China and indicated "it would be a great mistake for the United States to try to probe the intentions of the Albanians."

While trade was almost nonexistent between the two countries, in 1978 Albanian traders attempted to sell chromium to the United States by using a Swedish trading company as a middleman.

In March 1981, Leka I (the son of King Zog) met with Richard V. Allen in Washington D.C. and requested aid from the USA and Saudi Arabia to launch a rebellion against the Hoxha regime. This was rejected by William L. Stearman on the grounds that Albania was not able to deny NATO forces entry to the Adriatic sea, that it could ruins Albania's potential for rapprochement with the west, that it could provoke unrest among Albanians in Kosovo against Yugoslavia, turn people against the USA generally, use a favor with Saudi Arabia that could be better used elsewhere and would probably fail as a rebellion. The US feared that after Hoxha Albania might become unstable, leading to a Soviet or Yugoslav intervention.

In a document outlining US policy towards Albania under Reagan, the main objective listed was to "maximize Western influence over Albania so as to keep it as free as possible from Soviet exploitation." Strategies outlined included Radio Free Asia and Voice of America broadcasts in Albanian, establishment of a US Information Office in Kosovo and US allies such as Greece, Turkey, Italy, France and Japan strengthening their ties with Albania. A CIA analysis from 1988 indicated that the primary concern of the USA in Albania was potential rapprochement with the Soviet Union.

Relations with the west began to thaw after Hoxha's death in 1985, but the Communist government was still in power. Ties between the two nations were reestablished in 1990 when the first contacts were reestablished. Albania returned to warm relations with the United States, especially after Secretary of State James Baker visited Albania in 1991. The United States was also important in the landslide victory of Sali Berisha in the 1992 elections, ending the last Communist dominated country in Europe.

=== Post-Communist Albania (1992–1997) ===
Prior to the special elections of 1992, the main opposition leader, Sali Berisha, visited the United States twice and was able to receive the full support of the U.S. government and various Congressional leaders. Understanding the challenges to democratization, the United States publicly supported the opposition parties in Albania. The U.S. support proved to be of critical importance for the landslide victory of the opposition in the March 22 elections. On April 9, 1992, the new Albanian Parliament elected Berisha as president of the republic, Albania's first noncommunist president since the end of World War II.

The new government created after the election of 1992 introduced an ambitious, Western-oriented program of much-needed economic and democratic reforms to overcome Albania's longtime isolation and economic stagnation.

The cooperation continued in major fields like economy, defense, and agricultural aid.

=== Modern Albania (1997–present) ===
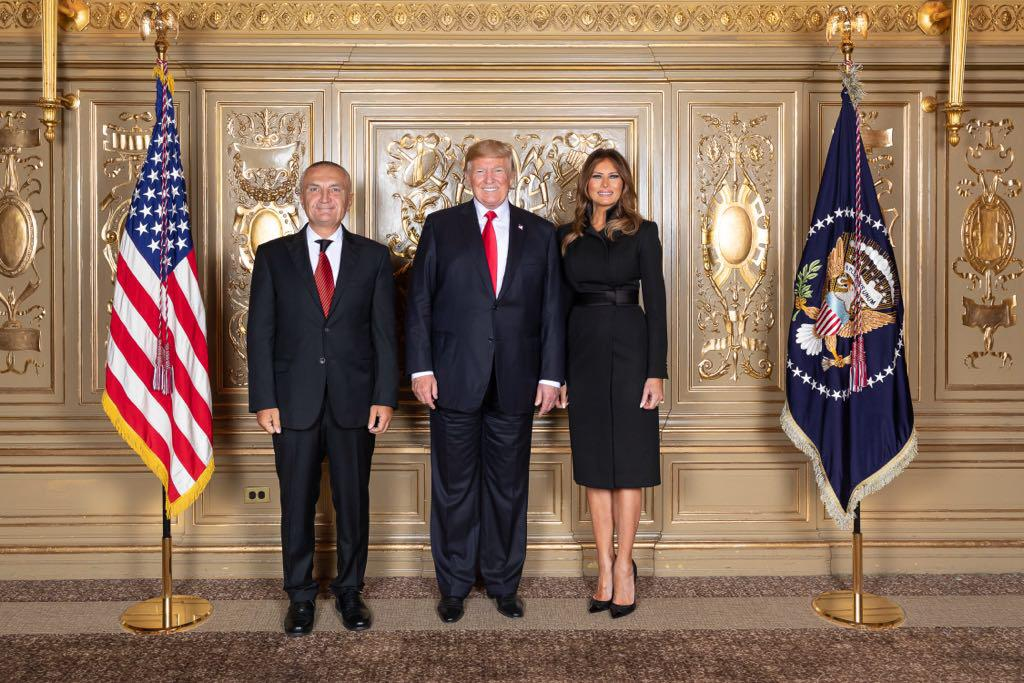
President Donald Trump meeting with President Ilir Meta at the United Nations General Assembly (2018)

In the 1990s, Greece, Albania's southern neighbour, viewed U.S. engagement in the area as anti-Greek and pro-Albanian, in addition to being pro-Muslim. Albania supported the 1999 NATO bombing of Yugoslavia.

President George W. Bush visited Albania on June 10, 2007 as part of his tour of Europe, making him the first U.S. President to do so. A street in the capital was renamed after Bush. A statue of Bush was erected in the town of Fushë-Krujë in July 2011. U.S. President George W. Bush approved the NATO membership of Albania and Croatia in October 2008. In contemporary Albania, the U.S. is regarded favourably as a longstanding ally since the conclusion of the First World War.

In late February 2022, Albania and the U.S. tabled a co-written resolution condemning the Russian invasion of Ukraine at the 15 member UN Security Council, but failed to pass as Russia vetoed it. At the UN Security Council, Albania cosponsored a resolution with the U.S. for an emergency General Assembly session to be held regarding the invasion of Ukraine. As it was a procedural vote, Russia's opposition did not effect the outcome and the resolution passed.

== Embassies and consulates ==
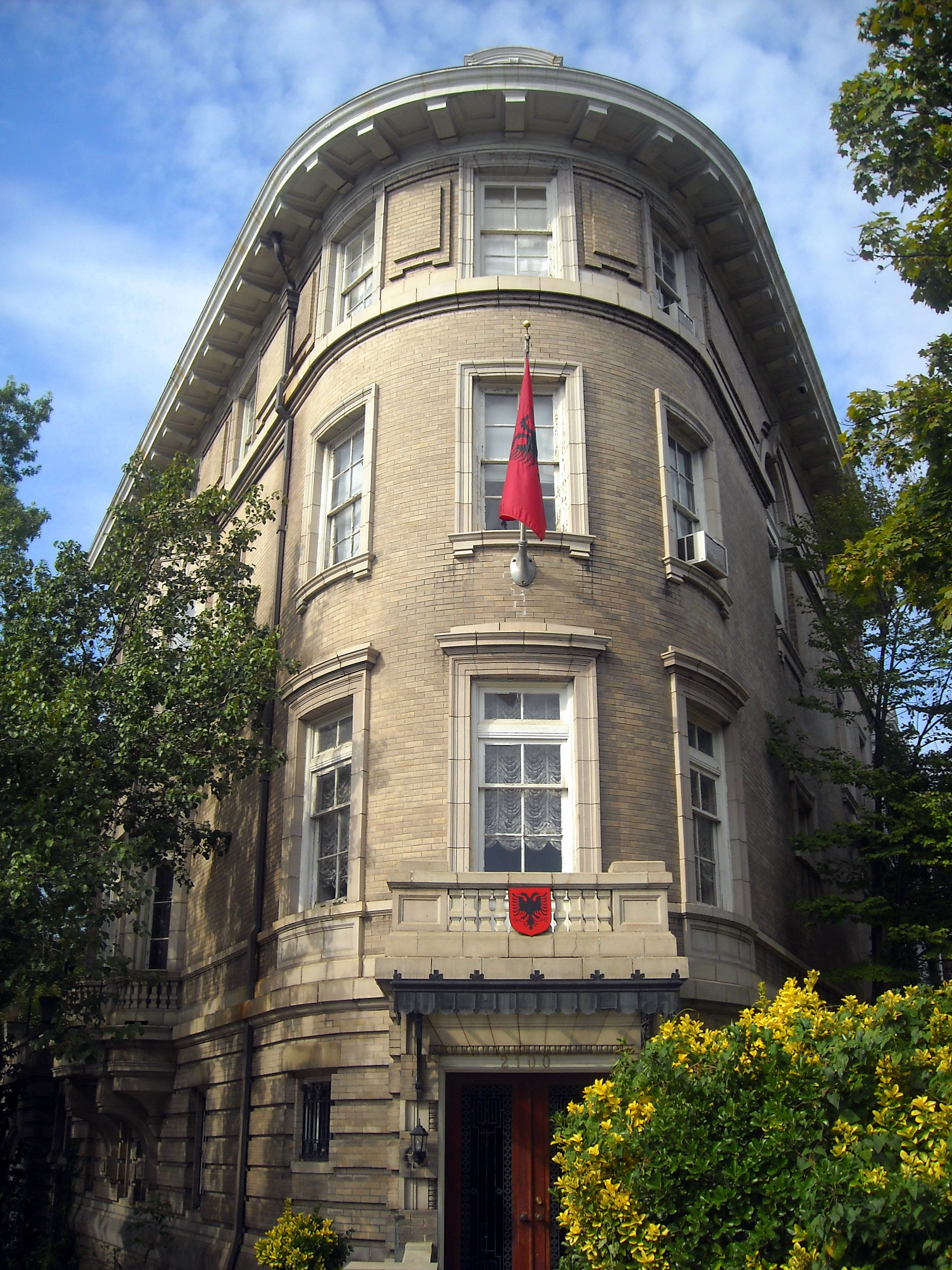
The Albanian embassy in Washington, D.C.

Albania maintains an embassy in the American capital of Washington, D.C., while the United States maintains an embassy in Albania's capital city Tirana. Since 2015 Albania's ambassador to the United States has been Mrs. Floreta Faber. Albania also has a consulate in New York City because of the Albanian diaspora in the U.S.

== Public sentiment ==
Pro-American sentiment is strong and widespread among the Albanian population.

Even while the United States, which had closed its mission to Albania in 1946, was being vilified by communist propaganda during the regime of Enver Hoxha, ordinary Albanians remembered that U.S. President Woodrow Wilson had interceded on behalf of Albanian independence from 1919 to 1920, strongly arguing against a proposed partition of Albania by the Paris Peace Conference and subsequently enabling Albania to achieve statehood and international recognition by the League of Nations. Many Albanian children to this day are named Vilson in the president's honor. Albanians also credit the Clinton Administration with saving Kosovar-Albanian lives in the Kosovo war, and acknowledged the U.S. government's commitment to resolving the political status of Kosovo.

According to the 2012 U.S. Global Leadership Report, 80% of Albanians approve of U.S. leadership, the second-highest rating for any surveyed country in Europe after the partially recognized Kosovo. This nevertheless makes the Albanian people in general have an overwhelmingly positive view of the U.S.A, more than any other people group in the world, as Kosovo is also ethnically Albanian.

As of 2013, there were 649 international students of Albanian origin studying in the United States.

== Treaties ==
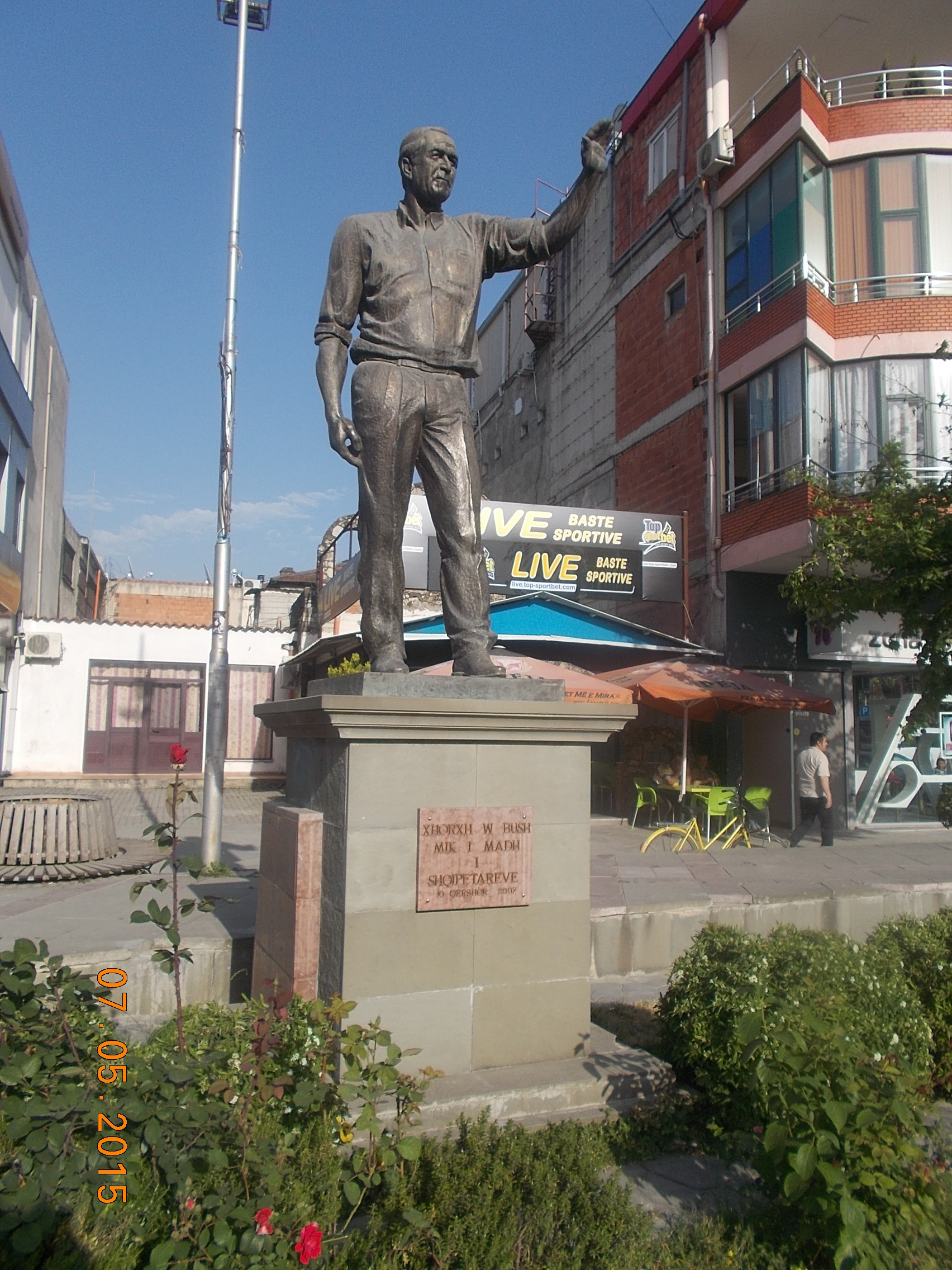
A statue of George W. Bush was erected at Fushë-Krujë after his visit

In 2003, Albania and the U.S. signed and ratified a number of agreements, including a treaty on the prevention of proliferation of weapons of mass destruction and the promotion of defense and military relations; the Adriatic Charter; and an agreement regarding the non-surrender of persons to the International Criminal Court. The U.S. strongly supported Albania's European Union and NATO membership goals. Working towards NATO membership, the U.S. and Albania signed a Supplementary Agreement to the Partnership for Peace Status of Forces Agreement, an important step in strengthening bilateral cooperation and enhancing security, peace, and stability in the region. In April 2008, NATO invited Albania to join the alliance, and in October 2008, U.S. President George W. Bush signed Albania NATO protocols, saying, "The people of Albania and Croatia are helping move the world closer to a great triumph of history — a Europe that is whole, a Europe that is free and a Europe that is at peace." Albania joined NATO in 2009 along with Croatia, further strengthening Albanian–American relations.

Albania is eligible to export certain products duty-free to the United States under the Generalized System of Preferences program. The United States and Albania have signed a bilateral investment treaty.

== Developmental aid ==
The first American donations in current Albanian land date back to the 1890s, when Albania was still part of the Ottoman Empire. The protestant family Qirjazi, most notably the sisters Sevasti Qiriazi, Parashqevi and their brothers Gjerasim Qiriazi and Gjergj Qiriazi, had opened the first girls' school in Albanian language, in Korçë. After getting threatened by Turkish and Greek officials, the family demanded financial aid from American Protestant philanthropist groups. On March 26, 1908, the American Protestant charities arrived in Korçë; Phineas Barbour Kennedy and his wife Violet R. Kennedy, daughter of the Protestant missionary Luis Bond. Therefore, the school remained opened with American financial and defensive aid until 1939.

In the 1920s, the two first technical and vocational schools in Albania were founded with American support: The Harry Fultz Institute in Tirana was built with financial support from the American Red Cross in 1921, in 1925 the "Albanian-American Schools of Agriculture" in Golem, Kavajë was founded by Charles Telford Erickson with support from the State Department and the American Embassy in Tirana.

Since fiscal year 1991, the U.S. has provided Albania with more than $616 million in assistance, not counting Foreign Agricultural Service food aid. In 2007, the U.S. gave over $21.1 million to Albania under the Support for East European Democracy Act program. Albania was among the countries selected to participate in the Threshold Program under the Millennium Challenge Account, receiving a grant of $13.8 million. In September 2006, Albania began implementation of the program, which targets corruption and rule of law.

== Arms trade ==
The United States sold $144,984,841 worth of weapons to Albania between 1950 and 2020. In 2020 alone, Albania purchased American arms worth $42,284,081, representing one third of the country's total historical purchases from the United States.

== Global war on terrorism ==
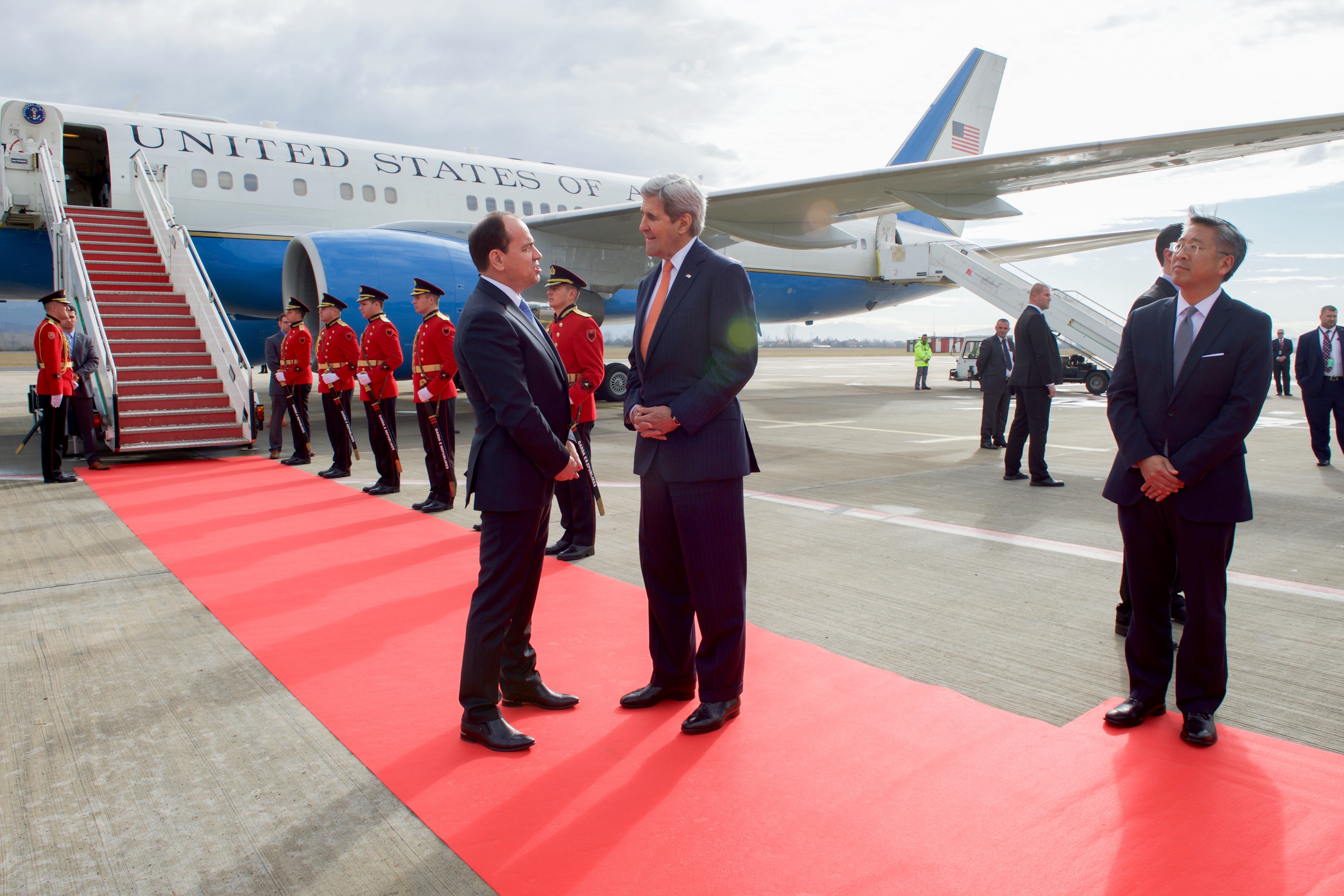
President Nishani meets with John Kerry during his official visit in Tirana, February 14, 2016

Albania has supported the U.S. in the global Global War on Terrorism by freezing terrorist assets, shutting down non-governmental organizations (NGOs) with possible links to terrorist financing, expelling extremists, and providing military and diplomatic support for the U.S.-led actions in Afghanistan and Iraq. Albania has played a moderating role in the region and has fully supported UN mediation efforts in Kosovo. Albania also has 600 elite soldiers deployed in Afghanistan as part of the International Security Assistance Force, and 240 troops as part of Multi-National Force – Iraq.

=== Death of Osama bin Laden ===
The President of the Republic, Prof. Dr. Bamir Topi, through a message conveyed to U.S. President Barack Obama, commended the elimination of Osama bin Laden, considering it as one of the greatest victories in the war against international terrorism.

Please allow me to congratulate you on the completion of the mission justice restored, with the final elimination of Osama Bin Laden by American troops, thus achieving one of the most important victories in the long and difficult war against international terrorism! As President of the Republic of Albania, on behalf of the Albanian nation, I would like to express my most sincere congratulations for the achievement of this objective that gave me joy and at the same time made me proud that my country is lined up on the side of the greatest ally and friend of Albania; the United States of America, the country that believed in the war without compromise against evil, against terrorism, by defending the holy principles of freedom and democracy all over the world, as well as ensuring the security, peace and stability in all parts of the world. Allow me, Mr. President, on behalf of the Albanian people and me personally, to express to You once more the best wishes for this great victory and at the same time to ensure you that Albania will continue to complete with devotion its engagements in the framework of NATO, by giving its own contribution in the future challenges for freedom, democracy, as well as in constructing a better world for the nations and their future

— Bamir Topi,

Prime Minister Sali Berisha reacted to the Al-Qaeda leader being killed by the U.S. forces in Pakistan by noting it as a great victory of the U.S. over terrorism. Speaking to reporters, Berisha said that Bin Laden got what he deserved and emphasized that his death relieves the pain of thousands of September 11 victims. Berisha said:

Today's headline of the international news is elimination of one of the blackest figures of the history of mankind. It's the death of the man who by his primitiveness and aggressive behavior took the lives of thousands of people in New York, but even in other countries worldwide; they were innocent people, on whom this cruel man, Bin Laden, wanted to realize his medieval and the most inhuman ends. But, now he got the deserved response while hidden in his den for years. This marks a great victory of the United States of America, President Barack Obama; it's the victory of peace and all those who consider terrorism the number one enemy of peace and their freedom. This is the most consoling news for families of thousands of innocent victims of the attacks that the chief terrorist Osama Bin Laden masterminded in many countries of the world.

— Sali Berisha,

The Ministry of Foreign Affairs of the Republic of Albania hailed the death of Osama bin Laden, saying:

On this day, the Albanian people joins the feelings and the solidarity of the peoples of the whole world, who have suffered from the unparalleled acts perpetrated by international terrorism, including the one on September 11. As one of the first countries to join the alliance against international terrorism, Albania expresses the confidence that the unwavering stance in encountering these terrorist acts and their masterminds is the key to the success of our common struggle to uphold peace and freedom worldwide.

— Ministry of Foreign Affairs of the Republic of Albania,

=== Libyan civil war ===
Prime Minister Sali Berisha supported the 2011 military intervention in Libya the decision of the coalition to protect civilians from the Libyan regime of Gaddafi. In a press release of the Prime Ministry, Berisha noted that these operations are considered entirely legitimate, having as main objective the protection of freedoms and universal rights that Libyans deserve adding that Albania is ready to help.

=== Syrian civil war ===
During a 2012 meeting with the new ambassador of Qatar in Albania, Prime Minister Sali Berisha said: "The government of Albania is following with concern the events in Syria where the regime of Bashar al-Assad is using its power as a permit to kill the innocent civilians and the Syrian people." The Ministry of Foreign Affairs of Albania on February 18, 2012 strongly condemns the violence already spread throughout Syria, "as well as increasing the number of victims caused by the government of Bashar Al Assad on the innocent population of his country". The Ministry of Foreign Affairs supports the conclusions of the meeting of the Foreign Ministers of the European Union, held on February 27 in Brussels, on developments in Syria, as well as the additional sanctions that the European Union has adapted against the Assad government, sanctions that aim to paralyze the apparatus and finances of the repressive machine against the Syrian people. The Albanian Foreign Ministry expresses sympathy and support for the progressive forces, which have embraced the aspiration to transform Syria into a democratic, open and pluralistic state, which respects the rights of all communities living in this country. By coordinating its contributions to those of the international community, the Republic of Albania joins the Friends of Syria Group, believing that this is the secure way to help the Syrian people.

During the meeting on April 1, 2012 Friends of Syria in Istanbul the Minister of foreign Affairs of the Republic of Albania, Edmond Haxhinasto too spoke in the meeting, emphasizing that the issue of human rights is not an internal affair belonging to the states, but a responsibility of all the international community. He expressed the need to intensify the pressure against the current government of Damascus not just politically, but also through a concentrated action of all international mechanisms. Haxhinasto stressed the position of the Albanian government to support the efforts of the U.N., the E.U., the Arab League and other international bodies in putting an end to the violence towards the civilian population from the Damascus government, and establishing the conditions for a democratic process. He praised the Mission of the UN Special Envoy, Mr. Kofi Annan and his plan to stop the bloodshed and violence, achieve national reconciliation and establish a democratic government in Syria. In conclusion, Minister Haxhinasto underlined the support of the Albanian Government for the Syrian democratic opposition represented by the Syrian National Council, as well as its war for freedom, human dignity and progress.

=== Military intervention against ISIL ===
Albania has supported U.S. counter terrorism efforts and has contributed to the Global Coalition to Counter ISIL by freezing terrorist assets, shutting down non-governmental organizations with possible links to terrorist financing, and expelling extremists.

Albania was amongst the coalition of seven countries, led by the United States, which donated weapons to Kurdish militia Peshmerga, for their fight against ISIL.

== See also ==
- Albanian Americans
- United States Ambassador to Albania
- Foreign relations of the United States
- Foreign relations of Albania
