= Gilbert Galanxhi =

Albanian diplomat (born 1962)

Ambassador of Albania to the United States
- In office 23 February 2011 – December 2014
- President: Bamir Topi (at appointment); Bujar Nishani (during tenure)
- Preceded by: Agim Nesho
- Succeeded by: Floreta Faber

Personal details
- Born: July 28, 1962 (age 64) Tirana, PR Albania
- Children: 2
- Education: University of Tirana; Swiss International Relations Institute, Geneva; Foreign Service Institute, Washington, D.C.
- Occupation: Diplomat

Gilbert Galanxhi (born July 28, 1962) is an Albanian diplomat who served as the Ambassador Extraordinary and Plenipotentiary of the Republic of Albania to the United States of America until 2015. He is married and he and his wife have two children, a daughter and a son.

== Background ==
Galanxhi grew up under the Communist regime of Prime Minister and community leader Enver Hoxha which lasted from 1944 until 1985. Nine years later, Galanxhi joined the Foreign Service of Albania.

Galanxhi attended and graduated from Tirana University, Faculty of History and Philology, the English Language and Literature Department. By the time that he was part of the Ministry of Foreign Affairs of Albania, he attended the Swiss International Relations Institute of Geneva, Switzerland, where he graduated in 1994. Finally, he graduated from the Foreign Service Institute of the State Department in Washington, D.C. in 1995.

In 1994, Galanxhi became a member of the Foreign Service of Albania. At this time, he held the positions of the Head of Press and Information Department, and was also the Spokesman of the Foreign Affairs Ministry. Three years later, he received the position of Chargé d'affaires, to represent Albania in Buenos Aires, Argentina. Two years later, in 1999, the Kosovo conflict broke out. During this time, Galanxhi worked for the United Nations High Commissioner for Refugees. in Tirana. He served as the Coordinator between the Albanian Government and the international organizations posted in the country at the time.

Then, in 2000, Galanxhi began working for the European Union Police Assistance Missions in Tirana, Albania. At first he worked with the training unit, and then he was appointed to Chief of Cabinet until 2007, when he re-joined the diplomatic service of Albania. That year he was posted to Vienna, Austria. In Vienna, Galanxhi represented Albania as the Ambassador to the United Nations Office in Vienna (UNOV), as well as to the Organization for Security and Cooperation in Europe (OSCE). Galanxhi remained in this position until he was offered the prestigious position of the Ambassador of Albania to the United States of America in December 2010. Galanxhi accepted this position, moved to Washington, DC and bestowed his Letter of Credence on February 23, 2011 to President Barack Obama. He served in this post until December 2014, the time when he was transferred to Tirana, to become the Director of Cabinet of the Prosecutor General of Albania. From 2016 and onwards, Galanxhi is part of the academia, serving as a University Lecturer in different public and private universities in Tirana. Currently, Ambassador Galanxhi works at Barleti University, as well as he is the Executive Director of the Albanian Institute of Public Affairs, an Institute which operates under the umbrella of Barleti University.

== Achievements ==
Thus far, Galanxhi has helped Albania and the United States support each other simultaneously. He worked alongside Paige Alexander, the Assistant Administrator for Europe and Eurasia, and President Michael Granoff to continue with the efforts of an initial grant of $30 million presented by the USAID to Albania in 1995 to help with their economic transition after the collapse of the Soviet Union. With the help of the Albanian-American Enterprise Fund, a private sector of development has risen in Albania. This fund has created over 3,500 jobs in the country, and has contributed about $725 million to the Gross Domestic Product. At the same time, $15 million was returned to the US Treasury due to these efforts. Additionally, Galanxhi took part in the Israel Project alongside ambassadors from 18 other countries.
