= Kostë Çekrezi =

Albanian historian and publicist

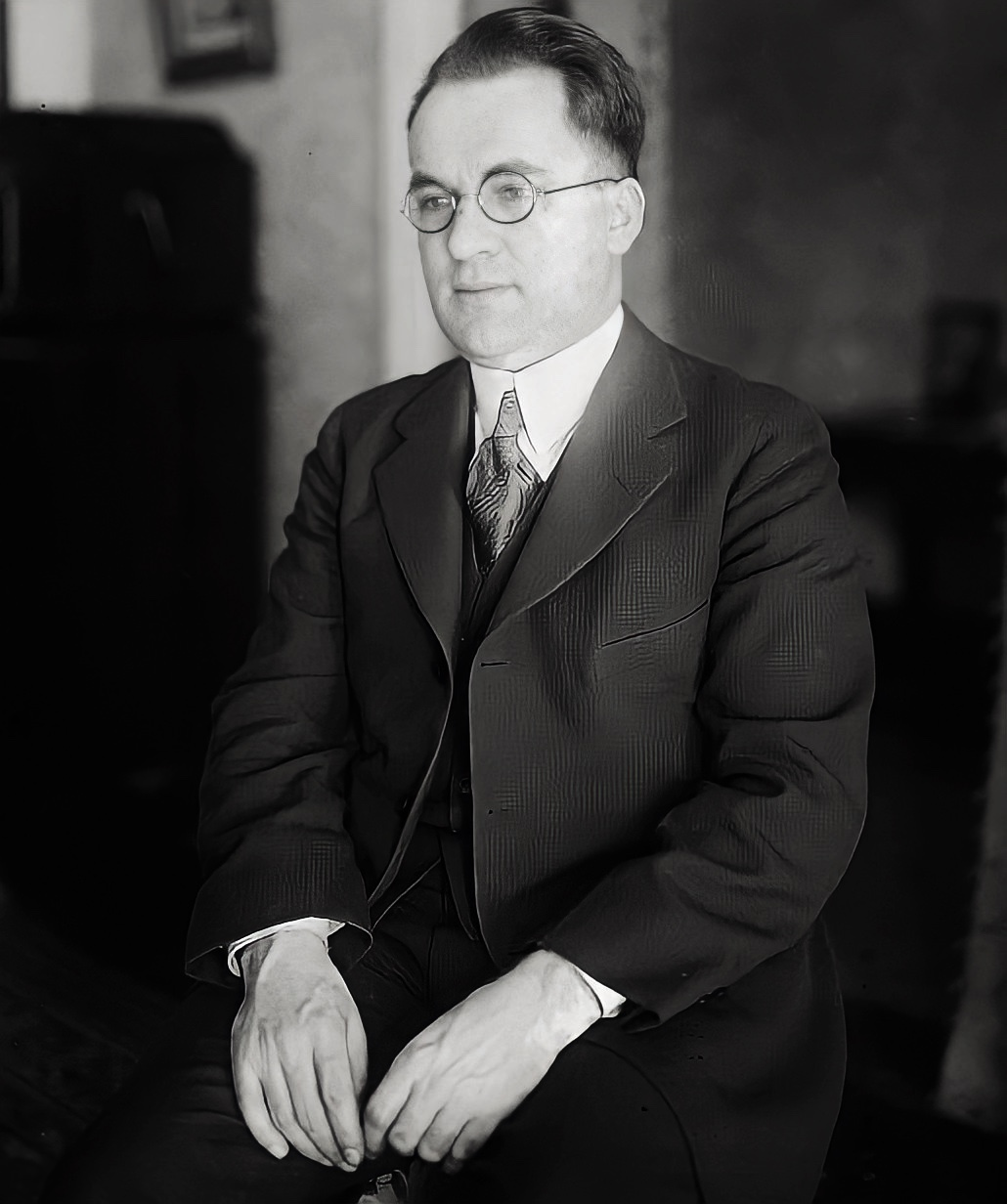
- Born: March 31, 1892; Ziçisht, Ottoman Empire (modern Albania)
- Died: January 10, 1959 (aged 66); Boston, MA, United States
- Other names: Constantin Anastas Chekrezi; Kostandin Çekrezi
- Known for: The Adriatic Review; Vatra Federation; Illyria Magazine

Kostë Çekrezi (31 March 1892 – 10 January 1959), also known as Constantin Anastas Chekrezi (Albanian: Kostandin Çekrezi) was an Albanian patriot, historian, and publicist.

== Biography ==
Çekrezi was born on 31 March 1892 in Ziçisht village, in the Upper Devoll region located near Korçë, Ottoman Empire. He himself and his fathers family are of Circassian heritage which can be seen by his surname Çekrezi, which over time they became assimilated into Albanians. After finishing a five-year school in his native village, he finished at the Greek high school in the town of Korça on June 12, 1910. The school documents show he was an "excellent student in all subjects", and he earned a scholarship from the Ottoman government to attend (where he stayed for a year only till 1912) the law school in Thessaloniki, now Greece. The studies were interrupted by the start of the First World War. After the Albanian Declaration of Independence until 1914 Çekrezi lived in Vlorë where he worked as a secretary in the Civil Court of the town, later as an interpreter for the International Control Commission assigned near Ismail Qemali's government and later Prince Wied.

When the First World War started, Çekrezi emigrated to the United States via Italy. At age 23 Çekrezi became editor of the newspaper "The Sun" (Albanian: Dielli), in Boston, being chief editor of the newspaper from 1915 to 1919. He also published a monthly magazine called Illyria, and contributed to Vatra's monthly publication The Adriatic Review, where he emphasized the atrocities against Albanians during the First World War. Meanwhile, besides being fluent in multiple languages, he studied economics, public administration, and English language at Harvard University. He graduated on 17 June 1918, with a Bachelor of Arts degree.
Constantine also translated into Albanian, a short history of Albania, written by Frederick Gibert, which was published in Boston, and wrote a historical study named "Albania, past and present", published in 1919 in New York City which was translated and published in Albania only in 2012 during the 100th anniversary of Declaration of Independence.

For two years he was a professor of history at Columbia University. According to Elsie he briefly returned to Albania in 1920 to participate in the Congress of Lushnje. In the years 1922–1932, he was the accredited representative of the Albanian Government (coming out of the Congress of Lushnje), with the title "Albanian Commissioner in Washington", also a member of the National Press Club in the U.S. In 1923, his English-Albanian dictionary came out.

After returning in Albania in 1925, he came into sharp conflict with King Zog, specifically to some concessions made in favor of the Italian-Albanian banks newly positioned as part of Zog's affiliation with Italy. After the first meeting with Ahmet Zagolli, he criticized Albanian political relations with Belgrade as well. In 1929, he served as member of the first Council of State (Albanian: Këshilli i Shtetit), established on April 11 of that year. In following years he was an impressive publicist, and editor of the newspapers Telegraf ("Telegraph") and Ora ("Watch"), where he was pushed to publish some pro-monarchy articles, but immediately after the announcement of the monarchy, Kostë Çekrezi was arrested by direct orders of Koço Kota and sentenced to one year imprisonment. His newspapers, "Telegraf" and "Ora" were shut down permanently.

After being an active leader and participant of the Fier uprising of 1935, he had to flee Albania to Italy together with his friends Musa Kranja and Xhevahir Arapi on an Italian fishing boat. They reached Monopoli and were transferred to a prison in Bari for three months. There, Çekrezi would write to Mussolini asking for his release. After three months they were released and gained the right of Political Asylum. Meanwhile, in Albania, he was sentenced to death in absentia. While trying to form the Organization of Albanian Emigrants (Albanian: Organizata e Shqiptarëve në Emigracion), Çekrezi was arrested by the French government and, surprisingly, placed into the concentration camp of Vernet d' Ariege in France until 27 October 1941. It is not clear why he was placed there and how he escaped from it. After that, he left for America.

It was 28 December 1941 when Çekrezi together with Tajar Zavalani formed in Boston the "Free Albania" (Albanian: Shqipëria e Lirë) organization, trying to act like an Albanian Government in exile, possibly with established connections with Office of Strategic Services, and similarly to what Vatra somehow had functioned during World War I. He gave up this organization in 1945.
Costa Chekrezi has made efforts to maintain bridges between the Allies and Albania. In 1946, he was the one to receive a delegation headed by Tuk Jakova in the New Yorker Hotel, and the second meeting with Mihal Prifti, where Costa suggested that the Albanian government should find the way to connect with the Western powers, especially the USA, and abolish the "friendly" relations with Yugoslavia of Tito, drawing parallels with King Zog-Nikola Pašić agreements. In the autumn of 1950, he hosted a meeting with Albanian representatives Behar Shtylla and Vilson Progri at the Governor Clinton Hotel.

In 1951, he published the political analysis "The third plan for partitioning Albania" in Washington D.C.

Kostë Çekrezi, was overshadowed for half a century by the communist regime; he died near Boston, on 10 January 1959, at the age of 66. At his funeral, Fan Noli described him as a "statesman, who had struggled all his life for his nation, and a great Albanian guy who had to die poor".

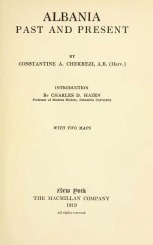
"Albania past and present" - 1919

== Work ==
- Letra shkresa fialetore ("Literary letters and writings") (1917), Boston
- Albania and the Balkans (1917),
- Albania past and present (1919), New York : The Macmillan company
- Këndime për rjeshten e funtme te shkollave filltare ("Reading, for the last grade of elementary schools") (1921), Boston
- Histori e Shqipërisë ("History of Albania") (1921), Boston
- Histori e vjetër që në kohërat e Pellazgëve gjer në rrënien e Perandorisë Romane ("Ancient history from the Pelasgian times till the fall of Roman Empire") (1921), Boston
- Histori e re e Evropës ("New European history") (1921), Boston
- Historia mesjetare e Evropës që në rënien e Romës gjer në rënien e Kostantinopojës ("Medieval history of Europe from the fall of Rome till the fall of Constantinople") (478-1453) (1921), Boston 1921
- Chekrezi's English-Albanian dictionary (Albanian: Fjalor inglisht-shqip i Çekrezit) (1923), Boston
- The third plan for partitioning Albania (Albanian: Plani i tretë per copëtimin e Shqipërisë) (1951), Washington D.C.

== See also ==
- Albanian Kingdom
- Albanian Subversion
- List of Albanian Americans
- Vatra, the Pan-Albanian Federation of America
