= Harry Fultz =

American educationist (1888–1980)

- Born: December 29, 1888; Salem, Indiana
- Died: December 30, 1980 (aged 92); Seymour, Indiana

Harry Trevlin Fultz (December 29, 1888 – December 30, 1980) was an American teacher who contributed to the development of education in Albania in the period between the two world wars.

== Early life and education ==
Harry T. Fultz was born on December 29, 1888, in Salem, Indiana. First, he graduated from Wabash College in Crawfordsville, Indiana, and then continued his studies at Amarou Technological University in the field of mechanics.

== Career ==
Until 1922, he worked as a lecturer in several educational institutions in America. During this period, he also served in the army for a short time (1917–1919).

In 1922, the American Red Cross appointed Fultz as the professor of mechanical arts and Director of the Technical School in Tirana. The Technical School, through his work, attracted the attention of the opinions of the time as a school of high quality. He took the first steps of pragmatist pedagogy in Albania according to the "laboratory school" model and the pedagogical principle "Learning by doing", which he was the first to implement. He brought to Albania the tradition of the best American school experience, implemented new teaching and learning methods, and implemented dozens of projects for the preparation and formation of new technicians.

Fultz was an outstanding teacher, known for his scientific and special organizational skills. He left a deep impact on Albanian education and became a model for future generations. His mission ended in 1933, but the message he left behind was: "Try to make the country worth living in!"

During World War II, he worked for four years at the U.S. State Department and other U.S. government agencies. From May 1945 to November 1946, he worked at the U.S. diplomatic mission in Tirana and at the American embassy in Rome until the spring of 1947.

In the spring of 1947, he was appointed Director of the International Center, a residence primarily for foreign students at the University of Chicago, and remained in this post until his retirement in 1962. During those years, he also served as secretary of the Pan American Board of Education (1947–1962).

He died on 30 December 1980 in Seymour, Indiana.

== Lines to Illyria ==
In his poetic work "Lines to Illyria" written with his daughter Joana Fultz Kontos during their stay in Tirana, in 1946, but published in 1950 in New York, Fultz recorded his memories by dedicating some poems to Illyria. According to Professor Zef Nekaj, beyond poetic taste, Fultz portrays the antiquity and ruggedness of the land that inspires him. The evaluation of the poetic work "Lines to Illyria", suggests that Fultz devoted over a decade of effort and momentum to Albania. He expresses his anxiety about the situation of the Albanians at that time, their achievements and failures, and the noble complaint of a progressive man's fiery heart, eager to do as much as possible for the Albanian people.

== See also ==
- Harry Fultz Institute
