= American Chamber of Commerce to the European Union =

The American Chamber of Commerce to the European Union (AmCham EU) is a Belgium-based committee of companies that lobbies in the European Union for US companies and companies with US business ties. It is a member of Amchams in Europe (ACE), an umbrella organization of related committees.

== History ==
The American Chamber of Commerce to the European Union was founded as part of the American Chamber of Commerce to Belgium. Starting off in the form of the ‘Common Market Panel’ in the early 1960s, the organization evolved over the years first to the ‘EEC Committee’ in 1978, then to the ‘EU Committee’ in 1995. The EU Committee changed its name to AmCham EU in 2003 and became an independent organization on January 1, 2004.

== Structure ==
AmCham EU's committee is composed of 160 member companies, mostly based in the United States. Some notable members include 3M, Amazon and Disney.

The committee also has a staff that works on behalf of their member companies. The CEO is Susan Danger. Through ACE, it is affiliated with the US Chamber of Commerce.

== Lobbying ==
The committee publishes position statements, research papers, newsletters and social media content that are distributed in Brussels and throughout Europe. It also meets with representatives in Brussels and presidencies around the EU in its channel driven groups through conferences and consultations.

=== Activities ===
AmCham EU was the 8th most active corporate lobby association between 2014 and 2019. It was identified as "provid(ing) us the opportunity to engage various EU directorates" by Phillip Morris in 1998. It lobbied against plain packaging for cigarettes in 2010. It supported green policy like the European Green Deal in its 2021 annual report and the Farm to Fork Strategy in a position paper. However, it has been described as hypocritical in its stances on green issues by various green organizations like DeSmog and Friends of the Earth Europe. It supported less restrictions on foreign buyers of EU companies. It also supported the reducing of the severity of regulations in China.

=== Finances ===
AmCham EU does not disclose funding on its website. It spent 1.25 to 1.5 million dollars on lobbying costs in 2023.

== Recognition ==
AmCham EU has been described as "the most effective lobbying force" in Brussels by The Economist. It has been credited as being a major lobbyist for American corporations in Europe. It has also been credited with the Americanization of lobbying in Europe.

== See also ==
- Chamber of Commerce
- European American
- United States Chamber of Commerce
