= Harry Fultz Institute =

Technical high school in Tirana, Albania

- Instituti "Harry T. Fultz"

Location
- Tirana, Albania
- Coordinates: 41°20′07″N 19°48′33″E

Information
- Type: High school
- Established: 1921; 105 years ago
- Founder: American Red Cross Youth Corps

The Harry T. Fultz Institute (Albanian: Instituti "Harry T. Fultz") is a vocational high school in Tirana, Albania.

== History ==
The school was founded in 1921, when the American Red Cross Youth Corps founded the Albanian Vocational School, which was Albania's first and for a long time only such institution. From 1921 until 1933 it was financed by the American Junior Red Cross, small grants from the Albanian government and income from own commercial activities. It provided its students with both classroom instructions and practical experience. It operated a commercial printing press, an electric power station, a farm and an ice plant. It undertook several construction projects, among them the building of the American Legation in Tirana. Several of its graduates were admitted to reputable American and European Universities. Later, it would be renamed the Tirana Technical School, eventually being named after Harry Trevlin Fultz, the Chicago native who replaced Louis Mann Heron as the school's principal in 1922. He encouraged his students to ″strive to make Albania a country worth living for and, if necessary, worth dying for″. He remained in the post until 1933, when the government of King Zog I of Albania nationalized all foreign schools in the country.

In 1947, the school was renamed November 7th Polytechnic but continued to fulfill its mission, adding internships and extracurricular activities to its portfolio. In 1992, the Harry Fultz Albanian-American Foundation headed by its president, Joan Fultz Kontos, rededicated the school.
