= Floreta Faber =

Albanian ambassador to the United States

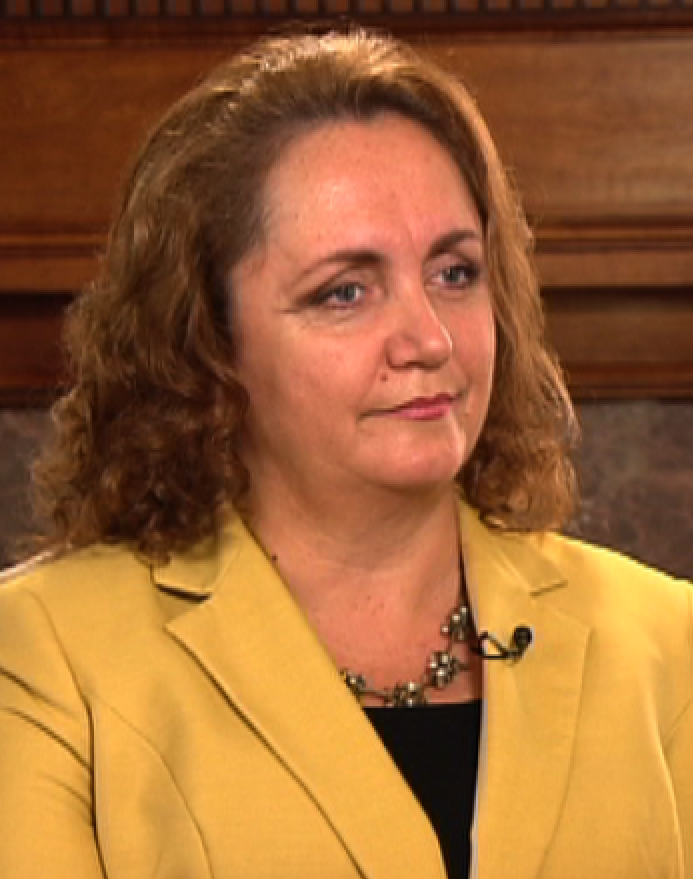
- Faber in 2016

Albanian Ambassador to the United States, Mexico, Dominican Republic, and Panama
- In office January 30, 2015 – July 24, 2023
- President: Bujar Nishani
- Prime Minister: Edi Rama
- Preceded by: Gilbert Galanxhi

Personal details
- Born: March 19, 1968 (age 58) Shkodër, PR Albania
- Spouse: Dr. Edmond Faber
- Education: Tirana University; Norwegian School of Management

Floreta Faber (born 19 March 1968) is an Albanian economist who served as the Albanian Ambassador to the United States, Mexico, the Dominican Republic, and Panama from January 2015 to July 2023.

== Education ==
Faber is a graduate of Tirana University, Faculty of Economics, in the Sphere of Circulation in 1990; from 1993 to 1995, she was enrolled in a two-year Master of Science Program for International Marketing & Strategy at the Norwegian School of Management in Oslo, Norway, including a period of studying as an exchange student at Washington State University.

Her Masters Diploma in Marketing and Operational Management was awarded by MB University, in Albania. She has completed executive programs and training, such as International Visitor Leadership Program of the Department of States and Harvard University.

== Career ==
From 1990 to 1993, Faber worked in Shkodër at various organizations, including a local chamber of commerce, a regional business agency, and a public import-export company.

From 1995 to 2000, Faber worked at Deloitte & Touche in Tirana, Albania, and in Prague, Czech Republic. She helped open the Deloitte & Touche office in Tirana and worked in several positions.

After Deloitte & Touche, Faber worked as the Executive Director of the American Chamber of Commerce in Albania for 14 years. In this capacity, Faber worked with representatives of the Albanian and American governments, international organizations, and the European Union (EU), and similar business organizations in the United States and Europe.

In January 2015, Faber was appointed Albania's ambassador to the United States by then-president Bujar Nishani. She presented her credentials to President of the United States Barack Obama. She was also accredited to Mexico, the Dominican Republic, and Panama as non-resident Ambassador. Faber served as Ambassador until July 2023.

== Personal life ==
Floreta Faber is married to Dr. Edmond Faber, a vascular surgeon. They have a daughter Kesli (born in 2000) and a son Klint (born in 2003).
