= Dielli (newspaper) =

Newspaper published in the United States

Dielli (The Sun)
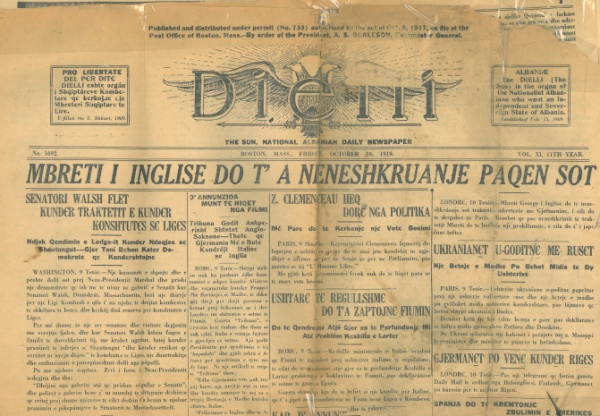
- Publisher: Vatra, the Pan-Albanian Federation of America
- Editor-in-chief: Sokol Paja
- Founded: February 15, 1909 (Boston, MA)
- Relaunched: 2011
- Language: Albanian, English
- Headquarters: 2437 Southern Blvd, Bronx, NY 10458
- Country: US
- ISSN: 2166-9139
- OCLC number: 9287814
- Website: gazetadielli.com

Dielli is a newspaper published in the United States by Vatra, the Pan-Albanian Federation of America.

== History ==
Dielli started on February 15, 1909, as a political-patriotic newspaper of the Besa-Besën society of Boston, Massachusetts, one of the main organizations of the Albanian diaspora in the US. Its first manager was George Konda. In 1912, "Besa-Besën" and other Albanian-American organization merged into "Vatra", while the newspaper became the official press organ of the new society with Kristo Kirka as manager. It was founded by Fan Noli, and it is one of the longest Albanian publications in overall.

Dielli's list of chief-editors includes prominent figures of Albanian emigre in the US, and Albanian politics in general throughout the 20th century: Fan Noli, Adem Hysi, Faik Konitza, Kristo Floqi, Christo Dako, Paskal Aleksi, Dennis Kambury, Costa Chekrezi, Bahri Omari, Loni P. Hristo, Andon S. Frashëri, Andrea D. Elia, Nelo Drizari, Qerim Panariti, Xhevat Kallajxhi, Eduard Liço.

From 1990 to 1994, the newspaper was in turmoil, changing managers frequently Din Derti, Arshi Pipa, Gjon Buçaj, Agim Karagjozi, Agim Rexhaj, Anton Çefa. It stopped publishing in December 2006, due to divergences of the editorial staff with Vatra's council. It restarted publishing in 2011. It has been headquartered in various locations including Detroit, Michigan; Worcester, Massachusetts; and Boston, Massachusetts.

Dielli has covered a wide thematic starting from political, patriotic, also performing social, cultural, poetic, and informative activities. During its lifespan, it has focused on various problems concerning the Albanian society starting from the National Cause, following with World War I and the newly created Albanian state, de-feudalisation of Albania, working class rights, as well as thematics concerning Albanian American society.
