= Thomas Nassi =

Albanian-American musician

- Born: March 2, 1892; Dardha, Ottoman Empire (modern Albania)
- Died: December 21, 1964 (aged 72)
- Occupations: musician, music educator

Thomas Nassi (March 2, 1892 – December 21, 1964) was an Albanian-American musician and music educator in both Albania and the United States, his adopted country.

== Biography ==
Thomas Nassi was born Thoma Nashi (Nasji), in Dardha, then in the Ottoman Empire. Nassi showed early talent in music, first in violin, and then flute. He emigrated to the United States from Greece in 1914 at age 22, first working at a paper company in Maine. He entered the New England Conservatory (NEC) in 1916, majoring in flute performance and conducting.

Nassi graduated from NEC in 1918, in which year he also married Olympia Berishi Tsika. Olympia Tsika was a talented singer who had emigrated to the United States from the very same town (Dardha) in Albania, where Nassi was born and spent his first six years. They had three children.

In 1918 Nassi joined the U.S. Army. Discharged as a naturalized citizen in 1920, Nassi took a remobilized Vatra Band to Albania in order to support the Albanian Independence movement. Albania had gained independence from Turkey in 1912, the last European nation to be freed from Ottoman Turkish control. However, attempts were under way by Greece and Italy to partition and annex Albania. At considerable risk, the Vatra Band helped sustain national morale. Nassi's songs, especially "Vlora Vlora", celebrating defense of a town against the Italian army, became popular throughout the country.

After hostilities ended, Nassi and the Vatra Band toured all the major towns in Albania. Because of Albania's long Turkish rule, the people had no exposure to Western music. Nassi introduced many Albanians to a variety of Western musical genre including Wagner and Handel's Messiah (parts of which he translated to Albanian). He can thus be regarded as the father of introduction of Western music to his native land. During the six years they spent in Albania, Nassi and his wife organized Albania's school music system and organized bands and choral societies. He composed a mass, two rhapsodies, and two operettas, the scores to which were not available in 1999, a time when communication with post-Communist Albanian society was still limited.

In 1924, Yugoslav-assisted forces of Ahmet Zogu seized power from the democratically oriented government led by Bishop Fan S. Noli. By 1926 Nassi became disillusioned with Zoglu's increasingly autocratic tendencies (he took the title, King Zog, in 1928). Nassi returned to the United States and reassumed musical activity in the Albanian Orthodox Churches in Massachusetts.

In 1929 Nassi and family moved to Cape Cod, Massachusetts, first to Chatham, and then to Orleans, where he remained until his death. Mr. and Mrs. Nassi taught public school instrumental music in upper Cape Cod from the fifth grade onward. (From 1937 to 1944 I was one of their students in Provincetown.)

Since the fall of the Communist government of Albania, an emigre Albanian musician, Eno Koco, has offered supplementary notes on Nassi's song compositions and life in Albania on a web site at the University of Leeds (http://www.leeds.ac.uk/music/eno_koco/korcare3.html)

== Sources ==
- American National Biography, Oxford University Press, p. 241-242, by Frank T. Manheim (1999).
