= Zër' i Popullit =

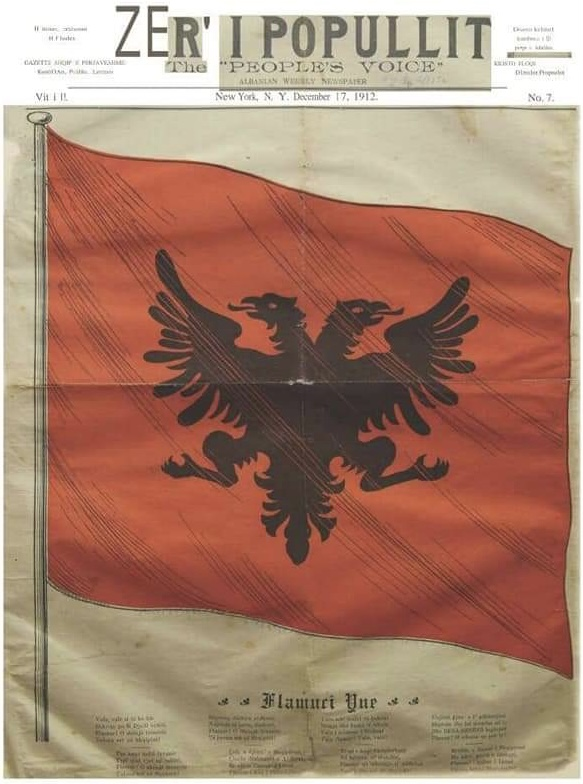
Cover page of the 7th issue of Zer' i Popullit newspaper.

Zër' i Popullit ('The People's Voice') was an Albanian language (Tosk dialect) weekly newspaper published in New York City, United States from 1912–1913. Kristo Floqi was the owner and chief editor of the newspaper. The newspaper carried some articles in English language. The issues of the newspaper consisted of four pages and had a 37 × 52 centimetre format.
