= Vatra, the Pan-Albanian Federation of America =

Albanian-American civic and cultural organization founded in 1912

- Federata Panshqiptare e Amerikës Vatra
- Current seal of Vatra
- Abbreviation: Vatra
- Predecessor: Besa-Besën; Flamuri i Krujës; Shoqëria Kombëtare; Dallëndyshja
- Formation: 28 April 1912; 114 years ago
- Founded at: Boston, Massachusetts, United States
- Type: Civic and cultural membership organization
- Headquarters: 2437 Southern Boulevard, The Bronx, New York City, New York 10458, United States
- Region served: Worldwide (Albanian diaspora)
- Official language: Albanian; English
- President: Elmi Berisha
- Vice-President: Alfons Grishaj
- Chair of the Council: Kolec Ndoja
- Editor of Dielli: Sokol Paja
- Key people: Fan Noli; Faik Konica
- Main organ: Dielli
- Website: vatrausa.org

Vatra, the Pan-Albanian Federation of America (Albanian: Federata Panshqiptare e Amerikës Vatra; "The Hearth") is an Albanian-American civic and cultural organization founded in Boston, Massachusetts, on 28 April 1912. It developed from efforts to unite a number of existing Albanian-American societies into a national federation and was formally recognized by the Commonwealth of Massachusetts on 13 June 1912.

During the period surrounding the declaration of Albanian independence and the First World War, Vatra became one of the principal Albanian diaspora organizations in the United States. Through its press, community network, fundraising and diplomatic advocacy, the federation participated in efforts to secure international recognition for Albania and preserve the territorial integrity of the Albanian state.

Dielli ("The Sun"), an Albanian-language newspaper founded in Boston in 1909, became Vatra's principal press organ following the federation's establishment. Vatra also published the English-language monthly The Adriatic Review from 1918 to 1919.

The federation is currently headquartered at 2437 Southern Boulevard in The Bronx, New York City. Its activities are centered on the Albanian-American community while also engaging with the wider Albanian diaspora. Elmi Berisha has served as president since 2020 and was reelected on 27 June 2026.

== History ==
=== Origins and founding ===
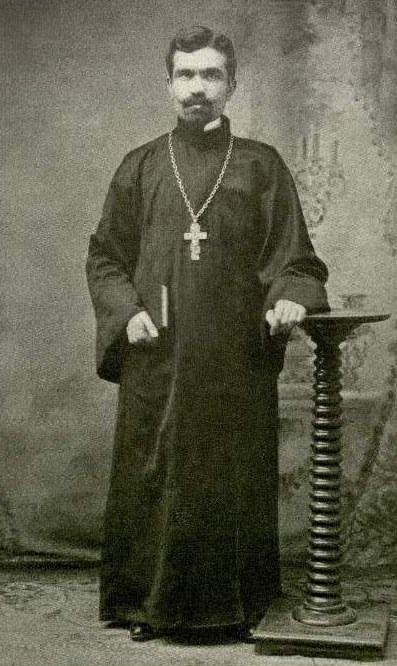
Fan Noli

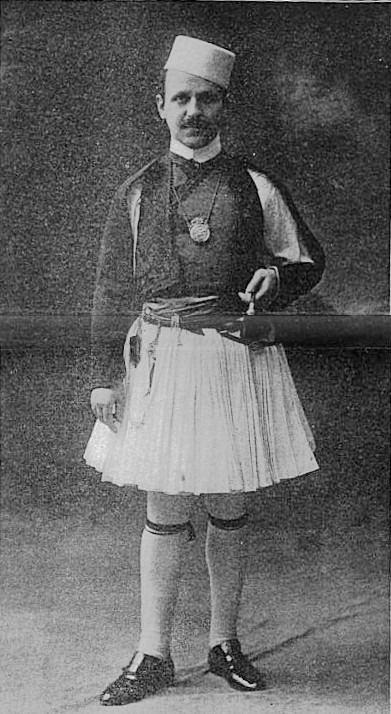
Faik Konica

Fan Noli and Faik Konica were among the leading figures associated with Vatra's formation and early development.

Albanian immigration to the United States increased during the late nineteenth and early twentieth centuries. Boston and other parts of New England became important early centers of Albanian-American community life, where immigrants established mutual-aid, cultural and political societies associated with the Albanian National Awakening.

Boston also became a center of Albanian-language publishing. Kombi, founded in 1906, was among the early Albanian newspapers published in the United States. On 6 January 1907, Albanian immigrants in Boston established the Besa-Besën society.

On 15 February 1909, Besa-Besën began publishing Dielli. Fan Noli served as the newspaper's first editor, while Faik Konica later assumed an important editorial role.

By 1911, representatives of several Albanian-American societies were discussing the creation of a national federation. A unification commission associated with the process included Noli, Konica, Kristo Floqi and Paskal Aleksi.

Historic seal of Vatra.

The Pan-Albanian Federation of America was formally established on 28 April 1912. Historical accounts identify Besa-Besën, Flamuri i Krujës, Shoqëria Kombëtare and other Albanian-American associations among those involved in the unification process.

Fan Noli served as secretary of the provisional organization. Other early organizers included Llambi Chikozi, Kristo Kirka, Faik Konica, Kristo Floqi, Paskal Aleksi and Elia Tromara.

Vatra was formally recognized by the Commonwealth of Massachusetts on 13 June 1912. Its establishment preceded the Albanian declaration of independence at Vlorë on 28 November 1912 by several months.

=== Albanian independence and the Balkan Wars ===
Vatra was created during a period of rapid political change in southeastern Europe. The Balkan Wars and the collapse of Ottoman rule in much of the Balkans created uncertainty regarding the political status and future borders of Albanian-inhabited territories.

Vatra organized public meetings, fundraising campaigns and appeals in support of Albanian independence. Dielli served as one of the federation's principal means of communicating with the Albanian-American community.

Noli, Konica and other Vatra figures participated in the wider Albanian national movement. The federation opposed proposals for the partition of Albanian-inhabited territories and advocated international recognition of the new Albanian state.

=== First World War and diaspora diplomacy ===
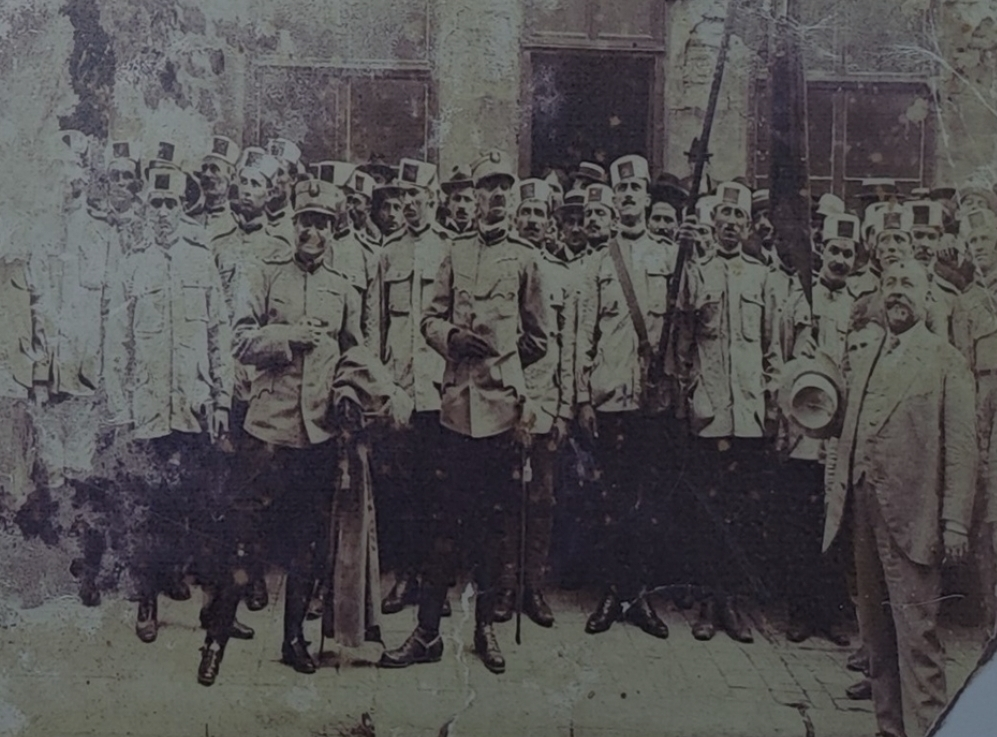
Albanian volunteers from the United States associated with Vatra, 1916.

The First World War disrupted the institutions of the recently established Albanian state and resulted in the occupation of Albanian territory by several foreign armies.

During this period, Vatra expanded its political, financial and diplomatic activities. The federation raised funds, maintained an organized press, communicated with diplomatic representatives and supported delegates advocating Albanian interests in Europe.

A 2026 study of the Albanian diaspora and state-building describes the institutional network developed around Vatra—including the press, community organizations, religious and educational institutions, political representation and financial mobilization—as a transnational infrastructure that operated during the war as a de facto government-in-exile.

Fan Noli and Faik Konica were among the principal figures associated with Vatra's international work. Other Albanian political representatives connected to diplomatic efforts during the period included Mihal Turtulli, Mehmed Konica and Kristo Dako.

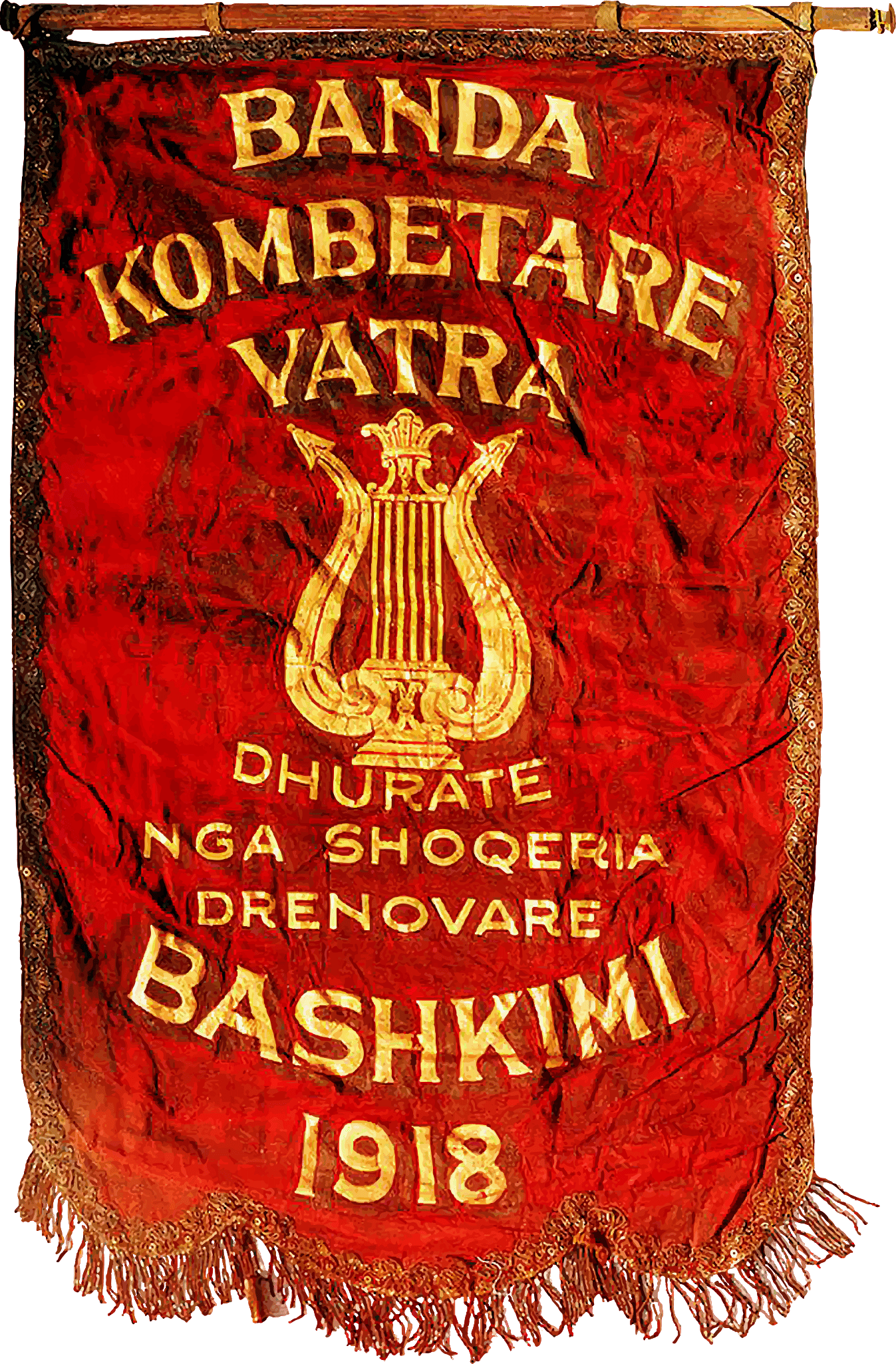
Flag associated with the Vatra National Band, 1918.

Vatra's activities were not limited to political advocacy. Cultural initiatives connected to the federation included the Vatra National Band, formed during the First World War period.

The federation also expanded its publishing activity. In September 1918, it began financing the English-language monthly The Adriatic Review, intended to explain Albania and Albanian political claims to an English-speaking audience.

=== Paris Peace Conference and League of Nations ===
Following the First World War, Vatra participated in Albanian diaspora diplomacy connected with the Paris Peace Conference.

The federation financed diplomatic activity and supported representatives seeking to preserve Albania's independence and territorial integrity. Albanian-American fundraising helped sustain delegations and political advocacy in Europe and the United States.

Vatra representatives submitted memoranda and communicated with political figures in Britain and other European states concerning the Albanian question. Research on the period identifies Vatra and other Albanian diaspora organizations as important actors in the campaign surrounding Albania's international status.

Fan Noli later became an important advocate for Albania's admission to the League of Nations. Albania was admitted on 17 December 1920.

=== Interwar period ===
Following the consolidation of Albania's international position, Vatra's political role shifted toward debates concerning Albania's domestic political development and the organization of the Albanian-American community.

Prominent Vatra figures became directly involved in Albanian politics. Fan Noli briefly served as Prime Minister of Albania in 1924, while Faik Konica later served as Albania's diplomatic representative to the United States.

Political disagreements concerning Noli, Ahmet Zogu and Albania's political direction contributed to divisions within the Albanian diaspora. Financial pressures during the Great Depression also affected Albanian-American organizations.

Despite periods of disagreement and organizational division, Vatra continued cultural, community and publishing activities.

=== Second World War and Cold War ===
The Italian invasion of Albania in April 1939 again brought Albanian political questions to the forefront of diaspora activity.

Vatra and Dielli remained active during the Second World War. Gerim M. Panarity became editor of Dielli during the 1940s and remained in the position until 1963.

Following the establishment of a communist government under Enver Hoxha, Albanian émigré organizations differed over their relationship with the new government. Vatra continued to operate in the United States while maintaining Dielli and its community institutions.

During the Cold War, Vatra increasingly focused on Albanian-American community organization, publishing, cultural activities and the preservation of institutional history.

=== Post-communist period ===
The collapse of Albania's communist system in the early 1990s transformed relations between Albania and the diaspora.

During the same period, the demographic center of Albanian-American life was changing as new immigration from Albania, Kosovo, Montenegro, North Macedonia and other Albanian-speaking regions increased.

Vatra's central offices, historically associated with Boston, moved to the New York area during the 1990s. The federation later established its headquarters in the Bronx.

== Organization ==
=== Headquarters and geographic reach ===
Vatra is headquartered at 2437 Southern Boulevard, Bronx, New York 10458, United States.

The organization was founded in Boston, which served as its principal institutional center for much of the twentieth century. Its central operations later shifted to New York City.

Vatra's branch structure is centered primarily in the United States, while the federation describes its institutional mission as extending to the broader Albanian diaspora and to relations with institutions in Albania, Kosovo and other Albanian-populated regions.

In August 2026, the organization identified branch leadership representing communities including Boston, Queens, Michigan, Jacksonville, Tampa Bay–Clearwater, South Florida, Hudson Valley, Toronto, Hartford, New Jersey, Worcester, Ridgewood, Miami, Westchester–Putnam, Chicago, North Jersey, Long Island and Utah.

=== Governance ===
Vatra's contemporary governing structure is defined by its Constitution and By-Laws.

According to the 2026 revisions, the principal governing institutions include the Assembly, the Council, the Executive Board, branch executive boards and branch conferences.

The Assembly is the federation-wide representative body. The Council performs governance and oversight functions between assemblies, while the Executive Board is responsible for ongoing administration.

The 2026 revisions to the Constitution and By-Laws were approved by the Vatra Assembly on 27 June 2026.

=== Current leadership ===
Elmi Berisha was reelected president at the electoral assembly held on 27 June 2026. Contemporary reporting stated that Berisha received 22 votes, Pashko Camaj eight and Adriatik Spahiu four from the 34 delegates participating in the presidential ballot.

Principal leadership announced in 2026
Office	Name
President	Elmi Berisha
Vice-President	Alfons Grishaj
Secretary	Mondi Rakaj
Treasurer	Ilir Cubi
Chair of the Council	Kolec Ndoja
Editor of Dielli	Sokol Paja

On 5 August 2026, Vatra also announced Dritan Demiraj, Mirela Kanini, Bashkim Musabelliu, Anton Raja, Paulin Mernaçaj, Tasim Ruko and Bardh Tomaj as additional members of the Executive Board.

The Council is a separate governing body chaired by Kolec Ndoja. Vatra announced a 33-member Council in August 2026, including branch chairs serving within the federation's governance structure.

== Publications ==
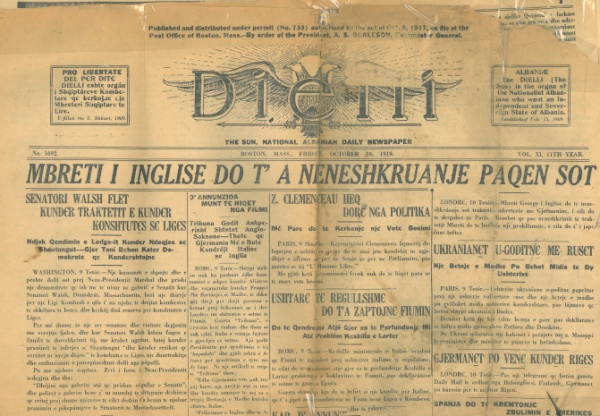
An early issue of Dielli

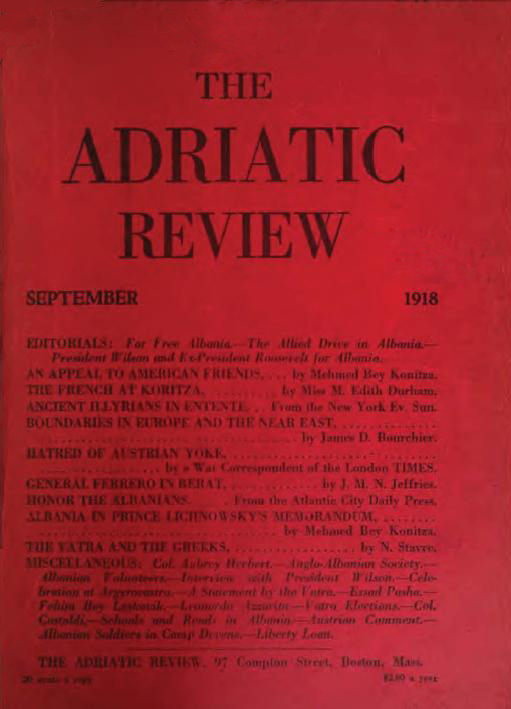
September 1918 cover of The Adriatic Review

Vatra's two principal historical publications.

=== Dielli ===
Dielli ("The Sun") is Vatra's principal newspaper. It was founded in Boston on 15 February 1909 by the Besa-Besën society, three years before the establishment of Vatra.

Fan Noli served as its first editor. Faik Konica later became editor, and following the creation of Vatra in 1912, Dielli became the federation's principal press organ.

The newspaper has appeared at different frequencies during its history and has been edited by numerous Albanian and Albanian-American writers, journalists and political figures.

Gerim M. Panarity became editor during the 1940s and remained in the position until his retirement in 1963.

Sokol Paja was appointed editor of the Albanian-language edition in July 2021 and continued to be identified as editor in the federation's 2026 leadership announcement.

=== The Adriatic Review ===
The Adriatic Review was an English-language monthly periodical published in Boston by Vatra from September 1918 until October 1919.

Fan Noli founded and initially edited the publication. He was later succeeded as editor by Kostë Çekrezi.

The periodical was created during the final months of the First World War and the diplomatic negotiations that followed. It presented Albanian political, historical and cultural issues to an English-speaking audience and formed part of Vatra's international advocacy.

== Archives and historical record ==
Vatra's history is documented through its publications, correspondence, convention proceedings and surviving organizational records.

The Gerim M. Panarity Papers at the University of Chicago Special Collections Research Center constitute a substantial archival collection concerning Vatra, Dielli and Albanian-American history. The collection covers 1911 to 1985 and includes correspondence, legal documents, manuscripts, photographs, maps and Albanian-American newspapers.

The archive includes material relating to Vatra, Dielli, the Albanian Orthodox community in the United States and political developments in twentieth-century Albania.

== Historical significance ==
Historians studying Albanian nationalism and diaspora politics have identified Vatra as an important example of the role immigrant communities played in the political development and international representation of Albania during the early twentieth century.

Research on the First World War period emphasizes Vatra's combination of press activity, community organization, fundraising and diplomatic representation. These institutions connected Albanian communities in the United States with political developments in Albania and Europe.

Studies of the 1919–1920 diplomatic period have also identified Vatra and its representatives as participants in the campaign concerning Albania's territorial status and admission to the League of Nations.

The federation's historical significance is also associated with Albanian-American journalism, particularly through Dielli and The Adriatic Review.

== See also ==
- Albanian Americans
- Albanian diaspora
- Fan S. Noli
- Faik Konica
- Kristo Floqi
- Kristo Kirka
- Dielli
- The Adriatic Review
- Albanian National Awakening
- Albanian Declaration of Independence
- Albania–United States relations
