= Sotir Peci =

Albanian politician, educator and mathematician

Sotir Jovan Peci
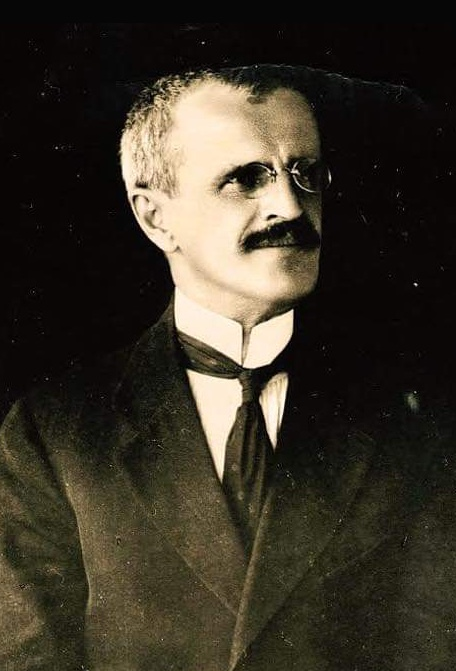
- Sotir Peci
- Born: July 13, 1873; Dardhë, Ottoman Empire (modern Albania)
- Died: April 10, 1932 (aged 58); Florina, Greece
- Occupations: teacher, mathematician, politician
- Known for: Having been the Minister of Education of Albania
- Father: Jovan Peci

Sotir Peci (1873–1932) was an Albanian politician, educator and mathematician. In 1906 he published the first Albanian-language newspaper in the United States of America in Boston. In 1908 he participated as a delegate in the Congress of Monastir. In 1920 he was appointed Minister of Education of Albania. He also taught at the Normal School of Elbasan and published the Albanian dictionary written by Kostandin Kristoforidhi.

== Early life ==
Sotir Peci was born in Dardhë, a village near Korçë, on July 13, 1873. The son of wealthy merchant Jovan Peci, his father died while he was a child. Peci studied at the local school in Korçë. In 1890 at the age of 17 he enrolled at the University of Athens where he studied physical sciences and graduated with a degree in mathematics. While in Athens he published the Albanian dictionary written by Kostandin Kristoforidhi.

== Activities in the United States ==
In 1905 Peci migrated to the United States, settling in Boston. There he became a member of the Patriotic Brotherhood of Dardha (Albanian: Vëllezëria Patriotike e Dardhës) and published the weekly newspaper The Nation (Albanian: Kombi), the first Albanian-language newspaper in the USA. In 1906 he employed the literary, religious, and patriotic figure Fan Noli as deputy editor of the newspaper.

== Activities in Albania ==
In 1908 Peci participated in the Congress of Monastir, an academic conference held in Manastir (modern Bitola), in the Vilayet of Monastir from 14 to 22 November 1908, with the goal of standardizing the Albanian alphabet, as a delegate of the Albanian communities living in the United States of America for whom he was granted three votes. After returning to Albania in 1908 he taught at the Normal School of Elbasan. During the late Ottoman period, Peci supported Austro-Hungarian assistance toward Albanian geopolitical interests in the Balkans.

Sotir Peci wrote a series of textbooks in physics, mathematics and grammar and was appointed director of education of Korçë. He was a member of the Committee for the National Defence of Kosovo, founded in Shkodër in late 1918. He also participated at the national Congress of Lushnjë where a new national cabinet was elected with Sulejman Delvina as its prime minister. Sotir Peci was elected Minister of Education. In 1921 he was elected deputy of Korçë. He also became a member of the Supreme Council of Regency.

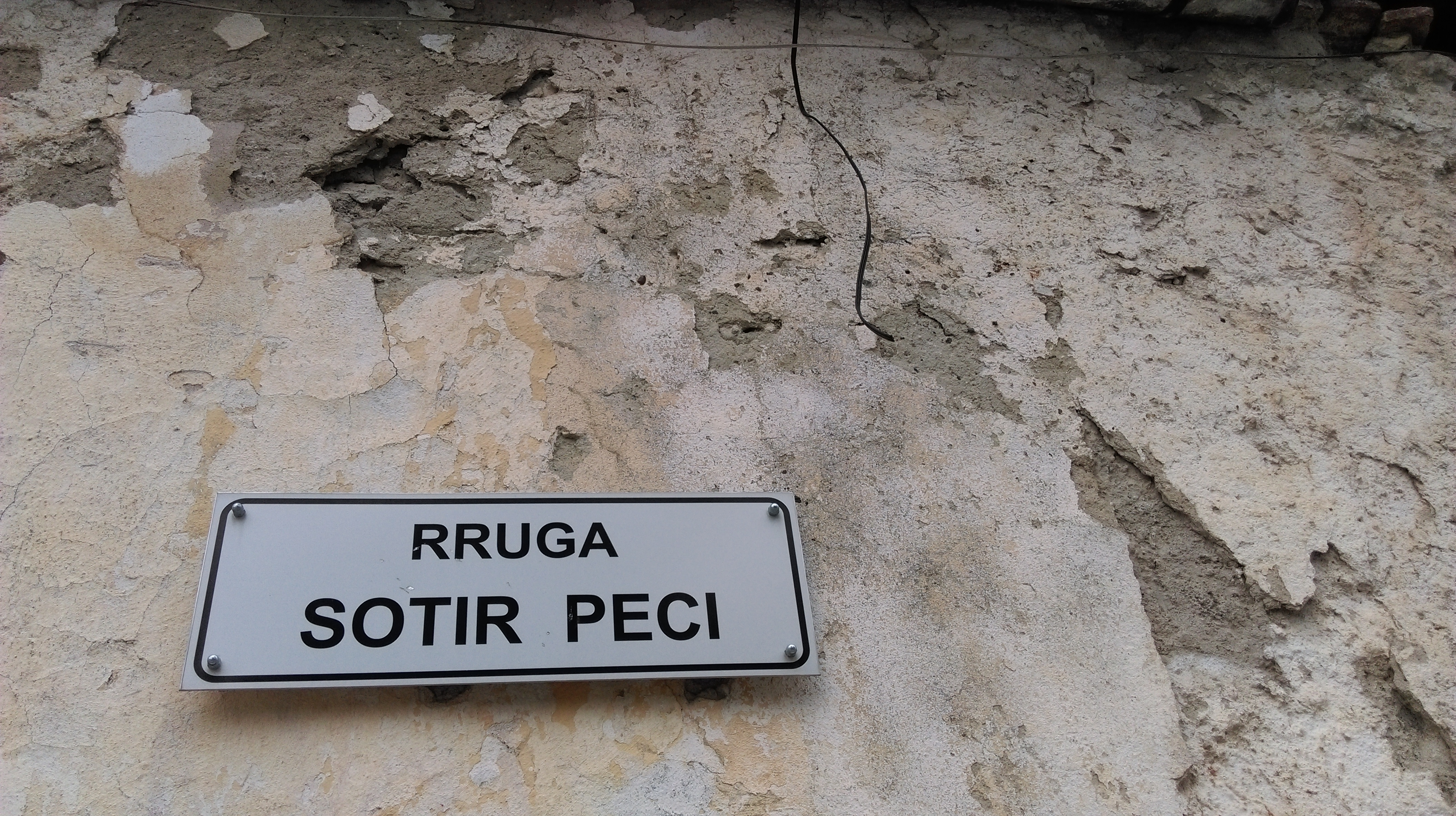
Sotir Peci street in Korçë

In 1924 he appointed the bishop of Durrës Fan Noli as prime minister of Albania. After the failure of the June Revolution and rise of Ahmet Zogu in power, Peci left to Italy and later settled in Greece. He was given a death sentence in absent, but then revoked by the partial amnesty that Zog applied. Anyway, he never reconciled with the Tirana politics. Sotir Peci died in Florina in 1932. His body was reburied in Korçë with great honors while Zog was in power. He was honoured posthumously with the title Teacher of the People (Albanian: Mësues i Popullit). A road and a school in Korçë were renamed after him.

== See also ==
- National Renaissance of Albania
- Congress of Lushnjë
