= Faik Konica =

Albanian writer (1875–1942)

Faik Konica Bey
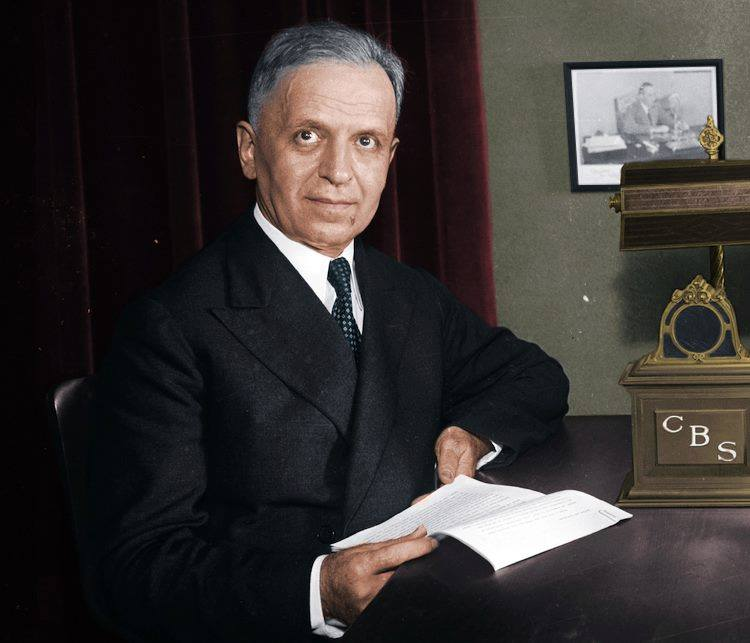
- Konica in 1931
- Born: 15 March 1875; Koniçe, Janina Vilayet, Ottoman Empire (modern Greece)
- Died: 15 December 1942 (aged 67); Washington, D.C., U.S.
- Other names: Faik Salko; Dominik Konitza
- Education: University of Dijon; Harvard
- Occupations: Writer, statesman
- Known for: Albanian language literary style Albania periodical Dielli periodical Vatra Federation; Albanian Congress of Trieste; First Albanian Ambassador to United States
- Parent(s): Shahin Zenelbej and Lalia Zenelbej
- Relatives: Mehmed Konica, Rustem Konica, Hilmi Konica (Brothers)

Faik Bey Konica (later named Faïk Dominik Konitza, 15 March 1875 – 15 December 1942) was an important figure in Albanian language and culture in the early decades of the twentieth century. As the Albanian minister to Washington, D.C., his literary review Albania became the focal publication of Albanian writers living abroad. Faik Konica wrote little in the way of literature, but he was an influential stylist, critic, publicist and political figure in Albanian culture.

== Biography ==
Konica was born on 15 March 1875 as a son of Shahin and Lalia Zenelbej in the town of Koniçe (modern Konitsa), Janina Vilayet, Ottoman Empire, now in northern Greece, not far from the present Albanian border. He had three brothers: Mehmed, Rustem and Hilmi. After elementary schooling in Turkish in his native town, he studied at the Xavierian Jesuit College in Shkodër which offered him some instruction in Albania and also an initial contact with central European culture and Western ideas. From there, he continued his schooling at the eminent French-language Imperial Galatasaray High School in Istanbul. During his youth, Konica cultivated his skills in Albanian and amassed a small library of books by foreign Albanologists.

In 1890, at the age of fifteen, he was sent to study in France where he spent the next seven years. After initial education at secondary schools in Lisieux (1890) and Carcassonne (1892), he registered at the University of Dijon, from which he graduated in 1895 in Romance languages and philology. After graduation, he moved to Paris for two years where he studied Medieval French literature, Latin and Greek at the famous Collège de France. He finished his studies at Harvard University in the United States, although little is known of this period of his life. As a result of his highly varied educational background, he was able to speak and write Albanian, Greek, Italian, French, German, English and Turkish fluently. In 1895, Konica converted from Islam to Roman Catholicism, and changed his name from Faik to Dominik, signing for many years as Faik Dominik Konica. However, in 1897 he would say "All religions make me vomit" and he later was described an atheist by some sources.

== Albania (periodical) ==
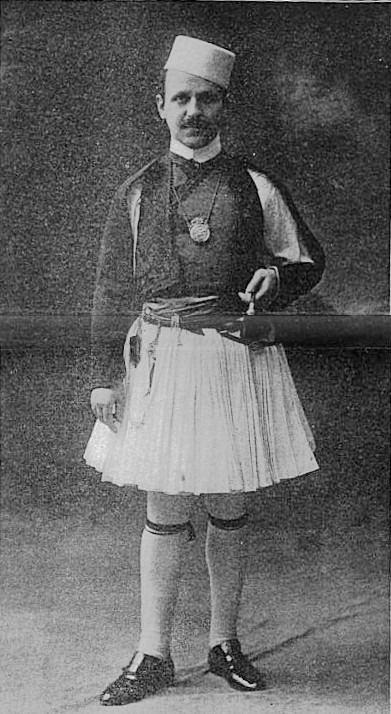
A young Faik Konica in national Albanian dress, 1918

While in Brussels, in 1896 and 1897 Konica started the publication of the periodical Albania, with publication ending in 1909, after he departed for the US.

Albanian publications were published abroad as the Ottoman Empire forbid the writing of Albanian and like other Albanian writers of the time Konica used a pseudonym Trank Spiro Bey, named after a Catholic Ottoman figure Trank Spiro, to bypass those conditions for his works. In 1903–1904, Faik Konica was a resident at Oakley Crescent in Islington, London. There he continued to edit and publish, under the pseudonym Trank Spiro Beg, the dual language (French/Albanian) periodical Albania that he had founded in Brussels in 1897. He contributed bitingly sarcastic articles on what he saw as the cultural backwardness and naivety of his compatriots, stressed the need for economic development and national unity among Muslim and Christian Albanians and opposed armed struggle. Support for a better Ottoman administration was advocated for by Konica through reforms in Albania. Konica's mastery of complexity and fine details of Albanian and its dialects was reflected in his writing style being refined and rich in expression. He also endeavored to enrich Albanian vocabulary through words of the people and folklore raising the ability of Albanian to treat complex and difficult topics, unparalleled among other Albanian-language publications of the time. Albania contributed to the development of national sentiment among Albanians through focusing on topics such as folklore, poetry, Albanian history and the medieval figure of Skanderbeg.

Albania helped to spread awareness of Albanian culture and the Albanian cause across Europe, and was highly influential in the development and refinement of Southern Albanian prose writing. In the words of the famous French poet Guillaume Apollinaire, "Konica turned a rough idiom of sailors inns into a beautiful, rich and supple language". Konica also published the works of Albanian writers of the time like Aleksandër Stavre Drenova, Andon Zako Çajupi, Filip Shiroka, Gjergj Fishta, Kostandin Kristoforidhi, Thimi Mitko and so on. Theodor Anton Ippen, a diplomat of Austria-Hungary, was one of the authors whose texts were published in the Konica's periodical. Konica assured Ippen that he and his friends believed that Albania should be in political and military union with Austria. Writing in his periodical Albania during 1906 Konica viewed independence as being some "twenty years" away and stressed that focus be devoted toward placing the Albanian nation "on the road to civilization" that would lead to "liberation".

A committee founded by Dervish Hima in Paris that sought to make Albert Ghica the prince of Albania established close ties with Konica, who at the time was pro-Austrian. Konica viewed Italo-Albanians (Arbëreshë) as Italian citizens who would have difficulty going against Italian interests while at the same time supporting the conflicting goal of Albanian autonomy or independence and refused to cooperate with them. Italo-Albanians criticized his pro-Austrian position, while Konica defended it on grounds that Austria encouraged Albanian national and linguistic expression among Catholic Albanians in its schools unlike Italy. The Young Turks (CUP) had a hostile view of Albanian leaders such as Faik Konica who were doing political activities with the assistance of outside powers. Konica during his lifetime developed a reputation of being at times "irritable by temperament", "self-righteous in attitude" and for going into polemics. These issues affected his work with a decline of circulation of Albania as disagreements with Albanian patriots occurred who viewed his works on culture, nationality and rights as being too indirect on the Albanian question unlike the publication Drita. Konica was unable to attend the Albanian Alphabet Congress of 1908, due to receiving his invitation late, something which he considered was done on purpose.

Apollinaire published a memoir of Konica in the Mercure de France on 1 May 1912, which begins: "Of the people I have met and whom I remember with the greatest pleasure, Faik Bey Konica is one of the most unusual". He recalls:

We would have lunch the Albanian way, which is to say, endlessly. The lunches were so long that I could not visit a single museum in London, as we would always arrive when the doors closed, and the attention and care with which Konica edited his articles meant that the journal always came out very late. In 1904, only the issues for 1902 appeared; in 1907, the issues for 1904 came out at regular intervals. The French journal L'Occident is the only one that could compete with Albania in that respect.

== Political activities and death ==
Konica organized the Albanian Congress of Trieste, held 27 February – 6 March 1913.

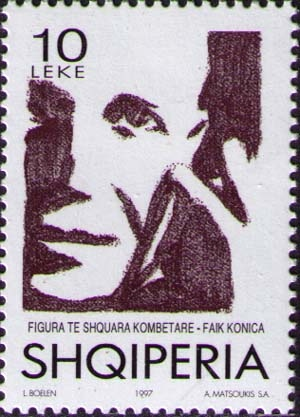
Konica depicted on an Albanian postal stamp

Konica went to Boston in the autumn of 1909 where he took over as chief-editor of Dielli newspaper, published by Besa-Besën society, a political-cultural organization of Albanian-American diaspora. With the creation of Vatra, the Pan-Albanian Federation of America, his role inside the Albanian community of US grew and he became general-secretary of Vatra. Konica was a close collaborator of Fan Noli and one of the main figures in Vatra's and Dielli's history. In 1911, he published Trumbeta e Krujes (Kruja's trumpet), a very short lived newspaper in St. Louis, Missouri. On 17 November 1912, Vatra held a mass gathering in Boston and Konica was the main speaker rallying the Albanian diaspora in the US to oppose any partition of Albania, due to the Balkan Wars.

He was disappointed by the Austro-Hungarian authorities and Ismail Kemal personally, after Kemal's approval for the creation of an Austro-Italian bank (named the Bank of Albania - Albanian: Banka e Shqiperise). The bank was feared amongst Albanians as a means of massive purchasing of land and controlling the future economy of Albania. Konica was one of the main organizers of the Albanian Congress of Trieste in 1913. On 20 November 1913 he went in conflict with Essad Pasha and left Durrës together with his collaborator Fazil Pasha Toptani.

In 1921, he went back to the US where he became president of Vatra, and a columnist in Dielli. In 1929, Ahmet Zogu – newly proclaimed King Zog I of Albania would appoint him as Albanian ambassador to the United States despite his very low opinion on Zogu. He carried this duty until 1939 when Fascist Italy invaded Albania. Konica was a harsh critic of King Zog's decision to abandon Albania on the eve of the Italian invasion.

He died in Washington, D.C., on 15 December 1942 and was buried in Forest Hills Cemetery in Boston. In 1998 his remains were transferred to Tirana and interred at the Tirana Park on the Artificial Lake.
