= List of Albanian Americans =

This is a list of notable Albanian Americans, including original immigrants who obtained American citizenship and their American descendants.

== Politics ==
- Sal Albanese – politician
- Begzat Bix Aliu – diplomat
- Richard Caliguiri – former mayor of Pittsburgh
- Joe DioGuardi – congressman of Arbëreshë origin
- Mark Gjonaj – assemblyman
- Rexhep Krasniqi – historian, teacher, nationalist, anti-communist politician, activist
- Konstantina Lukes – former mayor of Worcester, Massachusetts
- Victor Schiro – former mayor of New Orleans
- Nicholas Scutari – politician
- Ardian Zika – politician
- Faton Bislimi - activist and politician

== Science and academia ==
- Carol Folt – biologist
- William G. Gregory – astronaut
- Wilson Kokalari – aerospace engineer
- Volkan Topalli – criminologist
- Laura Mersini-Houghton – cosmologist
- Ferid Murad – medical researcher, Nobel laureate
- Mira Murati – engineer, former CTO of OpenAI, founder of Thinking Machines Lab
- Arshi Pipa – philosopher, writer, poet, literary critic
- Andrea Shundi – agronomist
- Stavro Skëndi – linguist, historian

== Cinema ==
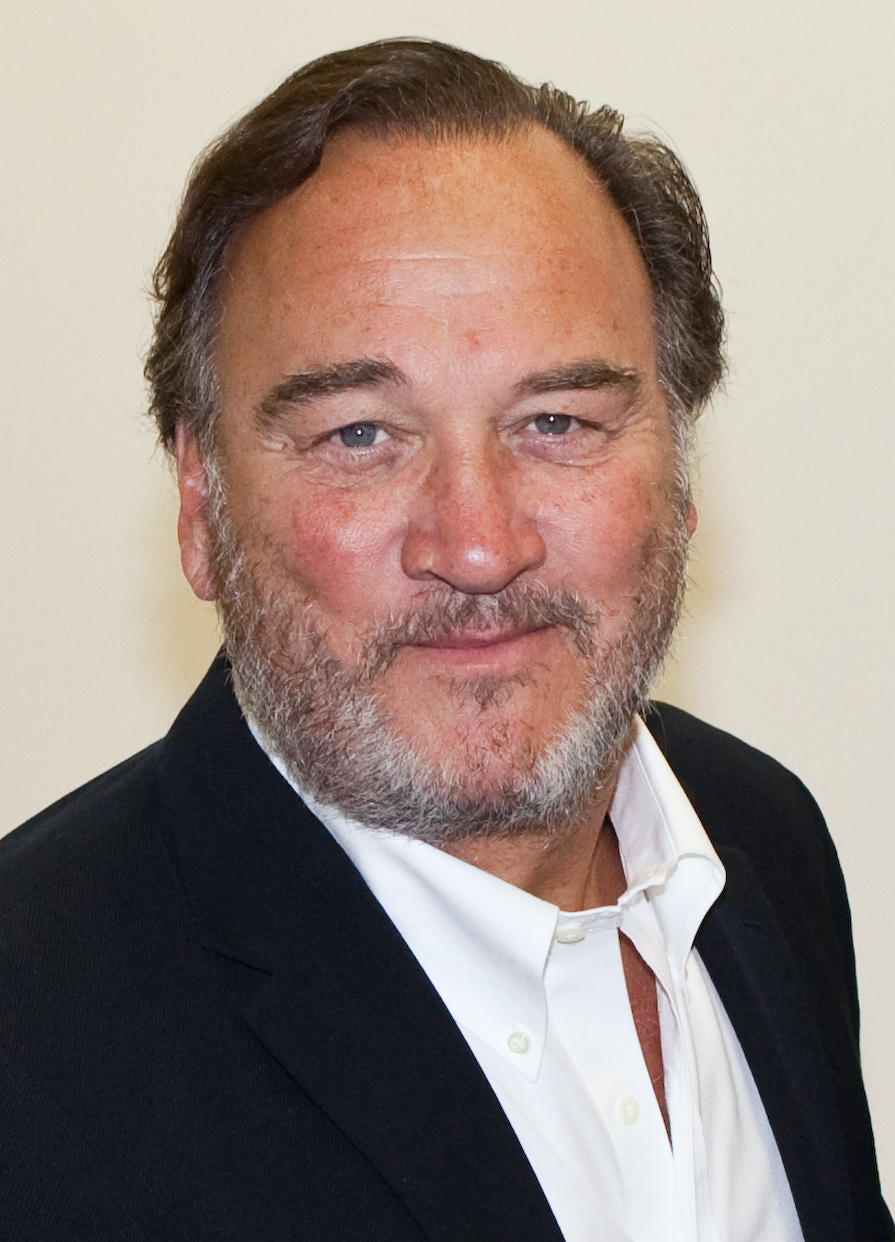
Jim Belushi is an actor and comedian, known for starring in the television sitcom According to Jim, which aired for 8 seasons.

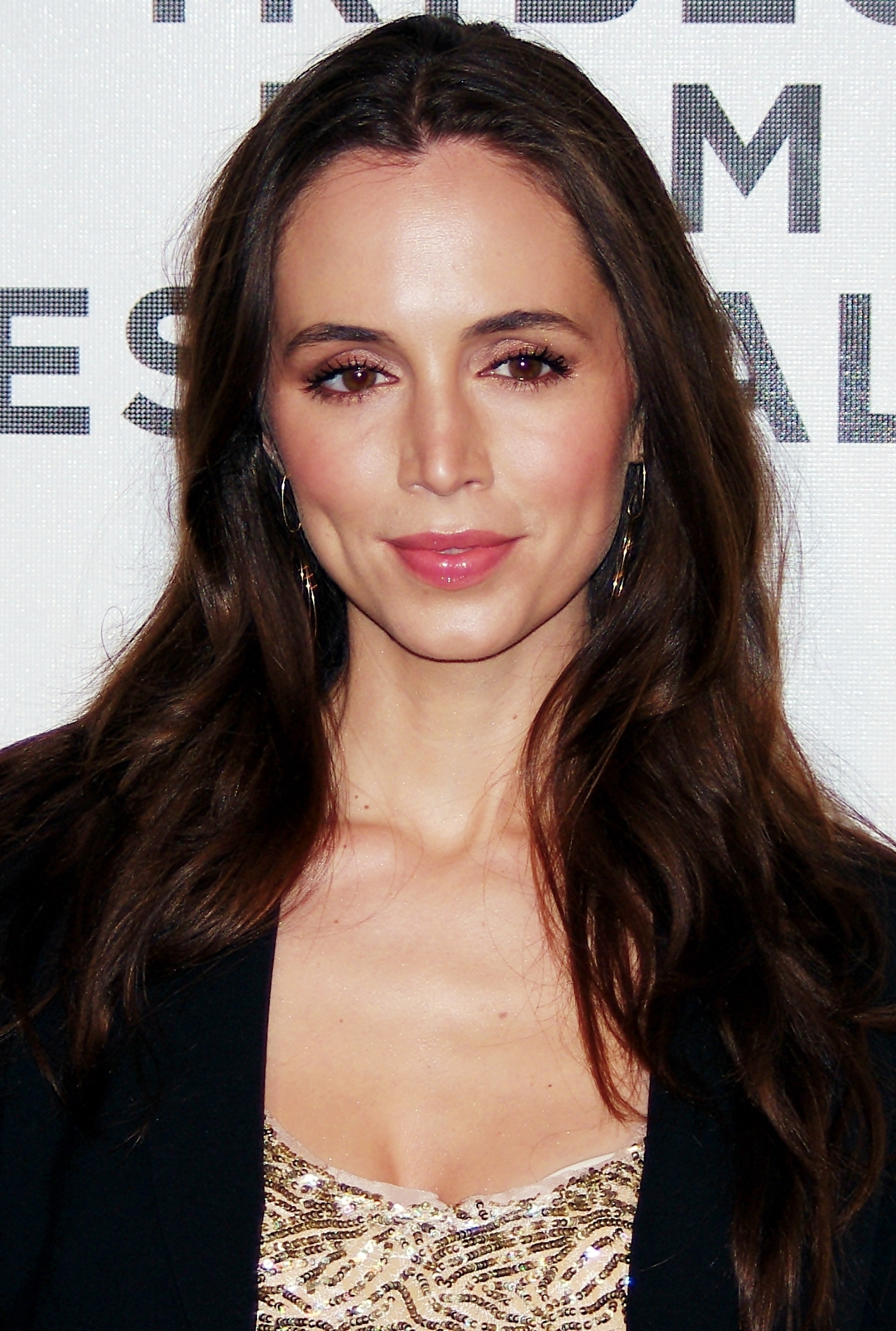
Eliza Dushku is a former actress known for her roles in several television series.

- Jim Belushi – actor
- John Belushi – actor, film producer
- Robert Belushi – actor
- Jamison Belushi – actress
- Jared Belushi – actor
- James Biberi – actor
- Danny DeVito – actor
- Lucy DeVito – actress
- Fatmir Doga – director, producer, writer, actor
- Eliza Dushku – actress
- Nate Dushku – actor
- Stan Dragoti – film director, producer, artist
- Enver Gjokaj – actor
- Victor Gojcaj – actor
- Agim Kaba – actor, film producer
- Masiela Lusha – actress
- Pjetër Malota – actor
- Andamion Murataj – film director, producer, screenwriter
- Tracee Chimo Pallero – television, film and Broadway actress
- Eva Lauren Pepaj – actress and entrepreneur
- Niko Pepaj – actor and model
- J. J. Philbin – producer, screenwriter
- Nickola Shreli – actor, producer
- Nik Xhelilaj – actor
- Jake Abel – actor and producer

== Arts and entertainment ==
=== Musicians ===
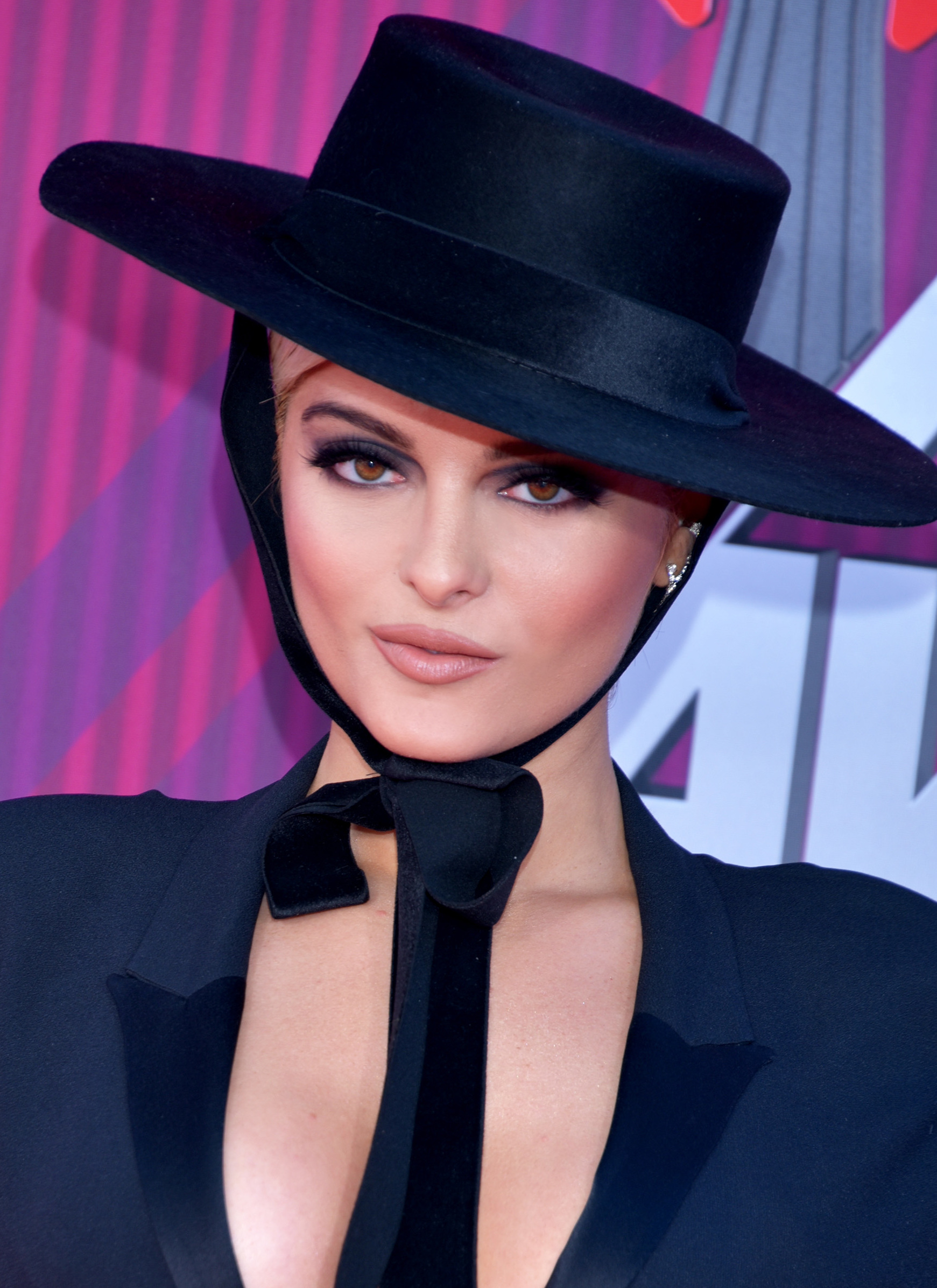
Bebe Rexha is a singer and Grammy Award-winning songwriter.

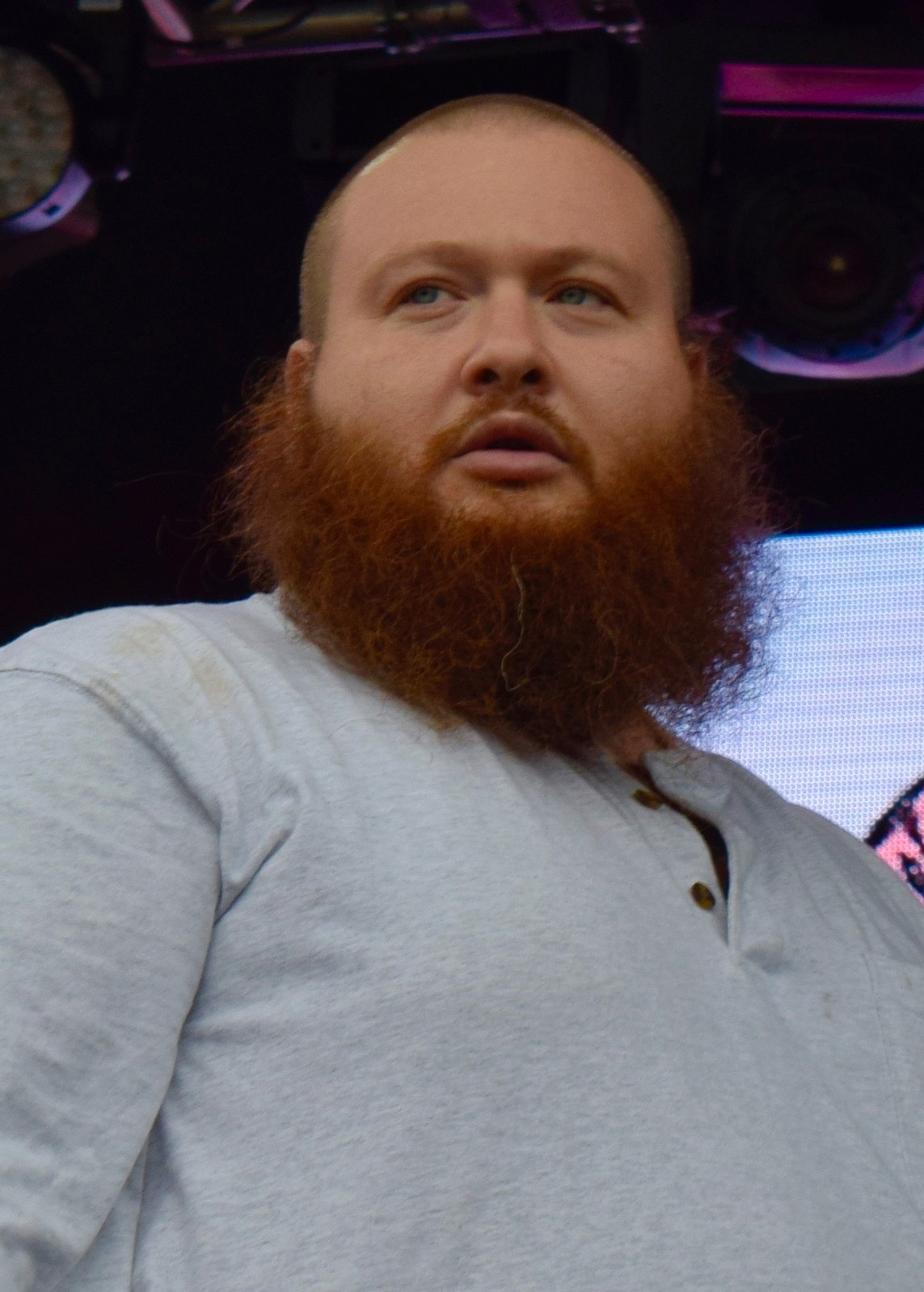
Action Bronson is a hip-hop artist and former television presenter.

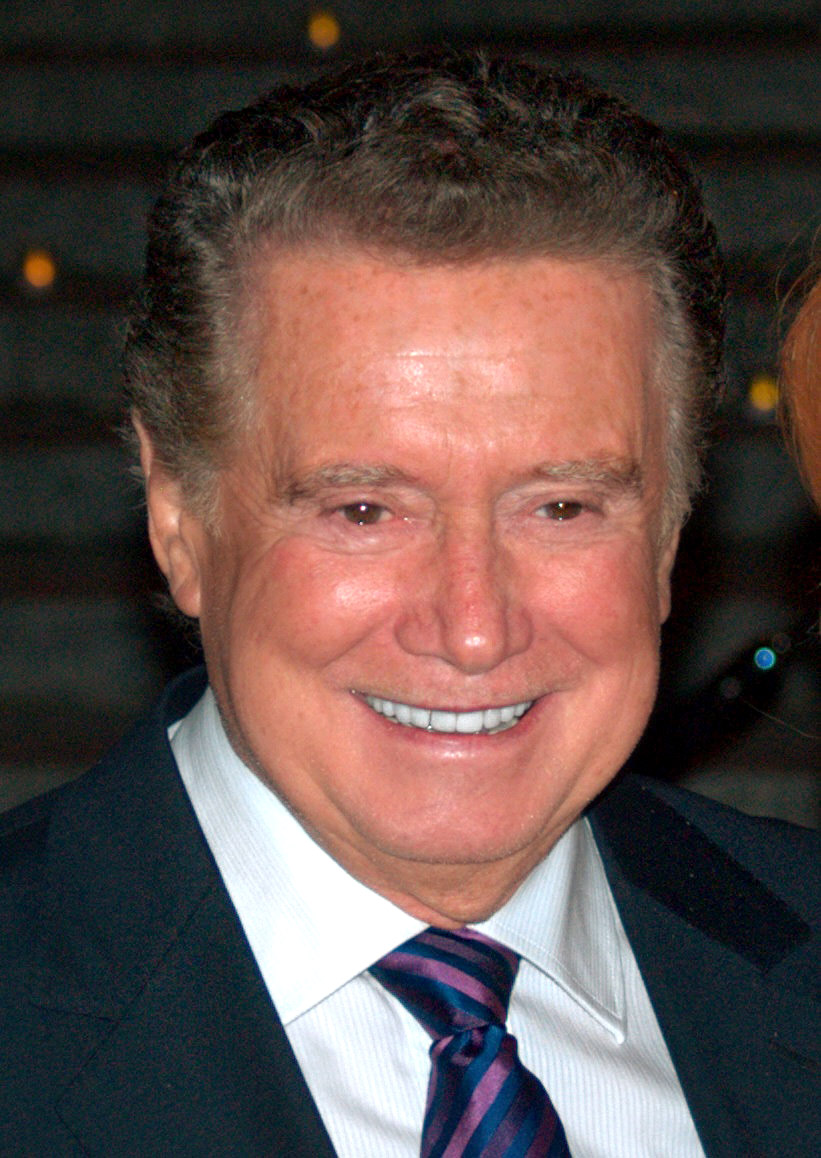
Regis Philbin was a television presenter, comedian and singer.

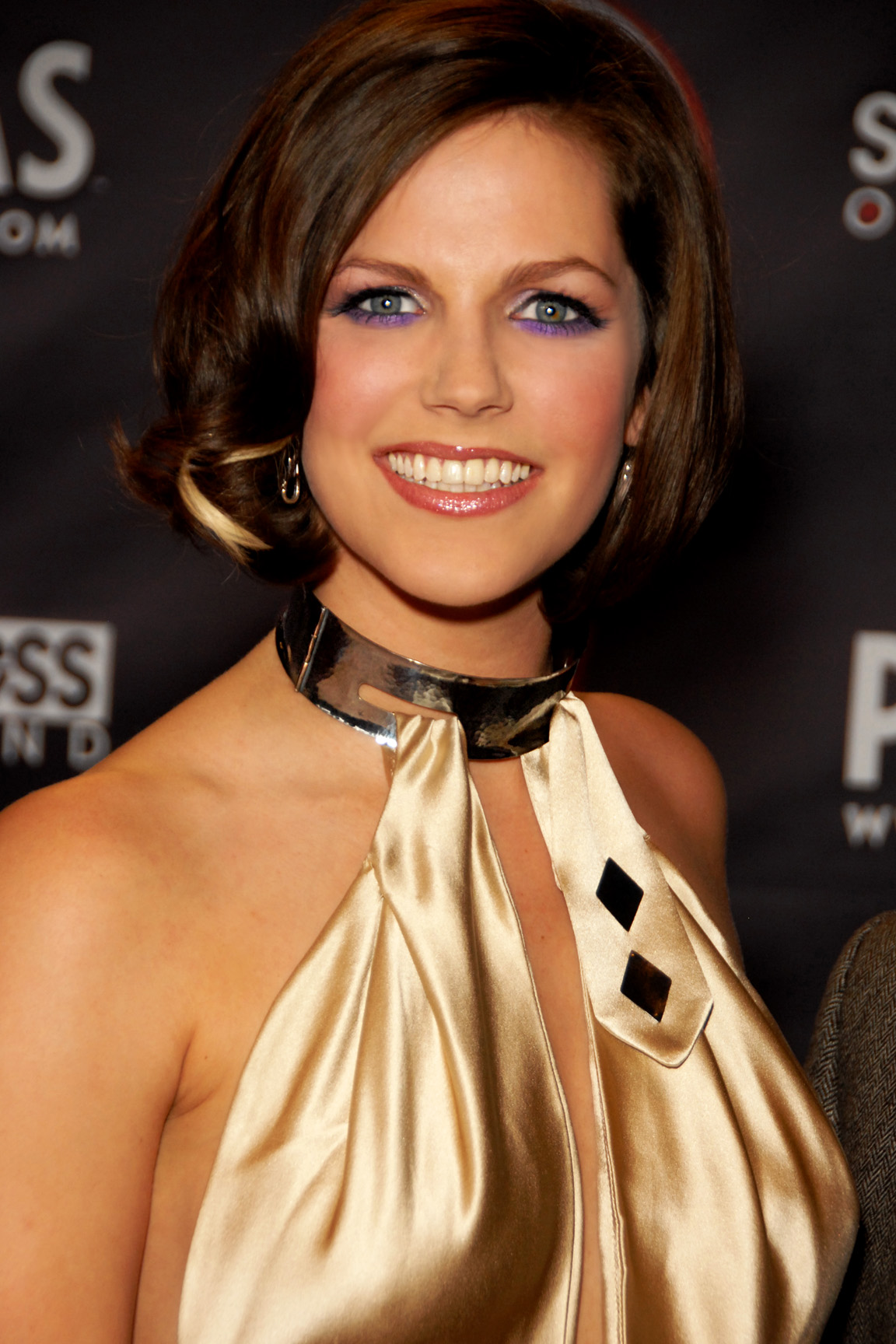
Bobbi Starr is a former adult film actress who won the AVN Award for Female Performer of the Year in 2012.

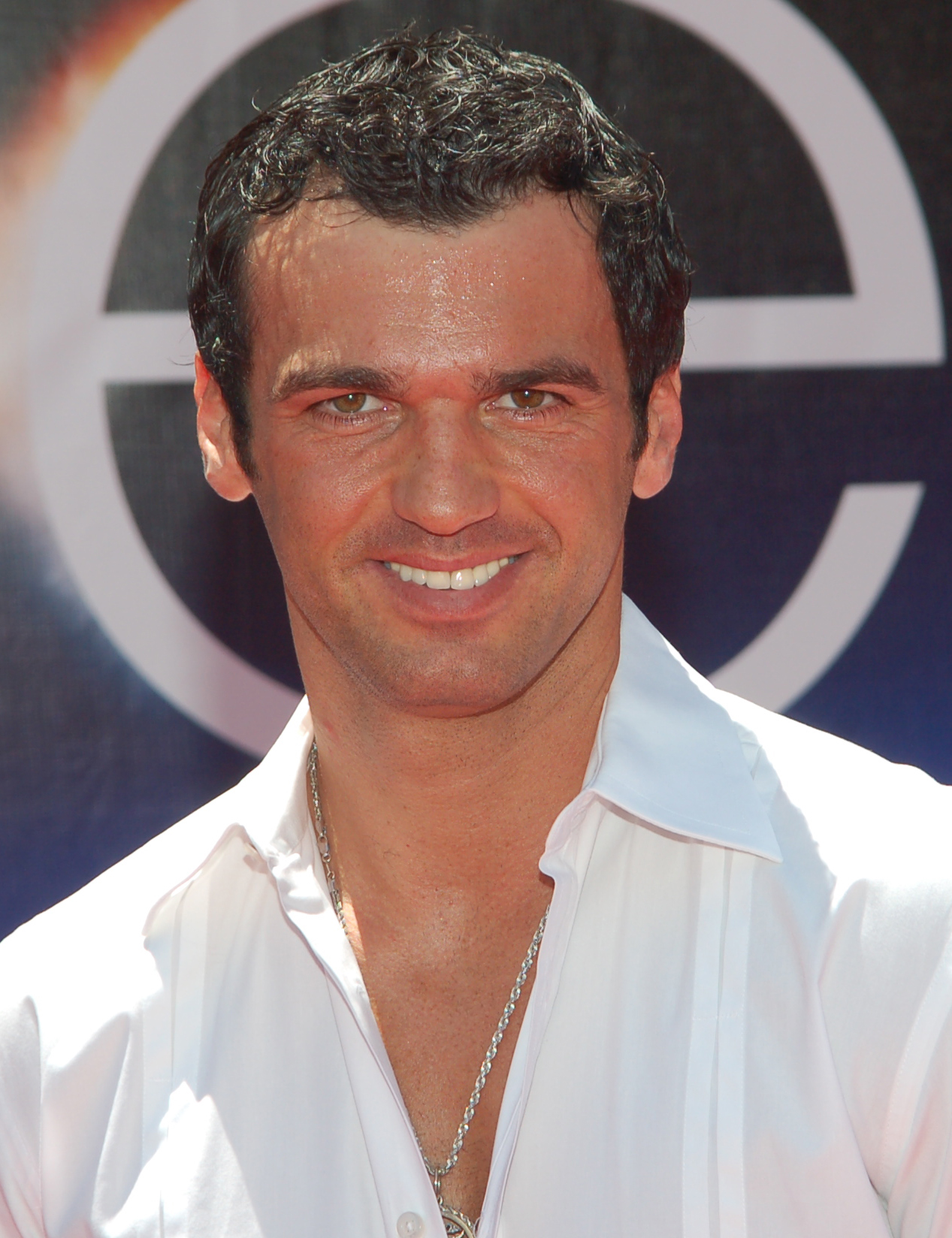
Tony Dovolani is a professional ballroom dancer known for his involvement in the television series Dancing with the Stars.

- Melinda Ademi – rapper
- Michael Bellusci – musician, drummer
- Big Body Bes – hip-hop artist
- Anita Bitri – singer
- Bleona – singer
- Action Bronson – hip-hop artist
- Kara DioGuardi – songwriter, television personality
- Kristine Elezaj – singer
- Gashi – rapper
- Anxhelina Hadërgjonaj – singer, fashion blogger, influencer
- Genta Ismajli – singer-songwriter, actress
- JMSN – singer-songwriter, producer
- Florina Kaja – singer, reality TV actress
- Paul Leka – songwriter, producer
- Ava Max – singer
- Thomas Nassi – musician, composer
- Enisa Nikaj – singer-songwriter, model
- Njomza – singer
- Steven Parrino – artist, musician associated with energetic punk nihilism
- Talip Peshkepia – film composer, songwriter
- Bebe Rexha – singer-songwriter
- Albert Stanaj – singer-songwriter
- Unikkatil – rapper

=== Artists ===
- Breanne Benson – pornographic actress
- Olivier Berggruen – art historian, curator; his maternal grandfather is Alessandro Moissi who is of Albanian origin
- Pema Browne – abstract artist
- Luke Burbank – radio host, correspondent, podcaster
- Drita D'Avanzo – television personality
- Tony Dovolani – professional ballroom dancer
- Bosch Fawstin – cartoonist
- Vasiliev Nini – sculptor
- George Pali – painter
- Regis Philbin – television host
- Bobbi Starr – pornographic actress
- Aureta Thomollari – luxury consultant
- Sislej Xhafa – artist
- Niko Pepaj - actor

== Literature ==
- Etel Adnan – poet, essayist, visual artist
- Costa Chekrezi – historian, publicist
- Daniela Gioseffi – poet, novelist, literary critic, essayist, performer
- Gjekë Marinaj – author, translator
- Betim Muço – writer, poet, translator, seismologist
- Tom Perrotta – novelist, screenwriter
- Ardian Vehbiu – author, translator

== Business and civil society ==
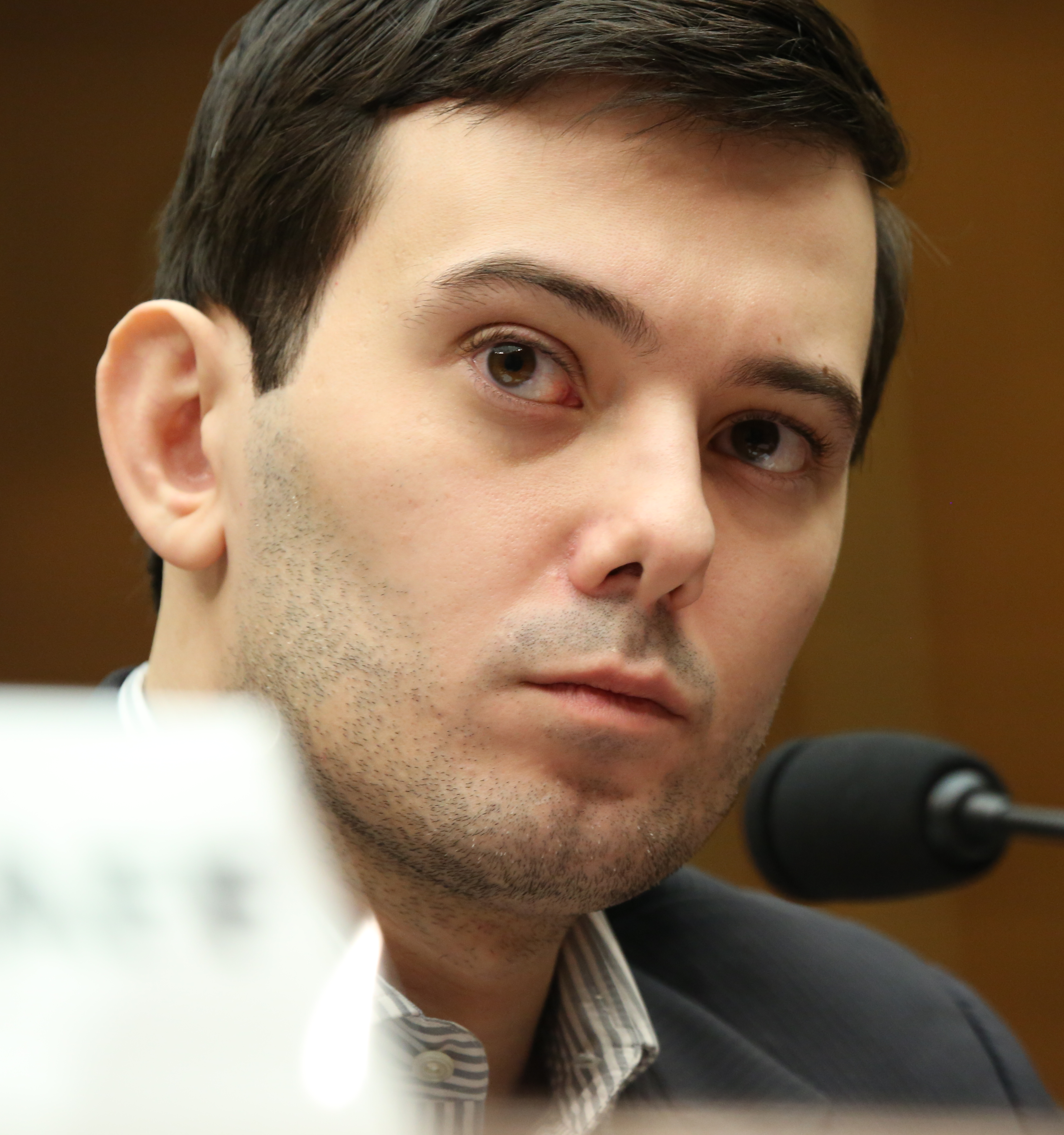
Martin Shkreli is a former hedge funds manager and business executive whose company Turing Pharmaceuticals was widely criticized for raising the price of the antiparasitic drug Daraprim.

- Anthony Athanas – restaurateur
- Ekrem Bardha – businessman, political activist
- Nicolas Berggruen – businessman
- Florin Krasniqi – businessman, politician
- Louis V. Mato – American politician and businessman
- James J. Schiro – businessman
- Martin Shkreli – businessman
- Ramiz Tafilaj – businessman, political activist
- Emin Toro – court judge
- Rexh Xhakli – businessman, political activist and philanthropist

== Media ==
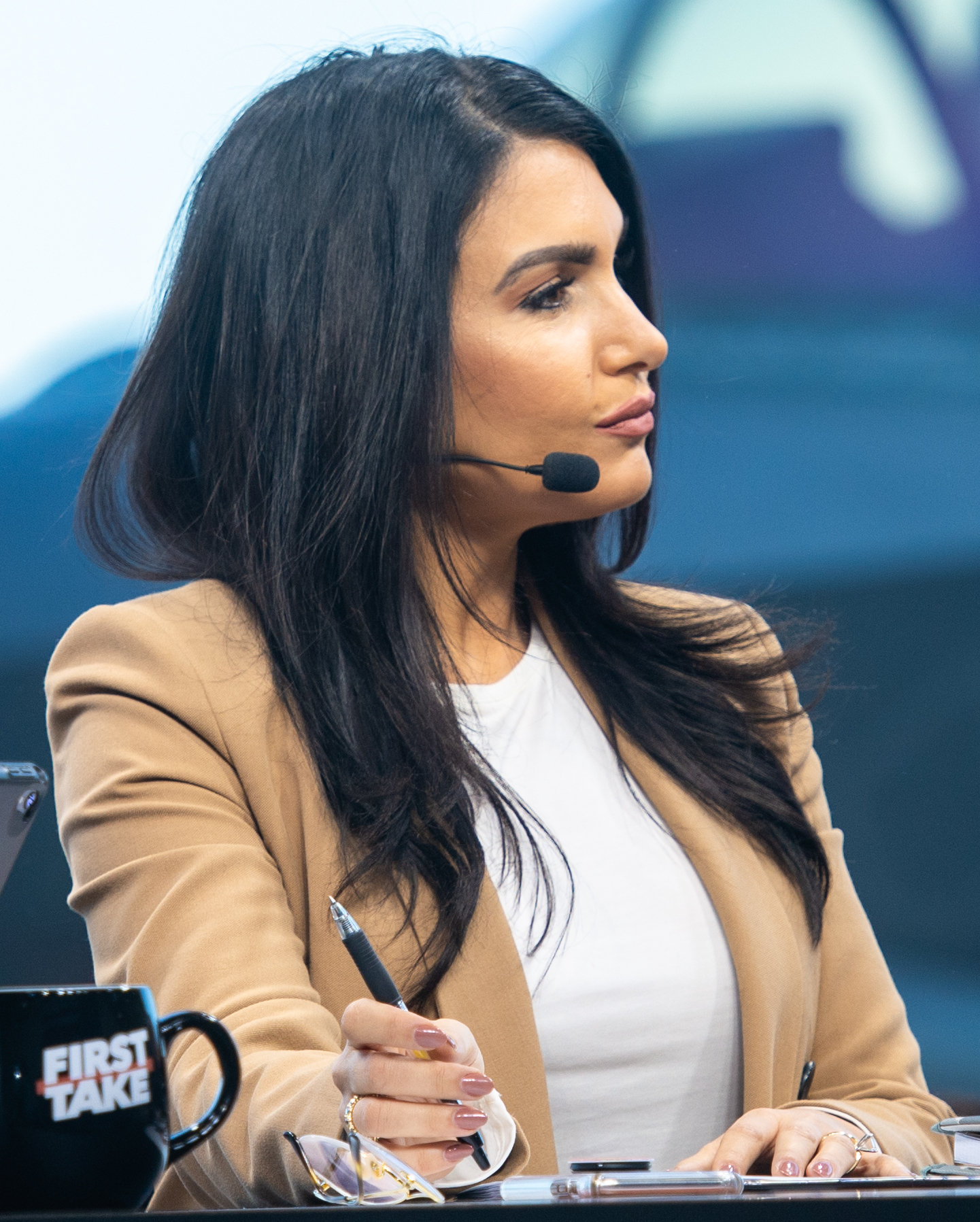
Molly Qerim is co-host of ESPN's morning talk show First Take.

- Andrew Kaczynski – journalist, political reporter for CNN
- Bill Kovach – journalist, editor
- Donald Lambro – journalist
- Eric Margolis – journalist, editor of the Toronto Sun; mother is Albanian
- Molly Qerim – moderator, reporter
- Iliriana Sulkuqi – journalist
- Nick Tosches – journalist, novelist, biographer, poet
- Nexhmie Zaimi – journalist

== Photography ==
- Fadil Berisha – photographer
- Emin Kadi – photographer, art director
- Gjon Mili – photographer for Life Magazine
- Burim Myftiu – photographer
- George Tames – photographer for The New York Times

== Modeling ==
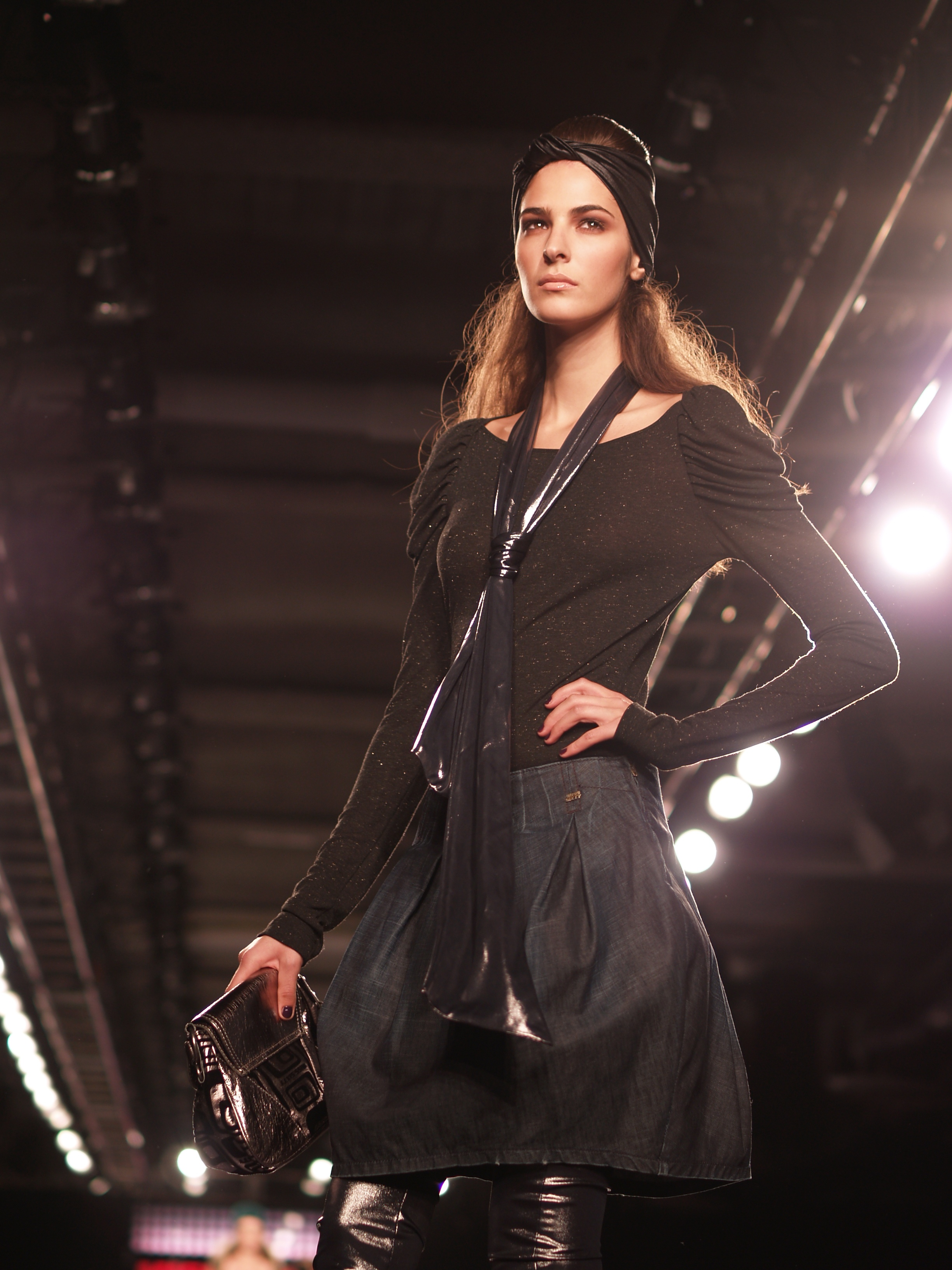
Emina Cunmulaj is a former supermodel who served as a telecast judge for the 72nd Miss USA pageant.

- Emina Cunmulaj – model
- Afërdita Dreshaj – model, singer, beauty queen
- Floriana Garo – television presenter, model
- Cindy Marina – television presenter, model, former volleyball player
- Angela Martini – model

== Sports ==
- Joe Albanese – baseball player
- Dominick Bellizzi – jockey
- Dilly Duka – soccer player
- Lee Elia – baseball player, coach, manager
- Sadri Gjonbalaj – soccer player
- Šaćir Hot – soccer player
- Halil Kanacević – basketball player
- Elizabeta Karabolli – shooting sport
- Robert Baggio Kcira – soccer player
- Frank Leskaj – swimmer
- Kristina Maksuti – soccer player
- Elvir Muriqi – professional boxer
- Aaron Palushaj – professional hockey player
- Andy Parrino – baseball player
- Vera Razburgaj – soccer player
- Max Rugova – soccer player
- Enkelejda Shehu – air pistol shooter
- Jaren Sina – basketball player
- Kristjan Sokoli – football player
- Donald Suxho – volleyball
- Andy Varipapa – professional trick bowler

== Religion ==
- Archbishop Nikon of Boston – OCA's bishop of Diocese of New England, locum tenens of Diocese of the South, and archbishop of American Albanian Archdiocese
- Baba Rexheb

== Others ==
- Joseph Ardizzone – mobster
- Zulfi Hoxha – terrorist
- Ismail Lika – mobster
- Zef Mustafa – mobster
- Sami Osmakac – convicted terrorist
- Nicolo Schiro – mobster
- John Alite – former mobster, author, youth motivational speaker and former associate of the Gambino crime family
