= Xhakli =

Xhakli is a surname. Notable people with the surname include:

- Haki Xhakli (born 1952), Kosovo Albanian painter
- Rexh Xhakli (1938–2020), Albanian American businessman
