= Albanian American Student Organization =

Albanian Student Organization

Albanian American Student Organization (AASO Global) Organizata e Studentëve Shqiptaro-Amerikan
Related ethnic groups
- Albanians; Albanian diaspora Albanian Canadian

The Albanian American Student Organization (AASO Global) (Albanian: Organizata e Studentëve Shqiptaro-Amerikan) is a non-profit organization established by Albanian-American students in Detroit, Michigan.

== Mission ==
AASO Global is dedicated to foster among the members a sense of comradery and support, promote cultural awareness and appreciation, and serve the community while promoting higher education. The organization hosts social events, fundraising efforts, volunteering events, leadership seminars, and networking opportunities.

== History ==
AASO Global was founded in Detroit, Michigan in 1998. The organization was initiated by Albanian-American students at Wayne State University. Their main objective was to promote fellowship among the Albanian-American students, along with other students around campus and to promote the preservation of Albanian heritage. Following the success of this chapter, other universities soon began to establish new chapters at their own college campuses.

== Gjergj Kastrioti Scholarship (GKS) Fund ==
The Gjergj Kastrioti Scholarship (GKS) Fund was founded in 1999 as an extension of the Albanian American Student Organization (AASO Global). The goal is to provide scholarship support to Albanian-American youth that demonstrate a need and/or has maintained a history of superior academic achievement. Gjergj Kastrioti Scholars must attend four-year Michigan colleges and universities.

== Mother Teresa Service Day ==
On September 26, 2009, the Albanian American Student Organization (AASO Global) organized the first annual Mother Teresa Service Day (MTSD) to honor Mother Teresa. MTSD is a day dedicated to community service in the Metro-Detroit area, honoring the Albanian Roman Catholic nun's legacy. The event occurs annually and has gathered hundreds of student volunteers from around the state of Michigan.

== Chapters ==
Connecticut

- University of Connecticut (ASA)

Texas

- North American College (AASOHTX)
- University of Houston (AASOHTX)

New York

- Iona College (New York) (AAS/AASO)

Pennsylvania

- Drexel University (ASO)

Michigan

- Wayne State University (AASO)
- University of Michigan – Dearborn (AASO)
- Michigan State University (AASO)
- Oakland University (AASO)
- University of Michigan – Ann Arbor (AASO)
- Grand Valley State University (AASO)
- University of Detroit Mercy (AASO)

Canada

- University of Toronto (ASU)

Australia

- Australian Albanian University Students Association (AAUSA)

== Notable alumni ==
- Erion Veliaj – Albanian politician, who is currently serving as the 42nd Mayor of Tirana, Albania.
- Suzanna Shkreli – Deputy Legal Counsel to Michigan Governor, Gretchen Whitmer. Former United States Congressional Candidate and Macomb County Assistant Prosecuting Attorney.
- Elizabeth Ivezaj – Miss Michigan 2014.

== Other ==
- Albanian Americans
- History of the Albanian Americans in Metro Detroit
- List of Albanian Americans
