= Ramiz Tafilaj =

Albanian-American businessman, philanthropist, activist and publisher (born 1949)

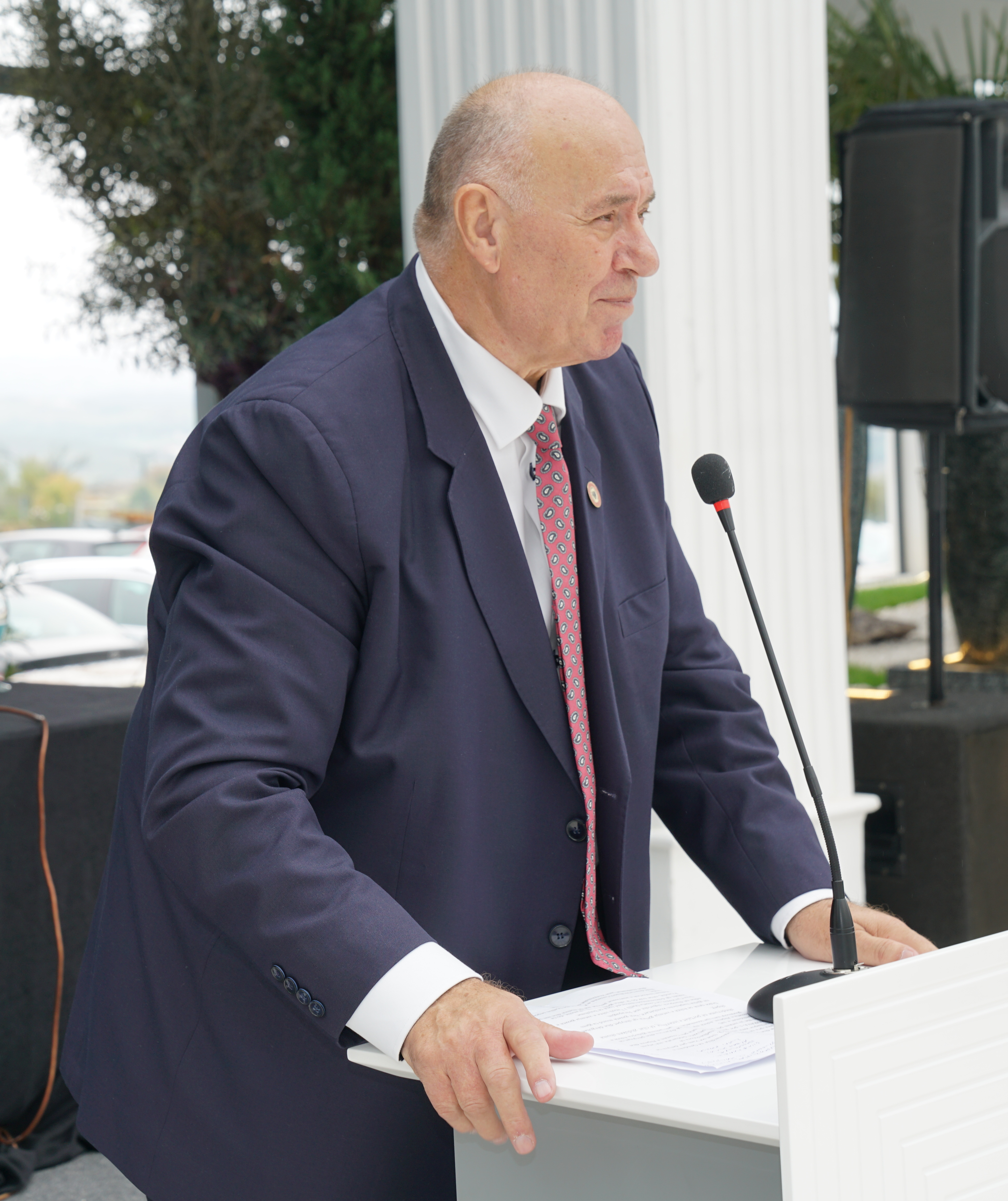
- Tafilaj in 2024
- Born: 6 May 1949 (age 77); Deçan, Yugoslavia (now Kosovo)
- Occupations: Businessman; philanthropist; activist; publisher
- Known for: Advocacy for the Albanian cause; founder of Jalifat Publishing
- Spouse: Diana Tafilaj
- Children: 3
- Awards: President's Lifetime Achievement Award (2018); Kalorës i Urdhrit të Skënderbeut (2008); other local and cultural honors

Ramiz Tafilaj (born 6 May 1949) is an Albanian-American businessman, philanthropist, activist, and publisher. He is known for his advocacy of Kosovo's independence and the Albanian transition to democracy.

== Early life ==
Tafilaj was born into a working-class family in Deçan, Yugoslavia. After beginning his studies at the University of Zagreb, he emigrated to the United States in 1974, where he completed his higher education in Houston, Texas.

== Philanthropy and activism ==
Tafilaj has supported Albanian mutual aid societies and fraternal organizations across the Balkans and in the United States. He advocates for Albanian political and cultural issues within US policy circles. Tafilaj founded the Jalifat Publishing Company, which has published works by Albanian authors including Jusuf Buxhovi, Hajredin Kuçi, Faton Bislimi, Avni Spahiu, and Nuhi Vinca.

== Honors and recognition ==
In 2018, Tafilaj was honored by United States President Donald Trump with the President's Lifetime Achievement Award, the highest civilian distinction given to individuals who have dedicated over 4,000 hours of volunteer service to their communities through service and civic engagement. He received honors from Deçan and the Mayor of Vushtrri for his scholarship programs and work promoting Albanian culture and history. In 2022, the Municipality of Pukë accorded him the title of Citizen of Honor for his contribution to the democratization of Albania and the liberation and independence of Kosovo. Tafilaj received the Mirënjohje award from the Albanian American Cultural Center. The award recognized his voluntary engagement in the Albanian-American community, as well as his cooperation with US institutions in Washington, DC. The award also acknowledged Tafilaj's philanthropy and publication ventures.

Tafilaj has also been recognized for his humanitarian work and contributions to education, including sponsoring over 100 Albanian students for university education in the United States and assisting them with integration into American society. In recognition of his contributions to education and humanitarian work, Tafilaj was awarded the title Akademik Mark Krasniqi and Krenaria e Alpeve Shqiptare.

In 2022, he was awarded the title Kalorës i Urdhrit të Skënderbeut (Eng: "Knight of the Order of Skanderbeg") by the President of Albania, Ilir Meta. Tafilaj received the Idriz Seferi award from municipality of Gjilan municipality and accolades from the Lidhja e Krijuesve Shqiptarë në Mërgatë and the Association of Independent Intellectuals.

== Personal life ==
Tafilaj married his wife, Diana, in the 1970s. They have three adult children: an entrepreneur, a vice president in the banking industry, and a nonprofit executive.
