= Albanians in New York City =

Ethnic group in New York City

There is a sizeable Albanian population in New York City. Albanians are mostly concentrated in the Bronx, however, they can be found throughout the city. Staten Island also has a large Albanian community. The region in the Bronx is also known by the name Little Albania. In Staten Island, Albanians are concentrated in Dongan Hills, Tompkinsville, New Dorp, and Grant City. According to the American Community Survey, New York City is home to 57,000 Albanian-Americans; however local Albanian foundation estimate it at 100,000 Albanians.

== Distribution ==
Pelham Parkway, Bronx has the highest concentrations of Albanians in NYC.

There are also Albanian communities in Westchester County, New York.

== History ==
Albanian workers settled in New York in the early 20th century. Many of them found work in shoe, glass, and textile factories and were initially from the southern regions of the country. A second wave of Albanians arrived after World War II. Many of them were refugees from the Communist regime of Enver Hoxha. These refugees came from all regions of Albania and settled mainly in New York. Albanians were attracted to the established Italian American communities of New York and often found work in Italian restaurants and Italian stores. Many Italian American restaurants and pizza parlors in New York City are owned and operated by Albanians.

== Language and cultural community ==
New York City Public Schools would start teaching Albanian language in the late 2010s; the language was offered to PS 105 in Morris Park, Bronx. Starting in 2024, Albanian language is taught at an Albanian and Montenegrin American cultural center to roughly 60 children in Ridgewood, Queens, NYC, entitled the "Fol Shqip School," and Mercy College is the only college known to be teaching Albanian courses in New York City.

== Notable New Yorkers of Albanian descent ==
- Action Bronson, rapper
- Gashi, rapper
- Mark Gjonaj, politician
- Peter Lumaj, attorney and candidate for the U.S. Senate in 2012
- Zef Mustafa, mobster
- Regis Philbin, television personality
- Bebe Rexha, singer and songwriter
- Alex Rudaj, mafia kingpin
- Martin Shkreli, financial investor and businessman

== See also ==
- Italians in New York City
