= AASOHTX =

Albanian American Student Organization Organizata Studentëve Shqiptaro-Amerikan
Related ethnic groups
- Albanians; Albanian diaspora Albanian Canadians

The Albanian American Student Organization of Houston Texas (AASOHTX) (Albanian: Organizata e Studetëve Shqiptaro-Amerikan e Houston Teksasit) is a non-profit organization that is established by Albanian students in the United States as part of the Texas Chapter of the AASO.

== Motto ==
"së bashku për atdhe"

== Goal ==
To help the local community by bringing together Albanian students and contribute to a better society while promoting Albanian values. The organization has Albanian unity at heart. Its purpose is to bring together Albanian students and teach them about leadership and teamwork while preserving the Albanian values and culture. The organization strives to make young Albanians into excelling, upstanding, ethical leaders.

== Purpose ==
The AASOHTx is organized exclusively for charitable, cultural, and educational purposes concerning the Albanian culture within the meaning of Section 501(c)(3) of the Internal Revenue Code, 1986, or the corresponding provision of any future federal law. Such purposes include but are not limited to:

(a) Promote Albanian culture

(b) Give leadership opportunities to the Albanian youth

(c) Networking opportunities

(d) Create comradeship

(e) Increase interest in Albanian culture

(f) Provide goodwill to the local community

(g) Preserve Albanian values

== Chapters and similar organizations ==
=== National ===
Michigan

- Wayne State University
- University of Michigan - Dearborn
- Michigan State University
- Oakland University
- University of Michigan - Ann Arbor
- Grand Valley State University

Pennsylvania

- Drexel University (ASO)

Connecticut

- University of Connecticut (ASA)

Texas

- North American College (AASOHTX)

=== International ===
Canada

- University of Toronto (ASU)

Australia

- University of Australia (AAUSA)
