= Jusuf Buxhovi =

Albanian author, journalist, intellectual and political activist

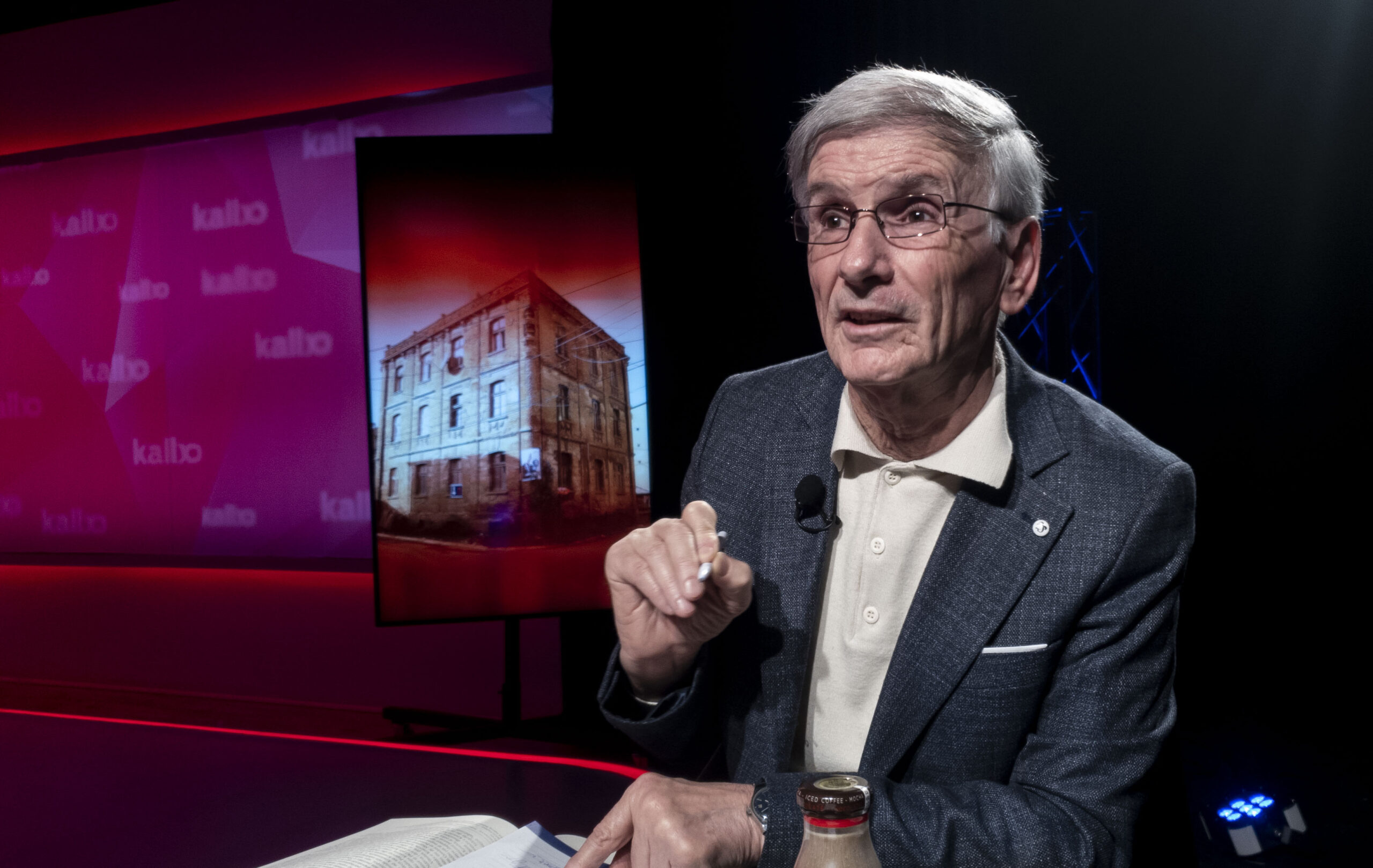
- Jusuf Buxhovi in an interview in Prishtina, Kosovo
- Born: 4 August 1946 (age 80); Pejë, Kosovo
- Citizenship: Kosovo
- Education: University of Prishtina
- Occupations: Journalist, Poet, Historian, Political activist
- Relatives: Aziz Buxhovi (father)
- Writing career
- Language: Albanian, Slovenian, English, French, Serbo-croatian
- Period: 1967 – present
- Notable awards: Annual Award of the Association of Kosovo Writers; 1985; Literary prize "Hivzi Sulejmani"; 1989; Annual Award of the Association of Kosovo Writers; 1991; National Award "Azem Shkreli" as the best work of the year 2006
- Movement: Postmodern literature, Historical literature, Histography
- Website: jusufbuxhovi.al

Jusuf Buxhovi (born 4 August 1946 in Pejë, Kosovo), is an Albanian author, journalist, intellectual, and political activist.

He grew up in the city of Gjakova where he also finished high school. In 1968 he graduated from the University of Prishtina with a degree in Albanian language and Literature. In 1979 he earned a master's degree in history from the University of Prishtina. His thesis discussed archived documents found in Germany which covered the Prizren League. His career in journalism started in 1967 with Kosovo's regional Rilindja newspaper, where he started writing for the cultural desk. Eventually he became editor of the entire paper. From 1976 to 2000 Jusuf was stationed in Bonn, Germany working as a news writer for Kosova's Rilindja newspaper.

Buxhovi has published the following books (as of October 2017):

1. "Cirku", tregime, "Rilindja" – 1972
2. "Pioni", tregime, "Rilindja" - 1975
3. "Matanëkrena" – roman, "Rilindja" - 1976
4. "Çaste" - "Rilindja" -1978
5. "Dinozauri" – "Rilindja" - 1979
6. "Shënimet e Gjon Nikollë Kazazit" – "Rilindja" - 1982
7. "Ura e Fshejit" – "Rilindja" - 1983
8. "Pranvera e zhveshur" - "Rilindja" - 1984
9. "Nata e shekujve" - "Rilindja" - 1985. (Won award of the Kosovo writer's association)
10. "Galeria e të vdekurve" - "Rilindja" - 1987
11. "Libri i të mallkuarve"- "Rilindja" -1989. ( Won award "Hivzi Sulejmani")
12. "Prapë vdekja 1" - "Rilindja" - 1991 (Won award of the Kosovo writer's association)
13. "Prapë vdekja 2" - "Rilindja" -1993
14. "Prapë vdekja 3" - "Rilindja" - 1995
15. "Qyteti i dënuar me vdekje"- "Faik Konica" - 2000
16. "Letrat për Kryeprincin"- "Faik Konica" - 2003
17. "Vdekja e Kolonelit" – , "Faik Konica" - 2004
18. "Vera e fundit e Gjin Bardhit" – roman, "Faik Konica" - 2004
19. "Kujtimet e zonjës Von Braun"- roman, "Faik Konica" - 2005
20. "Kodi i dashurisë"- roman, "Faik Konica" - 2006. (Won award "Azem Shkreli", as the best work of the year)
21. "Udhëtimi i Mendim Drinit"- roman, "Faik Konica" - 2006.
22. "Libri i Bllacës 1 - Shënime nga psikiatria" – trilogji, "Faik Konica" - 2007.
23. "Libri i Bllacës 2 - Bota e përmbysur e Urtakut" – trilogji,"Faik Konica" - 2007.
24. "Libri i Bllacës 3 - Etër e bij" – trilogji, "Faik Konica" - 2007.
25. "Fletëza gjermane" – publicistikë, "Faik Konica" - 2008.
26. "Kongresi i Berlinit 1878" – historiografi, "Faik Konica" - 2008.
27. "Libri i Gjakovës" – roman, "Faik Konica" - 2008.
28. "Kthesa historike 1 - Vitet e Gjermanisë dhe Epoka e LDK-së” – historiografi. Botoi “Faik Konica” – 2008.
29. “Jeta lakuriqe”, tregime. Botoi “Faik Konica” – 2009.
30. "Kthesa historike 2 - Shteti paralel dhe rezistenca e armatosur” – historiografi. Botoi “Faik Konica” – 2009.
31. ”Kthesa historike 3 - Lufta e Perëndimit për Kosovën” – historiografi. Botoi “Faik Konica”, 2009.
32. "Nga Shqipëria Osmane te Shqipëria Europiane”, historiografi. Botoi “Faik Konica”, Prishtinë, 2010.
33. “Kosova” I, II, III – historiografi. Botoi “Faik Konica” Prishtinë – “Jalifat Publishing” Houston, 2012.
34. “Jeniçeri i fundit”, roman. Botoi “Faik Konica” Prishtinë – “Jalifat Publishing” Houston, 2013.
35. “Dosja e hapur”, roman. Botoi “Faik Konica” Prishtinë –“Jalifat Publishing” Houston, 2014.
36. “Kosova” I-V, historiografi. Botoi “Faik Konica”- Prishtinë dhe “Jalifat Publishing”, Houston, 2015.
37. “Dosja B”, roman. Botoi “Faik Konica” Prishtinë – “Jalifat Publishing” Houston, 2016.
