= Rexh Xhakli =

Albanian American businessman, political activist, and philanthropist (1938–2020)

- Born: August 8, 1938; Fier, Albania
- Died: April 5, 2020 (aged 81); New Jersey, U.S.
- Occupations: Businessman, philanthropist
- Known for: Lobbying for Kosovo's independence and Albania's democratisation
- Awards: Honour of the Nation

Rexh Xhakli (August 8, 1938 – April 5, 2020) was an Albanian American businessman, political activist and philanthropist. He was an important figure of the Albanian-American community, who has had a prominent personal role in the historical lobbying for Kosovo’s fight for independence. In 2021 he was awarded "Honor of the Nation" Decoration posthumously by President of Albania which is the highest decoration to be given in Albania.

== Life ==
Rexh Xhakli was born in 1938 in Fier, Albania. He completed his early education in Ferizaj and Pristina in Kosovo, and then went on to study at the technical faculty in Zagreb, Croatia. He was forced to discontinue his studies in order to escape the persecution of Rankovic's government after being imprisoned by the Yugoslav secret police. In the mid-1960s he emigrated to the United States on political asylum, where he advocated for the end of communism in Albania and for the independence of Kosovo. His contributions to the National Albanian American Council (NAAC), the Albanian American Civic League (AACL), and other humanitarian organizations are well-recognised by the Albanian community. He was committed to pursuing protections for Kosovar refugees by providing housing and other material assistance.

== Activism ==
Xhakli founded the Albanian American lobby together with other leaders of the Albanian diaspora and future congressman Joe DioGuardi in the mid 1980s, which culminated in the establishment of the Albanian American Civic League (AACL) in January 1989. The lobby raised the issue of Albanian rights in Yugoslavia to the attention of U.S. policymakers in Washington. For more than twenty years, the organization has worked with the foreign policy leaders in the U.S. Congress, including Congressmen Ben Gilman, the late Henry Hyde, the late Tom Lantos, Dana Rohrabacher, and Ileana Ros-Lehtinen, Senators Charles Schumer and John McCain, and former Senators Joe Biden, Bob Dole, and Claiborne Pell, to bring independence to Kosovo, equal rights to Albanians in Macedonia, Montenegro, the Presheva Valley, and Chameria, and genuine democracy and economic development to Albania.

In 1990, Xhakli both attended and organised the diplomatic visit of U.S. congressman Tom Lantos to Albania, which was monumental for being the first visit of any U.S. high official since 1939 due to the country's former status as a hermit kingdom. Xhakli has met with American presidents George H. W. Bush and Bill Clinton as well as with state secretaries Hillary Clinton and Madeleine Albright.

In 2021, Xhakli was posthumously awarded the highest national medal in Albania, known as the Honor of the Nation Decoration, by President Ilir Meta.

== Philanthropy ==
Xhakli is widely known as a philanthropist within the Albanian community. In 2015, he and his wife donated €150,000 to NGO “Autizmi” to help to raise autism awareness in Kosovo and to assist local families with services. The donation was inspired by Xhakli's son who is autistic. The couple also organised multiple awareness and fundraising events both in New York and Pristina to further the cause.

== Honours and awards ==
- Albania: "Honor of the Nation" Decoration (2021)
