= Zef Mustafa =

American mobster

Zef J. Mustafa
- Born: 1961 (age 64–65); Trieste, Italy
- Occupation: Mobster
- Allegiance: Gambino crime family

Zef J. Mustafa is a former Albanian-American mobster associated with the Gambino crime family.

== Early life ==
Mustafa moved to the United States from Albania with his parents as an infant in 1962 to escape Enver Hoxha's Communist regime. When he was two years old, his mother died. His father died when he was 11. He was then placed in an orphanage, but eventually ran away and dropped out of school in the sixth grade. He was eventually taken in by a local family in the Arthur Avenue area of The Bronx, New York.

In 1986, he was alleged to have beaten a man to death with a Louisville Slugger baseball bat, but was not convicted as the key witness was a woman of ill-repute whose testimony was not convincing in court.

In 1993 he was convicted on charges that he tried to use a counterfeit birth certificate to obtain an American passport. His explanation for the fraud was that he needed the passport in order to make a trip to London, United Kingdom to open a business. He bought a fake blank birth certificate for $50 and tried to use that as he did not have a birth certificate of his own. It was only later, he insisted, that he found out that he had actually been born in a refugee camp in Trieste, Italy. He pleaded guilty to the charge and served one year on probation.

On 19 March 2000, when he was returning to the United States from a Caribbean cruise with his family, the immigration authorities challenged his right to remain as a permanent resident citizen in the U.S. The reason for this was his 1993 conviction of fraud in regards to his birth certificate. His status was still not settled when, in December 2002, he was incarcerated in an immigration detention center. However, a judge eventually ruled in his favor, despite his inability to give any details about his alleged business, which made him over $20 million between 1990 and 2001, and he was released in 2004. The following year, federal prosecutors in Brooklyn indicted him and others for telephone and internet pornography. Mustafa pled guilty to money laundering and was sentenced to up to five years in prison and a $1.7 million fine.

== Gambino crime family ==
Mustafa was a regular at the Ravenite Social Club, which was frequented by the Gambino crime family. He was spotted at the club by the FBI 115 times during a three year span in the 1980s.
