= George Pali =

Albanian-American painter

- Born: Gjergj Pali; 1957 (age 68–69); Shkodra, Albania
- Education: MFA
- Known for: Painting
- Notable work: NY, CT USA
- Movement: Contemporary

George Pali is an Albanian-American contemporary visual artist. George Pali is a painter born in Shkodra Albania. From 1976 - 1980 attended the ILA Instituti i Larte i Arteve Academy of Arts in Tirana, 1991 he graduated from Michigan State University, Studio Arts (MFA). He works and lives in Stamford CT in the United States as a free artist. Specialized in painting, collages and mosaics, after many exhibitions New York City, San Francisco, Miami, Bernardsville NJ, Cane, Nice, Florence, Tokyo art galleries and art events, in October 2013 he exhibited his works at the National Art Gallery of Albania, in an exhibition named "The Journey", and May 2015 "The Journey Continues" at the FAB Art Gallery (The Gallery of the Art Academy in Tirana, Albania).

Pali was into the creative arts from at very young age. His inclination was, however, not painting. He was more interested in music during childhood. Gradually, the young Pali began to move toward painting, a medium he says helped him express himself better than music.

Pali graduated with a BFA from the Institute of Arts in Tirana, Albania in 1980. He did not remain in his native country for long, fleeing in January 1988 due to political reasons and to escape the restrictions the authorities placed on artistic freedom. Pali emigrated that same year to the U.S. In America, he enrolled in the MFA degree at the Michigan State University. He graduated in 1991. Currently resides in Stamford, where his studio is.

== Exhibitions ==
Pali first exhibited his works as part of a group exhibition in Albania in 1980. He participated in group exhibitions regularly in Albania throughout the 1980s, until he fled the country. His first solo exhibition was in Michigan, at the Kresge Art Center, in 1991. He had exhibited at numerous American galleries, including Gallery 444, Design Domain Gallery, Coconut Grove Gallery, Art Essex Gallery, and Ward-Nasse Gallery.

== Awards ==
George Pali is the winner of the 2012 Leone'd'Oro dell'Arte (Golden Lion of Arts), Monte Carlo (Monaco).

== See also ==
- Modern Albanian art
