= Vera Razburgaj =

American–Albanian footballer

Personal information
- Date of birth: 6 August 1999 (age 27)
- Place of birth: United States
- Height: 1.75 m (5 ft 9 in)
- Position: Midfielder

Team information
- Current team: Vllaznia Shkodër
- Number: 23

Youth career
- 2012–2014: Michigan Hawks
- 2014: Michigan Jaguars
- 2015–: Vardar Soccer Club

College career
Years	Team	Apps	(Gls)
2017	Oakland Golden Grizzlies	18	(0)

Senior career*
Years	Team	Apps	(Gls)
2015–	Vllaznia Shkodër		
- * Club domestic league appearances and goals

Vera Razburgaj (born 6 August 1999) is an American-born Albanian footballer who plays as a midfielder who plays for Albanian club Vllaznia Shkodër.

== Early life ==
Razburgaj was raised in Novi, Michigan.
