= George Tames =

- Born: January 29, 1919; Washington, D.C., U.S.
- Died: February 24, 1994 (aged 75); Washington, D.C., U.S.
- Known for: Photography

George Tames (January 21, 1919 – February 23, 1994) was an American -Greek and Albanian ( Himara Region) photographer for The New York Times from 1945-1985. As a newspaper photographer, Tames was a regular on Capitol Hill over a span of forty years.

== Biography ==
Born in Washington, D.C., Tames was a first generation American child of Greek - Albanian immigrants who grew up not speaking English at home. He dropped out of high school in the tenth grade, and took a job as an officeboy in the Washington bureau of Time-Life to help out the family.

His career in photography began in 1940 in Washington D.C. Tames went with the Capitol Hill photographers on assignments and eventually photographed individual members. He photographed meetings of the Truman Committee. He developed access to and captured the likeness of numerous members of the United States Congress, and had his work reproduced in many influential publications. He developed a style contrary to the "herd instinct" of press photographers, demonstrating his artistic eye, sense of place, and special intimacy with his subjects.

== Photography ==
Tames took countless Washington shots, but (by his own admission) is particularly remembered for one, "The Loneliest Job," a photograph of President John F. Kennedy.

President Kennedy's iconic stance staring down at the table in front of him is all the more fascinating insofar as Kennedy was actually reading a copy of Tames' paper, The New York Times. Tames recalled later that Kennedy was reading a column by editorial columnist Arthur Krock on the table in front of him by the window of the Oval Office.

Tames' daughter, Stephanie, recalls in an August 2010 essay for Salon the story of this enduring and iconic photograph by her father:

"By the way, the morning my father made the picture of JFK at the window, the president was reading the Times. He had gotten to the editorial page. My father said, 'He looked over and he saw me. He hadn't been aware that I took that picture from the back, but he saw me when I moved to the side there. He glanced over at me, and he said: "I wonder where Mr. Krock gets all the crap he puts in this horseshit column of his." Apparently he was much upset about Mr. Krock's column that day.'"

As he explained in an interview late in life, Tames took the photograph through the door of the Oval Office, after Kennedy thought he had left:

President Kennedy's back was broken during the war, when that torpedo boat of his was hit by the Japanese destroyer. As a result of that injury he wore a brace on his back most of his life. Quite a few people didn't realize that. Also he could never sit for any length of time, more than thirty or forty minutes in a chair without having to get up and walk around. Particularly when it felt bad he had a habit, in the House, and the Senate, and into the Presidency, of carrying his weight on his shoulders, literally, by leaning over a desk, putting down his palms out flat, and leaning over and carrying the weight of his upper body by his shoulder muscles, and sort of stretching or easing his back. He would read and work that way, which was something I had seen him do many times. When I saw him doing that, I walked in, stood by his rocking chair, and then I looked down and framed him between the two windows, and I shot that picture. I only made two exposures on it--we were very conservative with our film. Then I walked out of the room and stood there for a while, then I saw him straighten up. I went in again and I photographed him straight up, for a different shot, from the back, then I walked around to the side and photographed him profile, right and left. He had a copy of the New York Times, he was reading the editorial page--and I have that print right here, I was looking at it just the other day. He looked over and he saw me. He hadn't been aware that I took that picture from back, but he saw me when I moved to the side there. He glanced over at me, and he said: "I wonder where Mr. Krock gets all the crap he puts in this horseshit column of his." Apparently he was much upset about Mr. Krock's column that day. So that was the occasion of that picture.

Tames' work is the subject of an exhibit at the Averitt Center for the Arts in Statesboro, Ga, which opened on Friday, May 6, 2011. Featured in the exhibit is Tames' "The Loneliest Job" as well as photographs from President Franklin D. Roosevelt through President George H.W. Bush. The New York Times' Jim Mones attended the opening reception of the Averitt Center's exhibit and delivered remarks on Tames' career and his work for the newspaper.

== Quotations ==
- "'Why are you a Democrat?' I say, 'I was born into the Democratic party, the same way I was born into the Greek Orthodox Church.'"
- "If there is anyone that should be a Republican or an ultra conservative, it's me, because I have not only conquered the fact that I had only a tenth grade education, but based on the friendships that I made, and the betting on people, like Mr. J. Willard Marriott."
- "My mother's reference to Roosevelt would be "ieous", (Greek άγιος)which is the Greek word for saintly, Saintly Roosevelt. She would refer to Hoover as "garata," (Greek (κερατάς) which means someone with horns, like a goat. So that's how I reckoned my own feelings. Then also in every Greek Orthodox family there's a holy corner, usually in the bedroom of the parents, and it faces east."
