= Faton Bislimi =

Kosovar activist

Faton H. Bislimi (born 12 February 1983) is an Albanian activist and politician from Kosovo. He served as a member of the Kosovo parliament in 2020.

Bislimi was born in Gjilan, Socialist Federal Republic of Yugoslavia now Kosovo. He graduated summa cum laude from Texas Lutheran University with a B.S. in computer science and a B.A. in math, while later received his Master's in Public Administration and International Development from Harvard University. During his studies at TLU and Harvard, Bislimi wrote for the Albanian daily Bota Sot and closely cooperated with Joseph DioGuardi of the Albanian-American Civic League as well as with other American congressmen who have supported Kosovo.

Bislimi is the author of two books, a compilation of math problems and a series of journalistic writings titled Në Rrugëtim me Kosovën: Tatëpjetat dhe të Përpjetat, published at Houston in 2006 by Ramiz Tafilaj's Jalifat Publishing. Critics have valued the latter as a "manifestation of two figures in a joint harmony: one is the power of Bislimi's thought, and the other is the perspicuity of his rare writings."

Faton Bislimi founded The Bislimi Group with the aim of offering better education opportunities to Kosovar students. TLU awarded 13 full scholarships for undergraduate studies through The Bislimi Group.

Faton Bislimi lost his bid as an independent candidate in the 2007 mayoral elections in Gjilan. Bislimi was recently shortlisted to become Kosovo's first ambassador to the United States. Kosovo's president, however, appointed Avni Spahiu, the former Charge D'Affaires in Washington to become Kosovo's ambassador to the U.S.

Bislimi taught as an adjunct professor at two local colleges in Pristina--American University in Kosovo and Victory University College. While working for the UNDP, he co-founded the Kosovo Public Policy Center and oversaw the publication of a scholarly journal.

Recently, he acquired another master's from Dalhousie University in Canada and taught at a local school. He is working towards a PhD from Dalhousie.
