= History of Albanians in Maine =

In the early 20th century, the United States mill industry began recruiting weavers from Southern Mediterranean countries skilled in patterns new to American consumers. Many men from Albania and Turkey left their homelands to work the mills of Southern Maine.

The Pepperell Counting House was a factory in Biddeford, Maine that is thought have served as a mosque for early Albanian immigrants to the New England mill industry around 1900. Turks also came to southern Maine around this time period, many of them settling around the York Manufacturing Company in nearby Saco, Maine. They came to Maine, as most immigrants did, without much money and with little earning power. They are believed to have lived on campus at the mills and rarely ventured off. By 1915, it is believed that a large enough community of men came to the Pepperell Counting House that the formation of an early mosque occurred. However, it is believed that the Spanish flu swept through the area with the returning U.S. soldiers in 1918, killing many of the towns inhabitants, including many of the Muslims.

The Pepperell Counting House, the location of the Biddeford mosque, still stands today and is now owned by WestPoint Stevens.

Today, the Albanian community of Maine is just a scant 0.03% of Maine’s population, much lower than Northeast states such as New York, Connecticut, New Jersey, and Massachusetts which are all 0.2-0.4% Albanian. 450 people were counted as Albanian American in Maine according to Zipatlas, which contains undated Census data from the 2010s and 2020s. 90 Albanians live in Portland, Maine (0.15%; higher than the rest of the state). There are also small communities with disproportionate rates of Albanians, like Kennebunk (65; 1% of its population) and Sanford (50; 0.2%).

== Woodlawn Cemetery and Muslim Burial Ground ==
Evidence of the Muslim community in Biddeford in the early twentieth century is found mostly in the Woodlawn Cemetery on West Street in Biddeford. When visiting the cemetery today, it is noticeable that the tombstones in this part of the cemetery face a different direction than other sections of the cemetery. The Muslim burial ground has headstones facing Mecca. Some headstones have an engraving of the star and crescent, symbolizing Islam. Other grave markers note that the deceased was an "Albanian Muhamedan", meaning a follower of Muhammad, a Muslim.

== Death Records of Biddeford's Muslim community ==
There are death records of a few Albanian men who worked in the mills and remained in the Biddeford area. While there is no mention of their religious background, the records note that the deceased were born in Albania. One death record even notes that the deceased was a member of the York County Albania society, which may signify that the few Albanians continued to maintain a sense of community-heritage.
