= Albanian Americans =

Americans of Albanian birth or descent

- The language spread of Albanian in the United States as of the 2000 census.

Total population
- United States 224,000 (2024) (0.07% of the US population)

Regions with significant populations
- New York City; Philadelphia; Jacksonville; Tampa Bay; Detroit; Chicagoland; Waterbury; Dallas-Fort Worth; Greater Boston; Stamford
- New York: 52,000
- Michigan: 30,200
- Massachusetts: 21,300
- Ohio: 4,000-20,000
- Illinois: 15,300
- Connecticut: 12,000
- New Jersey: 15,500
- Pennsylvania: 10,000
- Florida: 16,000
- California: 2,204
- Texas: 7,000

Languages
- Albanian; English

Religion
- Christianity • Islam

Albanian Americans (Albanian: shqiptaro-amerikanët) are Americans of full or partial Albanian ancestry and heritage in the United States. They trace their ancestry to the territories with a large Albanian population in the Balkans and southern Europe, including Albania, Kosovo, Italy, Serbia, North Macedonia and Montenegro. They are adherents of different religions and are predominantly Muslims and Christians, while some are irreligious.

In 2024, there were 224,000 counted people of Albanian descent living in the United States, mostly in the Northeast and the Great Lakes region. This is a major increase since 1990, when there were only 47,710 Albanians in the U.S. The figure includes all people affiliated with the United States who claim Albanian ancestry, both those born in the country and naturalized citizens, as well as those with dual citizenship who affiliate themselves with both cultures.

People of Albanian descent are often concentrated in the Greater Philadelphia, Greater Boston, Metro Detroit, Chicagoland, New York City, and Waterbury, Connecticut areas. About three-quarters of the Albanian American population lives in the aforementioned Eastern U.S. states (52,000 in New York State, 30,000 in Michigan, 21,000 in Massachusetts, 16,000 in Florida, 15,000 in Illinois, 15,000 in New Jersey, and 12,000 in Connecticut).

There are also smaller, yet sizable communities within the Midwest such as Greater Cleveland, and Kenosha and Milwaukee, and as well as smaller East Coast communities like that of in the Washington, D.C. metropolitan area that encompasses Northern Virginia and Maryland. Tampa and Jacksonville, Florida also have sizeable Albanian communities. West of the Mississippi River, there are smaller ethnic Albanian communities in Dallas-Fort Worth, Houston, Phoenix, and San Diego areas.

== History ==
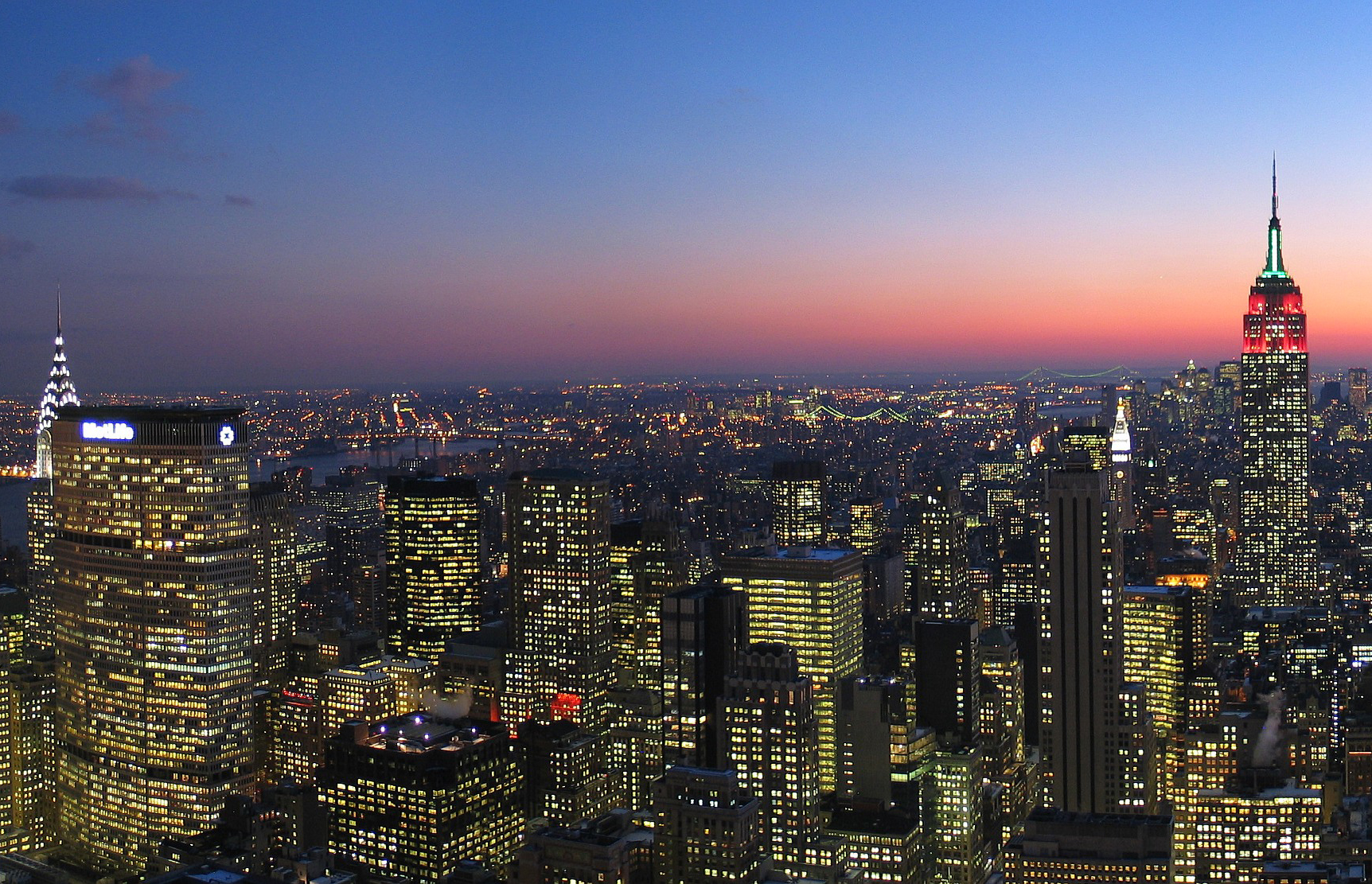
The New York City Metropolitan Area is home to by far the largest Albanian population in the United States.

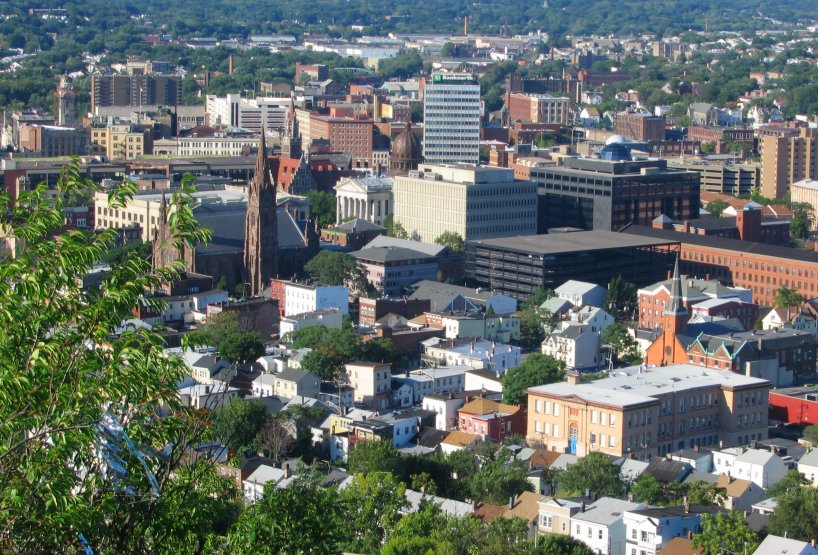
Paterson, New Jersey, is home to the second largest Albanian American population, after New York City.

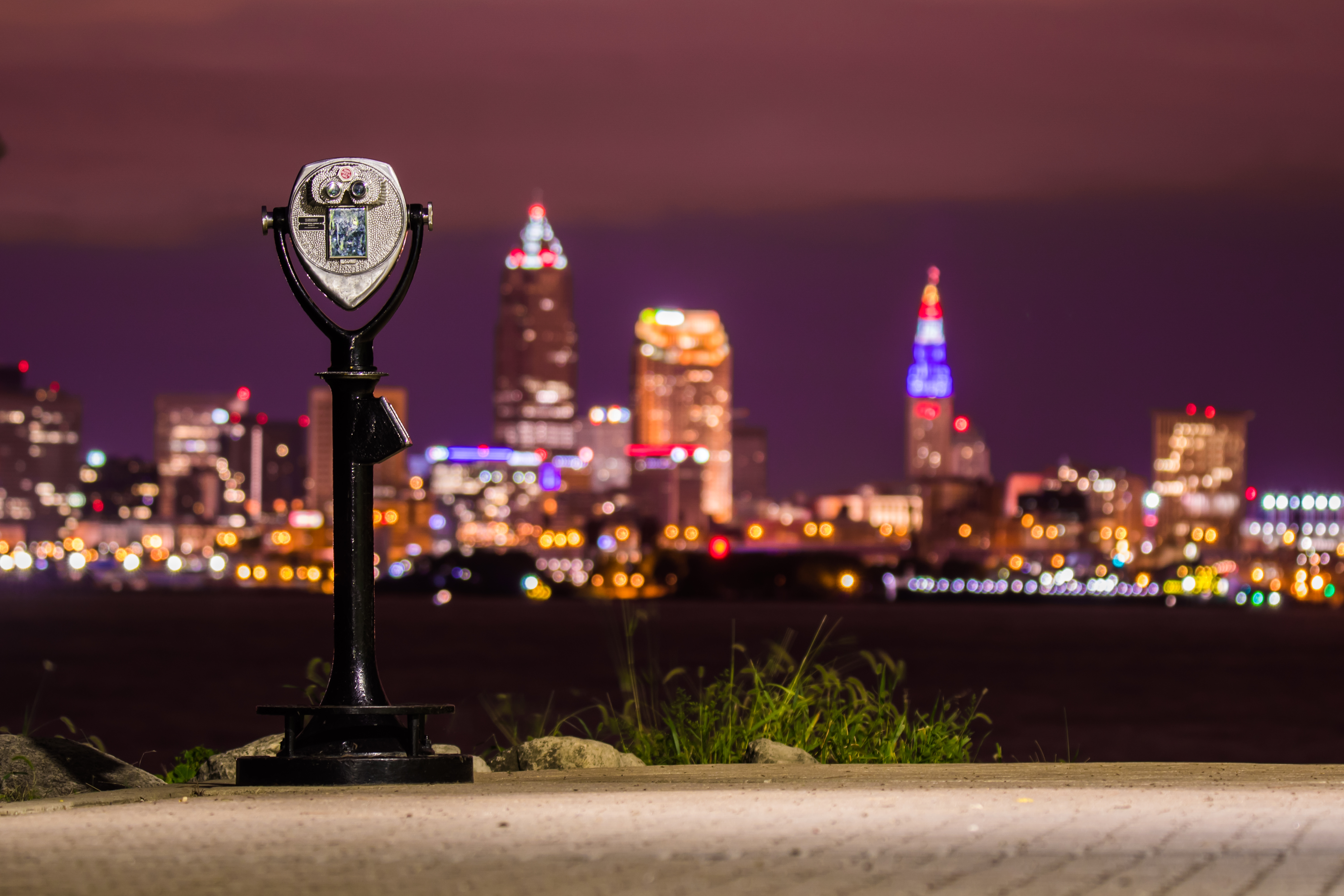
Lakewood, Ohio and the West Side of Cleveland are home to a significant Albanian population.

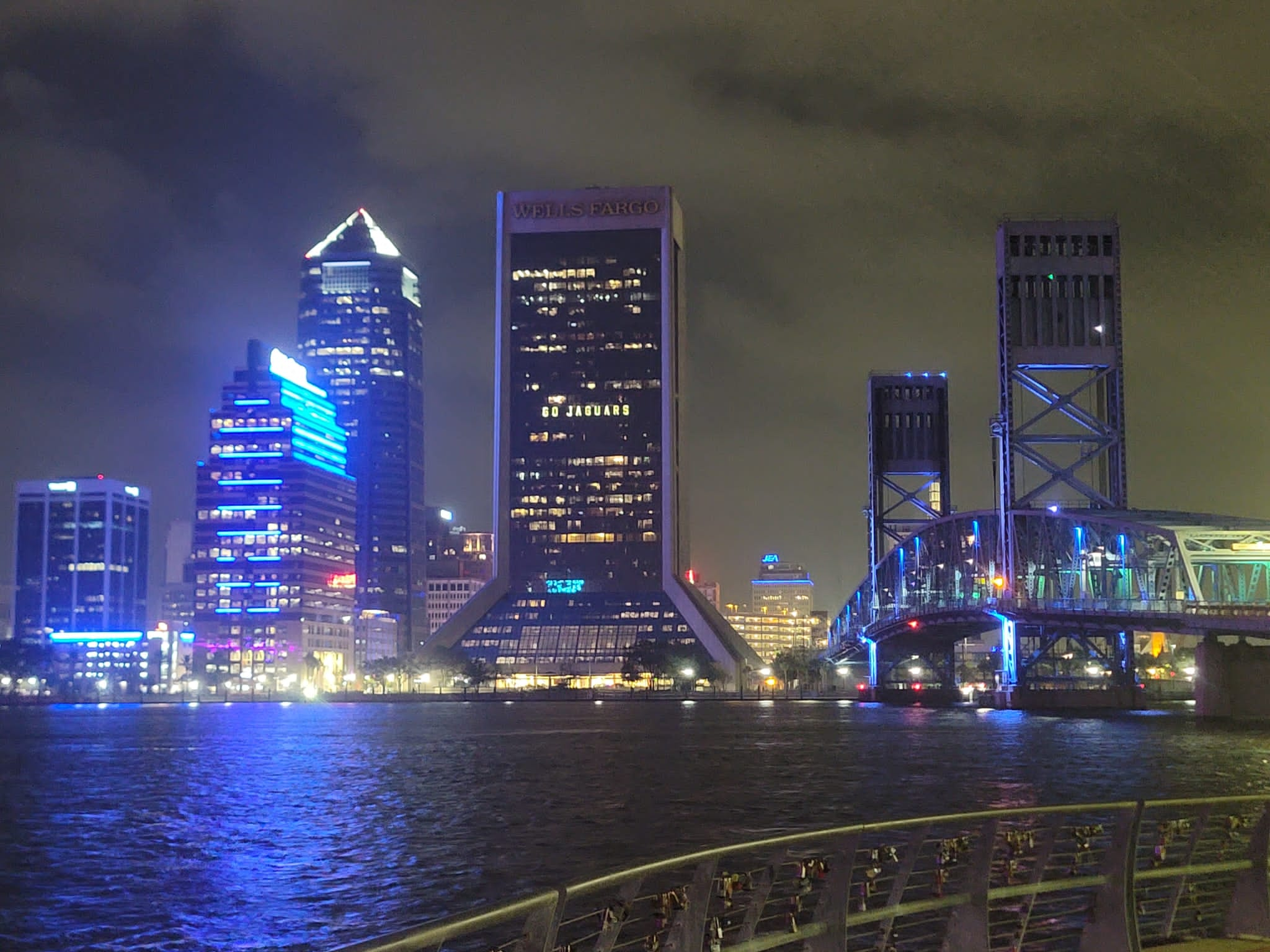
Jacksonville is home to the most Albanian Americans in the state of Florida.

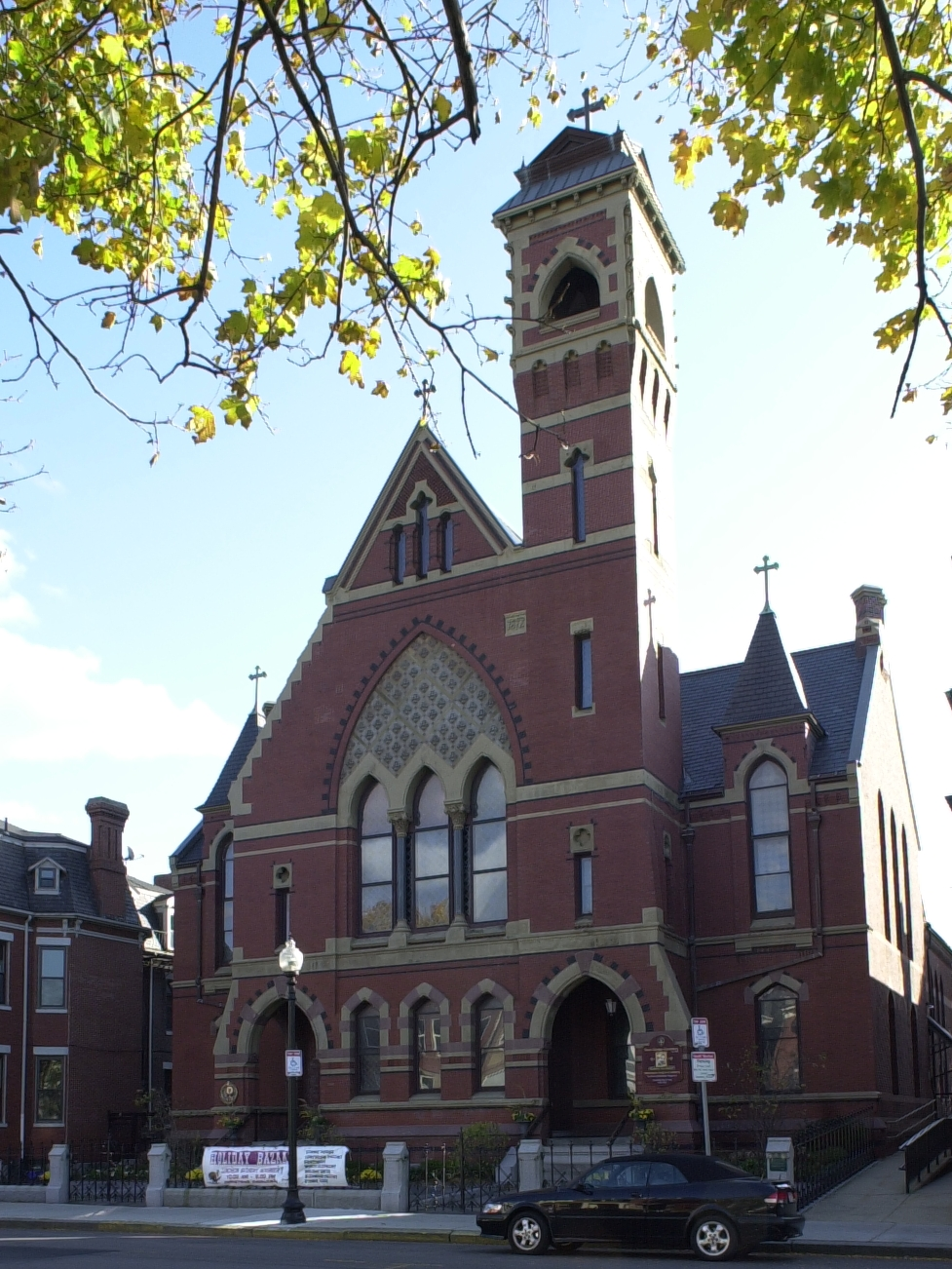
The Albanian Orthodox cathedral of St. George in South Boston, Massachusetts.

Kolë Kristofori, who later changed his name to Nicholas Christopher, was the first Albanian migrant in the United States. Originally born in Korçë, Christopher arrived in Boston in 1876 as a priest. After some time, he left the US for Korçë to encourage immigration, and returned with 17 other men in 1892.

To avoid service in the Turkish War during the late 19th century, due to Albania being under the rule of the Ottoman Empire, Albanians would arrive in the U.S., namely to Chicago, Boston, and New York. The first Albanian documented to have emigrated to the United States was Kolë Kristofori (English: Nicholas Christopher), who landed in Boston in the early 1880s and is remembered as the pioneer of the Albanian ethnic group in the U.S. It was not until the 1900s that large numbers of Albanians reached the U.S. East Coast: most of them were young bachelors from southern Albania.

In addition to the Boston and Chicago areas, large numbers of Albanians would make their home in the N.Y.C. area, especially in the Bronx. Workers settled in New York in the early 20th century, many of whom would find work in shoe, glass, and textile factories. A second wave of Albanians arrived after World War II, and many of them were refugees from the Communist regime of Enver Hoxha. These refugees came from all regions of Albania and settled mainly in New York. Albanians would also be instrumental in the pizzeria and restaurant industry in New York, Boston, Chicago, and other metropolises.

In 1912, Albanians began arriving in the Detroit area. At the time there were groups in east Detroit, northwest Detroit, and Grosse Pointe. The early settlers originated from southern Albania, but they were recorded as being from Greece, Turkey, or from the country in which they boarded their boats to the United States. Many had initially lived in New York and New England, but moved to Detroit by the 1910s.

The majority of this first wave of emigrants, approximately 10,000, did not intend to permanently settle in the U.S., and went back to Albania after World War I. Meanwhile, the post-WWII group of emigrants from Albania reached the U.S. The second group settled and intermarried in their new country. The number of Albanians that reported the Albanian language as their mother tongue in 1920 was around 6,000.

=== Post-World War II ===
After World War II the Albanians who emigrated to the U.S. were mostly political emigrants, and by 1970 the figure rose to around 17,000.

Following the Expulsion of Cham Albanians from Greece in the aftermath of World War II, many of them migrated to the United States, asserting that the Communist government in Albania discriminated against and persecuted them. They managed to retain their traditions and language, and created in 1973 the Chameria Human Rights Association which later merged and became Albanian American Organization Chameria which aimed to protect their rights. (see Cham Albanians).

Allowing for the families that had abandoned their mother tongue, it is estimated that around 70,000 US citizens with an Albanian background lived in the US in 1980.

In the 1990s, many Albanians from Albania, Montenegro, Kosovo and the Republic of North Macedonia emigrated to the United States as refugees of war. Another Albanian American (Kosovan-Americans) community in the Riverside/San Bernardino area of California includes Kosovo Albanians who entered the United States at the March Joint Air Reserve Base in Riverside.

A wave of mass immigration came in 1992 with the breakup of Yugoslavia and it continued in the 1990s. Some ethnic Albanian Catholics from Montenegro entered the United States from Mexico and settled in Detroit.

=== Arbëreshë Americans ===
Some of the first ethnic Albanians to arrive in the United States were immigrants from Italy who descended from a group of Albanians known as the Arbëreshë. The Arbëreshë were a group of Albanians who fled to the Kingdom of Naples and to the Kingdom of Sicily in the 15th century to avoid invasion by the Ottoman Empire.

This group of Albanians is distinguishable from other Albanian Americans due to their Italianized names, as well as their Albanian Greek Catholic religion. Nevertheless, Arbëreshë have a strong sense of identity, and are unique in that they speak an archaic dialect of Tosk Albanian called Arbëresh, which does not have any Ottoman influence.

Greater New Orleans has a history of an Arbëreshë community, mostly descended from 19th century Sicilian immigrants. Oftentimes, wherever there are Italians, there are a few Arbëreshë mixed with them. Arbëreshë Americans, therefore, are often indistinguishable from Italian Americans due to being assimilated into the greater Italian American community.

== Population ==
=== Demographics ===
The top 10 cities in the United States that have the most Albanian Americans.

Cities	Number of Albanian Americans
New York, NY	39,471
Philadelphia, PA	5,187
Jacksonville, FL	3,812
Sterling Heights, MI	3,331
Worcester, MA	3,315
Yonkers, NY	3,012
Waterbury, CT	3,012
Quincy, MA	1,894
Chicago, IL	1,768
Boston, MA	1,550

Albanians tend to live in the Upper South, the Midwest, and the Northeast. The Albanian community is generally concentrated in the Northeast, with populations mostly in New York City, Yonkers area, Waterbury, Connecticut area, Philadelphia, Boston and nearby Quincy. There are some Albanian communities in Florida, mainly in the Jacksonville area. The main other Albanian communities are in the Midwest, such as in Metro Detroit, Michigan, and Chicagoland. There are few Albanian communities elsewhere, with a small population in California and a slightly higher proportion in Texas, especially Dallas.

=== East Coast ===
With over 60,000 Albanian-Americans, the largest community is in New York which serves as an important pillar of the Albanian community. 0.3% of New York State reports Albanian ancestry, and about 0.5% of NYC residents report Albanian ancestry. There is a concentrated Albanian community around the Bronx, especially around Belmont, Bedford Park, Morris Park, as well as also in Staten Island, which is nearly one percent Albanian. Parts of Westchester County such as Yonkers and White Plains are rife with Albanian people, both having over 2,000 and 1,000 Albanians each, respectively.

The New Jersey cities of Garfield, Clifton, Elmwood Park, and Lodi all bear over 500 Albanians each.

The Greater Philadelphia Area of Pennsylvania is rife with Albanian-descended persons. Philadelphia city proper, as well as the suburbs of Progress and Berwyn are over 2% Albanian ethnically, and Philadelphia has over 5,000 Albanians in residence; 0.3% of the city's population.

The DMV area encompassing D.C., Virginia, and Maryland, has several thousand Albanians: many reside in Fairfax County, Virginia (1,000; 120 in Dulles Town Center; 100 Floris; 100 in Oakton, and several dozen in other various cities and communities within the county), Arlington County, Virginia, Loudoun County, Virginia, Montgomery County, Maryland, and Washington, D.C. itself has an Albanian American proportion that is slightly higher than the American figure of 0.06% (D.C.'s is 0.08%).

Massachusetts has a large Albanian population, especially in the communities of Worcester, which has 3,000 Albanians, and Quincy with over a thousand. In Connecticut, you can find Albanian-American communities in Waterbury, Southington, and Watertown.

=== Midwest ===
Flag used by the Albanian community in the US during the 1970s.

Some 30,000 live in Michigan, about 20,000 live in Massachusetts, approximately 4,000 live in Ohio (in Greater Cleveland, especially Lakewood and the West Side of Cleveland), 14,500 live in Illinois and about 13,000 live in Connecticut. The three largest communities (New York, Michigan and Massachusetts) account for 58% of the total Albanian-American population. Michigan has an Albanian American percentage for the state recorded at 0.4%, higher than New York's at 0.3%; thus having Michigan having the highest percentage of Albanian Americans of any state.

Hamtramck, Michigan is 3% ethnically Albanian. There are 5,000 Albanians in Macomb County, and several thousand in Wayne County. While few live in the Detroit city proper, many live also in the suburbs such as St. Clair Shores and Farmington Hills. (See History of the Albanian Americans in Metro Detroit).

Chicago has a large population of Albanians; the state of Illinois has over 15,000 Albanians, and 3,000 reside in Chicago proper. Exurban communities like Minooka have abundant Albanian populations. Milwaukee also has a sizeable Albanian community, while Wisconsin's total Albanian population is estimated at 5,000 strong.

There is a sizable Albanian population in Missouri, especially in Greater St. Louis; the town of Bella Villa, which also has a large population of another Southern European ethnic group (Bosnian Americans), is 4% Albanian. There are 1,200 Albanians in St. Louis County.

=== South ===
Jacksonville has the most Albanian Americans in Florida with 3,812 Albanians, having almost 1/4 of all Albanian Americans in Florida and 1.76% of all Albanian Americans. Jacksonville's population is 0.4% Albanian by ancestry. Clearwater, in the Tampa area, has 900 Albanian residents, almost one percent of its population, as well as an Albanian Islamic mosque. There is also another Tampa-area Albanian mosque located in Dunedin, which has served as a place of worship for the Pinellas County Albanian Muslim community since 1996.

Nearby St. Petersburg has 500 Albanians, Spring Hill has 400, Gainesville has 400, Egypt Lake-Leto has 350, and Palm Harbor has 300. Collectively, the Tampa Bay Area has 3,344 Albanians, making it Florida’s second largest Albanian community after Jacksonville.

South Florida has an Albanian community, although it is rather very small in Miami and Miami Beach, with the 2020s estimated data showing that not even a total of 100 ethnic Albanians live in those two cities combined. 30 miles from Miami is Oakland Park, which has 800 Albanians, two percent of the city's population, and 350 live in Pompano Beach. Orlando and nearby communities do not have many Albanians, although Sanford, 20 miles away, has 300 Albanian residents.

Within the Dallas-Fort Worth metropolitan area, Plano has a large community in addition to the metropolitan area's two aforementioned cities. The zip code of 75075, west of the Central Expressway in Plano, is 1.5% Albanian; 500-600 residents. There is a Balkan/Albanian restaurant, cultural center in Lewisville, and one to two thousand Albanians reside in the Dallas area.

There is an Albanian presence in the Nashville area. While much smaller in other parts of Tennessee, such as Memphis and Knoxville where both cities have less than 50 Albanians live in said cities proper, over 1,000 Albanians live in Nashville. There is an Albanian-language Christian monastery that is adjoined with a community center there.

Also, there is a small, yet thriving and historically important Albanian community in Louisiana, particularly around New Orleans. Most of them are Arbëresh (Albanians from Italy).

=== Western U.S. ===
In addition to New York, Connecticut, Florida and Michigan having most of the Albanian population, pockets of sizable Albanians are found in San Diego County, which has roughly up towards 1,000 Albanians, many residing in Santee, or in the East San Diego County area. There are also several hundred Albanian Americans in the Sacramento Valley, especially in and around Carmichael. Pasadena, in Los Angeles, also has several hundred Albanians. Scottsdale, Arizona, as well as the Greater Phoenix area, has about 2-3,000 ethnic Albanians, and an Albanian cafe in Phoenix. A small yet sizable Albanian community can be found in Washington state, including Mercer Island and within the Seattle area.

=== Age demographics ===
Albanian-Americans are on average younger than non-Albanian Americans, having an average age of 33.5 in comparison to the American national average of 37.7. Albanian-Americans also have a higher percentage of males than non-Albanian Americans with 52.1% of the community being male versus the American national average of 49.2%.

=== Albanian-born population ===
Albanian-born population in the U.S. since 2010 (excludes Albanians born in Kosovo, North Macedonia, Montenegro):

Year	Number
2010	77,407
2011	▲86,010
2012	▼83,746
2013	▼81,047
2014	▲81,622
2015	▲89,744
2016	▲93,033

== Schools and language preservation ==
New York City Public Schools started teaching Albanian language in the late 2010s; the language was offered to PS 105 in Morris Park, Bronx. Starting in 2024, Albanian language is taught at an Albanian and Montenegrin American cultural center to roughly 60 children in Ridgewood, Queens, NYC, entitled the "Fol Shqip School," and Mercy College is the only college known to be teaching Albanian courses in New York City.

== Culture ==
Common ingredients found in typical Albanian American homes consist of cabbage, onions, root vegetables, peppers, and olives. Feta cheese is widely favored by Albanian Americans, while other protein sources encompass beef, lamb, chicken, and fish. Traditional Albanian cuisine features salads, stuffed dishes, savory pies, soups, and an assortment of sweets. The Albanian culture is renowned for its hospitality, particularly in the form of food, which is evident in the extensive selection of cold and hot mezze, or appetizers. These are generally served alongside rakia.

== Notable people ==
Selected people:

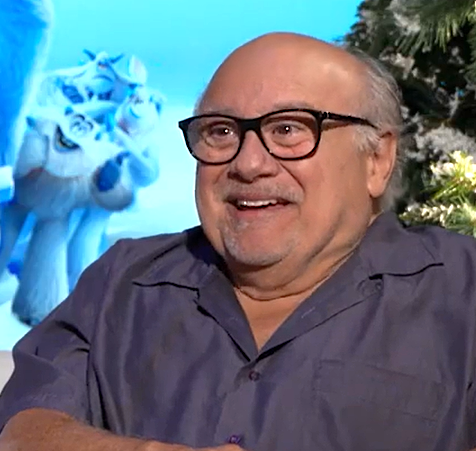
Danny DeVito

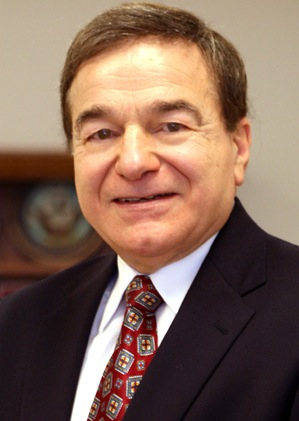
Joe DioGuardi

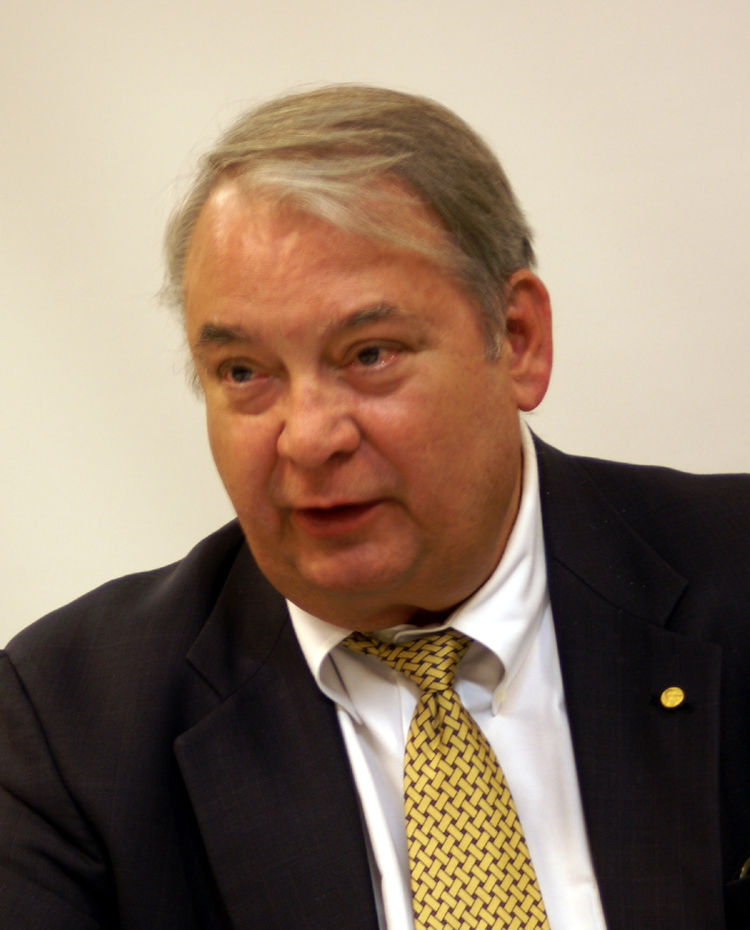
Ferid Murad

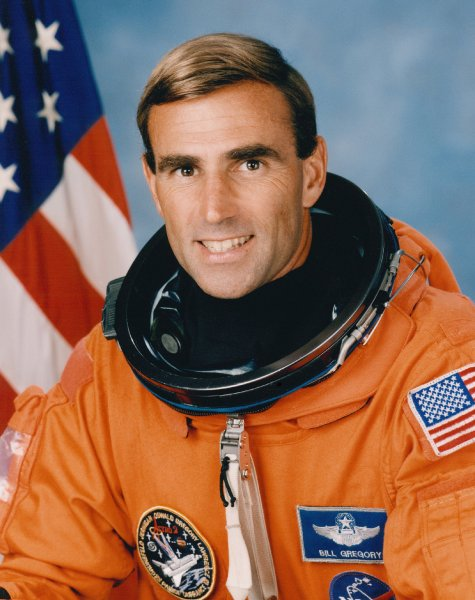
William G. Gregory

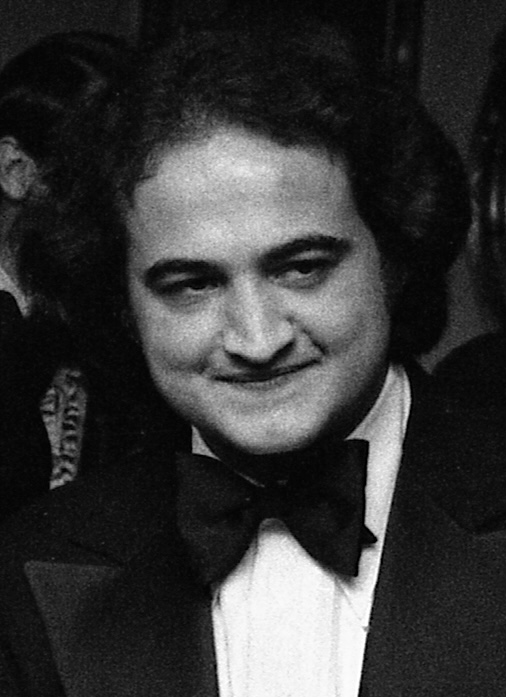
John Belushi

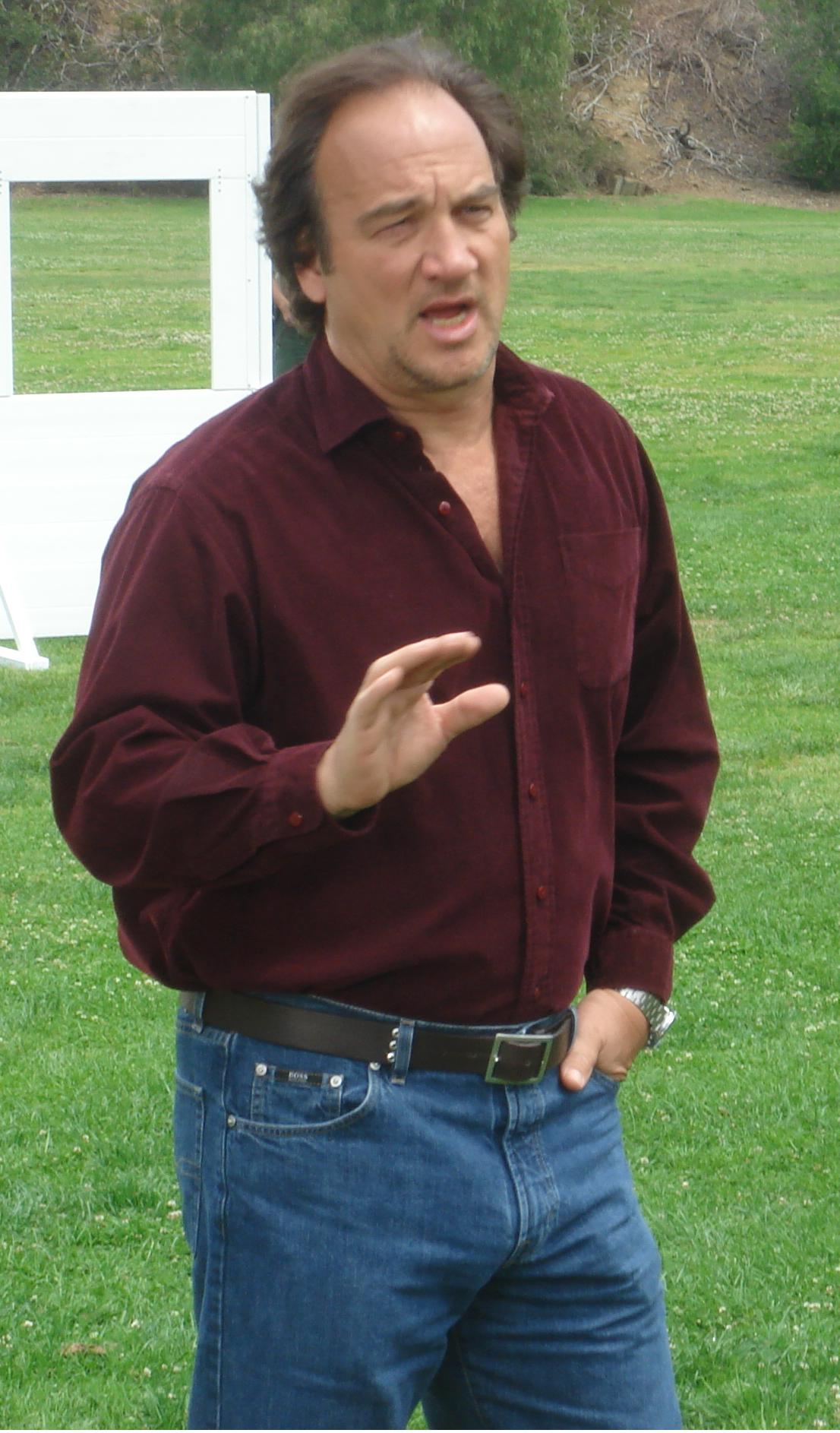
Jim Belushi

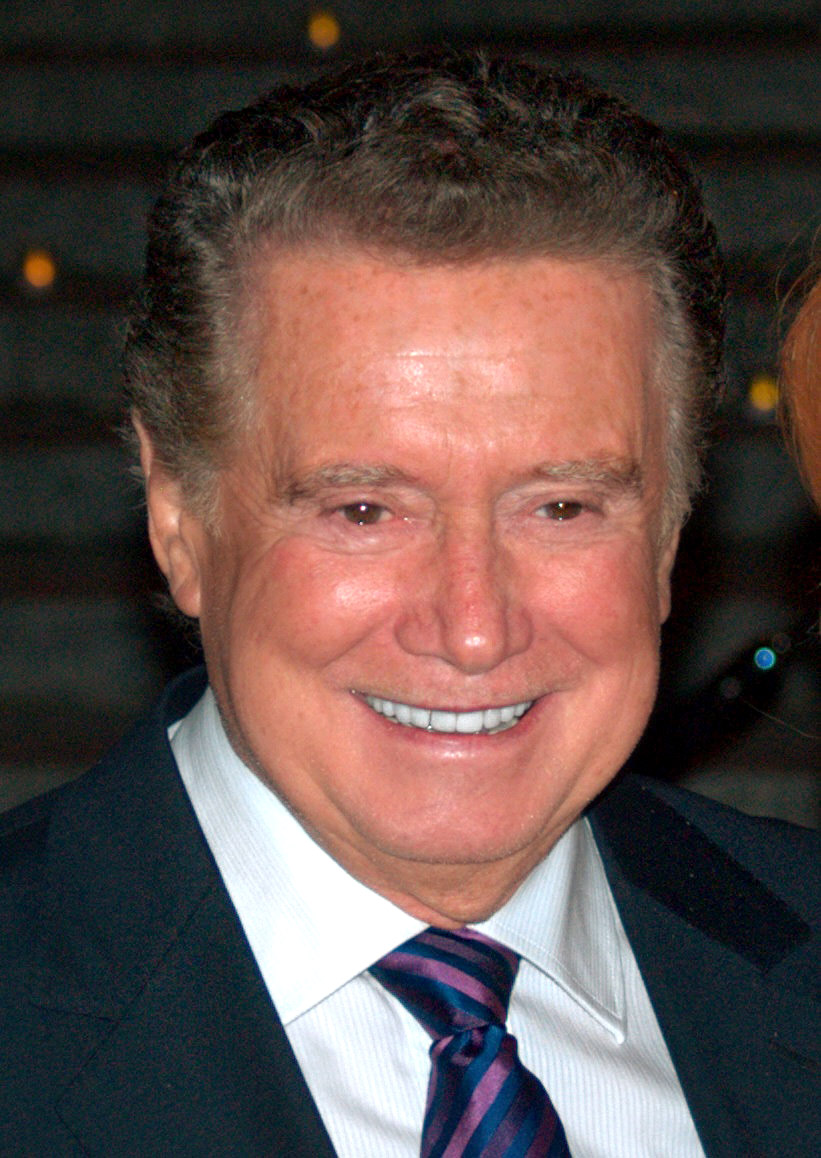
Regis Philbin

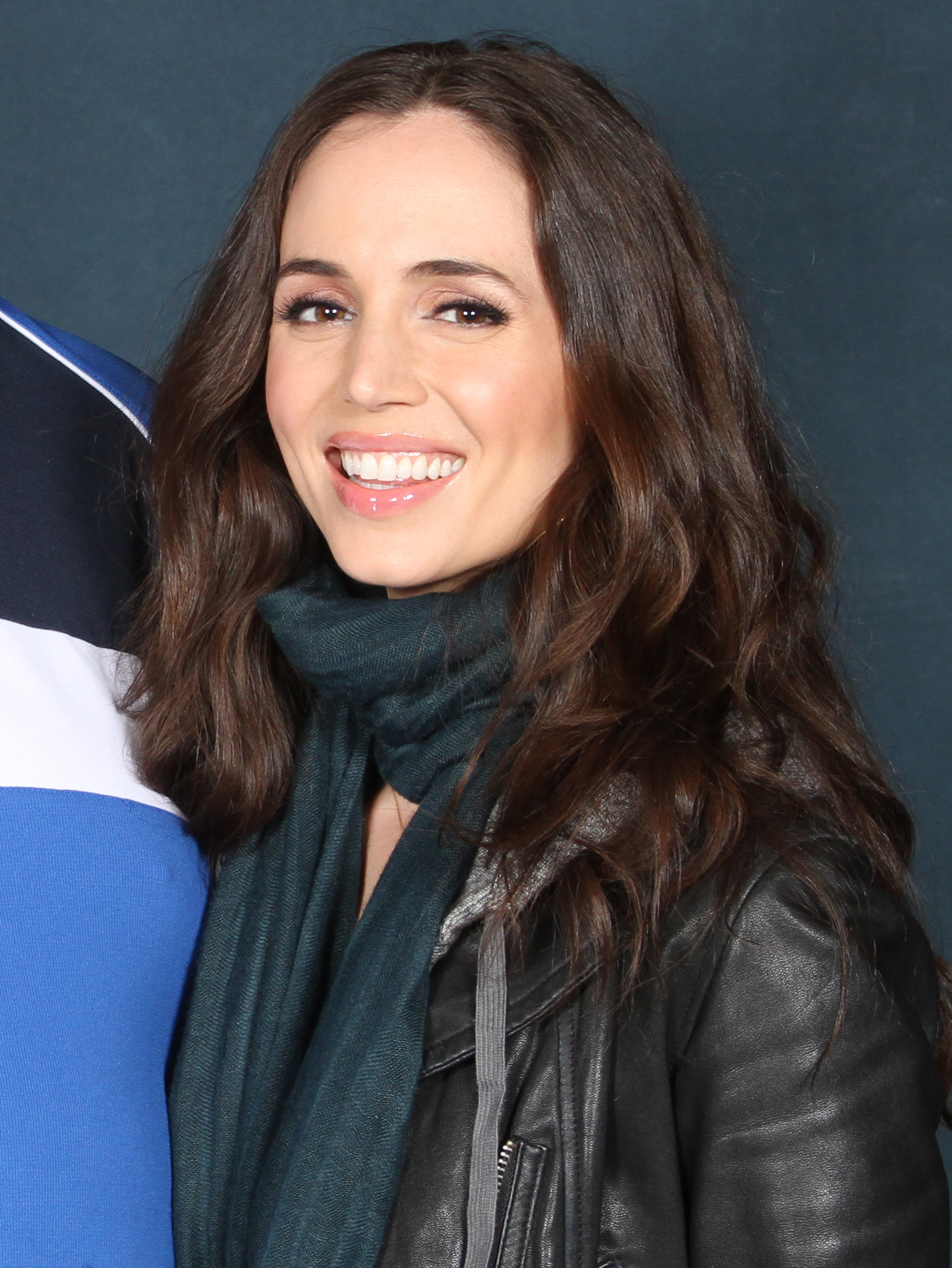
Eliza Dushku

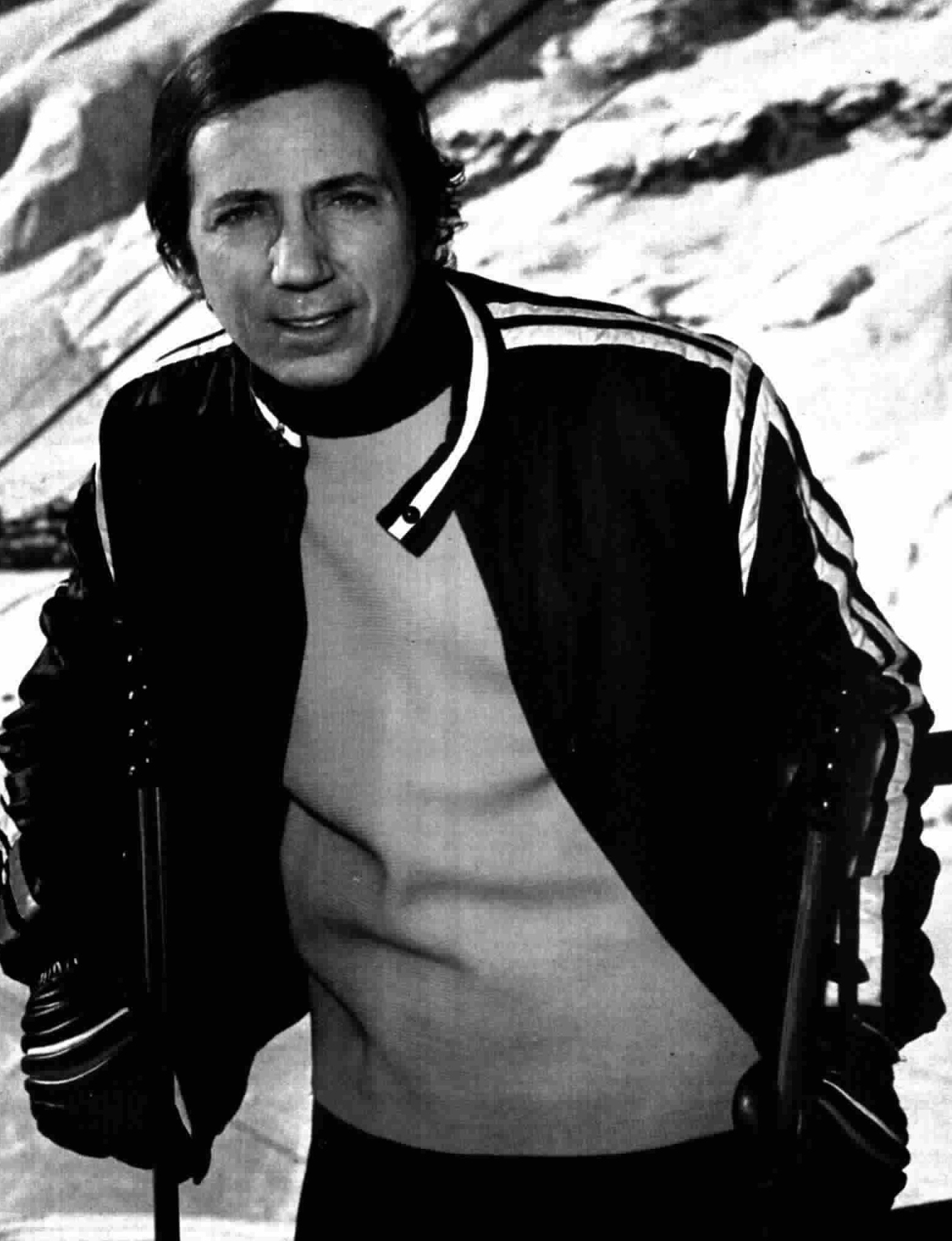
Mike Bongiorno

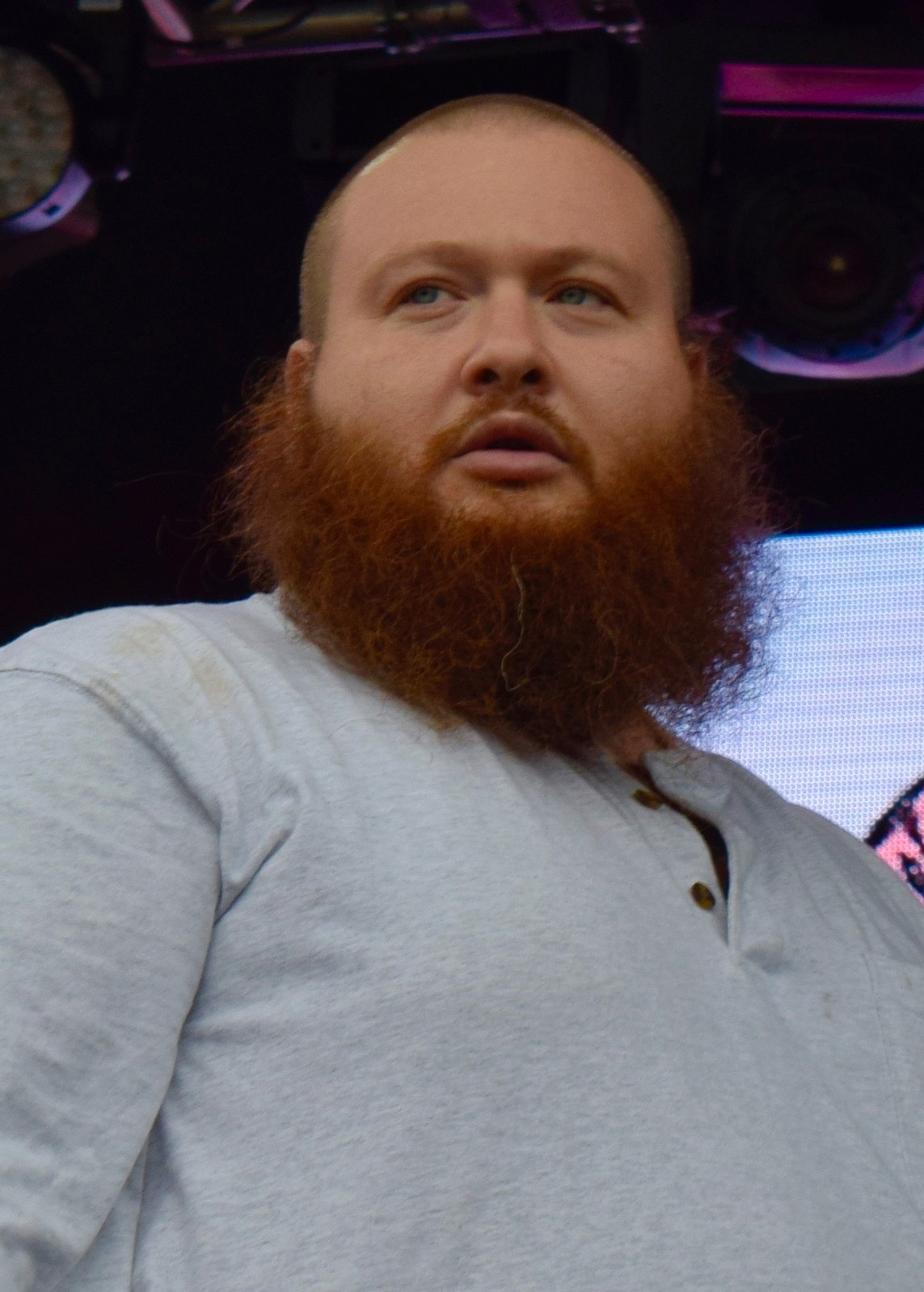
Action Bronson

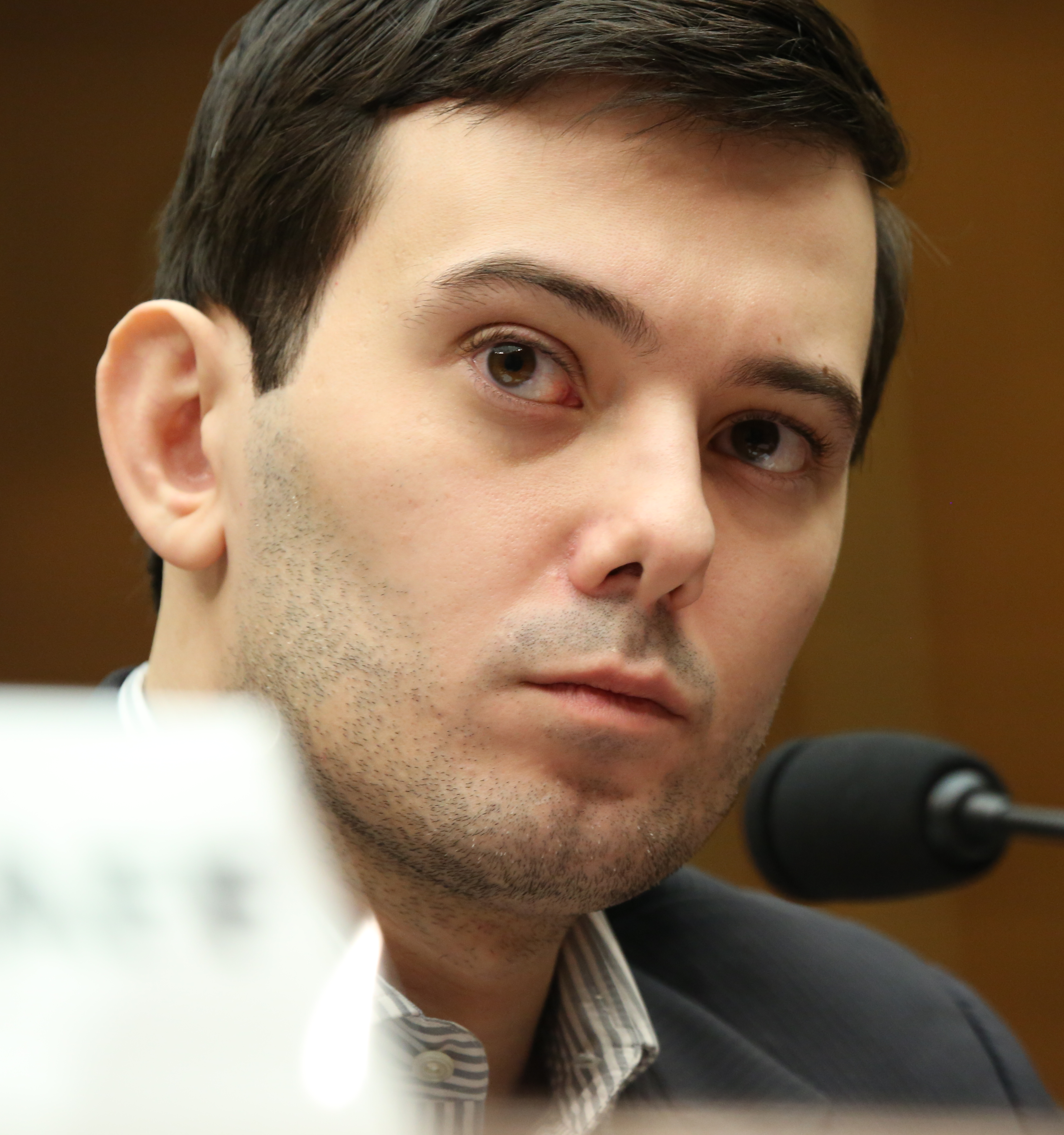
Martin Shkreli

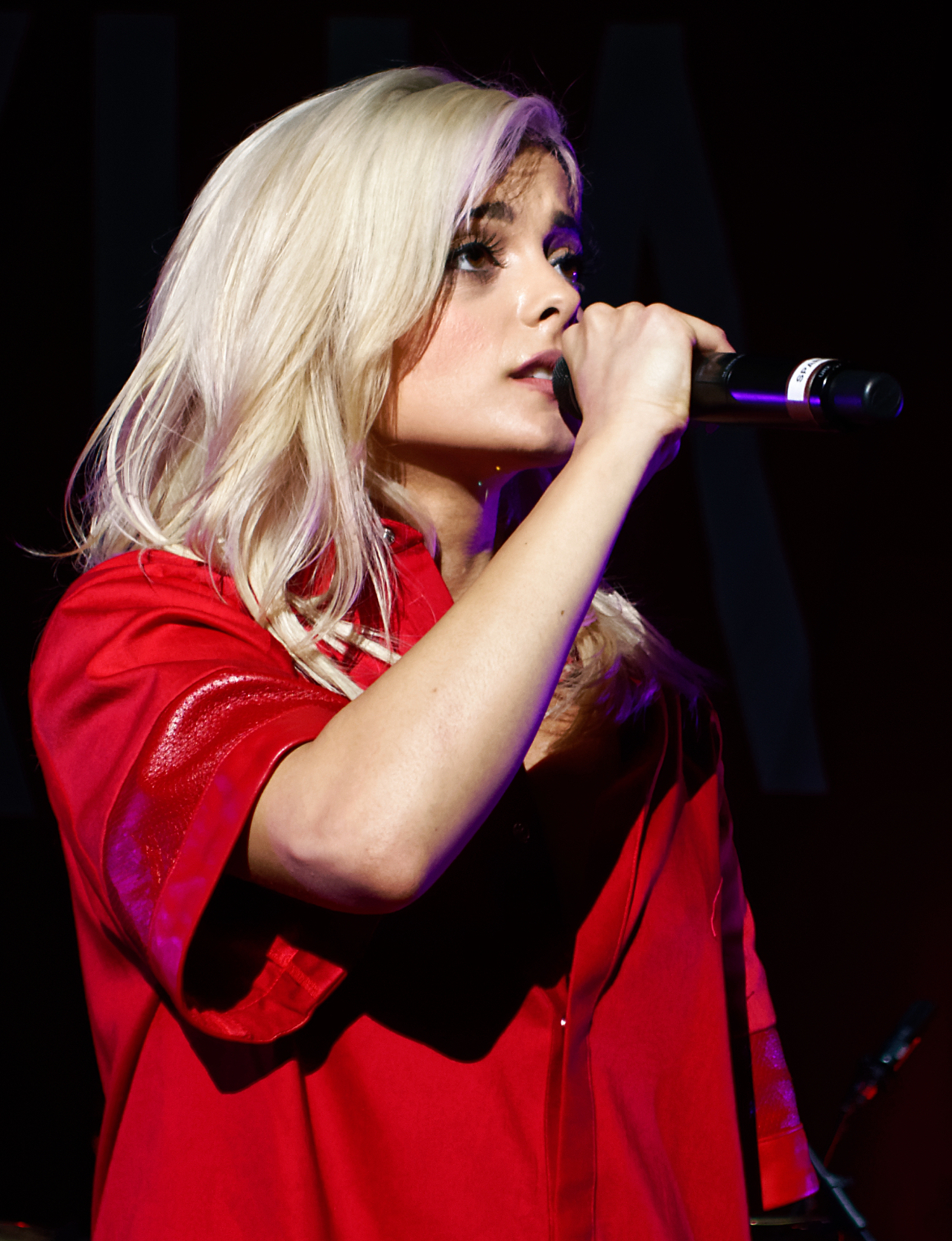
Bebe Rexha

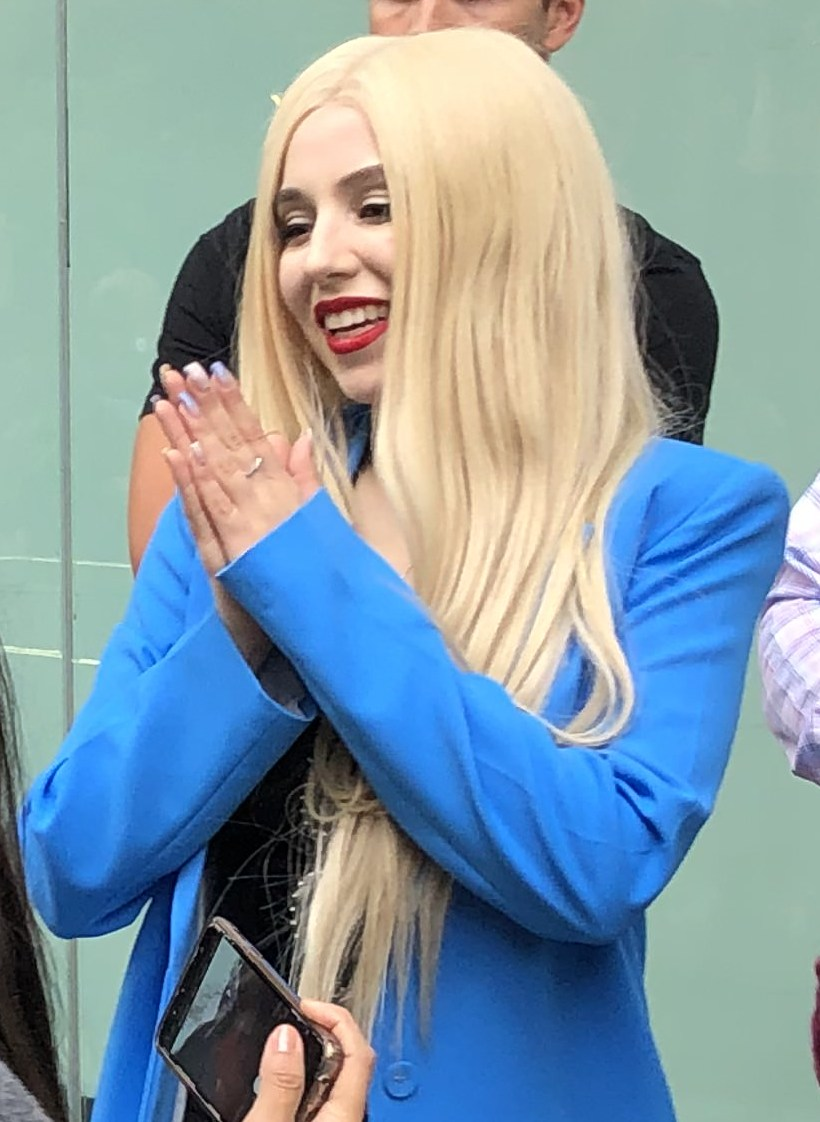
Ava Max

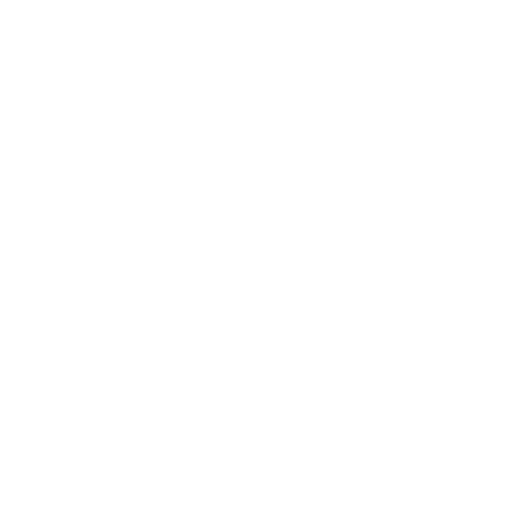
Mira Murati

== See also ==
- Albania-United States relations
- Albanian American Student Organization
- Albanian diaspora
- Albanians in New York City
- European Americans
- History of the Albanian Americans in Metro Detroit
- History of Albanians in Maine

== Websites ==
- Nedelkoska, Ljubica (February 2015). "The Albanian Community in the United States - Statistical Profiling of the Albanian-Americans" (PDF). Center for International Development at Harvard University.
- Ragaru, Nadege; Dymi, Amilda (March 2010). "The Albanian-American Community in the United States" (PDF). HAL archives.
