= Albanian Roots =

Albanian non-profit social organization

Albanian Roots – Rrënjët Shqiptare
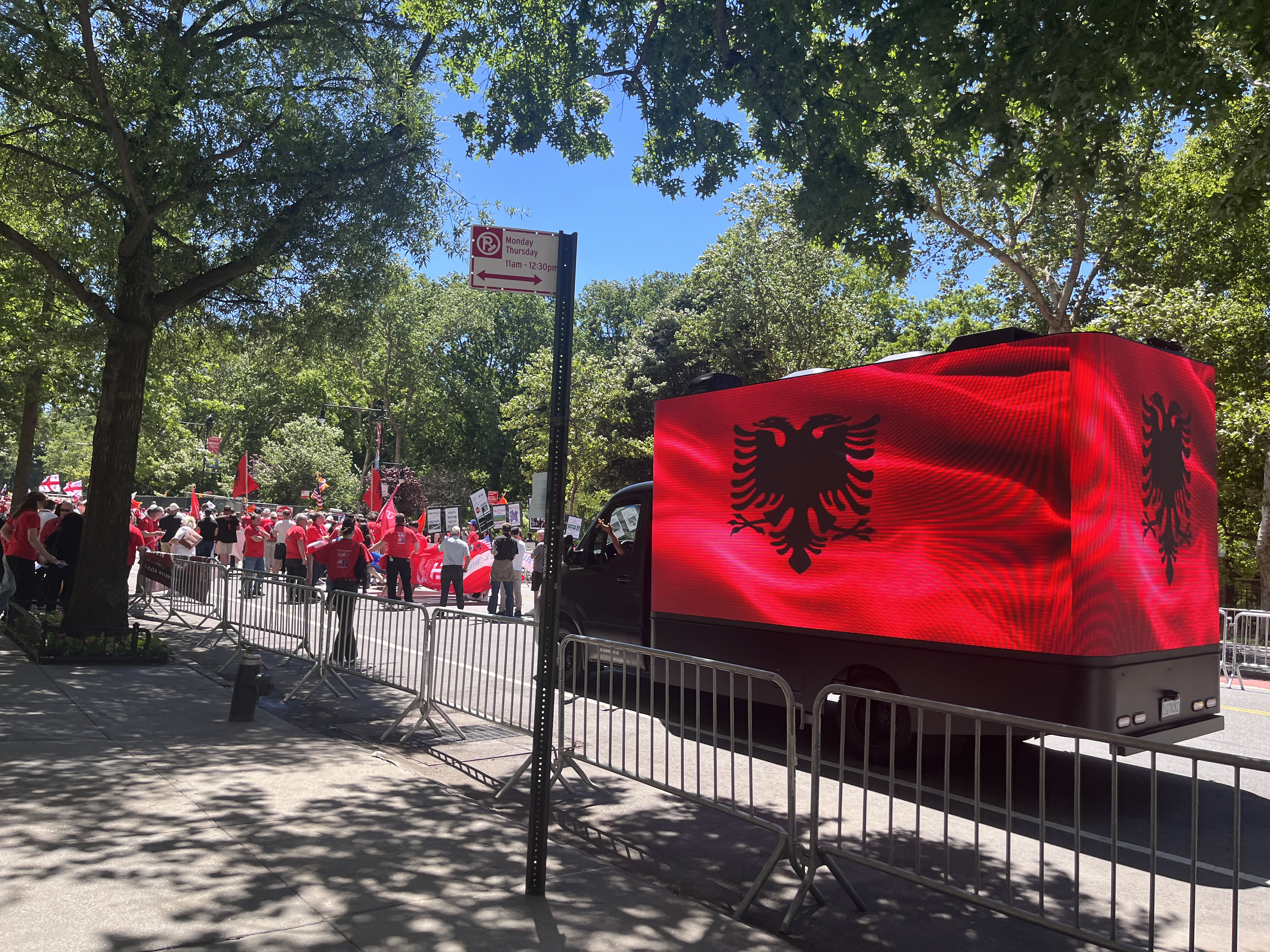
- The annual Albanian Roots Parade in Manhattan
- Abbreviation: AR-RS
- Type: 501(c)(3) non-profit corporation
- Legal status: Non-Government Organization
- Purpose: Protect Albanian diaspora interests via cultural activities, activist movements.
- Headquarters: New York City, New York, United States
- Members: 1000–2500
- Official language: Albanian, English
- President: Marko Kepi
- Affiliations: Albanian American Civic League Vatra, Albanian American Student Organization, Ana e Malit, Fondacioni Plave-Guci, ISA.
- Volunteers: 100–200
- Website: albanianroots.org

Albanian Roots (Albanian: Rrënjët Shqiptare) is a New York City-based non-religious, non-profit organization of young Albanian professionals whose mission is to strengthen the Albanian community by integrating Albanians with each other and their adopted countries throughout the whole Albanian diaspora. Albanian Roots works primarily to build a strong relationship with other Albanian communities in order to share a more dynamic and cohesive partnership.

Its main event is the Albanian Roots Parade in the Immigrants Day Parade in New York City.

== Goals ==
The stated goals of Albanian Roots are to:

- Foster educational Albanian History and language in Albanian Schools.
- Promote for non-religious Albanian Community center in New York City.
- Promote the Albanian Block, "Blloku Shqiptare", in the Bronx on Arthur Ave.
- Promote the development of an Albanian American Chambers of Commerce.
- Further the growing interest of Albanian immigrants worldwide in the Diaspora.
- Facilitate closer cooperation among Albanian communities.
- Educate and uphold the general principles of Albanian Culture & Heritage.
- Promote Prominent Albanian Talent.
- Albanian Roots Parade.

== History ==
Albanian Roots was created as a result of national pride among young Albanian college students in New York City. The concept of gathering the Albanian student organizations was initialized as early as 2008. In 2009, Albanian Roots was a DBA of Albanian American Civic League and under the guidance of Joe DioGuardi. In 2011, the official organization paperwork was filed and Albanian Roots was an independent NGO with official 501c3 status.

In 2008, Albanian students wanted to replicate how the Italians, Irish, Puerto Ricans had their own day where they could express their pride and heritage. Consequently, the students decided to do the same thing and eventually built the foundations for the Albanian Roots Organization. In 2009, Marko Kepi, Ervin Toro and other Albanian students wanted to participate in the International day parade where they could represent Albania, they called it the Albanian Roots Parade Because Albania begins with the letter "A", they led the parade and where in front of most other floats and thus they received much acclaimed attention from the public and the media. Due to marketing on Facebook, thousands of Albanian Americans showed up in huge numbers. The students were shocked. Afterwards they realized that this was the start to something big. They eventually began the idea of constructing an Albanian Roots organization. The students wanted a more professional representation of Albanians in order to keep young Albanians engaged in their community and contribute to the greater cause. They further built the organization to have support from well-known and respected entertainers, athletes, politicians, humanitarians, and the general public.

On 26 November 2019, an earthquake struck the Durrës region of Albania. Albanian Roots raised 1.3 million dollars for earthquake victims.

== Events ==
Albanian Roots hosts international dignitaries, delegates, in the greater good for the Albanian community. Albanian Roots annually participates in the Gift of Life events where they support and help to raise money for Albanian children to get the surgery necessary to save the children's lives. Albanian Roots also participates as frequent as possible with the Holocaust Remembrance Day. The Albanian community has very close ties with the Jewish communities and often partake in their Holocaust Remembrance Days, often giving speech on Albanians who saved the Jews during World War II. Albanian Roots, also, every single year hosts parties to celebrate the Albanian Independence Day, Flag Day, and Kosovo Independence Day.

=== AIDA Meeting- Promoting Albanian Trade ===
On July 8, 2013, Albanian Roots hosted a meeting with the Albanian International Development Agency with the Albanian American Chambers of Commerce in promoting trade with Albanian companies in Albania to sell their products in the United States.

=== Rally to support Albanian Orthodoxy – Archbishop Janullatos Campaign ===
On January 28, 2014, Albanian Roots held a campaign protesting a controversial award given to Greek born Archbishop Janullatos. There has been speculation that the orthodoxy in Albania is reverting to a Greek-style structure and architecture. Many believe that the Archbishop is influenced politically by the Greek state and is guided by the Greek church. Many of the Albanian Orthodox want to revert to the traditional ways of archbishop Fan Noli.

=== Rally to Support the Albanians of Montenegro- Protest against Djukanovic at the United Nations ===
On April 8, 2014, Albanians Roots participated and supported other Albanian Organizations in protesting the prime minister of Montenegro for not respecting civil rights for Albanians in Montenegro. Albanian do not enjoy the same civil rights as others and are not officially recognized. The Albanian Organizations openly reprimanded the act of using religion, geography, and politics to assimilate people in order to control the Albanian minority.

=== President Bujar Nishani- 5 year Anniversary Gala ===
On September 26–27, 2014, Albanian Roots hosted a dinner celebrating their 5-year anniversary where they hosted the Albanian President, Bujar Nishani, and exchanged awards. President Nisahni commented the young professional Albanians in the wonderful work they have been doing in integrating the Albanians Community through events and service.

=== Albanian Film Festival ===
In September 2014, Albanian Roots partnered up with Albanian Film Festival group in order to promote the Albanian Film Festival that is held annually every November.

=== Support "Albanian Equality Movement" ===
On October 15, 2014, Albanian Roots reacted towards the senseless violence and discrimination that occurred during the Serbia v Albania soccer match by organizing a campaign named "Albanian Equality Movement". The movement composed of various methods in raising awareness and seeking actions towards the racism, prejudice, and discrimination the Albania national football team experienced on October 14, 2014. The movement's purpose was to achieve a long-term interest in the need to achieve peace and equilibrium in the Balkans by offering equal civil rights to Albanian minorities in neighboring Balkan countries. The campaign aimed at engaging the worldwide public in requesting international institutions to get involved and request for government officials in the Balkans to respect international Human Rights codes. The movement encompasses:

- Creating awareness via social media and internet newspapers.
- Official petition in the white house to promote equal rights for Albanians in the Balkans.
- Phone banks to contact government officials to create a mandate and eventually open a committee to denounce the racist acts and eventually politically intervene.
- Platform on how to contact international institutions and writing letters to them on the issue.
- Writing letters to FIFA and UEFA.
- Seeking support of Amnesty International and other human rights organizations.
- Boycotting Serbian products and the official sponsors of the Serbian national soccer team; Umbro.
- Interviews with media sources in the United States as well as in Albania.

The movement was spread to various Albanian organizations all across the world and received official declaration of support from Albanian organizations in Italy, Switzerland, Croatia, Slovenia, Presheva, Sanxhak, Greece, Turkey, Lebanon, Argentina, Canada, and of course numerous Albanian Organizations in the United States.

== Executive Leadership ==
Position	Name	Contact
President/Co-founder	Marko Kepi	
Vice President	Bujar Gjata	
Treasurer	Kristjan Mundija	
Secretary	Enkolana Cekaj Mundija	

== Chapters ==
Year	Satellite	Associate
2009	New York	Marko Kepi
2012	Michigan	N/A
2013	Texas	Beso Buranaj Hoxha
2014	TBD	TBD

== See also ==
- Albanian American Civic League
- List of Albanian Americans
- Vatra, the Pan-Albanian Federation of America
