= 2010 United States Senate special election in New York =

- November 2, 2010
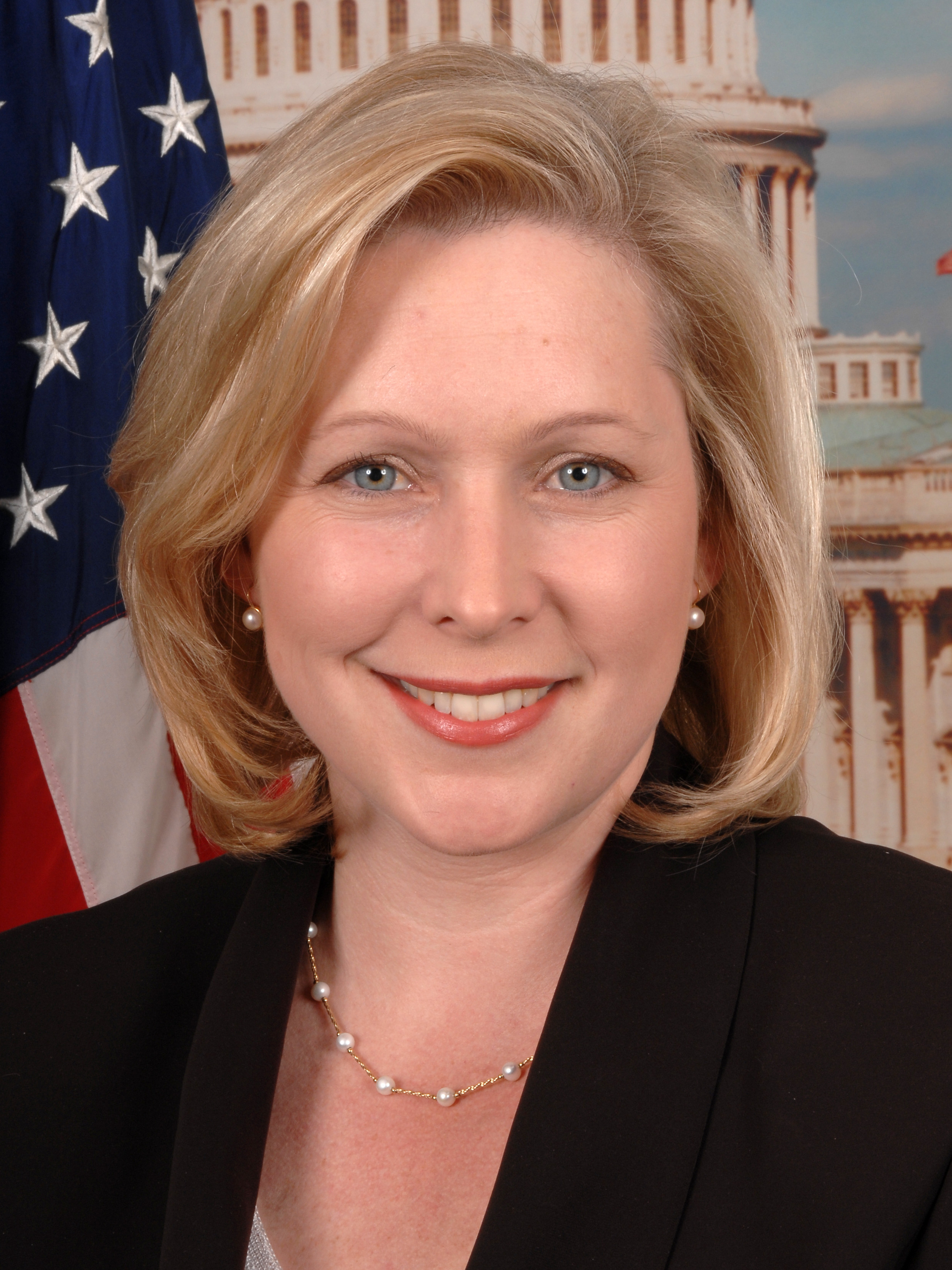

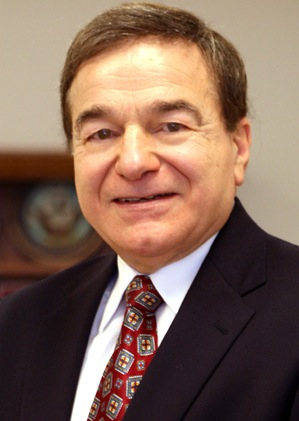
Nominee	Kirsten Gillibrand	Joe DioGuardi
Party	Democratic	Republican
Alliance	Parties: Independence; Working Families	Conservative
Popular vote	2,836,361	1,581,834
Percentage	62.94%	35.10%
- County results Gillibrand: 40–50% 50–60% 60–70% 70–80% 80–90% DioGuardi: 50–60%
U.S. senator before election
Kirsten Gillibrand (Note: In January 2009, Gillibrand was appointed by Governor David Paterson to fill the vacancy caused by the resignation of Senator Hillary Clinton, who had been appointed U.S. Secretary of State.)
Democratic
Elected U.S. Senator
Kirsten Gillibrand
Democratic

The 2010 United States Senate special election in New York took place on November 2, 2010, concurrently with other elections to the United States Senate in other states as well as elections to the United States House of Representatives and various state and local elections. Governor David Paterson had appointed Kirsten Gillibrand to serve as United States Senator from New York until the 2010 special election, replacing former senator Hillary Clinton, who resigned to serve as Secretary of State in the Barack Obama administration. The winner of the special election was to complete the term ending in January 2013. The special election took place concurrently with the regular election for the Senate seat held by Chuck Schumer and the 2010 New York gubernatorial election.

Due to this special election, 2010 marked the first time since the ratification of the 17th Amendment in 1913 that all of New York's six statewide offices were up for popular election on the same day. These elections coincided with the elections of all United States representatives from New York, all members of the New York State legislature, and many other officeholders.

== Appointment history ==
During the appointment process, a large number of candidates were mentioned, including:

- Buffalo Mayor Byron Brown
- Former President Bill Clinton
- New York State Attorney General and eventual Governor of New York Andrew Cuomo
- New York State Assemblywoman RoAnn Destito
- Actress and eventual SAG-AFTRA president Fran Drescher
- Then-U.S. Representative and eventual seat-appointee Kirsten Gillibrand
- U.S. Representative Brian Higgins
- U.S. Representative Steve Israel
- Attorney, author, and eventual U.S. Ambassador to Japan Caroline Kennedy
- U.S. Representative Nita Lowey
- Former Lieutenant Governor Stan Lundine
- U.S. Representative Carolyn Maloney
- U.S. Representative Greg Meeks
- U.S. Representative Jerrold Nadler
- New York state assemblyman Daniel J. O'Donnell
- Nassau County Executive Thomas Suozzi
- U.S. Representative Nydia Velázquez
- United Federation of Teachers President Randi Weingarten

=== Speculation ===
An early favorite for selection was New York Congresswoman Nita Lowey, who in the late 1990s had been planning a run for the 2000 Senate election, but had stepped aside once then-First Lady of the United States Clinton had decided to run for the office. But Lowey soon withdrew from consideration, having gained enough seniority to become one of the powerful "cardinals" on the House Appropriations Committee and did not want to relinquish that position. Another who withdrew from consideration was New York Congresswoman Nydia Velázquez.

Senator Schumer did not publicly indicate a preference, but reportedly favored Congresswoman Gillibrand. The indication by Caroline Kennedy that she was possibly interested in being appointed drew the most media attention. Her family legacy (including that her uncle Robert F. Kennedy had previously held the seat) and star power was balanced against her inexperience in politics and elections. Her uncle Senator Ted Kennedy, in a battle with brain cancer, encouraged her to seek the position. On December 15, Kennedy indicated that she was definitely seeking the appointment, making phone calls to Paterson and other prominent Democrats. Kennedy and her uncle had backed Obama over Clinton at a crucial time in the long presidential nomination struggle, and some past Clinton supporters initially disparaged Kennedy's qualifications for the senate seat. But soon Clinton told her supporters not to stand in the way of a Kennedy selection; Clinton said she herself would have no public comments on any of the possible choices.

Public opinion polls showed that Kennedy and Cuomo were the two most popular choices of New York residents, with their large name recognition factors playing a role. Paterson faced a complex set of factors in making the choice. Women's groups were pressuring him to replace Clinton with another woman, while upstate groups were dissatisfied at their lack of representation in top-level statewide offices. Paterson's own gubernatorial election campaign could benefit from a Democratic star such as Kennedy in the senate race, which would help him raise money and increase voter enthusiasm, while the choice of Kennedy would also bolster his relations with the Obama administration. Whatever candidate is chosen would be faced with likely having to raise $35 million for the 2010 special election and then, if victorious, another $35 million for the 2012 regular election two years later.

By later in December, Kennedy had mounted a concerted effort to gain support around the state, and had made several trips and appearances as well. Kennedy's appointment was supported by Congresswoman Louise Slaughter, State Assemblyman Vito Lopez, New York City mayor Michael Bloomberg, former New York City Mayor Ed Koch and the New York Post editorial page. She received criticism for not voting in a number of Democratic primaries and general elections since registering in 1988 in New York City and also for not providing details about her political views.

Kennedy declined to make disclosures of her financial dealings or other personal matters, stating that she would not release the information publicly unless she was selected by Paterson, at which time she would be subject to the same background checks as all appointees. Kennedy acknowledged that she was going to have to prove herself: "Going into politics is something people have asked me about forever. When this opportunity came along, which was sort of unexpected, I thought, `Well, maybe now. How about now?' [I'll have to] work twice as hard as anybody else ... I am an unconventional choice ... We're starting to see there are many ways into public life and public service."

The apparent effort by Kennedy forces to make her appear the "inevitable" choice drew reports of resistance among Democratic officials, including Paterson himself. Kennedy said she will not run for the seat in 2010 if she is not appointed by Paterson. In late December 2008, Kennedy drew criticism from several media outlets for lacking clarity in interviews, and for using the phrase "you know" 168 times during a 30-minute interview with NY1. At one point, there was speculation among Democratic Party officials that Paterson would make a caretaker appointment, meaning someone who would pledge to only serve the two years and not run in 2010. This would allow Paterson to avoid choosing among competing choices and give them a level playing field two years hence. Speculation even focused on former President Bill Clinton as the caretaker, but on New Year's Day Paterson seemed to indicate he was not inclined towards the idea: "In the United States Senate, the most effective senators are the ones that have seniority."

By early January 2009, Kennedy's support had dropped in public opinion polls, with 44 percent of New Yorkers saying they had a lesser impression of her since she began her campaign for the appointment, versus 23 percent having a better impression. A mid-January Quinnipiac University Polling Institute poll showed Cuomo 7 percentage points ahead of Kennedy in voter preference, and more voters than not thinking Kennedy was unqualified for the position. Paterson made all interested candidates submit lengthy vetting documents as part of their candidacy. An official of the League of Women Voters criticized Paterson for not making the vetting questions public. Paterson said he would announce his decision shortly after the Obama inauguration.

On January 22, 2009, after several conflicting reports, Kennedy released a statement withdrawing from consideration for the seat, citing personal reasons. The following day, further conflicting reports ensued over what the specific reason was for Kennedy's withdrawal, and whether or not Paterson would have picked her had she stayed in. Some of the reports were based on Paterson's office planting false stories with the press that Kennedy had serious problems with the hiring of a nanny or unpaid taxes.

=== Appointment ===
On the same day that Kennedy dropped out, WPIX-TV and the Albany Times Union reported that Governor Paterson was expected to announce he was appointing Kirsten Gillibrand. The Governor made the official announcement of Gillibrand's appointment at a press conference in Albany on January 23, 2009.

By a month later, Paterson had conceded that his office had been responsible for leaks at the end of the appointment process, intended to contest the Kennedy camp's claim that she had been his first choice for the position. Paterson said, however, that he had not expected the level of attacks that ensued from his office at the time: "The things said about Caroline I found despicable and shocking and very painful. I never would have imagined removing the idea that this is my first choice meant a character assassination."

== Democratic primary ==
The Democratic primary election was held on September 14, 2010.

Paterson's appointment of Gillibrand alienated Caroline Kennedy and Andrew Cuomo supporters as well as some key liberal Democratic ideological constituencies, and made it possible that the centrist Gillibrand would face a primary challenge in 2010. She did not have the full backing of the New York congressional delegation either, and one state Democratic operative said, "I think she's going to get a serious primary in 2010."

Carolyn McCarthy, formerly a colleague of Gillibrand's in the New York delegation to the United States House of Representatives, said that if Gillibrand was appointed, she would mount a primary campaign against her in 2010 if no other candidate who favored stricter gun control laws did so. McCarthy is known as a staunch advocate of gun control laws, after her husband was murdered in a 1993 commuter train shooting spree, while Gillibrand was endorsed by the National Rifle Association of America. Gillibrand also served as a lawyer for Philip Morris, Inc.

Despite the potential for a primary challenge, Democratic Senatorial Campaign Committee chairman Bob Menendez, Senator from New Jersey, suggested that by the election, Gillibrand "will have convinced her fellow Democrats that she deserves their support." However, a February 2009 Quinnipiac University Polling Institute poll showed Gillibrand losing a hypothetical primary matchup to McCarthy, and Gillibrand was said to be worried that Governor Paterson's declining popularity would pull her down too. Congresswoman Carolyn Maloney and Manhattan Borough President Scott Stringer were also seriously considering a primary challenge to Gillibrand, as was Long Island Congressman Steve Israel. In April 2009, Stringer formed an exploratory committee towards that end. Despite the possible challenges, by April 2009 Gillibrand had raised $2.3 million in campaign funds since joining the Senate.

In May 2009, Obama persuaded Israel to forsake a run, in the interests of not having a messy primary. Obama's intervention was largely at the request of Gillibrand patron Charles Schumer. However, Congresswoman Maloney indicated that she was still considering a primary challenge and that Israel's decision would not influence hers. Several days later, Stringer said he would not run either, for the same reasons as Israel. In the wake of their withdrawals, Congressman José Serrano considered running for a while.

In early June 2009, Congresswoman McCarthy took herself out of any run. McCarthy, who had raised only a small fraction of the amount of money Gillibrand had, said her declining was for personal reasons. Maloney, however, still seemed likely to run, and a conversation with Vice President Joe Biden did not change her mind. Several House Democrats from New York said that the White House's interventions to forestall a primary race had been unwise.

As July 2009 began, a senior advisor to Maloney indicated that the congresswoman definitely was in, saying "She's decided to run because she believes there needs to be a debate on the real issues and she wants to give New Yorkers a choice." However, after facing difficulties in hiring staff, and losing some longtime supporters and organizational support in preparation for a bid, Maloney backed out in August 2009.

In September 2009, a New York Post report that former Governor Eliot Spitzer was considering a Senate run were labeled "totally untrue" and "ridiculous" by Spitzer and his allies.

During 2009, Suffolk County legislature Majority Leader Jon Cooper seriously considered running against Gillibrand, but at the end of the year he opted out of running and endorsed Gillibrand instead.

Labor activist and 2006 Senate challenger Jonathan Tasini announced his candidacy as a Democratic opponent to Gillibrand in late 2009. Thereafter, however, he withdrew from the race, choosing instead to mount a primary challenge to Congressman Charles Rangel. In January 2010, The New York Times reported that former congressman Harold Ford Jr. of Tennessee was considering a primary challenge against Senator Kirsten Gillibrand. Ford moved to New York City after his unsuccessful senate run in Tennessee and was working as a vice president of Merrill Lynch. He was reportedly backed by several high-profile Democrats, prominent Democratic donors and Wall Street executives who were dissatisfied with Senator Gillibrand. The New York Times originally reported that New York City Mayor Michael Bloomberg might support Ford in a primary challenge. They later reported however, that Senate Majority Leader Harry Reid called Mayor Bloomberg to discuss the possibility of Bloomberg backing Ford but they reported that he assured the Majority Leader "that he was not personally involved in the effort to promote a Ford candidacy." Senator Schumer reportedly met with Ford to try and dissuade him from challenging Gillibrand but said the meeting had been planned months in advance. Ford had already drawn fire from liberal advocacy groups and Gillibrand supporters who criticized Ford as being too conservative for the state, citing his anti-abortion stance, support for gun rights, and his previous opposition to same-sex marriage and pro-business stance. Ford sought to portray himself as an independent voice for New Yorkers saying that he wouldn't be "intimidated or bullied" by "Albany and Washington." Gillibrand's allies sought to portray Ford as opportunistic and out-of-step with New York Democratic voters, citing his conservative record as a Representative of a southern state in Congress. Gillibrand's camp denied intimidation efforts against Ford, saying that Gillibrands supporters "aren't bullying, they're informing New Yorkers." .

The tussle was enough to bring renewed attempts to lure Congressman Steve Israel into reconsidering a race to represent liberal interests, but his spokesperson said, "The congressman appreciates the encouragement he's received to reconsider his decision regarding the U.S. Senate race in New York. That said, it's hard to imagine a scenario in which he'd re-enter the race." On March 1, Ford indicated that he would not in fact run. On July 14, 2010, New York City attorney Gail Goode delivered 45,000 petitions to the state Board of Elections in order to qualify for a slot on the Democratic line in the September 14 primary against Gillibrand.

=== Candidates ===
- Kirsten Gillibrand, incumbent U.S. Senator
- Gail Goode, attorney

Disqualified

- Joseph Huff, running on the Rent Is Too Damn High Party line

Withdrew

- Scott Noren, oral surgeon
- Jonathan Tasini, labor activist and candidate for U.S. Senate in 2006 (ran for U.S. House)

Declined

- Andrew Cuomo, Attorney General of New York (ran for governor)
- Harold Ford, Jr., former U.S. Representative from Tennessee's 9th congressional district (1997—2007) and chair of the Democratic Leadership Council
- Steve Israel, U.S. Representative for New York's 2nd congressional district since 2001
- Caroline Kennedy, author and daughter of John F. Kennedy
- Carolyn Maloney, U.S. Representative for New York's 14th congressional district since 1993
- Eliot Spitzer, former governor of New York
- Tom Suozzi, former Nassau County Executive and mayor of Glen Cove
- Bill Thompson, former New York City Comptroller

=== Hypothetical Polling ===
Poll Source	Dates Administered	Caroline Kennedy	Andrew Cuomo	Steve Israel	Thomas Suozzi	Carolyn Maloney	Kirsten Gillibrand
Public Policy Polling	January 3–4, 2009	27%	58%	––	––	––	––
Quinnipiac	January 8–12, 2009	24%	31%	2%	––	6%	5%
Marist	January 12–14, 2009	25%	40%	5%	6%	5%	3%
Research 2000	January 12–14, 2009	31%	26%	2%	––	––	––

=== Polling ===
Poll Source	Dates administered	Kirsten Gillibrand	Carolyn McCarthy	Carolyn Maloney	Bill Thompson	Harold Ford Jr.	Eliot Spitzer	Jonathan Tasini	Undecided
Quinnipiac	February 10–15, 2009	24%	34%	––	––	––	––	––	––
Marist Poll	February 25–26, 2009	36%	33%	––	––	––	––	––	––
Qunnipiac	April 1–5, 2009	29%	33%	––	––	––	––	––	––
Politico	June 9, 2009	25%	––	49%	––	––	––	––	––
Politico	June 9, 2009	32%	–	34%	––	––	––	––	––
Qunnipiac	June 24, 2009	23%	––	27%	––	––	––	4%	44%
Marist Poll	July 1, 2009	37%	––	38%	––	––	––	––	25%
Rasmussen Reports	July 14, 2009	27%	––	33%	––	––	––	––	30%
Marist Poll	September 17, 2009	57%	––	––	––	––	29%	––	14%
Quinnipiac	December 7–13, 2009	28%	––	––	41%	––	––	––	28%
Marist Poll	January 15, 2010	43%	––	––	––	24%	––	––	33%
Siena Poll	January 10–14, 2010	41%	––	––	––	17%	––	5%	37%
Rasmussen Reports	January 18, 2010	48%	––	––	––	23%	––	––	18%
Marist Poll	January 25–27, 2010	44%	––	––	––	27%	––	4%	25%

=== Results ===
Democratic Primary results
Party	Candidate	Votes	%
Democratic	Kirsten Gillibrand (Incumbent)	464,512	76.1%
Democratic	Gail Goode	145,491	23.9%
Total votes		610,003	100.00%

== Republican primary ==
The Republican primary election was held on September 14, 2010.

Congressman Peter T. King made his likely candidacy clear in December 2008, partly to mention that he was not challenging former New York City mayor Rudy Giuliani as the latter was not in the running and partly to counter the wave of publicity for Caroline Kennedy. By January 2009, King was still deliberating over whether he would run, with the main factor being whether he could raise the estimated millions he would need. National Republican Senatorial Committee Chair John Cornyn was said to support King, which could keep other Republican contenders out of play. However, Cornyn reportedly met with former Governor George Pataki to discuss his potential candidacy, which other Republicans were advocating. In June 2009, due to an appointment to the House Intelligence Committee, King said he was much less likely to run. As August 2009 closed, King announced officially that he would not run, saying: "Senator Gillibrand generates neither strong support nor opposition. This makes it virtually impossible for me to raise the campaign funds I would need to overcome the built-in Democratic registration advantage and the countless millions of dollars which the Democrats will make available to Senator Gillibrand." In September 2009, Giuliani reiterated that he had no interest at all in running for the Senate seat, though, much like Andrew Cuomo's anticipated desire to run for governor, it did not stop speculation that Giuliani might change his mind, and by October 2009, speculation continued that Giuliani would run for the Senate seat, particularly if Cuomo ran for governor. On November 19, 2009, the New York Daily News reported Giuliani would not run for governor, and in fact would run for the Senate to fill out the last two years of the Clinton term, then use that as a springboard for another presidential run. However, a Giuliani spokesperson quickly dismissed the notion that any such plan was in place, saying "When Mayor Giuliani makes a decision about serving in public office, he will inform New Yorkers on his own." On November 26, 2009, Mayor of Larchmont Liz Feld said she's considering running for the seat.

In January 2010, Congressman Peter T. King said he was reconsidering running for the seat. Real estate magnate and publisher Mort Zuckerman was seriously considering a bid by February 2010. Nominally a Democrat, Zuckerman was more likely to run as a Republican or independent in order to avoid an expensive primary fight. But in early March, he indicated he would not run, saying he had not the time to do it. In April 2010, despite a Quinnipiac University Polling Institute result placing him five points ahead of Gillibrand in a potential matchup, Pataki removed himself from consideration. The former governor instead said he would instead run an organization dedicating itself to repealing the Affordable Care Act.

Bruce Blakeman, a former Nassau County legislator and losing candidate in the New York Comptroller election, 1998, was the first to enter the race, doing so in February 2010. On March 16, 2010, former U.S. Representative Joe DioGuardi announced his entrance into the race, followed shortly by economist David Malpass. Blakeman and Malpass gained the requisite 25% of delegate votes at the state Republican convention in June 2010, with Blakeman gaining the majority of delegate votes to be the designated nominee; DioGuardi did not, despite leading in primary polls and having the Conservative Party endorsement. DioGuardi filed over 25,000 petitions to get onto the primary ballot and was eligible to compete against Blakeman and Malpass in the Republican primary.

Each candidate had an additional ballot line to run on regardless of whether they won the Republican primary; DioGuardi was backed by the Conservative Party of New York State, Malpass by Carl Paladino's Taxpayers Party of New York, and Blakeman by the Nassau County-based Tax Revolt Party. Malpass cleared the Taxpayers line after the primary loss and ceded it to DioGuardi, but Blakeman remained on the general election ballot as the TRP candidate.

=== Candidates ===
- Bruce Blakeman, Port Authority Commissioner and 1998 comptroller candidate
- Joe DioGuardi, former U.S. Representative
- David Malpass, founder of Encima Global and former chief economist at Bear Stearns

Declined

- Ed Diana, Orange County Executive
- Liz Feld, mayor of Larchmont
- Rudy Giuliani, former Mayor of New York City and candidate for Senate in 2000
- Peter T. King, U.S. Representative
- Brian Kolb, Minority Leader of the New York Assembly
- Susan Molinari, former U.S. Representative
- George Pataki, former governor of New York
- Dan Senor, former adviser to President George W. Bush
- Diana Taylor, de facto First Lady of New York City and former state banking superintendent
- C. Scott Vanderhoef, Rockland County Executive and nominee for Lieutenant Governor in 2006
- Mort Zuckerman, owner of the New York Daily News

=== Polling ===
Poll Source	Dates Administered	Bruce Blakeman	Joe DioGuardi	David Malpass	Undecided
Siena College	May 17–20, 2010	8%	15%	4%	74%
Siena College	June 7–9, 2010	7%	21%	3%	69%
Siena College	July 2010	7%	25%	5%	63%
Quinnipiac	July 20–26, 2010	19%	––	12%	62%

=== Results ===
Results by county: DioGuardi: 30–40%; 40–50%; 50–60%; Malpass: 30–40%; 40–50%

Republican Primary results
Party	Candidate	Votes	%
Republican	Joe DioGuardi	185,483	41.8%
Republican	David Malpass	167,151	37.7%
Republican	Bruce Blakeman	91,312	20.5%
Total votes		443,946	100.0%

== General election ==
=== Candidates ===
Major

- Democratic: Kirsten Gillibrand
- Republican: Joe DioGuardi

Minor

- Anti-Prohibition Party: Vivia Morgan
- Conservative Party: Joe DioGuardi
- Green Party: Cecile Lawrence
- Independence Party: Kirsten Gillibrand
- Libertarian Party: John Clifton
- Rent Is Too Damn High Party: Joseph Huff
- Taxpayers Party: Joe DioGuardi (originally David Malpass)
- Tax Revolt Party: Bruce Blakeman
- Working Families Party: Kirsten Gillibrand

=== Campaign ===
Gillibrand claimed to be an independent thinker and takes a back seat to no one. She also released television advertising touting her experience as from upstate New York. DioGuardi criticized Gillibrand's recent photos in Vogue magazine.

=== Debates ===
- October 16 on WABC-TV
- October 21 in Russell Sage College in Troy on NY1

=== Predictions ===
Source	Ranking	As of
Cook Political Report	Solid D	October 31, 2010
Rothenberg	Safe D	October 28, 2010
RealClearPolitics	Likely D	October 31, 2010
Sabato's Crystal Ball	Safe D	October 28, 2010
CQ Politics	Safe D	October 31, 2010

=== Polling ===
Poll source	Dates administered	Joe DioGuardi (R)	Kirsten Gillibrand (D)
Marist Poll	March 29, 2010	27%	54%
Rasmussen Reports	May 12, 2010	38%	51%
Marist Poll	June 9, 2010	29%	47%
Rasmussen Reports	June 16, 2010	38%	49%
Marist Poll	July 12, 2010	29%	51%
Rasmussen Reports	August 3, 2010	33%	50%
Rasmussen Reports	September 1, 2010	31%	51%
Rasmussen Reports	September 16, 2010	39%	49%
Quinnipiac	September 16–20, 2010	42%	48%
Survey USA	September 20–21, 2010	44%	45%
Marist Poll	September 19–22, 2010	41%	52%
Public Policy Polling	October 6, 2010	40%	50%
CNN/Time	October 1–5, 2010	41%	55%
Quinnipiac	October 8, 2010	34%	55%
Survey USA	October 13, 2010	44%	55%
New York Times	October 15–18, 2010	19%	65%
Rasmussen Reports	October 18, 2010	33%	54%
Siena Poll	October 21, 2010	31%	60%
Angus Reid Public Opinion	October 28–29, 2010	38%	59%
SurveyUSA	October 25–28, 2010	36%	56%
Siena College	October 27–30, 2010	37%	57%

=== Fundraising ===
Candidate (Party)	Receipts	Disbursements	Cash On Hand	Debt
Kirsten Gillibrand (D)	$12,900,217	$11,147,100	$1,955,216	$0
Joe DioGuardi (R)	$2,969,087	$2,694,853	$274,504	$500,000
Source: Federal Election Commission

=== Results ===

United States Senate special election in New York, 2010
Party	Candidate	Votes	%	±%
Democratic	Kirsten Gillibrand	2,478,163	54.99%	−5.12
Working Families	Kirsten Gillibrand	182,624	4.05%	+0.74
Independence	Kirsten Gillibrand	175,574	3.90%	+0.32
Total	Kirsten Gillibrand (incumbent)	2,836,361	62.94%	−4.06
Republican	Joe DioGuardi	1,337,514	29.68%	+2.67
Conservative	Joe DioGuardi	244,320	5.42%	+1.43
Total	Joe DioGuardi	1,581,834	35.10%	+4.09
Green	Cecile A. Lawrence	35,497	0.79%	−0.45
Libertarian	John Clifton	18,407	0.41%	−0.06
Rent Is Too Damn High	Joseph Huff	17,021	0.38%	N/A
Anti-Prohibition	Vivia Morgan	11,773	0.26%	N/A
Tax Revolt	Bruce Blakeman	4,522	0.10%	N/A
Write-in	Write-in	1,211	0.03%	N/A
Total votes		4,506,626	100.00%	
Democratic hold				

==== Results by county ====
County	Kirsten Gillibrand Democratic		Joseph DioGuardi Republican		Various candidates	
County	#	%	#	%	#	%
Albany	66,787	65.9%	32,324	31.9%	2,306	2.2%
Allegany	6,010	47.0%	6,523	51.0%	248	2.0%
Bronx	146,356	87.5%	18,401	11.0%	2,510	1.5%
Broome	33,499	56.1%	24,899	41.7%	1,271	2.2%
Cattaraugus	11,027	51.5%	9,908	46.3%	478	2.2%
Cayuga	11,669	54.4%	9,135	42.6%	638	3.0%
Chautauqua	20,647	54.0%	16,791	43.9%	824	2.1%
Chemung	13,386	56.4%	10,023	42.2%	327	1.4%
Chenango	7,103	51.9%	6,156	45.0%	423	3.1%
Clinton	13,326	61.1%	8,034	36.8%	445	2.1%
Columbia	14,981	63.4%	8,222	34.8%	438	1.8%
Cortland	7,399	55.2%	5,656	42.2%	349	2.6%
Delaware	7,114	52.7%	6,086	45.1%	295	2.2%
Dutchess	45,740	54.7%	36,457	43.6%	1,366	1.7%
Erie	175,311	60.9%	105,569	36.7%	6,961	2.4%
Essex	7,504	61.0%	4,557	37.0%	245	2.0%
Franklin	7,191	62.0%	4,148	35.8%	260	2.2%
Fulton	7,203	49.3%	7,106	48.7%	295	2.0%
Genesee	8,056	46.9%	8,675	50.5%	444	2.6%
Greene	8,308	52.1%	7,365	46.2%	277	1.7%
Hamilton	1,175	46.0%	1,314	51.4%	66	2.6%
Herkimer	10,456	56.6%	7,663	41.5%	350	1.9%
Jefferson	15,532	60.1%	9,885	38.3%	408	1.6%
Kings	303,779	79.4%	70,554	18.4%	8,279	2.2%
Lewis	3,841	54.9%	2,987	42.7%	172	2.4%
Livingston	9,278	49.1%	9,148	48.4%	459	2.5%
Madison	11,018	53.8%	8,780	42.9%	676	3.3%
Monroe	127,790	57.5%	89,827	40.4%	4,783	2.1%
Montgomery	7,198	52.8%	6,147	45.1%	288	2.1%
Nassau	202,601	53.4%	171,265	45.2%	5,442	1.4%
New York	287,749	83.2%	49,794	14.4%	8,197	2.4%
Niagara	34,483	54.7%	27,033	42.9%	1,489	2.4%
Oneida	37,820	57.4%	26,774	40.7%	1,266	1.9%
Onondaga	83,056	59.9%	51,473	37.1%	4,116	3.0%
Ontario	17,250	51.8%	15,265	45.9%	764	2.3%
Orange	51,411	54.3%	41,468	43.8%	1,797	1.9%
Orleans	4,959	46.7%	5,383	50.7%	267	2.6%
Oswego	16,409	54.4%	12,784	42.3%	996	3.3%
Otsego	10,224	57.5%	7,167	40.3%	384	2.2%
Putnam	14,951	48.3%	15,560	50.2%	464	1.5%
Queens	247,934	75.8%	73,680	22.5%	5,444	1.7%
Rensselaer	31,836	59.4%	20,726	38.6%	1,069	2.0%
Richmond	48,551	51.0%	45,309	47.6%	1,245	1.4%
Rockland	47,068	56.5%	35,149	42.2%	1,066	1.3%
St. Lawrence	17,789	65.2%	8,890	32.6%	606	2.2%
Saratoga	45,664	56.1%	34,431	42.3%	1,247	1.6%
Schenectady	28,069	58.8%	18,643	39.0%	1,048	2.2%
Schoharie	5,224	50.7%	4,831	46.8%	258	2.5%
Schuyler	3,041	52.5%	2,642	45.6%	113	1.9%
Seneca	5,168	53.5%	4,194	43.4%	292	3.1%
Steuben	13,238	49.7%	12,849	48.2%	544	2.1%
Suffolk	199,909	52.7%	173,573	45.8%	5,883	1.5%
Sullivan	11,603	57.0%	8,250	40.5%	509	2.5%
Tioga	7,525	47.8%	7,877	50.0%	351	2.2%
Tompkins	19,878	69.6%	7,764	27.2%	929	3.2%
Ulster	36,228	61.6%	20,930	35.6%	1,680	2.8%
Warren	14,001	61.3%	8,500	37.2%	322	1.5%
Washington	11,053	61.3%	6,645	36.9%	328	1.8%
Wayne	12,221	47.2%	13,019	50.3%	665	2.5%
Westchester	151,874	60.0%	98,098	38.7%	3,212	1.3%
Wyoming	5,520	45.2%	6,314	51.7%	371	3.1%
Yates	3,370	49.1%	3,314	48.2%	186	2.7%
Totals	2,836,361	62.94%	1,581,834	35.10%	88,431	1.96%

Counties that flipped from Democratic to Republican

- Genesee (largest municipality: Batavia)
- Putnam (largest municipality: Lake Carmel)
- Tioga (largest municipality: Waverly)
- Orleans (largest municipality: Albion)
- Wayne (largest municipality: Newark)

Counties that flipped from Republican to Democratic

- Steuben (largest municipality: Corning)
