= Kirsten Gillibrand =

American lawyer and politician (born 1966)

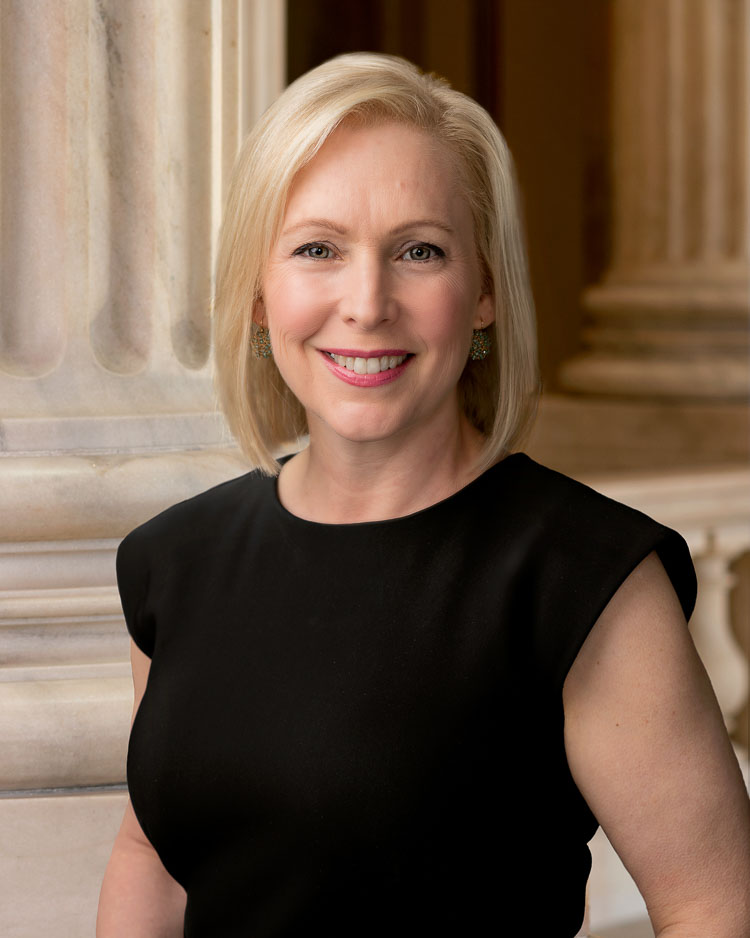
- Official portrait, 2019

Ranking Member of the Senate Aging Committee
- Incumbent
- Assumed office January 3, 2025
- Preceded by: Mike Braun

Chair of the Democratic Senatorial Campaign Committee
- Incumbent
- Assumed office January 3, 2025
- Leader: Chuck Schumer
- Vice Chairs: Mark Kelly; Adam Schiff; Lisa Blunt Rochester
- Preceded by: Gary Peters

United States Senator from New York
- Incumbent
- Assumed office January 26, 2009 Serving with Chuck Schumer
- Preceded by: Hillary Clinton

Member of the U.S. House of Representatives from New York's 20th district
- In office January 3, 2007 – January 26, 2009
- Preceded by: John E. Sweeney
- Succeeded by: Scott Murphy

Personal details
- Born: Kirsten Elizabeth Rutnik; December 9, 1966 (age 59) Albany, New York, U.S.
- Party: Democratic
- Spouse: Jonathan Gillibrand (m. 2001)
- Children: 2
- Education: Dartmouth College (BA); University of California, Los Angeles (JD)
- Website: Senate website Campaign website
- Gillibrand's voice Gillibrand supporting the Honoring our PACT Act of 2022. Recorded August 2, 2022

Kirsten Elizabeth Gillibrand (née Rutnik; /ˈkɪərstən ˈdʒɪlɪbrænd/ KEER-stən JIL-ib-rand; born December 9, 1966) is an American lawyer and politician serving as the junior United States senator from New York since 2009. A member of the Democratic Party, she served as a member of the U.S. House of Representatives from 2007 to 2009.

Born and raised in upstate New York, Gillibrand graduated from Dartmouth College and from the UCLA School of Law. After holding positions in government and private practice and working on Hillary Clinton's 2000 U.S. Senate campaign, Gillibrand was elected to the United States House of Representatives in 2006. She represented New York's 20th congressional district and was reelected in 2008. During her House tenure, Gillibrand was a Blue Dog Democrat noted for voting against the Emergency Economic Stabilization Act of 2008.

After Clinton was appointed U.S. Secretary of State in 2009, Governor David Paterson selected Gillibrand to fill the Senate seat Clinton had vacated, making her New York's second female senator. She won a special election in 2010 to keep the seat, and was reelected to full terms in 2012, 2018, and 2024. During her Senate tenure, Gillibrand has promoted legislation relating to sexual assault in the military, gun trafficking, 9/11 health care, toxic burn pit exposure, stock trading by members of Congress, and the repeal of Don't ask, don't tell. She also supports paid family leave. Gillibrand serves on the Senate Appropriations Committee, the Armed Services Committee, and the Select Committee on Intelligence, and is the ranking member on the Special Committee on Aging.

Gillibrand ran for the Democratic nomination for president of the United States in 2020, officially announcing her candidacy on March 17, 2019. After failing to qualify for the third debate, she withdrew from the race on August 28, 2019.

== Early life and education ==
Kirsten Elizabeth Rutnik was born on December 9, 1966, in Albany, New York, the daughter of Polly Edwina (Noonan) and Douglas Paul Rutnik. Both her parents are attorneys, and her father has also worked as a lobbyist. Her parents divorced in the late 1980s. Douglas Rutnik is an associate of former U.S. Senator Al D'Amato. Gillibrand has an older brother and a younger sister. Her maternal grandparents were businessman Peter Noonan and Dorothea "Polly" Noonan, a founder of the Albany Democratic Women's Club and a leader of the city's Democratic political machine. Gillibrand has English, Austrian, Scottish, German, and Irish ancestry.

Polly Noonan was a longtime confidante of Erastus Corning 2nd, the longtime mayor of Albany, New York. In Off the Sidelines, her 2014 memoir, Gillibrand said that Corning "was simply part of our family... He appeared at every family birthday party with the most fantastic present". Gillibrand wrote that she did not know that the ambiguous relationship between her married grandmother and the married Corning "was strange" until she grew up, adding that Corning "may have been in love with my grandmother", but that he also loved her grandmother's entire family. According to The New York Times, Corning, "in effect, disinherited his wife and children" and "left the Noonan family his insurance business". (Note: For more information on the Corning-Noonan relationship, see: Grondahl, Paul (2007). Mayor Erastus Corning: Albany Icon, Albany Enigma. Albany: State University of New York Press. ISBN 978-0-7914-7294-1.)

During her childhood and college years, Gillibrand used the nickname "Tina"; she began using her birth name a few years after law school. In 1984, she graduated from Emma Willard School, an all-girls' private school in Troy, New York, and then enrolled at Dartmouth College. Gillibrand majored in Asian Studies, studying in both Beijing and Taiwan. In Beijing, she studied and lived with actress Connie Britton at Beijing Normal University. Gillibrand graduated magna cum laude in 1988. At Dartmouth, she was a member of the Kappa Kappa Gamma sorority. During college, Gillibrand interned at Senator Al D'Amato's Albany office. She received her Juris Doctor from the UCLA School of Law and passed the bar exam in 1991.

== Legal career ==
=== Private practice ===
In 1991, Gillibrand joined the Manhattan-based law firm Davis Polk & Wardwell as an associate. In 1992, she took a leave from Davis Polk to serve as a law clerk to Judge Roger Miner of the United States Court of Appeals for the Second Circuit in Albany.

Gillibrand's tenure at Davis Polk included serving as a defense attorney for tobacco company Philip Morris during major litigation, including both civil lawsuits and U.S. Justice Department criminal and civil racketeering and perjury probes. As a junior associate in the mid-1990s, she defended the company's executives against a criminal investigation into whether they had committed perjury in their testimony before Congress when they claimed that they had no knowledge of a connection between tobacco smoking and cancer. Gillibrand worked closely on the case and became a key part of the defense team. As part of her work, she traveled to the company's laboratory in Germany, where she interviewed scientists about the company's alleged research into the connection. The inquiry was dropped and it was during this time that she became a senior associate.

While working at Davis Polk, Gillibrand became involved in—and later the leader of—the Women's Leadership Forum, a program of the Democratic National Committee. Gillibrand has said that a speech to the group by Hillary Clinton inspired her: "[Clinton] was trying to encourage us to become more active in politics and she said, 'If you leave all the decision-making to others, you might not like what they do, and you will have no one but yourself to blame.' It was such a challenge to the women in the room. And it really hit me: She's talking to me."

In 2001, Gillibrand became a partner in the Manhattan office of Boies, Schiller & Flexner. In 2002 she informed Boies of her interest in running for office and was permitted to transfer to the firm's Albany office. She left Boies in 2005 to begin her 2006 campaign for Congress.

=== Public interest and government service ===
Gillibrand has said her work at private law firms allowed her to take on pro bono cases defending abused women and their children and tenants seeking safe housing after lead paint and unsafe conditions were found in their homes. After her time at Davis Polk, she served as Special Counsel to Secretary of Housing and Urban Development (HUD) Andrew Cuomo during the last year of the Clinton administration. Gillibrand worked on HUD's Labor Initiative and its New Markets Initiative, on TAP's Young Leaders of the American Democracy, and on strengthening Davis–Bacon Act enforcement.

In 1999, Gillibrand began working on Hillary Clinton's 2000 U.S. Senate campaign, focusing on campaigning to young women and encouraging them to join the effort. Many of those women later worked on Gillibrand's campaigns. She and Clinton became close during the election, with Clinton becoming something of a mentor to her. Gillibrand donated more than $12,000 to Clinton's Senate campaigns.

== U.S. House of Representatives (2007–2009) ==
=== Elections ===
==== 2006 ====
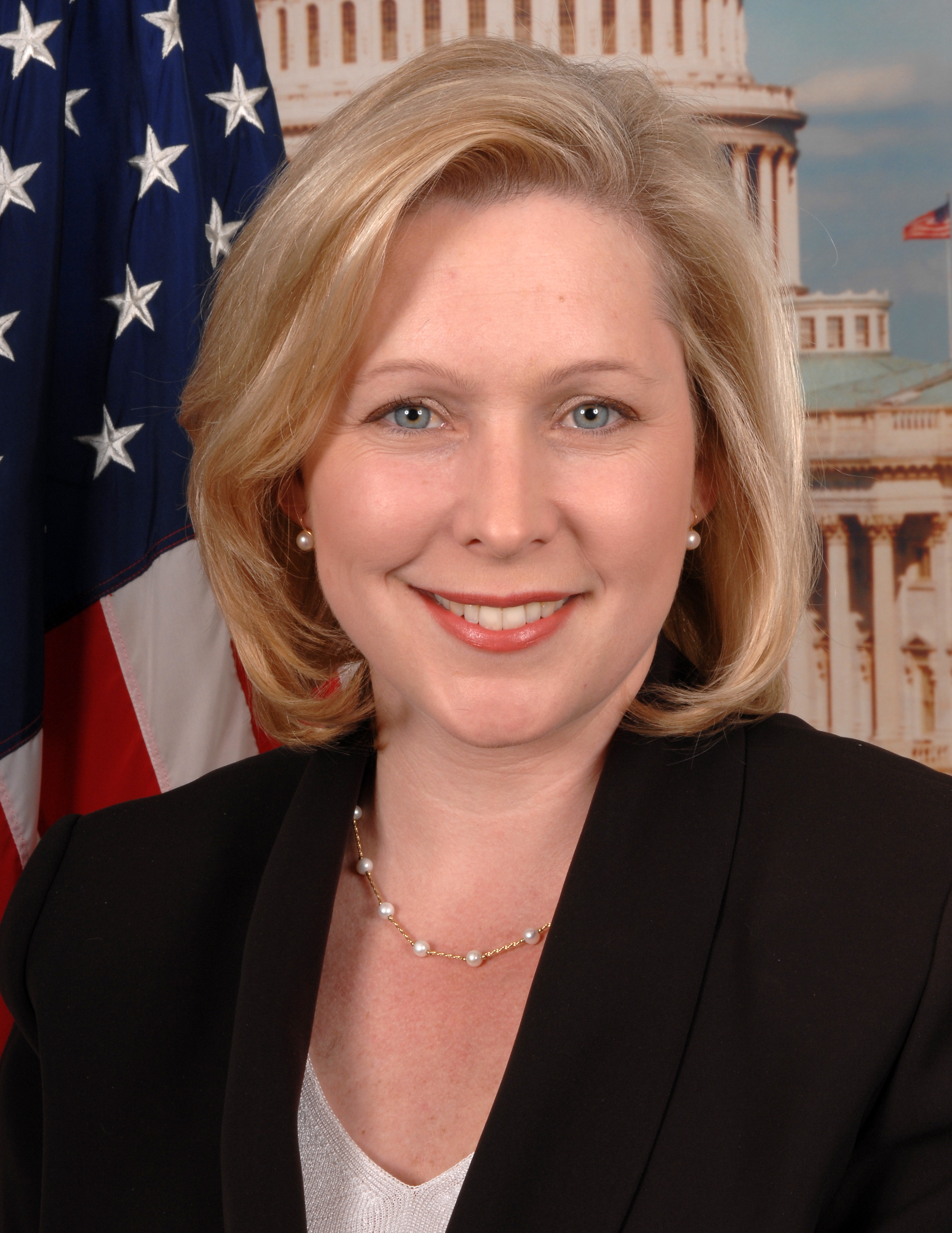
Gillibrand's portrait, November 2006

Gillibrand considered running for office in 2004, in New York's 20th congressional district, against four-term Republican incumbent John E. Sweeney, but Hillary Clinton believed circumstances would be more favorable in 2006 and advised her to wait until then. Traditionally conservative, the district and its electoral offices had been in Republican hands for all but four years since 1913, and as of November 2006, 197,473 voters in the district were registered Republicans and 82,737 were registered Democrats. Sweeney said in 2006 that "no Republican can ever lose [the district]". Using New York's electoral fusion election laws, Gillibrand ran in 2006 on both the Democratic and Working Families lines; in addition to having the Republican nomination, Sweeney was endorsed by the Conservative and Independence parties.

During the campaign, Gillibrand got support from other Democratic Party politicians. Mike McNulty, a Democratic Congressman from the neighboring 21st congressional district, campaigned for her, as did both Hillary and Bill Clinton; the former president appeared twice at campaign events. Both parties poured millions of dollars into the respective campaigns.

Many saw Gillibrand as moderate or conservative. Michael Brendan Dougherty in The American Conservative wrote after her victory, "Gillibrand won her upstate New York district by running to the right: she campaigned against amnesty for illegal immigrants, promised to restore fiscal responsibility to Washington, and pledged to protect gun rights."

Gillibrand's legal representation of Philip Morris was an issue during the campaign. Her campaign finance records showed that she received $23,200 in contributions from the company's employees during her 2006 campaign.

The probable turning point in the election was the November 1 release of a December 2005 police report detailing a 9-1-1 call by Sweeney's wife, in which she claimed Sweeney was "knocking her around the house". The Sweeney campaign claimed the police report was false and promised to have the official report released by state police, but did not do so. The Sweeney campaign did release an ad in which Sweeney's wife called Gillibrand's campaign "a disgrace". Several months later, Sweeney's wife said her "disgrace" statement was coerced, and that her husband was physically abusive.

By November 5, a Siena poll showed Gillibrand ahead of Sweeney 46% to 43%. She won with 53% of the vote.

==== 2008 ====
After Gillibrand's win, Republicans quickly began speculating about possible 2008 candidates. Len Cutler, director of the Center for the Study of Government and Politics at Siena College, said that the seat would be difficult for Gillibrand to hold in 2008, with Republicans substantially outnumbering Democrats in the district.

Gillibrand was reelected in 2008 over former New York Secretary of State Sandy Treadwell, 62% to 38%. Treadwell lost despite significantly outspending Gillibrand and promising never to vote to raise taxes, not to accept a federal salary, and to limit himself to three terms in office. Campaign expenditures were the second highest in the nation for a House race. Democrats generally saw major successes during the 2008 congressional elections, credited in part to a coattail effect from Barack Obama's presidential campaign.

Gillibrand's legal representation of Philip Morris was again an issue. Her campaign finance records showed that she received $18,200 from Philip Morris employees for her 2008 campaign, putting her among the top dozen Democrats in such contributions. Questioned during the campaign about her work on behalf of Philip Morris, Gillibrand said that she had voted in favor of all three anti-tobacco bills in that session of Congress. She said that she never hid her work for Philip Morris, and added that as an associate at her law firm, she had had no control over which clients she worked for. Davis Polk allowed associates to withdraw from representing clients about whom they had moral qualms.

=== House tenure ===
Upon taking office, Gillibrand joined the Blue Dog Coalition, a group of moderate to conservative Democrats. She was noted for voting against the Emergency Economic Stabilization Act of 2008, citing concerns regarding insufficient oversight and excessive earmarks. She opposed a 2007 state-level proposal to issue driver's licenses to illegal immigrants and voted for legislation that would withhold federal funds from immigrant sanctuary cities. Gillibrand also voted for a bill that limited information-sharing between federal agencies about firearm purchasers. She expressed personal support for same-sex marriage, but advocated for civil unions for same-sex couples and said same-sex marriage should be a state-level issue.

After taking office, Gillibrand became the first member of Congress to publish her official schedule, listing everyone she met with on a given day. She also published earmark requests she received and her personal financial statement. This "Sunlight Report", as her office termed it, was praised by in a December 2006 New York Times editorial as a "quiet touch of revolution" in a non-transparent system. Of the earmarking process, Gillibrand said she wanted whatever was best for her district and would require every project to pass a "greatest-need, greatest-good" test.

=== Committee assignments ===
In the House of Representatives, Gillibrand served on the following committees:

- Committee on Agriculture
  - Subcommittee on Conservation, Credit, Energy, and Research
  - Subcommittee on Horticulture and Organic Agriculture
  - Subcommittee on Livestock, Dairy, and Poultry (chair)
- Committee on Armed Services
  - Subcommittee on Seapower and Expeditionary Forces
  - Subcommittee on Terrorism and Unconventional Threats

== U.S. Senate (2009–present) ==
=== Appointment ===
On December 1, 2008, President-elect Barack Obama announced his choice of Hillary Clinton, the junior U.S. senator from New York, as Secretary of State. Clinton was confirmed by a vote of 94–2 on January 21, 2009. Just hours before being sworn in as Secretary of State, Clinton resigned her Senate seat, effective immediately. Obama's December announcement began a two-month search to fill her Senate seat. Under New York law, the governor appoints a replacement. A special election would then be held in November 2010 for the remainder of her term, which ended in January 2013.

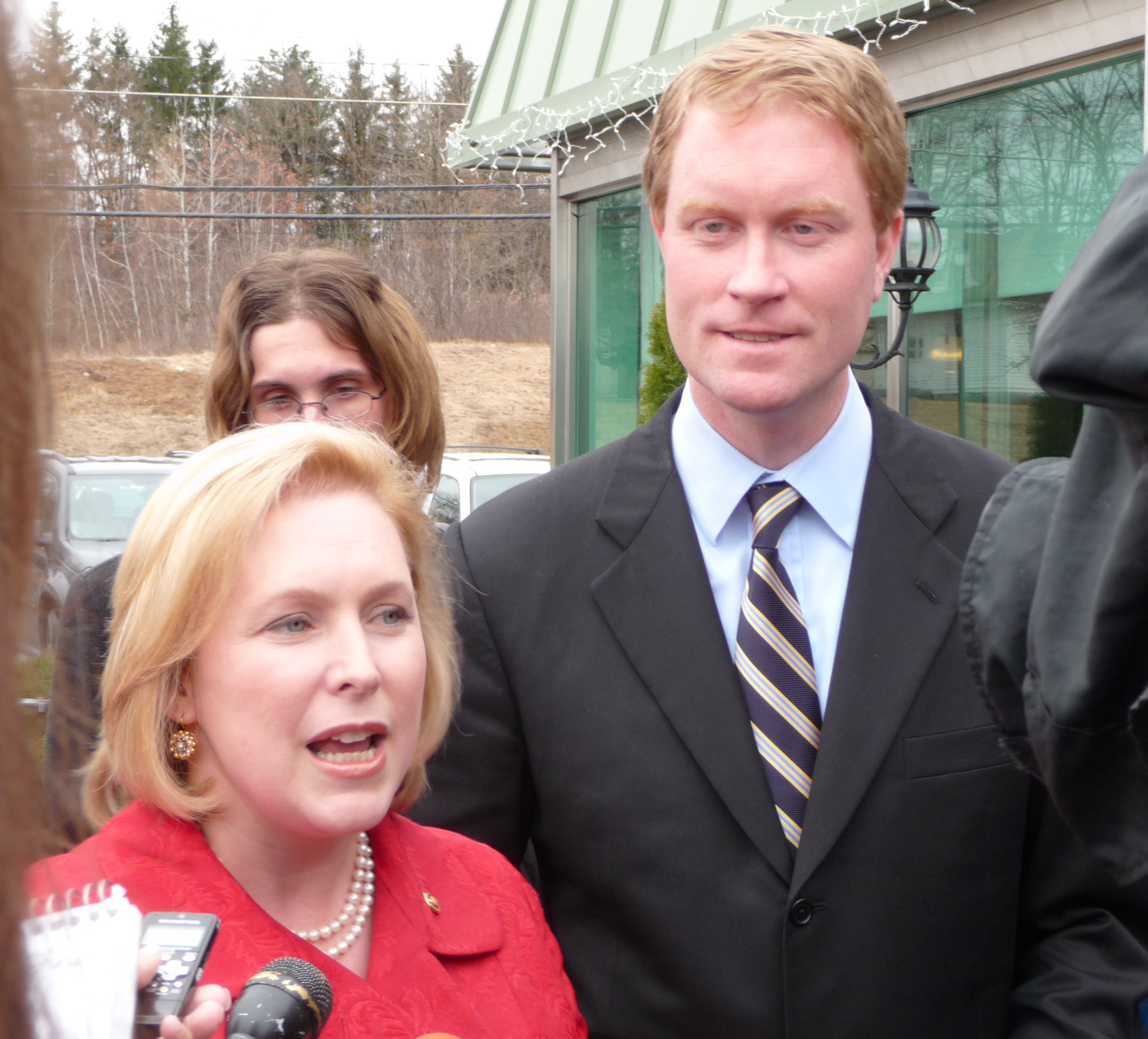
Gillibrand campaigning for her Democratic House successor Scott Murphy (2009)

Governor David Paterson's selection process began with a number of prominent names and high-profile New York Democrats, including Andrew Cuomo, Fran Drescher and Caroline Kennedy, vying for the spot. Gillibrand quietly campaigned for the position, meeting secretly with Paterson on at least one occasion. She said that she made an effort to underscore her successful House elections in a largely conservative district, adding that she could be a good complement to Chuck Schumer. Gillibrand was presumed a likely choice in the days before the official announcement. On January 23, 2009, Paterson held a press conference to announce Gillibrand as his choice.

The response to the appointment in New York was mixed. Upstate New York media was generally optimistic about the appointment of an upstate senator, as none had been elected since Charles Goodell left office in 1971. Many downstaters were disappointed with the selection, with some media outlets stating that Paterson had ignored the electoral influence of New York City and downstate on state politics. One questioned whether Paterson's administration was aware of "[where] statewide elections are won and lost". Gillibrand was relatively unknown statewide, and many voters found the choice surprising. One source stated, "With every Democrat in New York ... angling for the appointment, there was a sense of bafflement, belittlement, and bruised egos when Paterson tapped the junior legislator unknown outside of Albany."

Shortly before her appointment to the Senate was announced, Gillibrand reportedly contacted the Empire State Pride Agenda, an LGBT lobbying organization in New York, to express her full support for same-sex marriage, the repeal of the Defense of Marriage Act, the repeal of the Don't Ask, Don't Tell policy regarding gay and lesbian servicemembers, and the passage of legislation banning discrimination against transgender persons. The New York Observer wrote, "hours before Governor David Paterson called Gillibrand to inform her that she would replace Hillary Clinton in the Senate in the early morning hours of January 23, a member of the governor's camp reached out to Gillibrand to inform her that she needed to improve her lackluster standing with gay groups before she could win Paterson's appointment, according to one Democratic source".

Gillibrand was sworn in as a U.S. senator on January 26, 2009; at 42, she entered the chamber as the youngest senator in the 111th Congress. In February, she endorsed Scott Murphy, whom New York Democrats chose as their nominee for her former seat in the House of Representatives. In April, Murphy won the seat against Republican Jim Tedisco by 399 votes and succeeded Gillibrand in the House until 2011.

=== Elections ===
==== 2010 ====
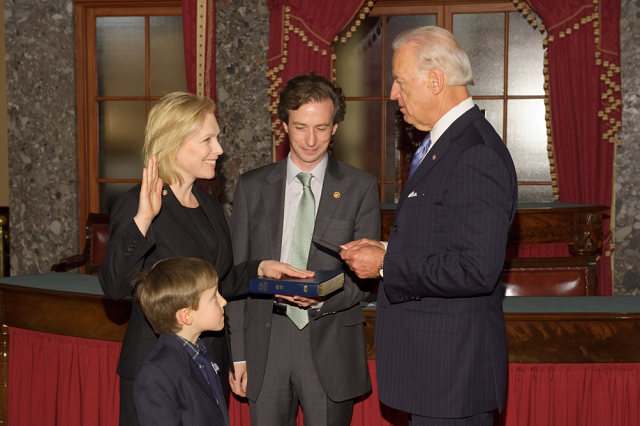
Gillibrand being sworn in for her second term by Vice President Biden (2011)

Gillibrand had numerous potential challengers in the September 14, 2010, Democratic primary election. Some were obvious at the time of her appointment. Most notably, Representative Carolyn McCarthy was unhappy with Gillibrand's stance on gun control, (Note: McCarthy has been a supporter of strict gun control since her husband was murdered in a 1993 commuter train shooting spree.) but McCarthy decided not to run. Harold Ford, Jr., a former Congressman from Tennessee, considered a run but decided against it in March 2009.

Concerned about a possible schism in the party that could lead to a heated primary, split electorate, and weakened stance, high-ranking members of the party backed Gillibrand and requested major opponents not to run. In the end, Gillibrand faced Gail Goode, a lawyer from New York City, and won the primary with 76% of the vote.

Despite what was expected to be a heated race, Gillibrand easily prevailed against former Republican congressman Joseph DioGuardi in her first statewide election. By the end of October, a Quinnipiac University Polling Institute poll showed Gillibrand leading 57%-34%. Gillibrand won the November election 63%–35%, carrying 54 of New York's 62 counties; the counties that supported DioGuardi did so by a margin no greater than 10%.

==== 2012 ====
Gillibrand's special election victory gave her the right to serve the rest of Clinton's second term, which ended in January 2013. Gillibrand ran for a full six-year term in November 2012. In the general election, she faced Wendy E. Long, an attorney running on both the Republican Party and Conservative Party lines. Gillibrand was endorsed by The New York Times and the Democrat and Chronicle. She won the election with 72.2% of the vote; in so doing, she surpassed Schumer's 71.2% victory in 2004 and achieved the largest victory margin for a statewide candidate in New York history. She carried all counties except for two in western New York.

==== 2018 ====
Gillibrand was reelected to a second term in the Senate, defeating Republican Chele Chiavacci Farley with 67% of the vote. During a campaign debate, she pledged that she would serve out a full six-year term if reelected. She was endorsed by the progressive groups Indivisible and the Working Families Party.

==== 2024 ====
Gillibrand was reelected to a third full Senate term, defeating Republican nominee Mike Sapraicone with 58.9% of the vote.

=== Senate tenure ===
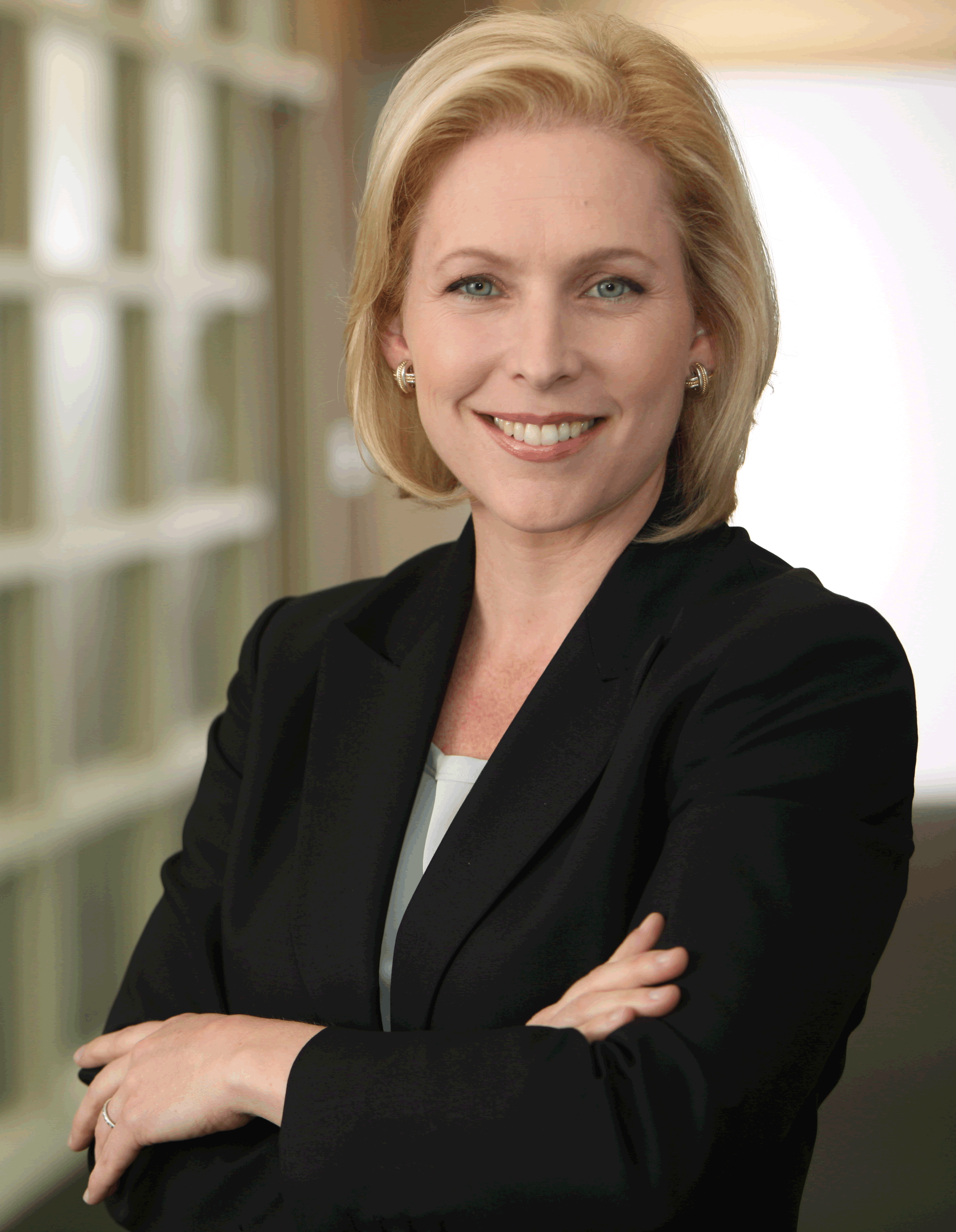
Gillibrand (2010)

A member of the Democratic Party's relatively conservative Blue Dog faction while in the House, Gillibrand has moved her political positions and ideology toward a liberal, progressive position since her appointment to the Senate.

Gillibrand made national headlines in February 2009 for stating that she and her husband kept two guns under their bed. Her staff later indicated that Gillibrand no longer stored guns under her bed.

On April 9, 2009, a combined Schumer–Gillibrand press release said that the two strongly supported a Latino being nominated to the Supreme Court at the time of the next vacancy. Their first choice was Sonia Sotomayor. The two introduced her at Sotomayor's Senate confirmation hearing in July 2009.

During the lame duck session of the 111th Congress, Gillibrand scored a substantial legislative victory with the passage of the Don't Ask, Don't Tell Repeal Act of 2010. The military's Don't Ask, Don't Tell policy, which barred openly gay and lesbian people from service, was responsible for the discharge of an estimated 14,500 service members since its creation in 1993. Gillibrand was at the forefront of the effort to repeal the ban and her advocacy was recognized as a major force behind the repeal's passage.

In January 2011, Gillibrand secured another significant win with the passage of the James Zadroga 9/11 Health and Compensation Act. The Zadroga Act reopened the September 11 Victim Compensation Fund (VCF) and established the World Trade Center Health Program (WTCHP), which provides health benefits and medical monitoring to 9/11 first responders and survivors. After these legislative accomplishments, Gillibrand gained a more prominent national profile. In 2015, Gillibrand was the Senate lead on the successful reauthorization of the Zadroga Act, which effectively made the WTCHP permanent by renewing it for 75 years and extended the VCF for 5 years. In 2019, Gillibrand helped lead the effort to pass the Never Forget the Heroes: James Zadroga, Ray Pfeifer, and Luis Alvarez Permanent Authorization of the September 11 Victim Compensation Fund Act. The bill permanently funded the VCF, allowing individuals and families of individuals who were injured, sickened, or killed at a 9/11 crash site to file claims for compensation through 2090. President Trump signed the bill into law in July 2019. In the following years, the WTCHP faced growing costs due to medical inflation and increased participation by 9/11 responders and survivors, leaving the program with a projected shortfall of roughly $3 billion. Between 2022 and 2023, Gillibrand helped secure over $1.6 billion to narrow the WTCHP funding gap, as well as extend enrollment to previously excluded 9/11 first responders at the Pentagon and Shanksville crash sites.

In 2012, Gillibrand authored part of the STOCK Act, which extended limitations on insider trading by members of Congress. A version of the bill, merged by Senator Joe Lieberman with content from another bill by Senator Scott Brown, was passed by Congress and signed into law by Obama in April. In July 2023, Gillibrand introduced bipartisan legislation with Senator Josh Hawley to ban stock ownership outright for members of Congress, senior members of the executive branch, and their spouses and dependents.

In 2013, Gillibrand began a nearly decade-long fight to reform and professionalize the military justice system. She proposed bipartisan legislation to remove the prosecution of sexual assault cases from the military chain of command and give that responsibility to independent military prosecutors. The bill failed to gain enough votes to break a filibuster in March 2014, but after years of advocacy with her colleagues, Gillibrand's bill garnered the support of a bipartisan, filibuster-proof majority of senators. In 2022, Gillibrand successfully secured provisions in the National Defense Authorization Act to shift the authority for prosecuting sexual assault and certain other serious, non-military crimes from commanders to independent, trained military prosecutors called special trial counsels.

In December 2013, Gillibrand introduced the Family and Medical Insurance Leave (FAMILY) Act. This bill would have established a national paid family and medical leave program, allowing workers to take 12 weeks of paid time off to care for a newborn, recover from a serious illness, or care for a sick family member. After it failed to pass, Gillibrand reintroduced it multiple times over the following years, earning recognition as one of the Senate's most fervent advocates for paid family leave. In December 2023, she and Bill Cassidy co-founded the Senate Bipartisan Paid Family Leave Working Group, aiming to develop bipartisan proposals for a federal paid leave policy.

By 2013, Gillibrand had "skillfully aligned herself with causes with visible, moving human characters who have helped amplify her policy goals". For example, in campaigning for the repeal of the military's "don't ask, don't tell" policy, she established a website with videos of gay and lesbian veterans telling their personal stories. She was less deferential to Senate seniority protocols and more uncompromising in her positions—such as combating sexual assault in the military—than most freshman senators, which sometimes caused friction with her Democratic colleagues. Senator Charles Grassley contrasted her approach with other New Yorkers of both parties, saying she was distinguished by "her determination and knowledge and willingness to sit down one on one with senators and explain what she is up to". Her fund-raising ability—almost $30 million from 2009 through 2013—helped her become a mentor to female candidates nationwide during that period.

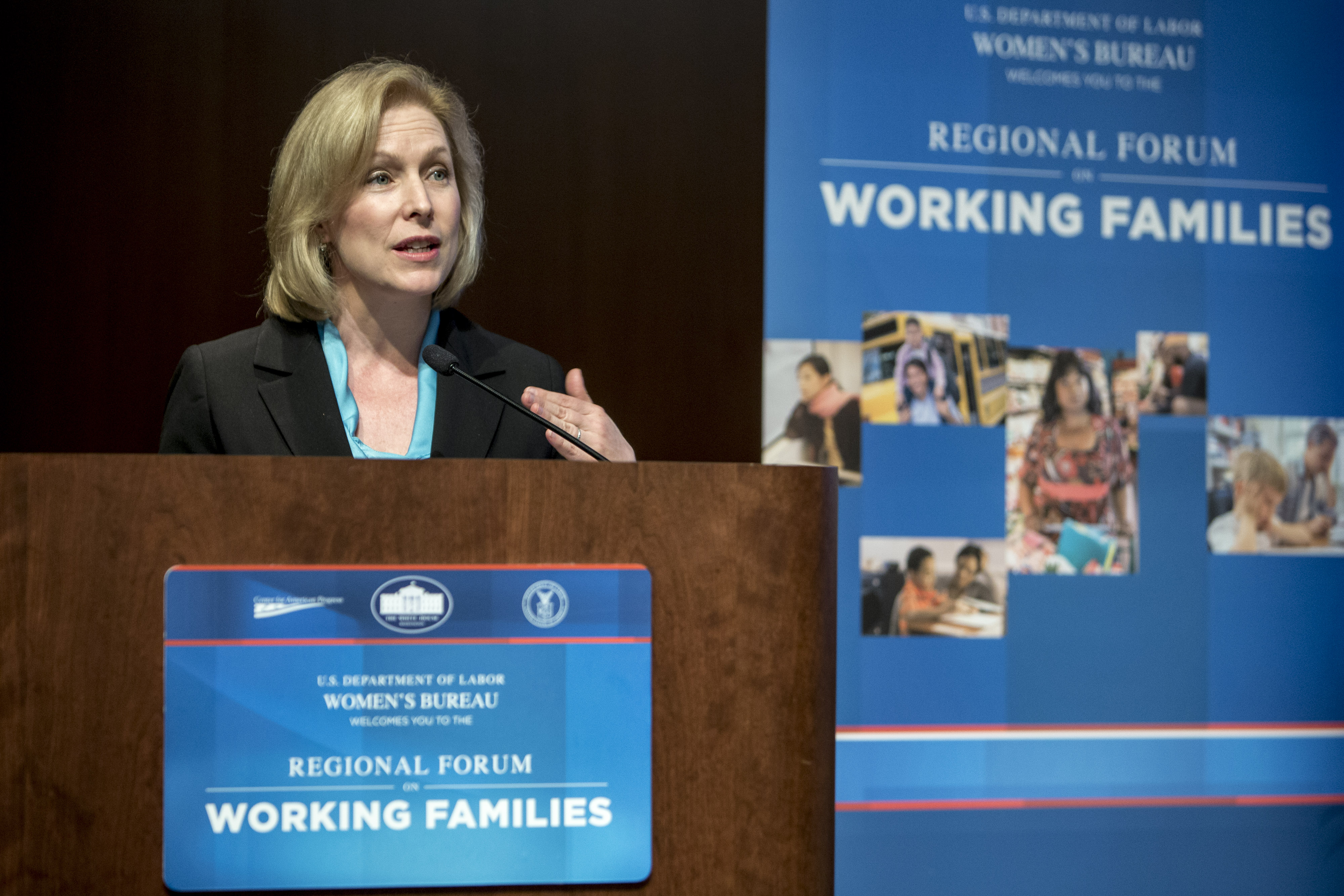
Gillibrand speaking at a White House summit (2014)

In 2014, Gillibrand was included in the annual Time 100, Time magazine's list of the 100 most influential people in the world.

In 2018, Politico named Gillibrand part of the "Hell-No Caucus", along with Senators Kamala Harris, Cory Booker, Elizabeth Warren, and Bernie Sanders, for voting "overwhelmingly to thwart [Trump's] nominees for administration jobs", such as Rex Tillerson, Betsy DeVos, and Mike Pompeo; all the senators were considered potential 2020 presidential contenders at the time, and all five ran for president in 2020.

According to a FiveThirtyEight study, 12% of Gillibrand's votes matched Trump's position during his first term, the lowest among all senators.

In 2022, Gillibrand shepherded two pieces of legislation through Congress that enacted significant workplace reforms. The first, the Ending Forced Arbitration of Sexual Assault and Sexual Harassment Act, voided forced arbitration clauses in cases of sexual assault and sexual harassment, allowing workplace sexual misconduct survivors to bring their cases to court rather than be forced into the often secretive and employer-friendly arbitration process. The second, the Speak Out Act, prohibits companies from enforcing non-disclosure agreements in cases of sexual harassment or sexual assault if those agreements were signed before the incident occurred, giving victims the ability to speak publicly about any alleged misconduct. Both bills passed the Senate unanimously and received broad bipartisan support in the House.

In June 2022, after more than a decade of advocacy, Gillibrand succeeded in passing legislation to make gun trafficking a federal crime. She first introduced the Gun Trafficking Prevention Act in 2009 after meeting the mother of Nyasia Pryear-Yard, a 17-year-old from Brooklyn who was killed by a stray bullet, and pledging to take action on guns. Gillibrand reintroduced the bill in every subsequent Congress after it failed to pass, ultimately renaming it the Hadiya Pendleton and Nyasia Pryear-Yard Gun Trafficking and Crime Prevention Act. In the wake of the Sandy Hook Elementary School shooting, Gillibrand helped craft bipartisan anti-gun trafficking legislation similar to her own, but it failed to pass the Senate after receiving 58 votes—not enough to overcome the 60-vote threshold. The core of Gillibrand's legislation passed in 2022 as part of the Bipartisan Safer Communities Act (BSCA).

In August 2022, Gillibrand helped secure the passage of the Sergeant First Class Heath Robinson Honoring Our Promise to Address Comprehensive Toxics (PACT) Act, which included her bill to extend presumptive health benefits to veterans who were exposed to toxic burn pits. She initially introduced the legislation in 2020 to provide care and benefits to veterans who were present at burn pit sites during their military service and subsequently developed certain serious illnesses, removing the need for them to prove that their conditions were definitively burn pit-related.

Since the return of congressional earmarks in 2022, Gillibrand has ranked among the top members of Congress in terms of earmark funds secured. She obtained $230.6 million in earmarks for New York-based projects in 2022 and $267 million in 2023.

=== 119th United States Congress committee assignments ===
==== Current ====
- Committee on Appropriations
  - Subcommittee on Agriculture, Rural Development, Food and Drug Administration, and Related Agencies
  - Subcommittee on Commerce, Justice, Science, and Related Agencies
  - Subcommittee on Department of Interior, Environment, and Related Agencies
  - Subcommittee on Military Construction, Veterans Affairs, and Related Agencies
  - Subcommittee on Transportation, Housing and Urban Development, and Related Agencies (ranking member)
- Committee on Armed Services
  - Subcommittee on Cybersecurity
  - Subcommittee on Emerging Threats and Capabilities
  - Subcommittee on Strategic Forces
- Special Committee on Aging (ranking member)
- Select Committee on Intelligence

==== Previous ====
Committee on Agriculture, Nutrition and Forestry (2009–2025)

Committee on Environment and Public Works (2009–2021)

Committee on Foreign Relations (2009–2011)

==== Caucus memberships ====
- Congressional Asian Pacific American Caucus
- International Conservation Caucus
- Senate Women's Caucus
- Sportsmen's Caucus
- Afterschool Caucuses

== 2020 presidential campaign ==
Gillibrand 2020
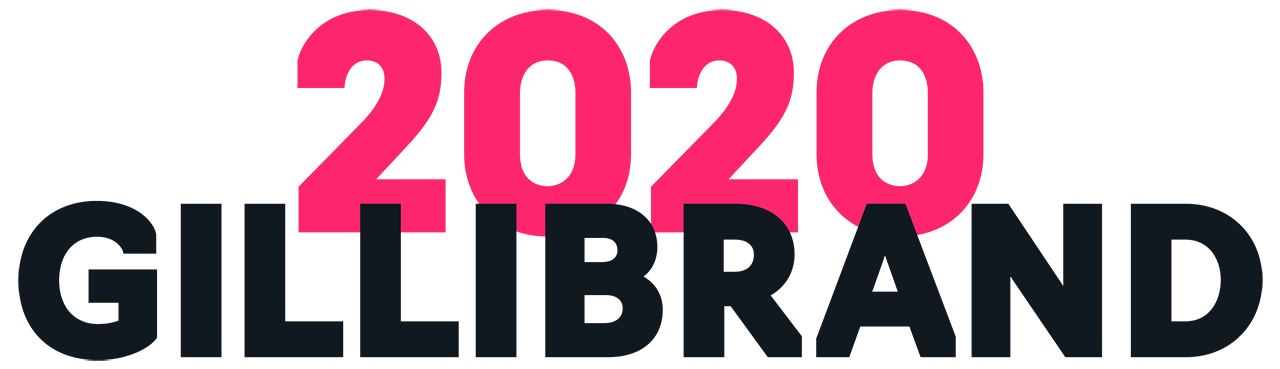
- Campaign: 2020 United States presidential election (Democratic Party primaries)
- Candidate: Kirsten Gillibrand; Senator from New York (2009–); Member of the House from New York (2007–2009)
- EC formed: January 15, 2019
- Launched: March 17, 2019
- Suspended: August 28, 2019
- Headquarters: Troy, New York
- Key people: Jess Fassler (campaign manager)
- Receipts: US$15,919,261.11 (September 30, 2019)
- Slogan: Brave Wins

=== Exploratory committee ===
In early 2019, on The Late Show with Stephen Colbert, Gillibrand announced the formation of an exploratory committee to consider running for the Democratic nomination in the 2020 United States presidential election. During her January 15 appearance, she said, "I am going to run", and the same day paperwork filed with the Federal Election Commission established the Gillibrand 2020 Exploratory Committee. Gillibrand had frequently been mentioned as a possible 2020 contender by the media before her announcement.

=== Campaign announcement and suspension ===
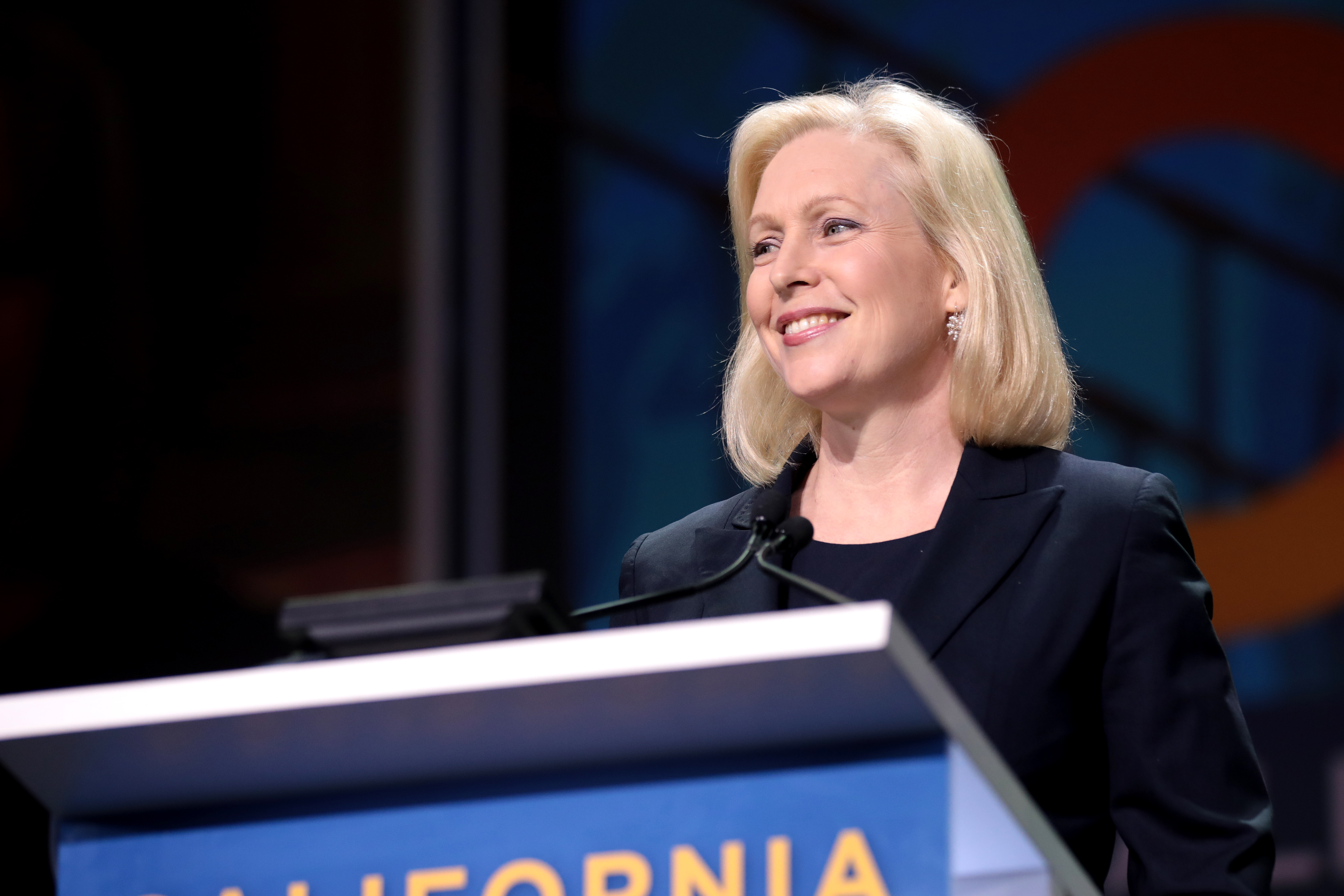
Gillibrand speaking to the California Democratic Party State Convention in June 2019.

In a Twitter post on March 17, Gillibrand announced that she was officially running for president. Like other Democratic candidates, she pledged not to accept campaign donations from political action committees.

Gillibrand was invited to the first Democratic presidential debate, participating on the second night, on June 27. She was also invited to the second debate, again participating in the second night, on July 31.

Gillibrand suspended her campaign on August 28, 2019, citing her failure to qualify for the third round of Democratic primary debates. She neither met the polling threshold nor sustained the fundraising quota set as debate qualifications.

Political pundits during and after her campaign noted that her role in pushing Senator Al Franken to resign played a major role in her failure to garner support from donors and fellow Democrats. At the time, Franken faced allegations of sexual misconduct from eight women. Gillibrand was the first senator to call on him to resign, saying "it would be better for [the] country" if he did not wait for the Senate Ethics Committee's review of the allegations. More than two dozen Democratic senators echoed this call, and Franken soon resigned. Gillibrand repeatedly doubled down on her actions, even after several Democrats expressed regret for calling for Franken's resignation. Many high-profile fundraisers and donors refused to support her, saying her actions gave her the reputation that "she would eat her own". Other publications said her attempt to brand herself as "the feminist candidate" failed to differentiate her from her rivals.

== Political positions ==
During her tenure in the House of Representatives, Gillibrand was known as a centrist Democrat and was a member of the Blue Dog Coalition. Since she became a member of the Senate, her political positions have moved leftward. In July 2018, Newsday wrote that Gillibrand "formerly held more conservative views on guns and immigration, but, in her nine years as New York's junior senator, [has] swung steadily to the left on those and other issues". After being appointed to the Senate, she expressed support for same-sex marriage. A supporter of gun rights while in the House, Gillibrand has since moved in the direction of gun control. She has said that a conversation with a family who had lost a daughter to gun violence made her realize that she was "wrong" to oppose gun control measures. In June 2018, Gillibrand called U.S. Immigration and Customs Enforcement, or ICE, a "deportation force" and became the first sitting senator to support the call to abolish ICE. She said, "I believe you should get rid of it, start over, reimagine it and build something that actually works" and "I think you should reimagine ICE under a new agency with a very different mission".

In May 2018, City & State reported that Gillibrand had "moved sharply leftward on economic issues, embracing a number of proposals to expand the social safety net and bolster lower-income families". In July 2018, The New York Times wrote that Gillibrand had "spent recent months injecting her portfolio with a dose of the kind of economic populism that infused Senator Bernie Sanders's campaign in the 2016 presidential primary".

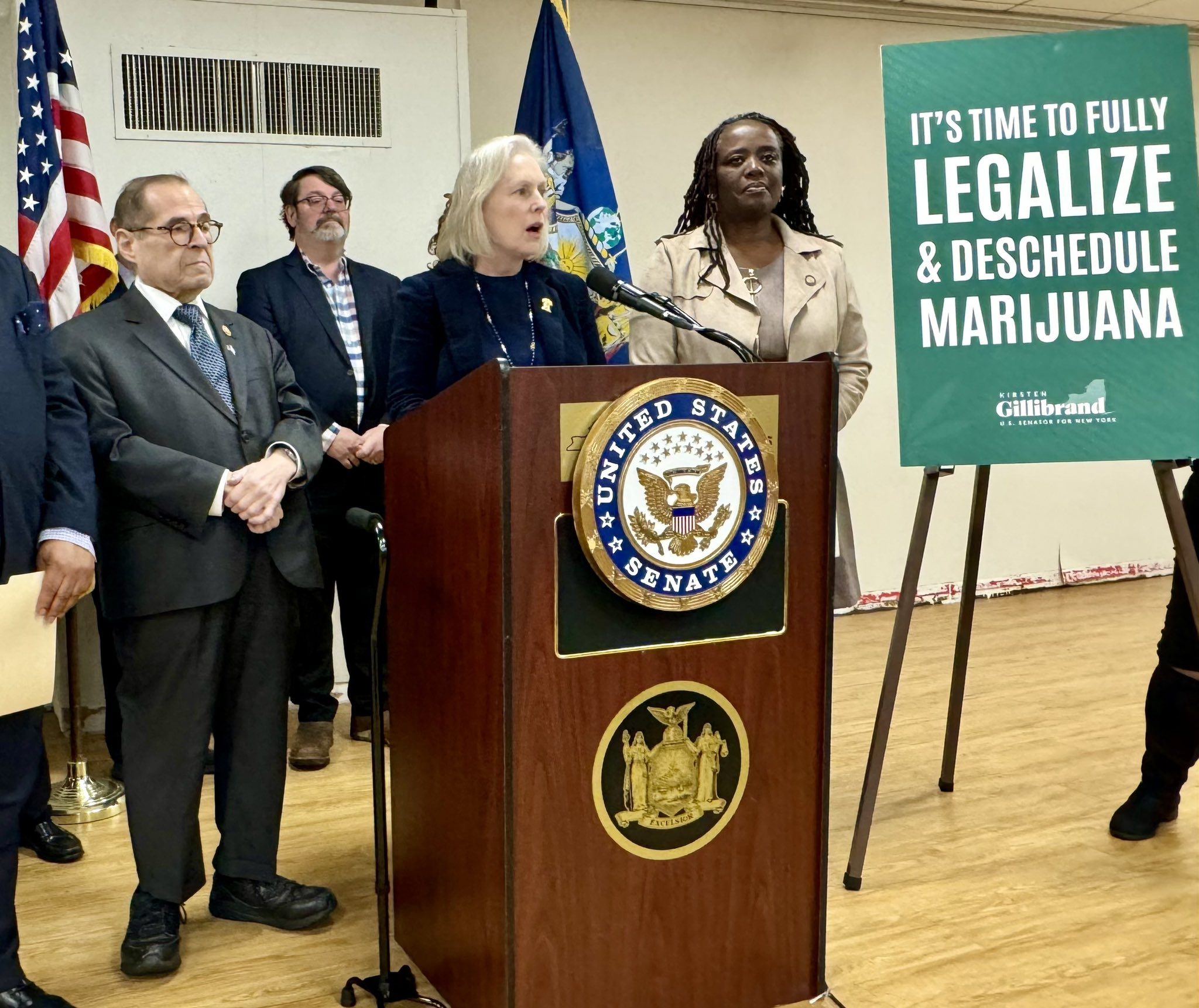
Gillibrand calls for the Biden administration to deschedule cannabis at a press conference with Representative Jerry Nadler in 2024

On social issues, Gillibrand is generally liberal, supporting the legalization of cannabis, abortion rights, and helping to lead the successful repeal effort of "Don't Ask, Don't Tell". A supporter of Medicare-for-all since her first House run in 2006, she co-sponsored a 2017 Medicare-for-all bill introduced by Sanders and said that health care should be a right. Gillibrand also supports a federal jobs guarantee. Although she used to be one of the top recipients of corporate campaign donations, in 2018 she supported rejecting corporate PAC funds and invested heavily in online fundraising. Ninety-seven percent of donations to her 2018 campaign totaled $100 or less. She advocates government transparency, being one of a few members of Congress who release much personal and scheduling information.

In 2024, Gillibrand introduced a new bill to address traumatic brain injuries in military veterans and service members. She has been critical of the second Trump administration, particularly its firing of federal employees and proposed budget cuts.

=== #MeToo movement ===
Declaring a "zero tolerance" doctrine regarding accusations of sexual misconduct by members of Congress, Gillibrand was the first in her caucus to call on Senator Al Franken to resign. In November 2017, amid the MeToo movement, Gillibrand became the first high-profile Democrat to say that Bill Clinton should have resigned when his affair with Monica Lewinsky was revealed. In 2018, Clinton expressed disagreement with Gillibrand's opinion.

In 2019, a female former aide to Gillibrand criticized her for retaining a male staffer despite the aide's sexual harassment complaint against him. After a Politico inquiry brought new evidence to light, the aide was fired.

== Controversies ==
In 2025, Kirsten Gillibrand drew criticism for her comments on former New York Governor and then-Democratic candidate for mayor of New York City Andrew Cuomo. Cuomo had resigned from his post as governor in disgrace after allegations of sexual harassment by dozens of women surfaced in August 2021. Gillibrand commented that she was troubled by the accusations, but did not call for his resignation, as she had for Franken. When Cuomo announced his candidacy for mayor, Gillibrand praised him, saying, "He has a lot of talent as an executive, he's been a very strong governor and done very good things for New York."

=== Accusations of Islamophobia ===
On June 26, 2025, two days after New York State Assemblyman Zohran Mamdani won the 2025 Democratic primary election for New York City mayor, Gillibrand appeared on Brian Lehrer's radio call-in show on WNYC. Responding to a caller who felt that Mamdani threatened the Jewish community, Gillibrand condemned Mamdani's defense of some pro-Palestine advocates using the term "intifada". She also complained about "past positions—particularly references to global jihad", prompting Lehrer to issue an on-air disclaimer that "we can find no evidence that [Mamdani] has supported Hamas or supported violent jihad". Gillibrand dismissed the disclaimer and continued to attack Mamdani's defense of the term "intifada" in the context of pro-Palestinian advocacy. When asked whether she would endorse Mamdani for mayor, Gillibrand declined, saying she did not know whether she had previously endorsed Democratic nominees for mayor and that it was not something she typically did. In 2021, Gillibrand had endorsed Eric Adams, the Democratic nominee for mayor.

After her remarks, progressive New York politicians including New York City Councilman Chi Ossé called for Gillibrand to face a primary challenge in 2030. Gillibrand has also faced calls to resign, including from journalist Mehdi Hasan, who said she "should resign for falsely smearing Zohran Mamdani as a terrorist". When asked about Gillibrand's comments, Governor Kathy Hochul said she condemned any denigration of a person's religion or ethnicity. Gillibrand's office initially issued a statement saying she "misspoke" in the interview. On June 30, she called Mamdani to apologize for her remarks.

== Personal life ==
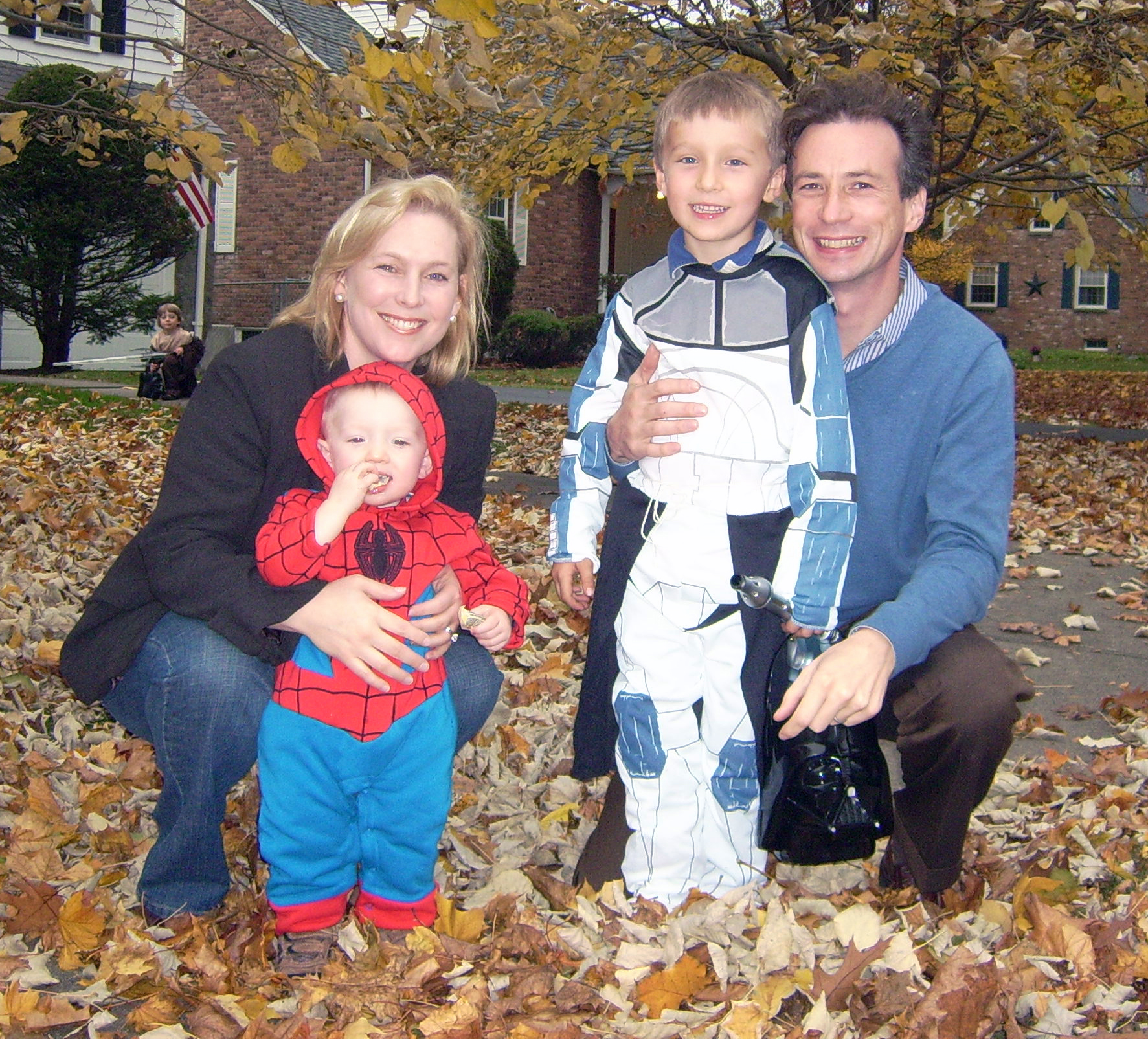
Gillibrand with her husband and sons in October 2009

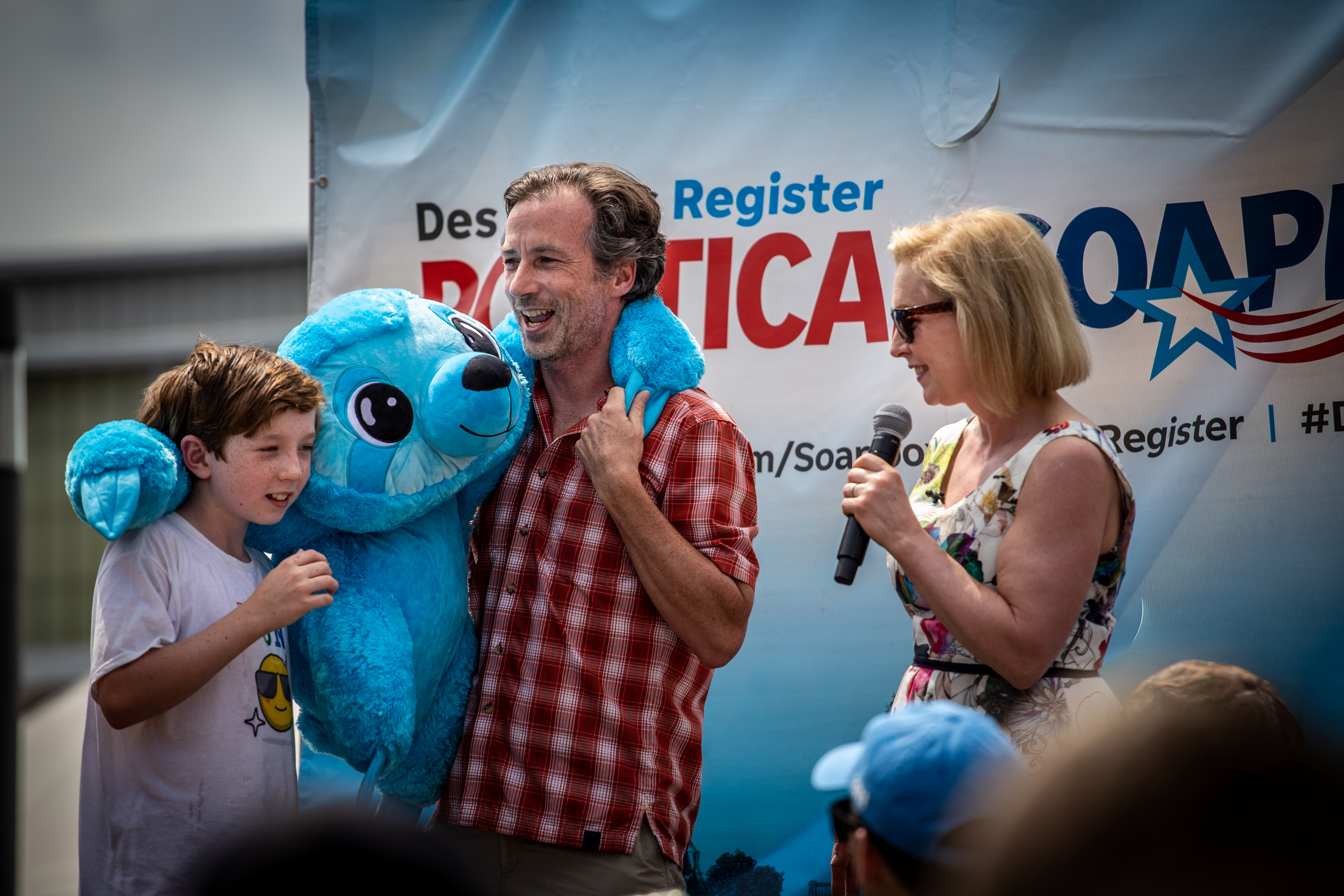
Gillibrand with her husband and son Henry during a presidential campaign appearance at the Iowa State Fair in August 2019

Gillibrand met Jonathan Gillibrand, a British venture capitalist who later became a senior adviser for oceans and international environmental and scientific affairs at the U.S. State Department, on a blind date; he was planning to be in the U.S. for only a year while studying for his MBA at Columbia University, but stayed because of their developing relationship. They married in a Catholic church in Manhattan in 2001, and have two sons.

Gillibrand continued working until the day of her first son's birth and received a standing ovation from her House colleagues for doing so. In 2011, to be closer to her family in Albany, New York, she sold her house in Hudson and purchased one in Brunswick. In 2020, the Albany Times Union reported that Gillibrand and her family primarily lived in Washington, D.C. As of 2025, Gillibrand's U.S. Senate website says she resides in Albany.

In 2026, Gillibrand's son Theodore Gillibrand created a derivatives exchange after raising $30 million from venture capital firm Lux Capital.

Gillibrand was inducted into Omicron Delta Kappa, a national leadership honor society, as an honoris causa initiate at SUNY Plattsburgh in 2012.

== Published works ==
In 2014, Gillibrand published her first book, Off the Sidelines: Raise Your Voice, Change the World. The memoir was notable in the media upon release due to whisperings of a future presidential run as well as Gillibrand's claims of sexism in the Senate, including comments other members of Congress made to her about her weight and appearance. Off the Sidelines debuted at number 8 on The New York Times Best Seller list for hardcover nonfiction.

== Electoral history ==
New York 20th congressional district election, 2006
Party	Candidate	Votes	%	±%
Democratic	Kirsten Gillibrand	116,416		
Working Families	Kirsten Gillibrand	3,839		
Total	Kirsten Gillibrand	125,168	53.10	
Republican	John Sweeney (incumbent)	94,093		
Conservative	John Sweeney	9,869		
Independence	John Sweeney	6,592		
Total	John Sweeney	110,554	46.90	
Majority		14,614		
Turnout		235,722		
Democratic gain from Republican		Swing		

2008 New York's 20th congressional district election
Party	Candidate	Votes	%	±%
Democratic	Kirsten Gillibrand	178,996		
Working Families	Kirsten Gillibrand	14,655		
Total	Kirsten Gillibrand	193,651	62.13	
Republican	Sandy Treadwell	99,930		
Conservative	Sandy Treadwell	10,077		
Independence	Sandy Treadwell	8,024		
Total	Sandy Treadwell	118,031	37.87	
Majority		75,620		
Turnout		311,682		
Democratic hold		Swing		

2010 U.S. Senate Democratic primary in New York
Party	Candidate	Votes	%
Democratic	Kirsten Gillibrand (Incumbent)	464,512	76.1%
Democratic	Gail Goode	145,491	23.9%
Total votes		610,003	100.00%

2010 U.S. Senate election in New York
Party	Candidate	Votes	%	±%
Democratic	Kirsten Gillibrand (Incumbent)	2,479,310		
Working Families	Kirsten Gillibrand	182,648		
Independence	Kirsten Gillibrand	175,631		
Total	Kirsten Gillibrand (Incumbent)	2,837,589	62.95%	
Republican	Joe DioGuardi	1,338,239		
Conservative	Joe DioGuardi	244,364		
Total	Joe DioGuardi	1,582,603	35.11%	
Green	Cecile A. Lawrence	35,487	0.79%	
Libertarian	John Clifton	18,414	0.41%	
Rent Is Too Damn High	Joseph Huff	17,018	0.38%	
Anti-Prohibition	Vivia Morgan	11,785	0.26%	
Tax Revolt	Bruce Blakeman	4,516	0.10%	
Majority		1,254,986		
Turnout		4,507,412		
Democratic hold		Swing		

2012 U.S. Senate election in New York
Party	Candidate	Votes	%	±%
Democratic	Kirsten Gillibrand	4,432,525	66.38%	+11.38%
Working Families	Kirsten Gillibrand	251,292	3.76%	−0.29%
Independence	Kirsten Gillibrand	138,513	2.07%	−1.83%
Total	Kirsten Gillibrand (incumbent)	4,822,330	72.21%	+9.26%
Republican	Wendy Long	1,517,578	22.73%	−6.96%
Conservative	Wendy Long	241,124	3.61%	−1.81%
Total	Wendy Long	1,758,702	26.34%	−8.77%
Green	Colia Clark	42,591	0.64%	−0.15%
Libertarian	Chris Edes	32,002	0.48%	+0.07%
Independent	John Mangelli	22,041	0.33%	N/A
Total votes		6,677,666	100.0%	N/A
Democratic hold				

2018 U.S. Senate election in New York
Party	Candidate	Votes	%	±%
Democratic	Kirsten Gillibrand	3,755,489	62.02%	−4.36%
Working Families	Kirsten Gillibrand	160,128	2.64%	−1.12%
Independence	Kirsten Gillibrand	99,325	1.64%	−0.43%
Women's Equality	Kirsten Gillibrand	41,989	0.69%	N/A
Total	Kirsten Gillibrand (incumbent)	4,056,931	67.00%	−5.21%
Republican	Chele Chiavacci Farley	1,730,439	28.58%	+5.86%
Conservative	Chele Chiavacci Farley	246,171	4.07%	+0.46%
Reform	Chele Chiavacci Farley	21,610	0.35%	N/A
Total	Chele Chiavacci Farley	1,998,220	33.00%	+6.66%
Total votes		6,055,151	100%	N/A
Democratic hold				

2024 United States Senate election in New York
Party	Candidate	Votes	%	±%
Democratic	Kirsten Gillibrand	4,318,903	54.01%	−8.01%
Working Families	Kirsten Gillibrand	392,395	4.91%	+2.27%
Total	Kirsten Gillibrand (incumbent)	4,711,298	58.91%	–8.09%
Republican	Mike Sapraicone	2,917,044	36.48%	+7.90%
Conservative	Mike Sapraicone	329,070	4.12%	+0.05%
Total	Mike Sapraicone	3,246,114	40.59%	+7.59%
LaRouche	Diane Sare	39,413	0.49%	N/A
Total votes		7,996,825	100.00%	N/A
Democratic hold				

== See also ==
- List of female United States presidential and vice presidential candidates
- List of United States representatives from New York
- List of United States senators from New York
- New York's congressional delegations
- Seniority in the United States Senate
- Women in the United States House of Representatives
- Women in the United States Senate

U.S. House of Representatives
Preceded by John Sweeney	Member of the U.S. House of Representatives from New York's 20th congressional district 2007–2009	Succeeded by Scott Murphy
U.S. Senate
Preceded by Hillary Clinton	United States Senator (Class 1) from New York; 2009–present Served alongside: Chuck Schumer	Incumbent
Preceded by Mike Braun	Ranking Member of the Senate Aging Committee; 2025–present	Incumbent
Honorary titles
Preceded by Michael Bennet	Baby of the Senate; 2009	Succeeded by George LeMieux
Party political offices
Preceded by Hillary Clinton	Democratic nominee for U.S. Senator from New York (Class 1); 2010, 2012, 2018, 2024	Most recent
Preceded by Gary Peters	Chair of the Democratic Senatorial Campaign Committee; 2025–present	Incumbent
U.S. order of precedence (ceremonial)
Preceded by Michael Bennet	Order of precedence of the United States as United States Senator	Succeeded by Chris Coons
Preceded by Michael Bennet	United States senators by seniority 24th	Succeeded by Chris Coons
