= Joe DioGuardi =

American politician

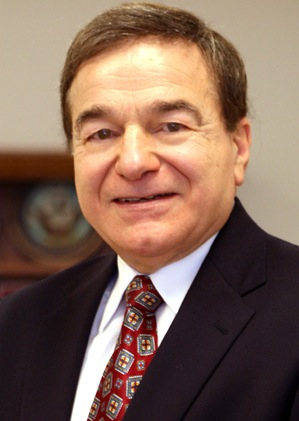

Member of the U.S. House of Representatives from New York's 20th district
- In office January 3, 1985 – January 3, 1989
- Preceded by: Richard Ottinger
- Succeeded by: Nita Lowey

Personal details
- Born: Joseph John DioGuardi; September 20, 1940 (age 86) New York City, New York, U.S.
- Party: Republican
- Spouse(s): Carol (died 1997) Shirley Cloyes
- Children: 2, including Kara
- Education: Fordham University (BS)

Joseph John DioGuardi (/ˌdiːoʊˈɡwɑːrdi/ DEE-oh-GWAR-dee; born September 20, 1940) is an American accountant and politician. DioGuardi served as a Republican U.S. Representative for New York's 20th congressional district from 1985 to 1989. He was the first Albanian American voting member of Congress. He was also the Republican nominee for U.S. Senate in New York during the 2010 special election, but lost to incumbent senator Kirsten Gillibrand.

DioGuardi, a former partner at Arthur Andersen & Co., also serves as president of the Albanian American Civic League, an organization he runs with his wife, Shirley Cloyes DioGuardi. He is the father of songwriter and record producer Kara DioGuardi.

== Early life, education, and business career ==
DioGuardi's father, Joseph Sr., immigrated to the United States from Greci, Italy. Joseph Sr. was of Arbëreshë descent, whose ancestors had immigrated to Italy some centuries earlier. His father eventually established a grocery and vegetable store in East Bronx. The family moved to Westchester County, New York, in 1957. Joseph Sr. married Grace Paparella on January 8, 1939, and the couple settled in Orchard Hills in White Plains. Their son, Joseph J., is the oldest of three DioGuardi children. After the family's move to Westchester, he attended Fordham Preparatory School. In 1957, he landed a summer job as a busboy for Elmwood Country Club in Westchester County. He advanced to a waiter position.

DioGuardi graduated from Fordham University in 1962. After college, he was hired at Arthur Andersen & Co. He became a Certified Public Accountant and achieved partner status at age 31, after 10 years at the firm. DioGuardi specialized in federal and state taxation for non-profit organizations, as well as the tax economics of charitable giving.

== U.S. House of Representatives ==
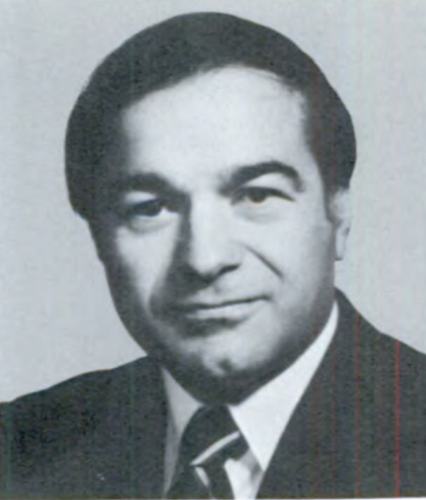
DioGuardi as a United States Congressman in 1985

=== Elections ===
1984

Incumbent Democrat U.S. Congressman Richard Ottinger of New York's 20th congressional district decided to retire in 1984. The Democratic leaning district had a sizable minority population in the cities of Mount Vernon, Yonkers and New Rochelle. DioGuardi decided to run as a Republican and defeated Oren Teicher 50%-48%.

1986

DioGuardi won re-election to a second term, defeating former U.S. Congresswoman Bella Abzug, who had relocated from Greenwich Village in Manhattan to Mount Vernon, 54%-45%.

1988

DioGuardi ran for re-election to a third term but lost to Nita Lowey, the Assistant Secretary of State of New York, 50%-47%.

Controversy

During the campaign, the Gannett-owned Gannett Suburban Newspapers accused one of the Westchester area's largest car dealers, Crabtree Automotive, of skirting federal election laws by funneling US$50,000 into DioGuardi's campaign. The New York Times reported: "Several employees explained in interviews that they were given $2,000 each in company checks and were asked to deposit them into their own bank accounts and then write personal checks for the same amount to the DioGuardi campaign. Joseph Crabtree, the company's chief executive, and his son Robert, the company's president, served on the campaign's finance committee." The Democratic Congressional Campaign Committee filed a complaint with the Federal Elections Commission and Mr. Crabtree resigned from the campaign. DioGuardi steadfastly denied the charges and his campaign also filed its own complaint with the State Board of Elections that argued, contrary to his opponent's commercial, that the employees in question put funds in a separate "People For DioGuardi" campaign account as required by law.

1992

After redistricting, Lowey decided to run in the newly redrawn New York's 18th congressional district. DioGuardi challenged her in a rematch and lost again, this time 56%-44%.

1994

Incumbent Republican U.S. Congressman Hamilton Fish IV of the neighboring New York's 19th congressional district decided to retire in 1994. DioGuardi ran in the crowded six-candidate Republican primary, which was won by Sue W. Kelly 23%-20%. DioGuardi then ran again in the general election as the Conservative Party nominee. Kelly won the general election with 52% of the vote. Hamilton Fish V, the Democratic nominee, ranked second with 37%, DioGuardi ranked third with 10%, and Catherine Portman-Laux ranked last with 1% of the vote.

1996

DioGuardi challenged Kelly in a rematch in 1996 and lost again 53%-42%. He ran in the general election on the lines of the Conservative Party and the Right-to-Life Party. He got 12% in third place, while Kelly won re-election with 46% of the vote.

2000 (U.S. Senate)

In 2000 DioGuardi launched a bid to run as the Conservative Party challenger for the 2000 Senate race as a consequence of Rudy Giuliani not running on the line. Giuliani was asked to renounce his Liberal Party endorsement, which he refused to do, hence the decision of Conservative Party Chairman Mike Long to initiate DioGuardi's campaign. DioGuardi ended this bid after Giuliani ended his campaign, and the Conservative line was given to Congressman Rick Lazio, the new Republican candidate.

2008

After Democrat John Hall defeated Kelly in 2006, DioGuardi decided to run against Hall in 2008. In May 2008, Republicans held a convention in Mahopac, New York, with delegates from each of the five counties to endorse a candidate and nominate their candidate. Kieran Michael Lalor won the convention vote with 46% of the vote, while DioGuardi finished last with 13% of the vote.

=== Tenure ===
Dioguardi voted against the Abandoned Shipwrecks Act of 1987. The Act asserts United States title to certain abandoned shipwrecks located on or embedded in submerged lands under state jurisdiction, and transfers title to the respective state, thereby empowering states to manage these cultural and historical resources more efficiently, with the goal of preventing treasure hunters and salvagers from damaging them. Despite his vote against it, President Ronald Reagan signed it into law on April 28, 1988.

He was the original author of the Chief Financial Officer and Federal Financial Reform Act (CFO Act), signed by President George H. W. Bush in 1990. The act mandated the assignment of a chief financial officer to each major department and agency of the U.S. government. Former Comptroller General of the United States Charles Bowsher later said in testimony before the U.S. Senate that since the enactment of the bill, "We have seen important progress in directly confronting serious financial management weaknesses."

Of the 1.55 million Black American military servicemen, not one had received the Medal of Honor. DioGuardi and Democratic Congressman Mickey Leland initiated legislation to confer the honor on Black World War I and World War II military heroes who had been recommended for, but had not received, the medal. Nine Medals of Honor have since been awarded.

=== Committee assignments ===
DioGuardi was an active member of the executive committee of the Congressional Human Rights Caucus (CHRC) and worked with Caucus founder Tom Lantos (D-CA) on apartheid in South Africa, and on the repression of Jews in the Soviet Union and the Tibetan people and monks in China.

=== Caucus memberships ===
He founded and co-chaired the Congressional Long Island Sound and Hudson River Caucuses, which secured substantial increases in federal support. He co-founded with Congressman Jerrold Nadler the New York Task Force for Port, Rail and Industrial Development in order to restore lost jobs to New York's manufacturing and transportation sectors and preserve a portion of the Port of New York on the New York side of the harbor.

== Albanian American Civic League ==
In the mid-1980s, Dioguardi along with a handful of Albanian-American businessmen founded the Albanian lobby, culminating in the establishment of the Albanian American Civic League (AACL) in January 1989. The lobby raised the issue of Albanian rights in Yugoslavia to the attention of U.S. policy makers in Washington. Under Dioguardi's leadership, the AACL raised millions of dollars, arranged demonstrations, testified and passed resolutions in Congress promoting the issue of Kosovo Albanians, putting pressure on U.S. administrations.

Dioguardi's influence over the Albanian American lobby later diminished with the formation of the Democratic League of Kosovo (LDK). Some former members of the Civic League defected to the LDK, citing Dioguardi's behavior and style. According to them, Dioguardi "hangs onto the Civic League in order to promote his own thinly veiled political ambitions" and "demand[s] that everything go through him, even the demonstrations". Still, political analyst Paul Hockenos noted in 2003 that "Dioguardi and the Albanian lobby as a whole still pack a formidable punch, even after the dust of the wars has settled. Its sustained activity is something the other diaspora lobbies, those associated with the former Yugoslavia, no longer muster. In contrast, they are spent forces." The AACL is run by Dioguardi and his second wife who also serves as "Balkan Affairs Adviser".

== Post-congressional career ==
=== Non-profit organization ===
In 1989, DioGuardi founded a non-profit organization that is known as Truth in Government. According to its website, "the mission of Truth in Government is to strengthen our country's financial foundation by promoting accountability and transparency in Congressional spending and reporting."

=== Book ===
In 1992, DioGuardi authored the book Unaccountable Congress: It Doesn't Add Up, published by Regnery. The book was re-released in 2010 with a new introduction that claimed to explain the chronology of events leading to the 2008 financial crisis.

=== 2010 U.S. Senate election ===
On March 16, 2010, DioGuardi announced at Grand Central Terminal in New York City that he was seeking the Republican nomination for the U.S. Senate seat held by incumbent Democratic senator Kirsten Gillibrand. Gillibrand had been appointed to the seat by Gov. Paterson after it was vacated by Hillary Clinton. DioGuardi pledged to raise over US$10 million in his campaign. He secured the nomination for U.S. Senate from the Conservative Party of New York on May 28, 2010, but did not secure enough votes from the New York Republican party contingencies at their state convention on June 2 to appear on the Republican line in the New York primary race on September 14. On August 9, the New York Board of Elections officially certified DioGuardi's qualification for the September 14th GOP primary.

During the campaign, DioGuardi attracted some press attention for his advocacy of Albanian rights and his claim that without his efforts, there would be no independent Kosovo.

DioGuardi narrowly defeated David Malpass in the primary election (with Bruce Blakeman finishing distant third), securing the Republican line in the general election. He also, after the primary, secured the line of the nascent Taxpayers Party of New York when Malpass stepped aside.

Prior to the election, DioGuardi was linked to a US$1.7 billion Ponzi scheme by the SEC. From 2007 to 2009, the former Westchester Republican congressman was paid US$5,000 a month as a consultant for the subsidiary Medical Capital Corp. – and also got US$16,000 a year to sit on boards of various other MCH subsidiaries. DioGuardi said he was oblivious to any wrongdoing. "As a consultant, Joe was tasked with saving hospitals in New York from being shut down, but knew nothing of the schemes that were occurring behind the scenes," said his spokesman Brian Hummell, adding that his boss "has never seen the books."

DioGuardi lost the general election to Gillibrand, 63.0% to 35.1%.

== Personal life ==
DioGuardi lives in Ossining, New York, with his wife, Shirley Cloyes DioGuardi. His first wife, Carol, died in 1997 of ovarian cancer. His son John is a counselor at the Phoenix House, a national non-profit drug treatment organization on whose board Joseph has served since 1972. His daughter Kara DioGuardi is a songwriter and artist who has appeared as a judge on the American Idol show, and has also been involved in Phoenix House.

U.S. House of Representatives
Preceded by Richard Ottinger	Member of the U.S. House of Representatives from New York's 20th congressional district 1985–1989	Succeeded by Nita Lowey
Party political offices
Preceded by John Spencer	Republican nominee for U.S. Senator from New York (Class 1); 2010	Succeeded by Wendy Long
U.S. order of precedence (ceremonial)
Preceded by Bob Good as Former U.S. Representative	Order of precedence of the United States as Former U.S. Representative	Succeeded by Randy Kuhl as Former U.S. Representative
