= Albanian American Civic League =

American lobby group

- Formation: January 1989
- Type: Non-governmental organization
- Headquarters: Ossining, New York
- Official language: English, Albanian
- President: Joseph J. DioGuardi
- Website: www.aacl.com

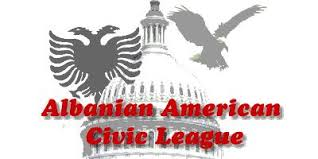
Albanian American Civic League

The Albanian American Civic League (AACL, Albanian: Lidhja Qytetare Shqiptaro-Amerikane) is the only Albanian American lobby group in Washington, D.C., representing the concerns and interests of the Albanian people in the United States and the Balkans. The Civic League was founded by former Congressman Joseph DioGuardi and a board of Albanian Americans in 1989. Since then, it has actively and effectively lobbied the United States Congress in an effort to influence U.S. foreign policy in the Balkans, including for the independence of Kosovo.

== History ==
The Albanian American Civic League was founded in January 1989 by former Albanian American Congressman Joseph J. DioGuardi and a handful of Albanian American businessmen who sought to influence the policies of the United States State Department with regard to the Balkans, particularly Kosovo. Over the years, the organization has raised millions of dollars to help promote its causes. The AACL lobbied prominent U.S. senators such as Claiborne Pell, Al D'Amato, Carl Levin, William Broomfield, Larry Pressler and most notably Eliot Engel for its cause.

== Notes ==
to be
