= Electoral history of the Conservative Party of New York State (U.S. House) =

Elections featuring American political party

This is a list detailing the electoral history of the Conservative Party of New York State, specifically that related to the United States House of Representatives, sorted by year. The list currently consists of candidates who ran for partisan office, either those who ran on the Conservative Party label or were endorsed by the party. In the case of endorsements, the vote tallied is that which the candidate received under that label.

== District 1 ==
Year	Party designee	Designee Party	# Votes	% Votes	Place	Notes
1966	Domenico Crachi, Jr.	Conservative	12,731	7.36	3rd of 4	
1968	Harold Haar	Conservative	19,470	8.83	3rd of 4	
1970	Malcolm E. Smith, Jr.	Republican	35,054	16.83	3rd of 4	
1972	Robert D.L. Gardiner	Conservative	18,627	9.53	3rd of 4	
1974	Seth Morgan	Conservative	10,038	6.45	3rd of 3	
1976	Seth Morgan	Conservative	10,269	4.95	3rd of 4	
1978	William Carney	Republican	14,529	9.07	3rd of 4	
1980	William Carney	Republican	15,174	7.42	3rd of 5	
1982	William Carney	Republican	9,515	6.89	3rd of 4	
1984	William Carney	Republican	10,405	5.16	4th of 5	
1986	Dominic J. Santoro	Conservative	4,345	3.32	3rd of 5	
1988	Edward P. Romaine	Republican	9,097	4.37	3rd of 5	
1990	Clayton Baldwin, Jr.	Conservative	6,883	5.15	3rd of 6	
1992	Edward P. Romaine	Republican	11,785	5.17	3rd of 5	
1994	Michael Forbes	Republican	10,146	5.89	3rd of 6	
1996	Michael Forbes	Republican	11,962	5.61	3rd of 6	
1998	Michael Forbes	Republican	13,032	8.40	3rd of 6	
2000	Felix Grucci	Republican	7,569	3.16	4th of 7	
2002	Felix Grucci	Republican	6,116	3.65	3rd of 7	
2004	Bill Manger	Republican	11,069	3.98	3rd of 5	
2006	Italo Zanzi	Republican	9,284	5.54	3rd of 6	
2008	Lee Zeldin	Republican	15,509	5.59	3rd of 5	
2010	Randy Altschuler	Republican	19,423	9.90	3rd of 5	
2012	Randy Altschuler	Republican	20,125	7.22	3rd of 5	

== District 2 ==
Year	Party designee	Designee Party	# Votes	% Votes	Place	Notes
1966	Edward F. Campbell	Conservative	14,820	10.17	3rd of 5	
1968	James R. Grover, Jr.	Republican	30,036	15.98	3rd of 5	
1970	James R. Grover, Jr.	Republican	32,720	20.14	3rd of 4	
1972	Didn't Endorse					
1974	Neil Greene	Conservative	7,818	6.55	3rd of 3	
1976	Peter F. Cohalan	Republican	10,143	6.34	3rd of 5	
1978	Harold J. Withers	Republican	9,531	8.07	3rd of 3	
1980	Louis J. Modica	Republican	9,143	6.13	3rd of 4	
1982	Paul G. Costello	Republican	6,677	5.27	3rd of 5	
1984	Paul Aniboli	Republican	8,909	4.99	3rd of 5	
1986	Jeffrey A. Butzke	Republican	5,195	4.79	3rd of 5	
1988	Joseph Cardino, Jr.	Republican	7,233	4.14	3rd of 5	
1990	Dominic A. Curcio	Conservative	8,150	8.01	3rd of 4	
1992	Rick Lazio	Republican	15,178	7.38	3rd of 4	
1994	Rick Lazio	Republican	13,250	9.03	3rd of 5	
1996	Rick Lazio	Republican	15,030	8.56	3rd of 5	
1998	Rick Lazio	Republican	13,329	10.38	3rd of 5	
2000	Richard N. Thompson	Conservative	10,824	5.74	4th of 7	
2002	Joe Finley	Republican	5,732	3.92	4th of 7	
2004	Richard Hoffmann	Republican	7,997	3.30	4th of 5	
2006	John W. Bugler	Republican	6,541	4.38	4th of 5	
2008	Frank Stalzer	Republican	9,496	3.94	4th of 5	
2010	John Gomez	Republican	13,525	8.05	3rd of 6	
2012	Peter T. King	Republican	19,515	8.03	3rd of 5	

== District 3 ==
Year	Party designee	Designee Party	# Votes	% Votes	Place	Notes
1968	Daniel L. Rice	Conservative	14,556	7.71	3rd of 4	
1970	Lois Camardi	Conservative	12,925	7.45	3rd of 5	
1972	Lawrence P. Russo	Conservative	14,768	7.57	3rd of 4	
1974	Angelo D. Roncallo	Republican	12,221	8.28	3rd of 4	
1976	Howard Hogan, Jr.	Republican	13,110	7.23	3rd of 4	
1978	Gregory W. Carman	Republican	11,949	8.62	3rd of 4	
1980	Gregory W. Carman	Republican	13,084	7.45	3rd of 4	
1982	John LeBoutillier	Republican	11,956	6.64	3rd of 4	
1984	Robert P. Quinn	Republican	12,318	5.23	3rd of 4	
1986	Joseph A. Guarino	Republican	8,703	5.85	3rd of 4	
1988	Robert Previdi	Republican	10,724	4.78	3rd of 5	
1990	Robert Previdi	Republican	13,390	9.77	3rd of 5	
1992	Peter T. King	Republican	16,153	6.42	3rd of 5	
1994	Peter T. King	Republican	16,608	8.54	3rd of 4	
1996	Peter T. King	Republican	15,254	6.59	3rd of 7	
1998	Peter T. King	Republican	13,869	7.07	3rd of 5	
2000	Peter T. King	Republican	7,158	2.98	4th of 8	
2002	Peter T. King	Republican	7,904	4.67	3rd of 6	
2004	Peter T. King	Republican	12,022	4.42	3rd of 4	
2006	Peter T. King	Republican	9,656	5.32	3rd of 5	
2008	Peter T. King	Republican	12,983	4.80	3rd of 5	
2010	Peter T. King	Republican	15,192	8.30	3rd of 5	
2012	Stephen Labate	Republican	14,589	5.34	3rd of 7	

== District 4 ==
Year	Party designee	Designee Party	# Votes	% Votes	Place	Notes
1966	Donald H. Serrell	Conservative	10,035	6.91	3rd of 5	
1968	John W. Wydler	Republican	19,534	11.79	3rd of 5	
1970	Donald A. Derham, Sr.	Conservative	12,701	7.89	3rd of 4	
1972	Didn't Endorse					
1974	Norman F. Lent	Republican	14,982	9.41	3rd of 4	
1976	Norman F. Lent	Republican	14,754	7.76	3rd of 4	
1978	Norman F. Lent	Republican	14,445	10.08	3rd of 4	
1980	Norman F. Lent	Republican	12,631	7.19	3rd of 5	
1982	Norman F. Lent	Republican	15,200	8.72	3rd of 5	
1984	Norman F. Lent	Republican	16,666	7.42	3rd of 5	
1986	Norman F. Lent	Republican	11,636	8.18	3rd of 5	
1988	Norman F. Lent	Republican	15,865	7.37	3rd of 5	
1990	Norman F. Lent	Republican	15,466	11.93	3rd of 5	
1992	David A. Levy	Republican	11,987	5.52	3rd of 5	
1994	David A. Levy	Conservative	15,173	8.67	3rd of 5	
1996	Daniel Frisa	Republican	10,522	4.76	3rd of 7	
1998	Gregory R. Becker	Republican	9,114	5.31	3rd of 6	
2000	Gregory R. Becker	Republican	4,996	2.21	5th of 7	
2002	Marilyn O'Grady	Republican	5,308	3.15	4th of 8	
2004	James Garner	Republican	8,636	3.40	3rd of 5	
2006	Marty Blessinger	Republican	6,929	4.42	3rd of 5	
2008	Jack Martins	Republican	7,798	3.04	3rd of 5	
2010	Fran Becker	Republican	9,455	5.36	3rd of 5	
2012	Frank Scaturro	Conservative	15,603	5.88	3rd of 5	

== District 5 ==
Year	Party designee	Designee Party	# Votes	% Votes	Place	Notes
1966	Thomas M. Brennan	Republican	15,517	8.74	3rd of 5	

== District 6 ==
Year	Party designee	Designee Party	# Votes	% Votes	Place	Notes
1966	Ronald E. Weiss	Conservative	17,863	11.52	4th of 4	

== District 7 ==
Year	Party designee	Designee Party	# Votes	% Votes	Place	Notes
1964	Erling Asheim	Conservative	3,240	1.87	4th of 4	
1966	Raymond G. Carpenter	Conservative	16,070	11.12	3rd of 4	

== District 8 ==
Year	Party designee	Designee Party	# Votes	% Votes	Place	Notes
1964	Charles P. Hostek	Conservative	5,071	2.56	4th of 4	
1966	Cyrus Julien	Conservative	13,726	8.29	4th of 4	

== District 9 ==
Year	Party designee	Designee Party	# Votes	% Votes	Place	Notes
1966	John Haggerty	Republican	16,919	11.93	3rd of 4	

== District 10 ==
Year	Party designee	Designee Party	# Votes	% Votes	Place	Notes
1968	Frank L. Martano	Republican	14,298	9.46	4th of 4	

== District 11 ==
Year	Party designee	Designee Party	# Votes	% Votes	Place	Notes
1968	Basil E. Reynolds	Conservative	3,807	6.56	3rd of 4	

== District 12 ==
Year	Party designee	Designee Party	# Votes	% Votes	Place	Notes
1968	Ralph J. Carrano	Conservative	3,771	7.19	4th of 4	

== District 13 ==
Year	Party designee	Designee Party	# Votes	% Votes	Place	Notes
1966	Michael J. Spadaro	Conservative	9,463	6.13	4th of 4	

== District 14 ==
Year	Party designee	Designee Party	# Votes	% Votes	Place	Notes
1968	Alice A. Capatosto	Conservative	5,422	8.22	3rd of 4	

== District 15 ==
Year	Party designee	Designee Party	# Votes	% Votes	Place	Notes
1964	Luigi R. Marano	Republican	3,937	3.17	3rd of 4	
1966	Herbert F. Ryan	Republican	8,504	9.13	3rd of 4	

== District 16 ==
Year	Party designee	Designee Party	# Votes	% Votes	Place	Notes
1964	David D. Smith	Republican	6,929	4.76	3rd of 4	
1966	Frank J. Biondolillo	Republican	19,833	15.84	3rd of 4	

== District 17 ==
Year	Party designee	Designee Party	# Votes	% Votes	Place	Notes
1964	Kieran O'Doherty	Conservative	9,491	5.00	3rd of 4	
1966	Jeffrey St. John	Conservative	7,796	8.20	3rd of 3	

== District 18 ==
Year	Party designee	Designee Party	# Votes	% Votes	Place	Notes
1964	George S. Schuyler	Conservative	637	0.57	4th of 4	
1966	Ryland E.D. Chase	Conservative	1,214	1.98	4th of 4	

== District 19 ==
Year	Party designee	Designee Party	# Votes	% Votes	Place	Notes
1964	Suzanne La Follette	Conservative	1,363	1.11	4th of 4	
1966	Henry Del Rosso	Republican	3,807	4.10	4th of 4	

== District 20 ==
Year	Party designee	Designee Party	# Votes	% Votes	Place	Notes
1964	John Comninel	Conservative	2,944	1.96	4th of 4	
1966	Carolyn S. Weller	Conservative	4,473	4.51	4th of 4	

== District 21 ==
Year	Party designee	Designee Party	# Votes	% Votes	Place	Notes
1964	Thomas E. Rockwell	Conservative	1,716	1.57	4th of 4	
1966	Didn't Endorse					

== District 22 ==
Year	Party designee	Designee Party	# Votes	% Votes	Place	Notes
1964	Joseph F. Joyce	Conservative	696	0.81	4th of 4	
1966	Didn't Endorse					

== District 23 ==
Year	Party designee	Designee Party	# Votes	% Votes	Place	Notes
1964	William Lee	Conservative	2,461	1.62	4th of 4	
1966	Walter A. Quinn. Jr.	Conservative	8,949	7.77	4th of 4	
1968	Alexander Sacks	Republican	13,310	11.01	4th of 4	
1970	Nora Kardian	Conservative	8,456	8.18	4th of 4	
1972	Peter A. Peyser	Republican	16,804	8.48	3rd of 4	
1974	Peter A. Peyser	Republican	15,942	11.43	3rd of 4	
1976	Bruce Faulkner Caputo	Republican	14,405	8.31	3rd of 4	
1978	Angelo Martinelli	Republican	10,384	8.68	3rd of 4	
1980	Andrew A. Albanese	Republican	11,905	7.81	3rd of 3	
1982	Didn't Endorse					
1984	Didn't Endorse					
1986	Didn't Endorse					
1988	Peter M. Bakal	Republican	6,550	2.79	3rd of 3	
1990	Michael R. McNulty	Democratic	14,747	8.06	3rd of 3	
1992	Geoffrey P. Grace	Conservative	8,011	3.65	4th of 5	
1994	Didn't Endorse					
1996	Didn't Endorse					
1998	David B. Vickers	Conservative	21,596	15.68	2nd of 3	
2000	David B. Vickers	Conservative	35,245	17.19	3rd of 5	
2002	John M. McHugh	Republican	14,640	11.74	2nd of 2	
2004	John M. McHugh	Republican	8,771	3.87	4th of 4	
2006	John M. McHugh	Republican	7,326	4.33	4th of 5	
2008	John M. McHugh	Republican	7,326	4.24	4th of 5	
2009 - SE	Doug Hoffman	Conservative	69,553	45.95	2nd of 5	
2010	Doug Hoffman	Conservative	10,507	6.07	3rd of 5	
2012	Tom Reed	Republican	14,273	5.38	3rd of 5	
