= 2004 United States House of Representatives elections in New York =

- November 2, 2004

All 29 New York seats to the United States House of Representatives
	Majority party	Minority party
Party	Democratic	Republican
Last election	19	10
Seats won	20	9
Seat change	▲1	▼1
- Results: Democratic hold Democratic gain Republican hold

The 2004 United States House of Representatives elections in New York took place on November 2, 2004. One seat changed parties; in the 27th district Democrat Brian Higgins was elected to replace Republican Jack Quinn.

== Overview ==
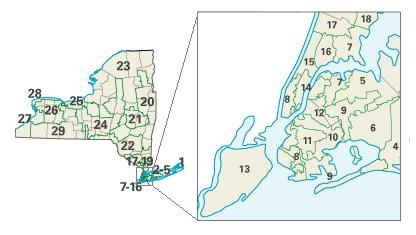
New York congressional districts

District	Incumbent	Party	Elected	Status	Opponent
12	Nydia Velázquez	Democrat	1992	Running	Nydia Velázquez (D) 86.3% Paul A. Rodriguez (R) 13.7%
13	Vito Fossella	Republican	1997	Running	Vito Fossella (R) 59.0% Frank Barbaro (D) 41.0%
14	Carolyn Maloney	Democrat	1992	Running	Carolyn Maloney (D) 81.1% Anton Srdanovic (R) 18.9%
15	Charles B. Rangel	Democrat	1970	Running	Charles B. Rangel (D) 91.1% Kenneth P. Jefferson, Jr. (R) 7.0% Jessie A. Fields (I) 1.9%
16	Jose Serrano	Democrat	1990	Running	Jose Serrano (D) 95.2% Ali Mohamed (R) 4.8%
17	Eliot Engel	Democrat	1988	Running	Eliot Engel (D) 76.1% Matthew I. Brennan (R) 22.0% Kevin Brawley (Conservative) 1.9%
18	Nita Lowey	Democrat	1988	Running	Nita Lowey (D) 69.8% Richard A. Hoffman (R) 30.2%
19	Sue Kelly	Republican	1994	Running	Sue Kelly (R) 66.7% Michael Jalamin (D) 33.3%
20	John Sweeney	Republican	1998	Running	John Sweeney (R) 65.8% Doris F. Kelly (D) 33.7% Morris N. Guller (I) 0.5%
21	Mike McNulty	Democrat	1988	Running	Mike McNulty (D) 70.8% Warren Redlich (R) 29.2%
22	Maurice Hinchey	Democrat	1992	Running	Maurice Hinchey (D) 67.2% William Brenner (R) 32.8%
23	John McHugh	Republican	1992	Running	John McHugh (R) 70.7% Robert J. Johnson (D) 29.3%
24	Sherwood Boehlert	Republican	1982	Running	Sherwood Boehlert (R) 56.9% Jeff Miller (D) 33.9% David L. Walrath (Conservative) 9.2%
25	Jim Walsh	Republican	1988	Running	Jim Walsh (R) 90.4% Howie Hawkins (PJP) 9.6%
26	Tom Reynolds	Republican	1998	Running	Tom Reynolds (R) 55.6% Jack Davis (D) 44.4%
27	Jack Quinn	Republican	1992	Retiring	Brian Higgins (D) 50.7% Nancy Naples (R) 49.3%
28	Louise Slaughter	Democrat	1986	Running	Louise Slaughter (D) 72.6% Mike Laba (R) 24.8% Francina J. Cartonia (I) 2.6%

== District 1 ==
2004 New York's 1st congressional district election
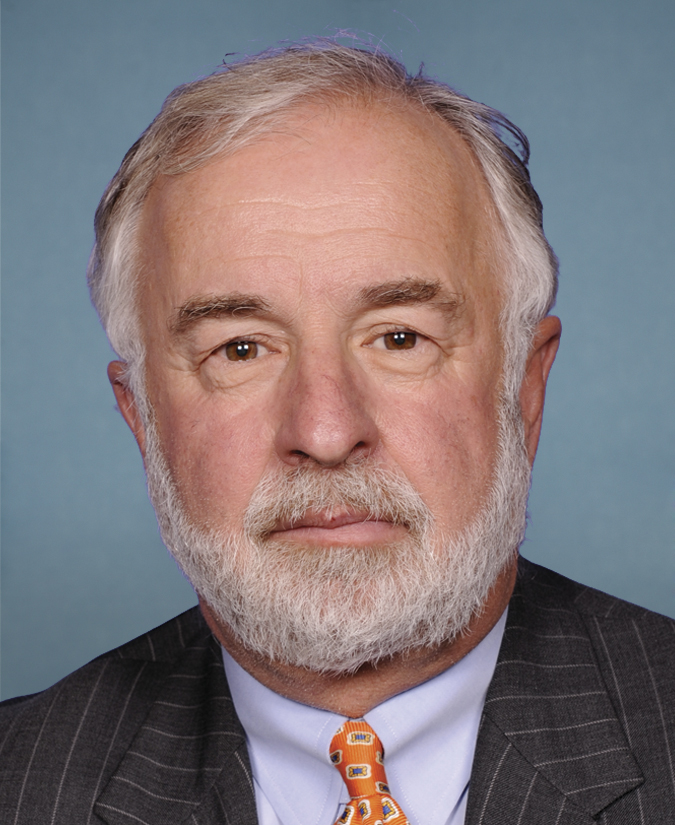

Nominee	Tim Bishop	William M. Manger Jr.
Party	Democratic	Republican
Popular vote	156,354	121,855
Percentage	56.2%	43.8%
- County results Bishop: 50–60%
U.S. Representative before election
Tim Bishop
Democratic
Elected U.S. Representative
Tim Bishop
Democratic

=== Candidates ===
- Tim Bishop, incumbent U.S. Representative
- William M. Manger Jr., former Southampton trustee

=== Endorsements ===
Tim Bishop

Newspapers and publications

- Newsday
William M. Manger Jr.

Local officials

- Rudy Giuliani, former Mayor of New York City

=== Predictions ===
Source	Ranking	As of
The Cook Political Report	Lean D	October 29, 2004
Sabato's Crystal Ball	Lean D	November 1, 2004

=== Results ===
2004 New York's 1st congressional district general election
Party	Candidate	Votes	%
Democratic	Tim Bishop	140,878	50.64
Independence	Tim Bishop	9,657	3.47
Working Families	Tim Bishop	5,819	2.09
Total	Tim Bishop (incumbent)	156,354	56.20
Republican	William M. Manger Jr.	110,786	39.82
Conservative	William M. Manger Jr.	11,069	3.98
Total	William M. Manger Jr.	121,855	43.80
Total votes		278,209	100.0
Democratic hold			

== District 2 ==
2004 New York's 2nd congressional district election
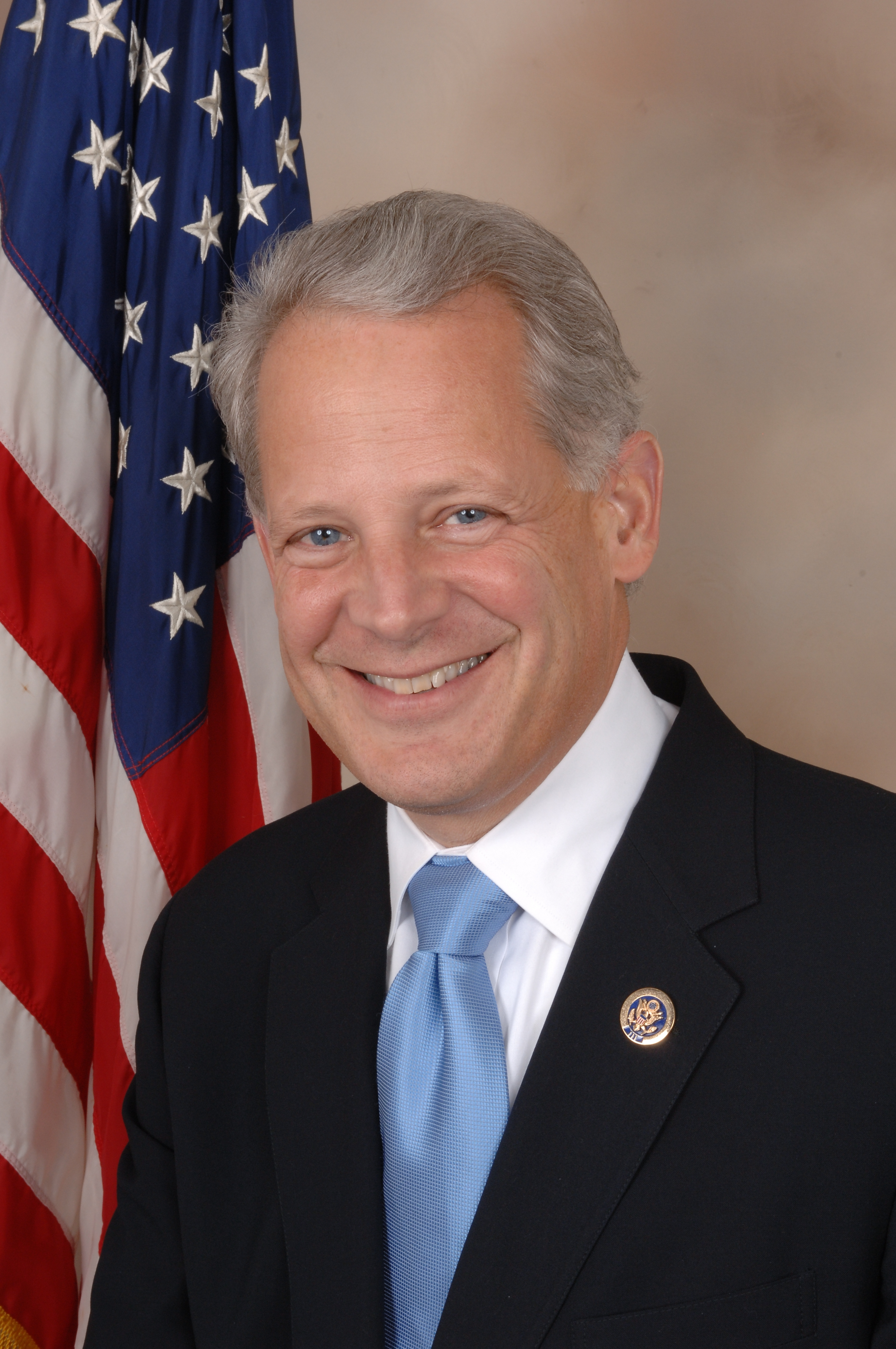

Nominee	Steve Israel	Richard Hoffmann
Party	Democratic	Republican
Popular vote	161,593	80,950
Percentage	66.6%	33.4%
- County results Israel: 60–70% 70–80%
U.S. Representative before election
Steve Israel
Democratic
Elected U.S. Representative
Steve Israel
Democratic

=== Candidates ===
- Steve Israel, incumbent U.S. Representative
- Richard Hoffman, Islip Deputy Attorney

=== Endorsements ===
Steve Israel

Newspapers and publications

- Newsday

=== Predictions ===
Source	Ranking	As of
The Cook Political Report	Safe D	October 29, 2004
Sabato's Crystal Ball	Safe D	November 1, 2004

=== Results ===
2004 New York's 2nd congressional district general election
Party	Candidate	Votes	%
Democratic	Steve Israel	140,878	60.69
Independence	Steve Israel	9,508	3.92
Working Families	Steve Israel	4,888	2.02
Total	Steve Israel (incumbent)	161,593	66.62
Republican	Richard Hoffmann	72,953	30.09
Conservative	Richard Hoffmann	7,997	3.29
Total	Richard Hoffmann	80,950	33.38
Total votes		242,543	100.0
Democratic hold			

== District 3 ==
2004 New York's 3rd congressional district election
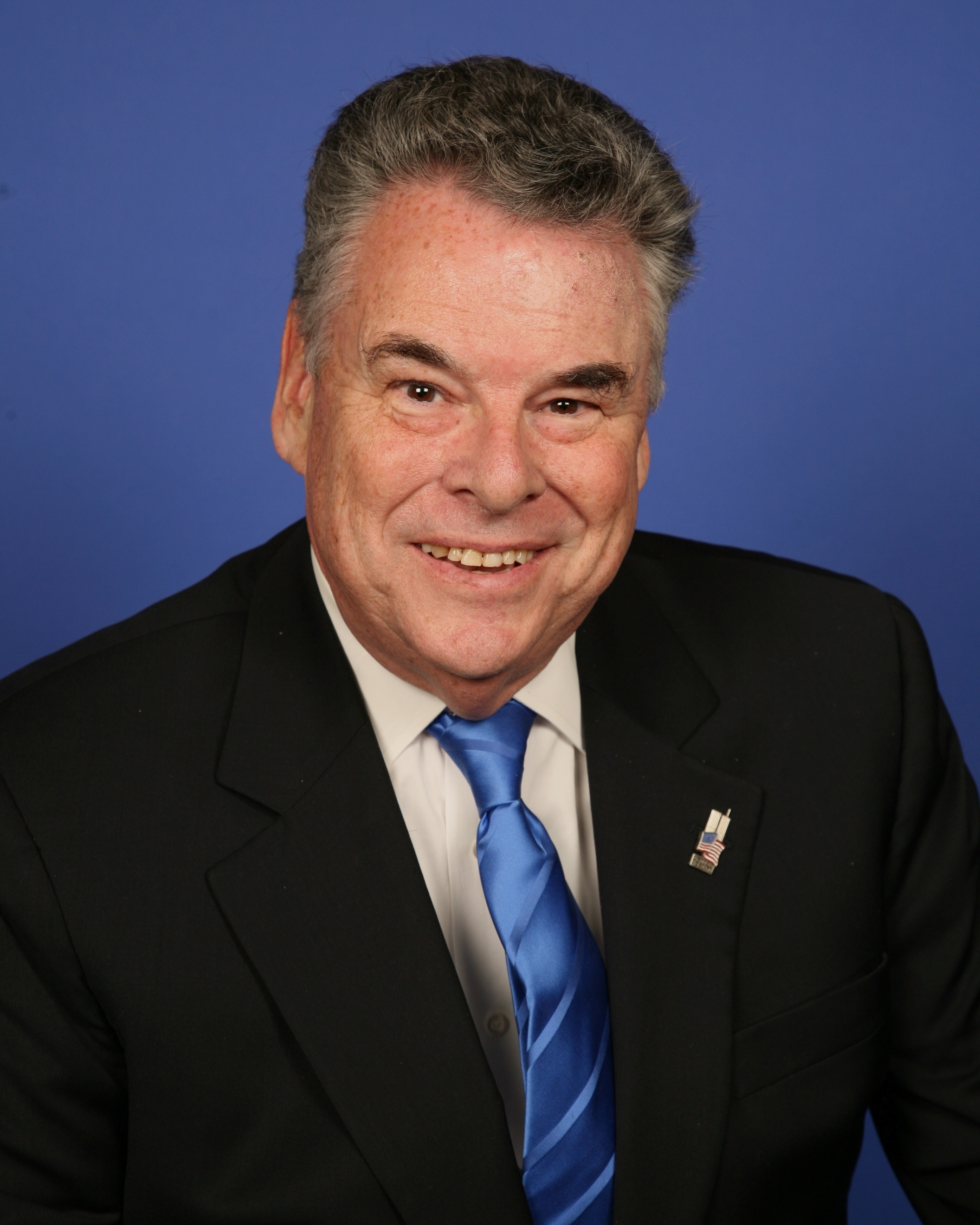

Nominee	Peter T. King	Blair Mathies
Party	Republican	Democratic
Popular vote	171,259	100,737
Percentage	63.0%	37.0%
- County results King: 60–70%
U.S. Representative before election
Peter T. King
Republican
Elected U.S. Representative
Peter T. King
Republican

=== Candidates ===
- Peter T. King, incumbent U.S. Representative
- Blair Mathies, attorney

=== Predictions ===
Source	Ranking	As of
The Cook Political Report	Safe R	October 29, 2004
Sabato's Crystal Ball	Safe R	November 1, 2004

=== Results ===
2004 New York's 3rd congressional district general election
Party	Candidate	Votes	%
Republican	Peter T. King	151,323	55.63
Conservative	Peter T. King	12,022	4.41
Independence	Peter T. King	7,914	2.91
Total	Peter T. King (incumbent)	171,259	62.96
Democratic	Blair Mathies	100,737	37.03
Total votes		271,996	100.0
Republican hold			

== District 4 ==
2004 New York's 4th congressional district election
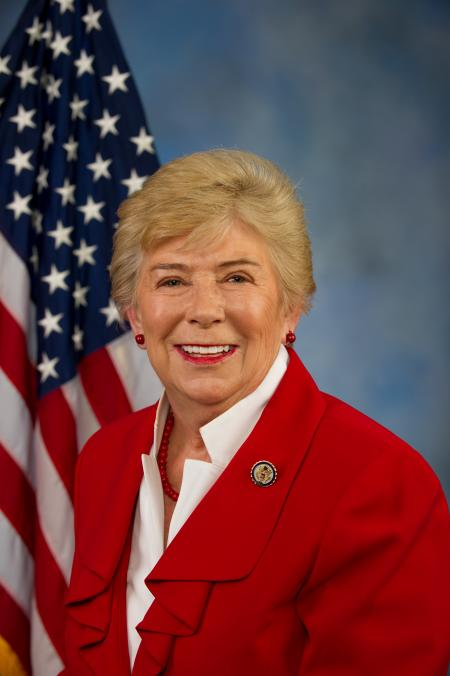

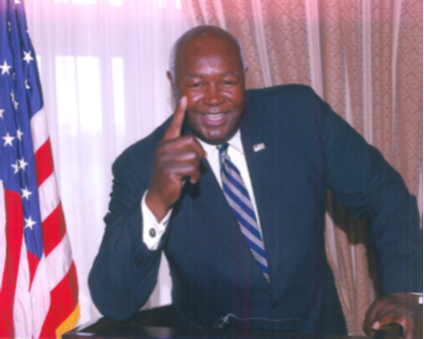
Nominee	Carolyn McCarthy	James Garner
Party	Democratic	Republican
Popular vote	159,969	94,141
Percentage	63.0%	37.0%
- County results Mccarthy: 60–70%
U.S. Representative before election
Carolyn McCarthy
Democratic
Elected U.S. Representative
Carolyn McCarthy
Democratic

=== Candidates ===
- Carolyn McCarthy (Democratic), incumbent U.S. Representative
- James Garner (Republican), Mayor of Hempstead Village
Candidates (Note: The images in this gallery are in the public domain or are otherwise free to use. This gallery should not be construed as a list of major or noteworthy candidates. If a candidate is not included in this gallery, it is only because there are no , copyright-free photographs of them available on the Internet.)
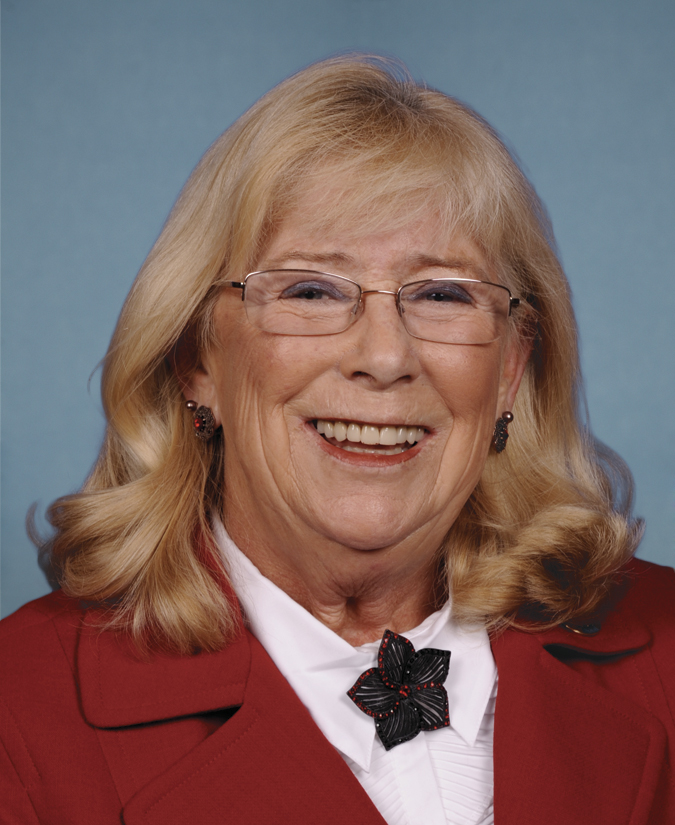
U.S. Representative
Carolyn McCarthy
from Mineola

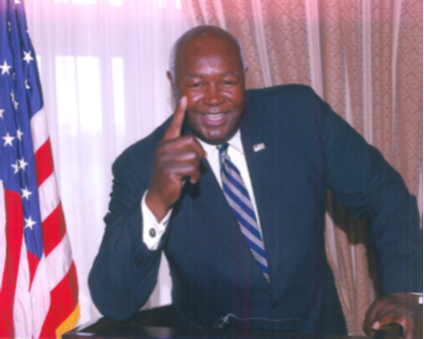
Mayor
James Garner
of Hempstead Village

=== Endorsements ===
James Garner

Federal officials

- Dennis Hastert, Speaker of the United States House of Representatives

=== Predictions ===
Source	Ranking	As of
The Cook Political Report	Safe D	October 29, 2004
Sabato's Crystal Ball	Safe D	November 1, 2004

=== Results ===
2004 New York's 4th congressional district general election
Party	Candidate	Votes	%
Democratic	Carolyn McCarthy	148,615	58.48
Independence	Carolyn McCarthy	6,951	2.73
Working Families	Carolyn McCarthy	4,403	1.73
Total	Carolyn McCarthy (incumbent)	159,969	62.95
Republican	James Garner	85,505	33.65
Conservative	James Garner	8,636	3.40
Total	James Garner	94,141	37.05
Total votes		254,110	100.0
Democratic hold			

== District 5 ==
2004 New York's 5th congressional district election
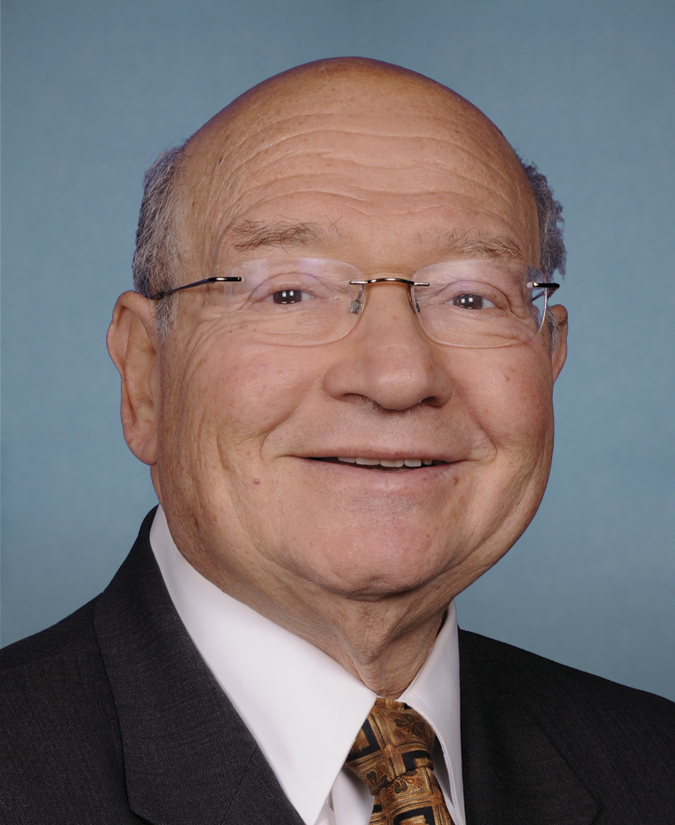

Nominee	Gary Ackerman	Stephen Graves
Party	Democratic	Republican
Popular vote	119,726	46,867
Percentage	71.3%	27.9%
- County results Ackerman: 60–70% 70–80%
U.S. Representative before election
Gary Ackerman
Democratic
Elected U.S. Representative
Gary Ackerman
Democratic

=== Candidates ===
- Gary Ackerman, incumbent U.S. Representative
- Stephen Graves, businessman
- Gonzalo Policarpio, retired immigration inspector

=== Predictions ===
Source	Ranking	As of
The Cook Political Report	Safe D	October 29, 2004
Sabato's Crystal Ball	Safe D	November 1, 2004

=== Results ===
2004 New York's 5th congressional district general election
Party	Candidate	Votes	%
Democratic	Gary Ackerman	114,132	68.00
Independence	Gary Ackerman	2,901	1.73
Working Families	Gary Ackerman	2,693	1.60
Total	Gary Ackerman (incumbent)	119,726	71.33
Republican	Stephen Graves	43,002	25.62
Conservative	Stephen Graves	8,636	2.30
Total	Stephen Graves	46,867	27.92
Fair Immigration	Gonzalo Policarpio	1,248	0.74
Total votes		167,841	100.0
Democratic hold			

== District 6 ==
2004 New York's 6th congressional district election
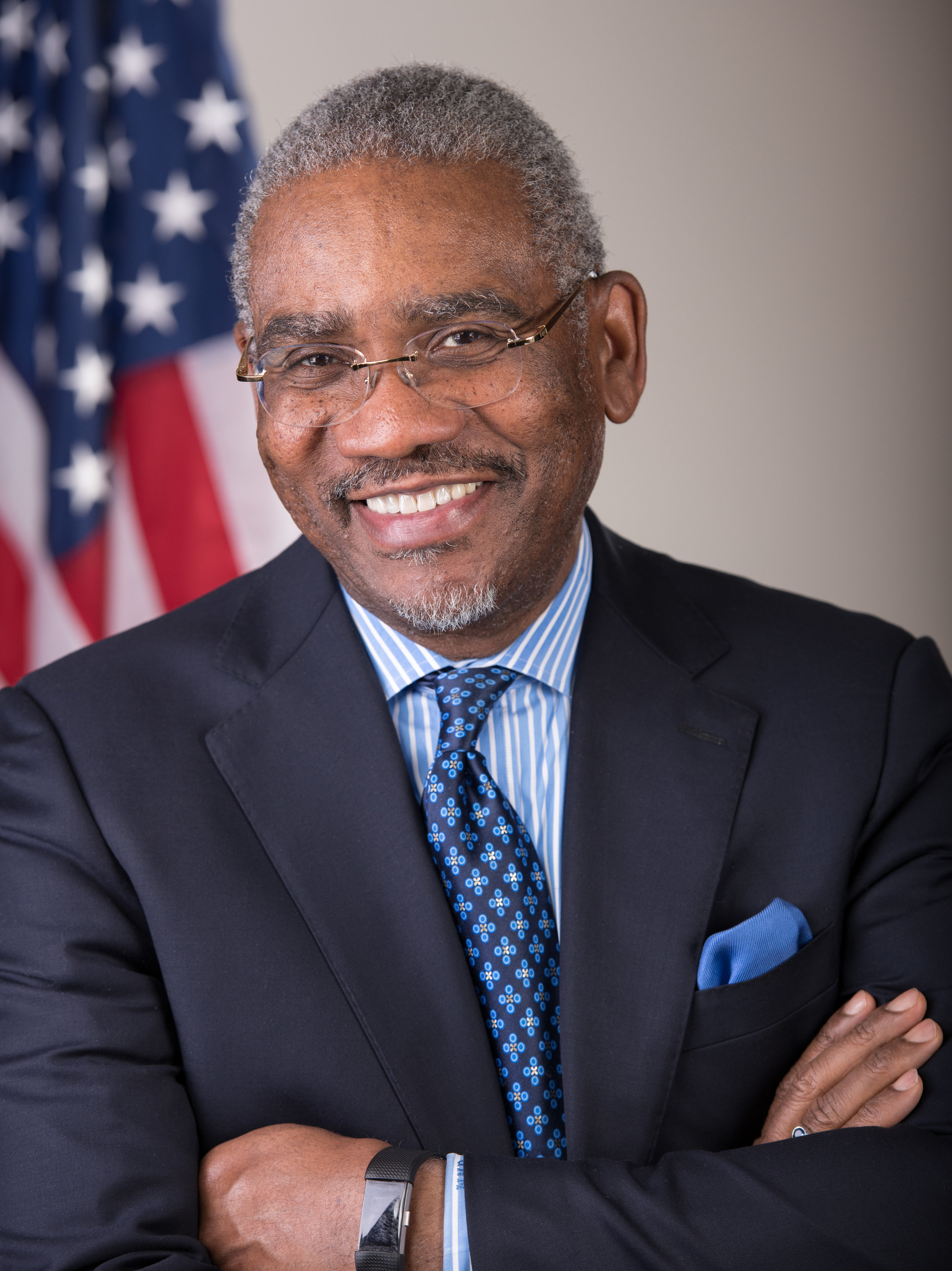
Nominee	Greg Meeks
Party	Democratic
Popular vote	129,688
Percentage	100.0%
U.S. Representative before election
Greg Meeks
Democratic
Elected U.S. Representative
Greg Meeks
Democratic

=== Candidates ===
- Greg Meeks (Democratic), incumbent U.S. Representative

=== Predictions ===
Source	Ranking	As of
The Cook Political Report	Safe D	October 29, 2004
Sabato's Crystal Ball	Safe D	November 1, 2004

=== Results ===
2004 New York's 6th congressional district general election
Party	Candidate	Votes	%
Democratic	Greg Meeks	125,127	96.48
Working Families	Greg Meeks	4,561	3.52
Total	Greg Meeks (incumbent)	129,688	100.00
Total votes		129,688	100.0
Democratic hold			

== District 7 ==
2004 New York's 7th congressional district election
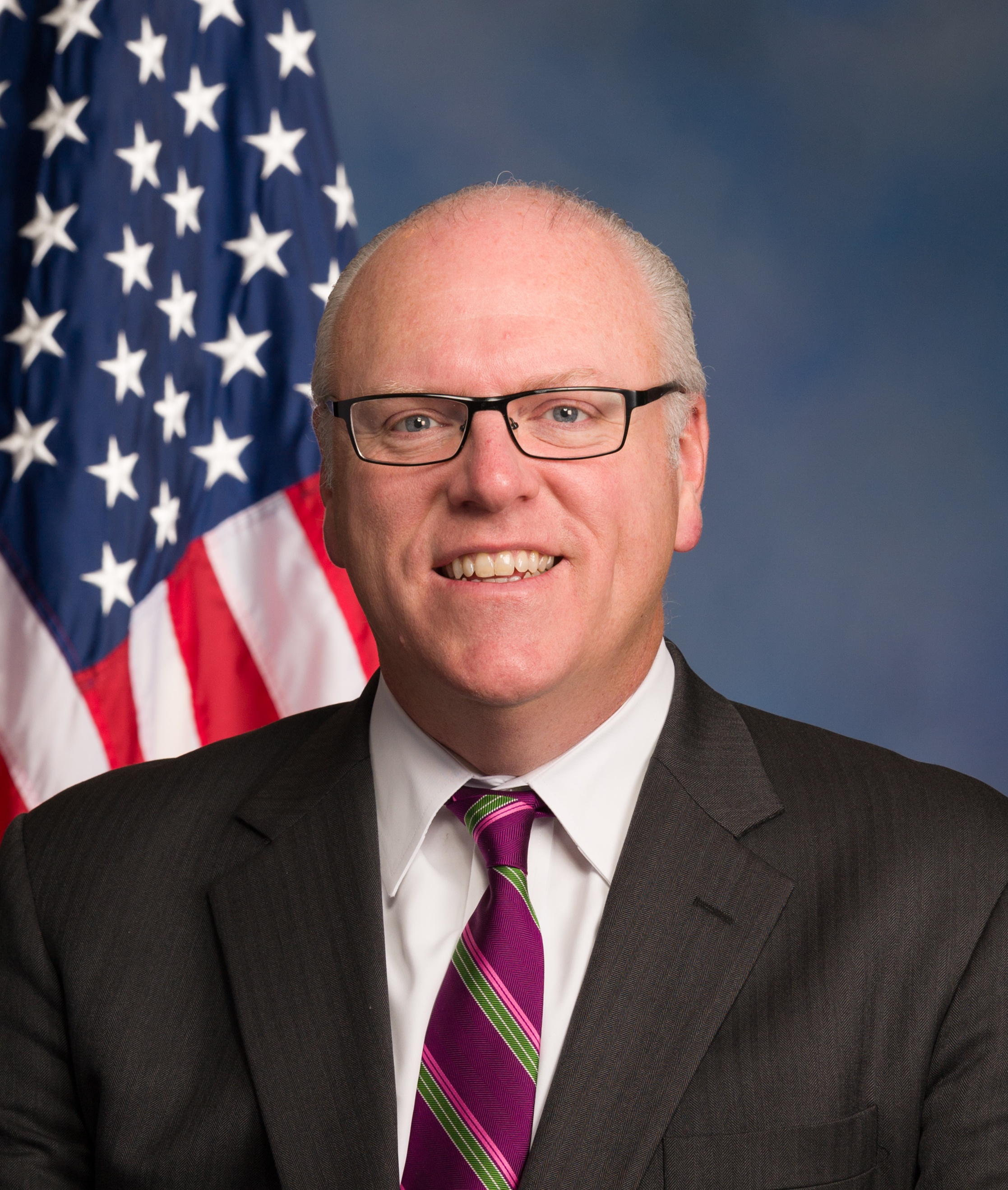

Nominee	Joe Crowley	Joseph Cinquemani
Party	Democratic	Republican
Popular vote	104,275	24,548
Percentage	80.9%	19.1%
- County results Crowley: 70–80% 80–90%
U.S. Representative before election
Joe Crowley
Democratic
Elected U.S. Representative
Joe Crowley
Democratic

=== Candidates ===
- Joe Crowley, incumbent U.S. Representative
- Joseph Cinquemani, attorney

=== Predictions ===
Source	Ranking	As of
The Cook Political Report	Safe D	October 29, 2004
Sabato's Crystal Ball	Safe D	November 1, 2004

=== Results ===
2004 New York's 7th congressional district general election
Party	Candidate	Votes	%
Democratic	Joe Crowley	100,382	77.92
Working Families	Joe Crowley	3,893	3.02
Total	Joe Crowley (incumbent)	104,275	80.94
Republican	Joseph Cinquemani	21,843	16.96
Conservative	Joseph Cinquemani	2,705	2.10
Total	Joseph Cinquemani	24,548	19.06
Total votes		167,841	100.0
Democratic hold			

== District 8 ==
2004 New York's 8th congressional district election
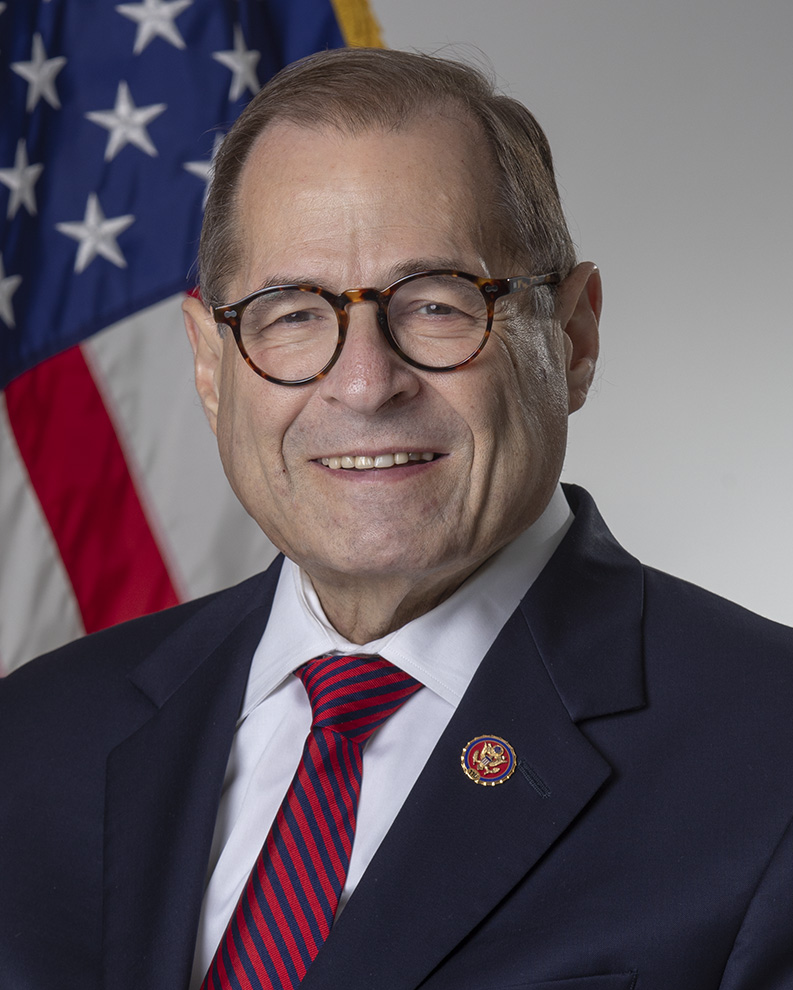

Nominee	Jerry Nadler	Peter Hort
Party	Democratic	Republican
Popular vote	162,082	39,240
Percentage	82.2%	19.9%
U.S. Representative before election
Jerry Nadler
Democratic
Elected U.S. Representative
Jerry Nadler
Democratic

=== Candidates ===
- Jerry Nadler, incumbent U.S. Representative
- Peter Hort, non-profit executive

=== Predictions ===
Source	Ranking	As of
The Cook Political Report	Safe D	October 29, 2004
Sabato's Crystal Ball	Safe D	November 1, 2004

=== Results ===
2004 New York's 8th congressional district general election
Party	Candidate	Votes	%
Democratic	Jerry Nadler	100,382	78.12
Working Families	Jerry Nadler	7,984	4.05
Total	Jerry Nadler (incumbent)	162,082	82.18
Republican	Peter Hort	35,177	16.96
Independence	Peter Hort	2,421	1.23
Conservative	Peter Hort	1,642	0.83
Total	Peter Hort	39,240	19.89
Total votes		197,259	100.0
Democratic hold			

== District 9 ==
2004 New York's 9th congressional district election
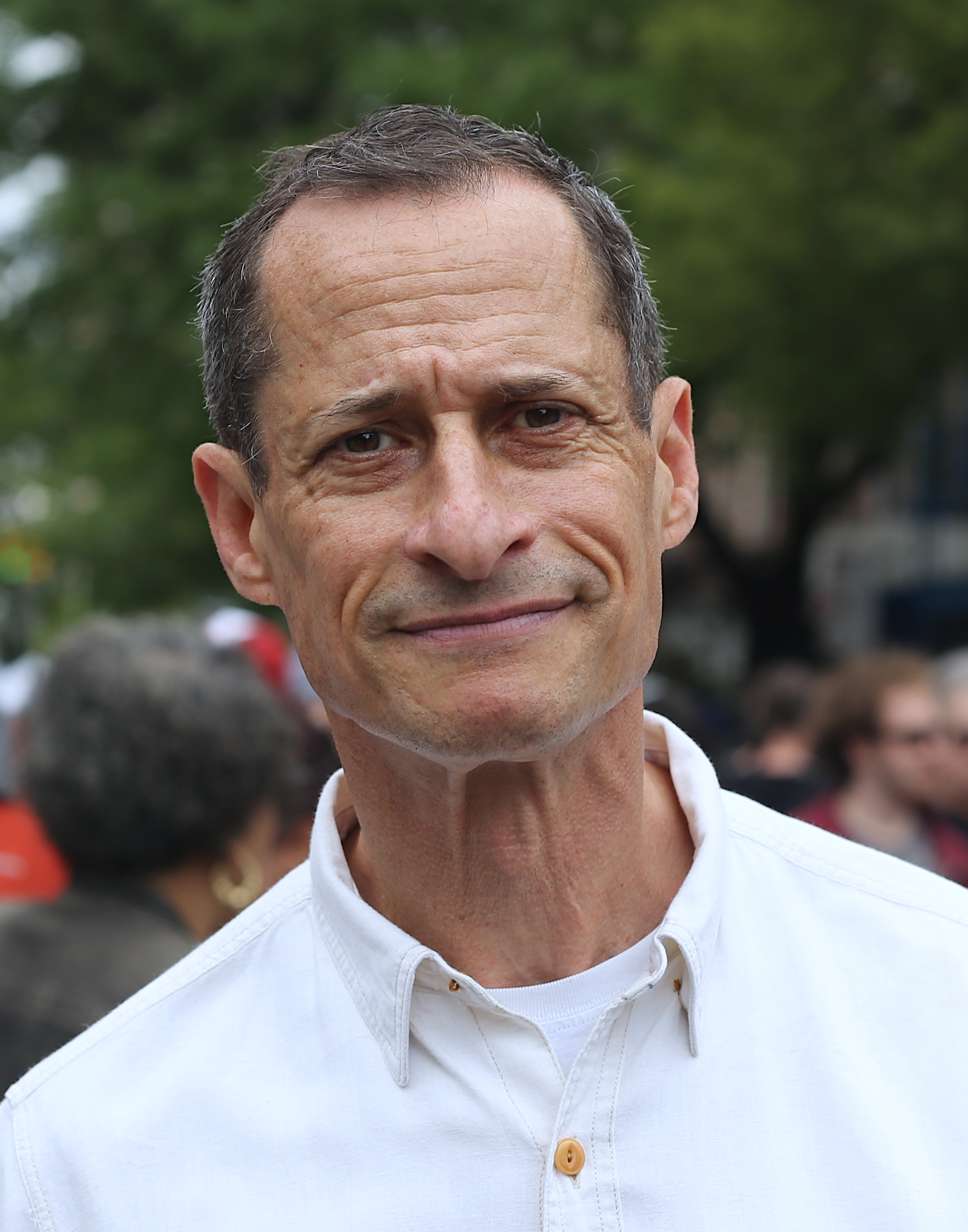

Nominee	Anthony Weiner	Gerard Cronin
Party	Democratic	Republican
Popular vote	113,025	45,451
Percentage	71.3%	28.7%
- County results Weiner: 60–70% 70–80%
U.S. Representative before election
Anthony Weiner
Democratic
Elected U.S. Representative
Anthony Weiner
Democratic

=== Candidates ===
- Anthony Weiner (Democratic), incumbent U.S. Representative
- Gerard Cronin (Republican), educator and candidate for Governor of New York in 2002

=== Predictions ===
Source	Ranking	As of
The Cook Political Report	Safe D	October 29, 2004
Sabato's Crystal Ball	Safe D	November 1, 2004

=== Results ===
2004 New York's 9th congressional district general election
Party	Candidate	Votes	%
Democratic	Anthony Weiner	108,577	68.52
Working Families	Anthony Weiner	4,448	2.81
Total	Anthony Weiner (incumbent)	113,025	71.32
Republican	Gerard Cronin	39,648	25.02
Conservative	Gerard Cronin	4,141	2.61
Independence	Gerard Cronin	1,622	1.02
Total	Gerard Cronin	45,451	28.68
Total votes		158,467	100.0
Democratic hold			

== District 10 ==
2004 New York's 10th congressional district election
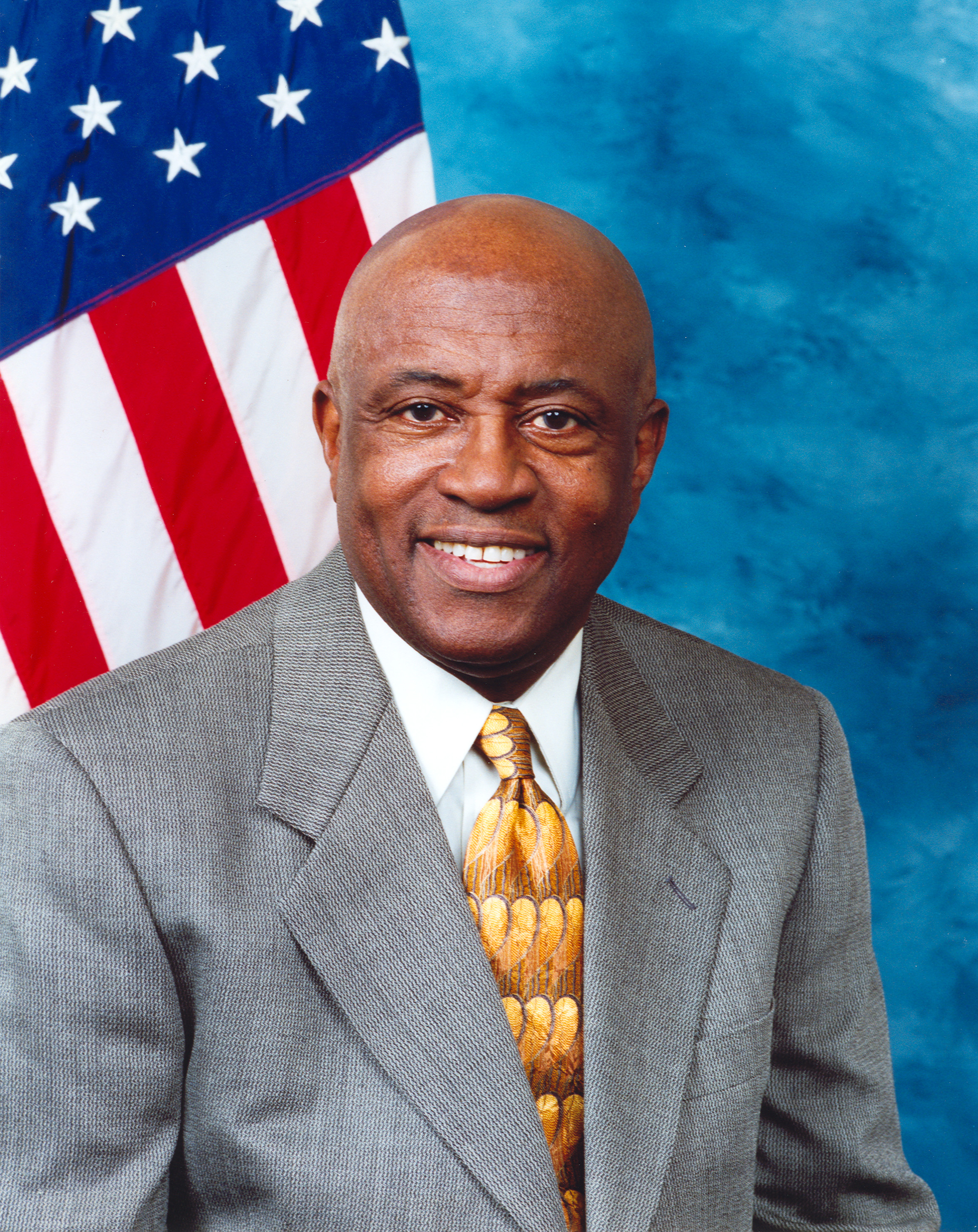

Nominee	Edolphus Towns	Harvey R. Clarke
Party	Democratic	Republican
Popular vote	136,113	11,099
Percentage	91.5%	7.5%
U.S. Representative before election
Edolphus Towns
Democratic
Elected U.S. Representative
Edolphus Towns
Democratic

=== Candidates ===
- Edolphus Towns (Democratic), incumbent U.S. Representative
- Harvey R. Clarke (Republican), adjunct professor of Political Science at Pace University
- Mariana Blume (Conservative), activist and former model

=== Predictions ===
Source	Ranking	As of
The Cook Political Report	Safe D	October 29, 2004
Sabato's Crystal Ball	Safe D	November 1, 2004

=== Results ===
2004 New York's 10th congressional district general election
Party	Candidate	Votes	%
Democratic	Edolphus Towns	130,265	87.57
Working Families	Edolphus Towns	5,848	3.93
Total	Edolphus Towns (incumbent)	136,113	91.50
Republican	Harvey R. Clarke	11,099	7.46
Conservative	Mariana Blume	1,554	1.04
Total votes		148,756	100.0
Democratic hold			

== District 11 ==
2004 New York's 11th congressional district election
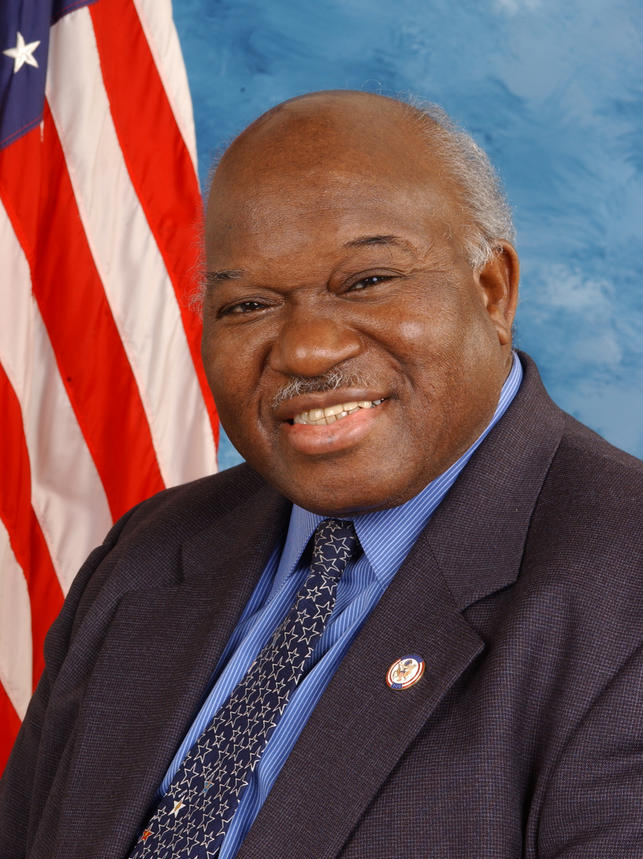

Nominee	Major Owens	Lorraine Stevens
Party	Democratic	Independence
Popular vote	144,999	4,721
Percentage	94.0%	3.1%
- County results Owens: 90–100%
U.S. Representative before election
Major Owens
Democratic
Elected U.S. Representative
Major Owens
Democratic

=== Candidates ===
- Major Owens (Democratic), incumbent U.S. Representative
- Lorraine Stevens (Independence), counselor and perennial candidate
- Sol Lieberman (Conservative), attorney

=== Predictions ===
Source	Ranking	As of
The Cook Political Report	Safe D	October 29, 2004
Sabato's Crystal Ball	Safe D	November 1, 2004

=== Results ===
2004 New York's 11th congressional district general election
Party	Candidate	Votes	%
Democratic	Major Owens	134,175	87.01
Working Families	Major Owens	10,824	7.02
Total	Major Owens (incumbent)	144,999	94.03
Independence	Lorraine Stevens	4,721	3.06
Conservative	Sol Lieberman	4,478	2.90
Total votes		154,198	100.0
Democratic hold			

== District 12 ==
2004 New York's 12th congressional district election
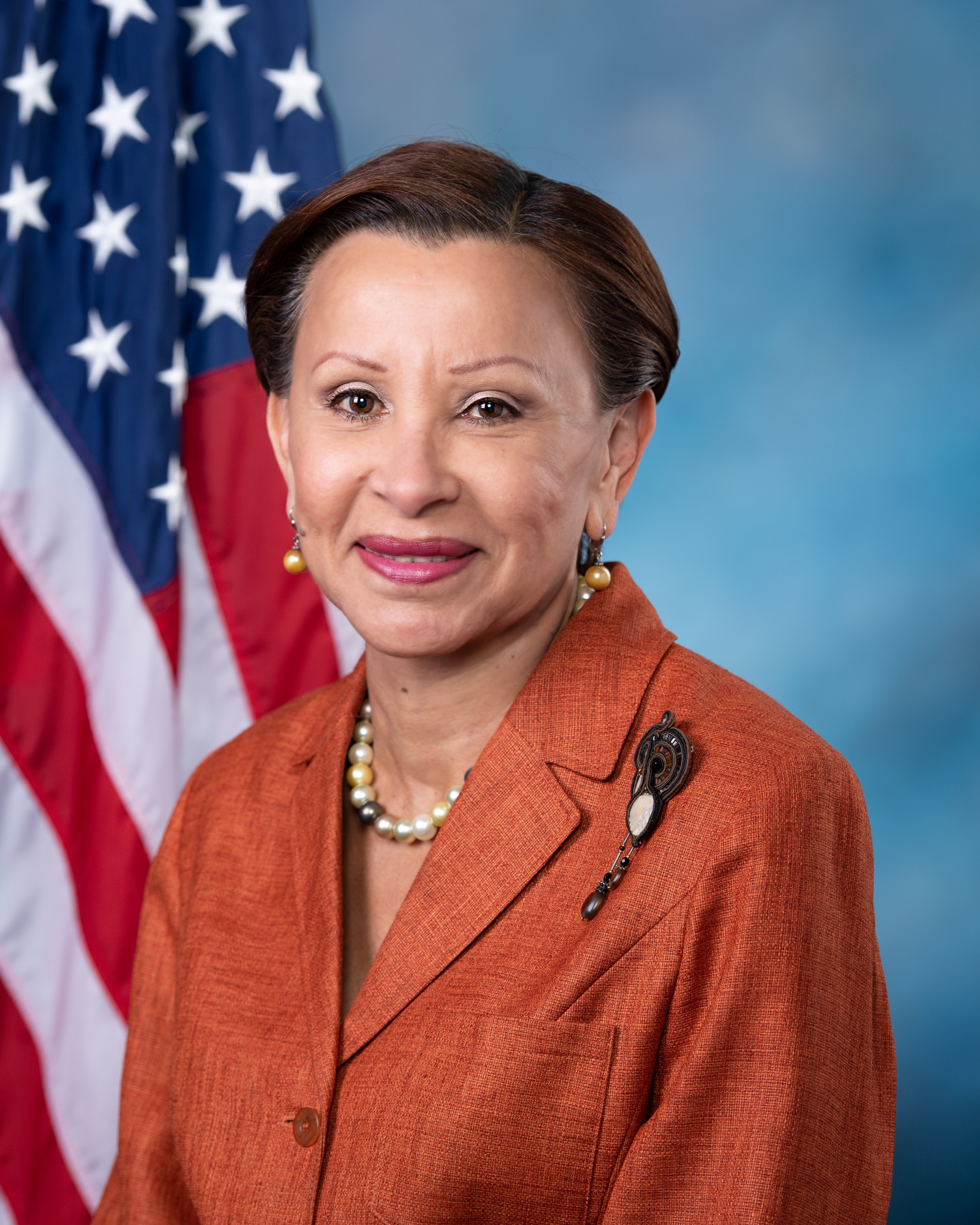

Nominee	Nydia Velázquez	Paul A. Rodriguez
Party	Democratic	Republican
Percentage	86.3%	13.7%
- County results Velazquez: 70–80% 80–90%
U.S. Representative before election
Nydia Velázquez
Democratic
Elected U.S. Representative
Nydia Velázquez
Democratic

=== Predictions ===
Source	Ranking	As of
The Cook Political Report	Safe D	October 29, 2004
Sabato's Crystal Ball	Safe D	November 1, 2004

== District 13 ==
2004 New York's 13th congressional district election
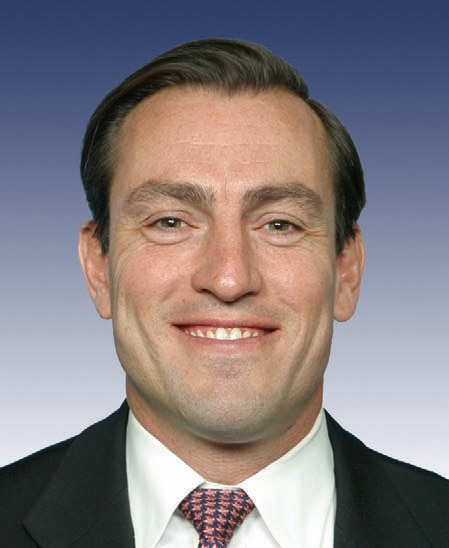

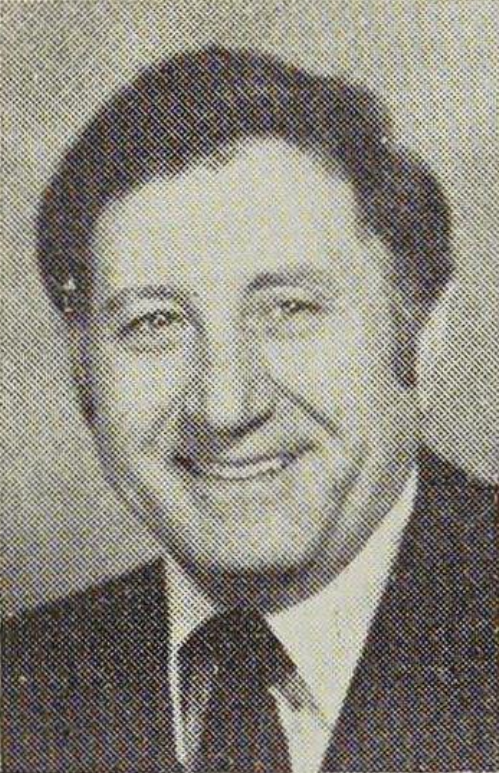
Nominee	Vito Fossella	Frank Barbaro
Party	Republican	Democratic
Percentage	59.0%	41.0%
- County results Fossella: 60–70% Barbaro: 50–60%
U.S. Representative before election
Vito Fossella
Republican
Elected U.S. Representative
Vito Fossella
Republican

=== Predictions ===
Source	Ranking	As of
The Cook Political Report	Safe R	October 29, 2004
Sabato's Crystal Ball	Safe R	November 1, 2004

== District 14 ==
2004 New York's 14th congressional district election
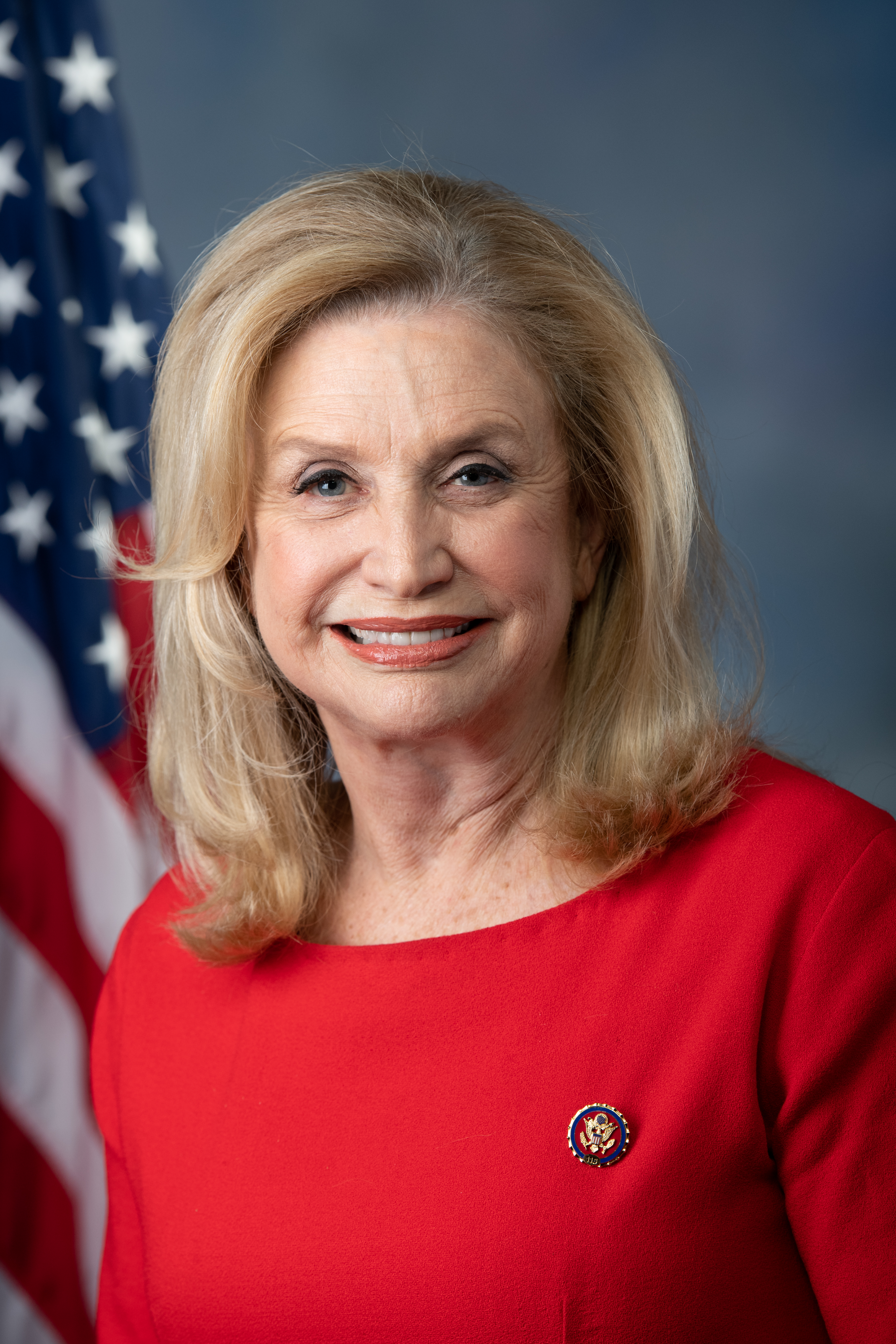

Nominee	Carolyn Maloney	Anton Srdanovic
Party	Democratic	Republican
Percentage	81.1%	18.9%
- County results Maloney: 80–90%
U.S. Representative before election
Carolyn Maloney
Democratic
Elected U.S. Representative
Carolyn Maloney
Democratic

=== Predictions ===
Source	Ranking	As of
The Cook Political Report	Safe D	October 29, 2004
Sabato's Crystal Ball	Safe D	November 1, 2004

== District 15 ==
2004 New York's 15th congressional district election
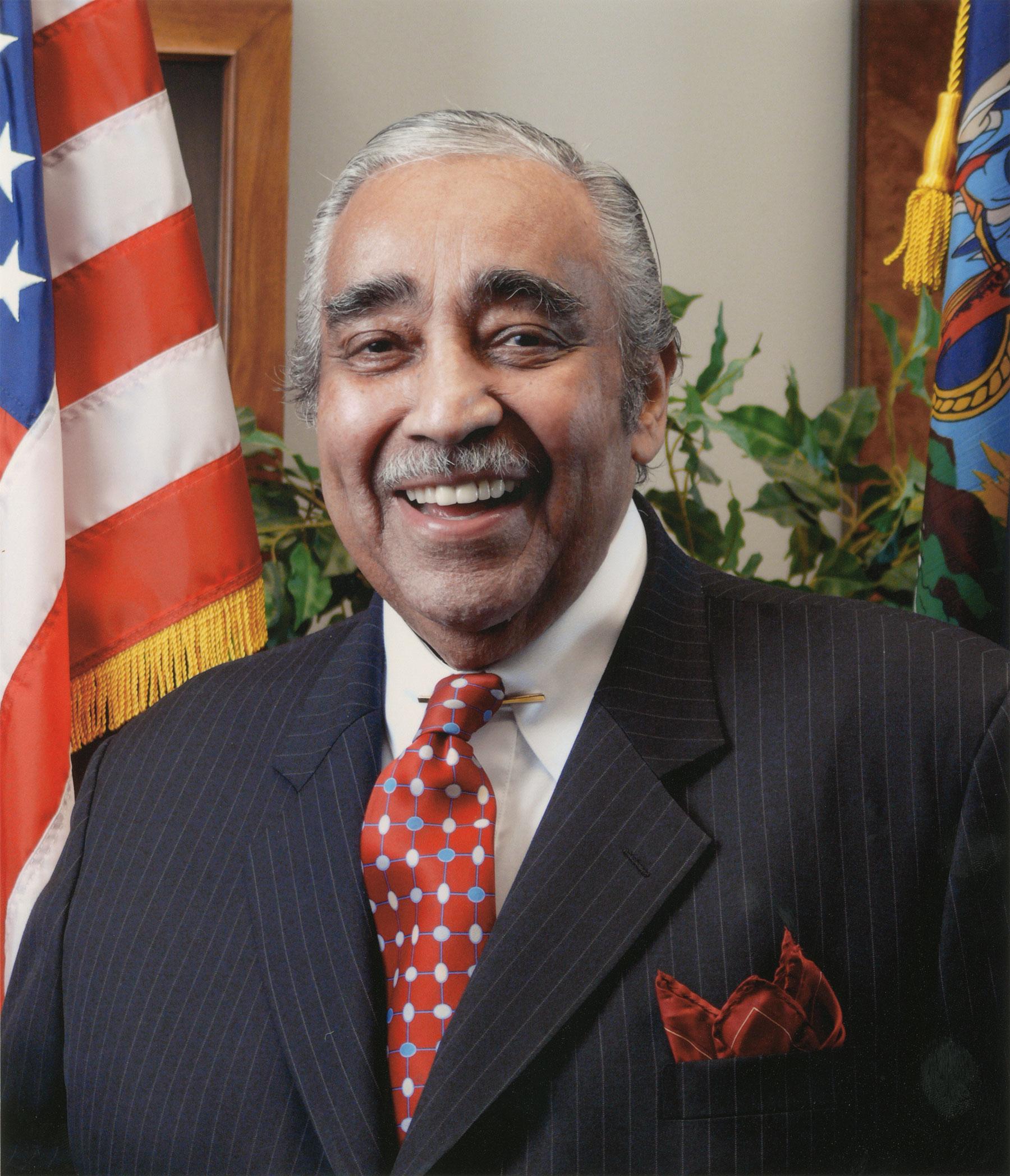

Nominee	Charles B. Rangel	Kenneth P. Jefferson, Jr.
Party	Democratic	Republican
Percentage	91.1%	7.0%
U.S. Representative before election
Charles B. Rangel
Democratic
Elected U.S. Representative
Charles B. Rangel
Democratic

=== Predictions ===
Source	Ranking	As of
The Cook Political Report	Safe D	October 29, 2004
Sabato's Crystal Ball	Safe D	November 1, 2004

== District 16 ==
2004 New York's 16th congressional district election
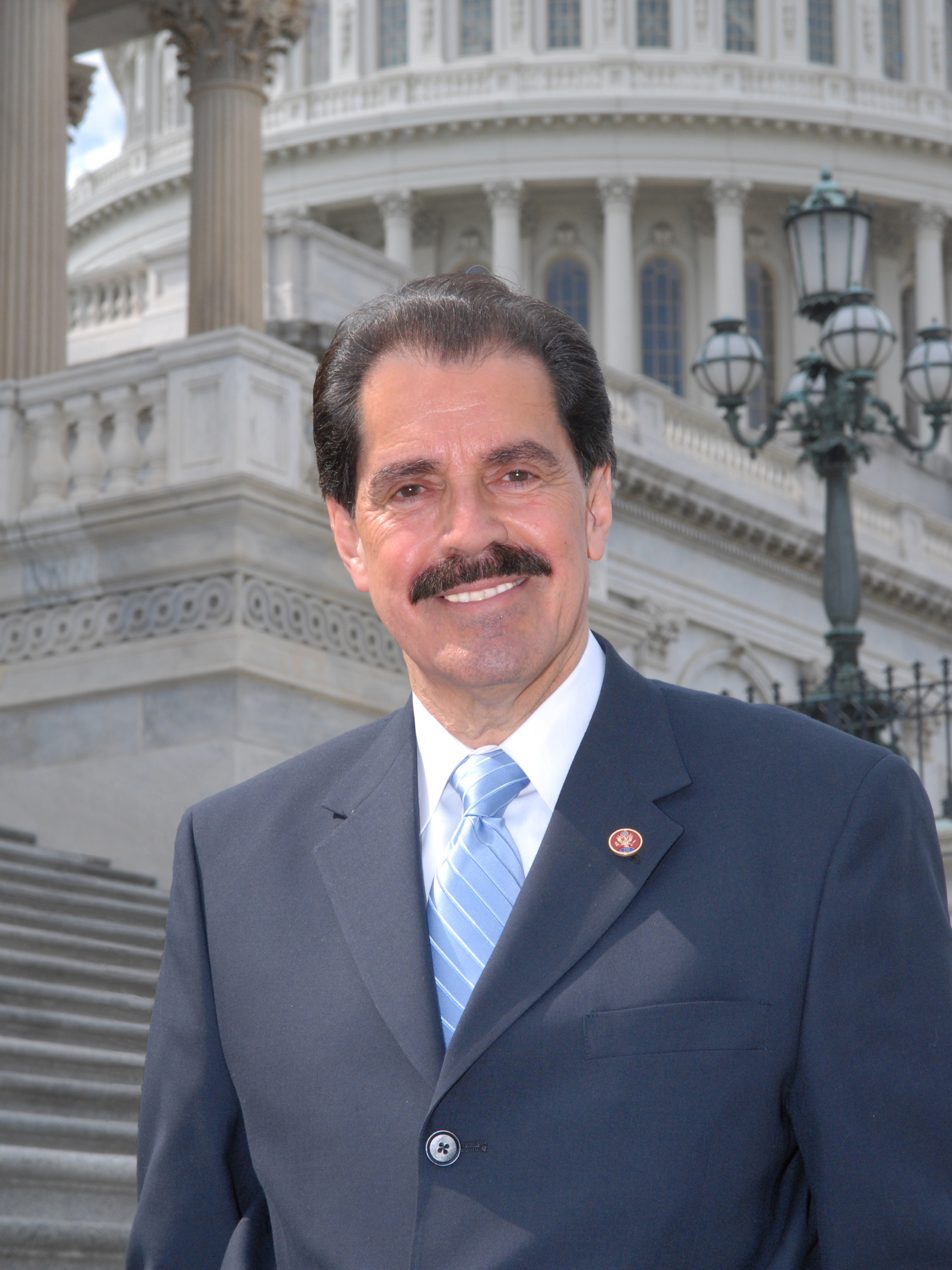

Nominee	Jose Serrano	Ali Mohamed
Party	Democratic	Republican
Percentage	95.2%	4.8%
- County results Serrano: 90–100%
U.S. Representative before election
Jose Serrano
Democratic
Elected U.S. Representative
Jose Serrano
Democratic

=== Predictions ===
Source	Ranking	As of
The Cook Political Report	Safe D	October 29, 2004
Sabato's Crystal Ball	Safe D	November 1, 2004

== District 17 ==
2004 New York's 17th congressional district election
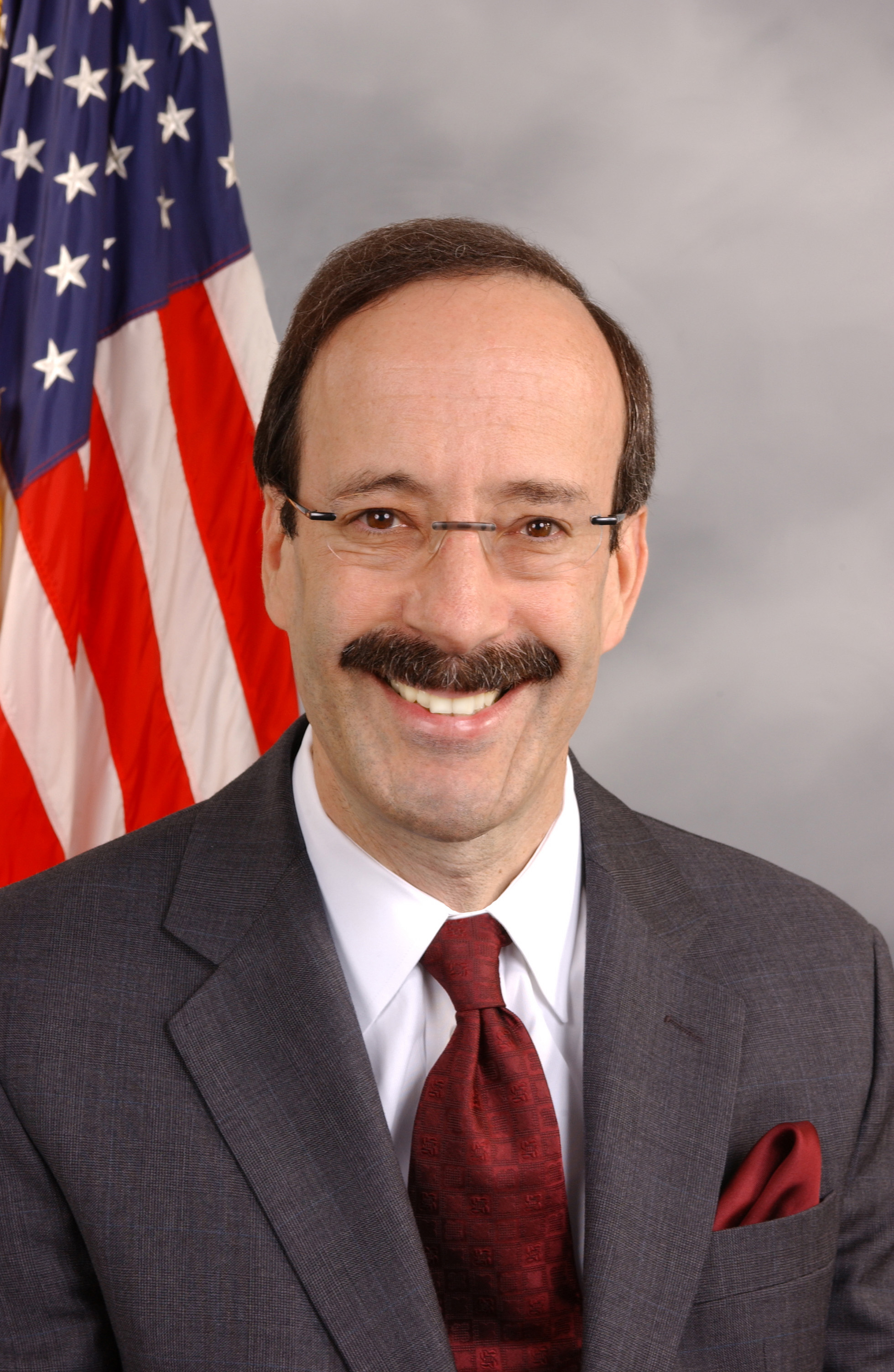

Nominee	Eliot Engel	Matthew I. Brennan
Party	Democratic	Republican
Percentage	76.1%	22.0%
- County results Engel: 60–70% 70–80% 80–90%
U.S. Representative before election
Eliot Engel
Democratic
Elected U.S. Representative
Eliot Engel
Democratic

=== Predictions ===
Source	Ranking	As of
The Cook Political Report	Safe D	October 29, 2004
Sabato's Crystal Ball	Safe D	November 1, 2004

== District 18 ==
2004 New York's 18th congressional district election
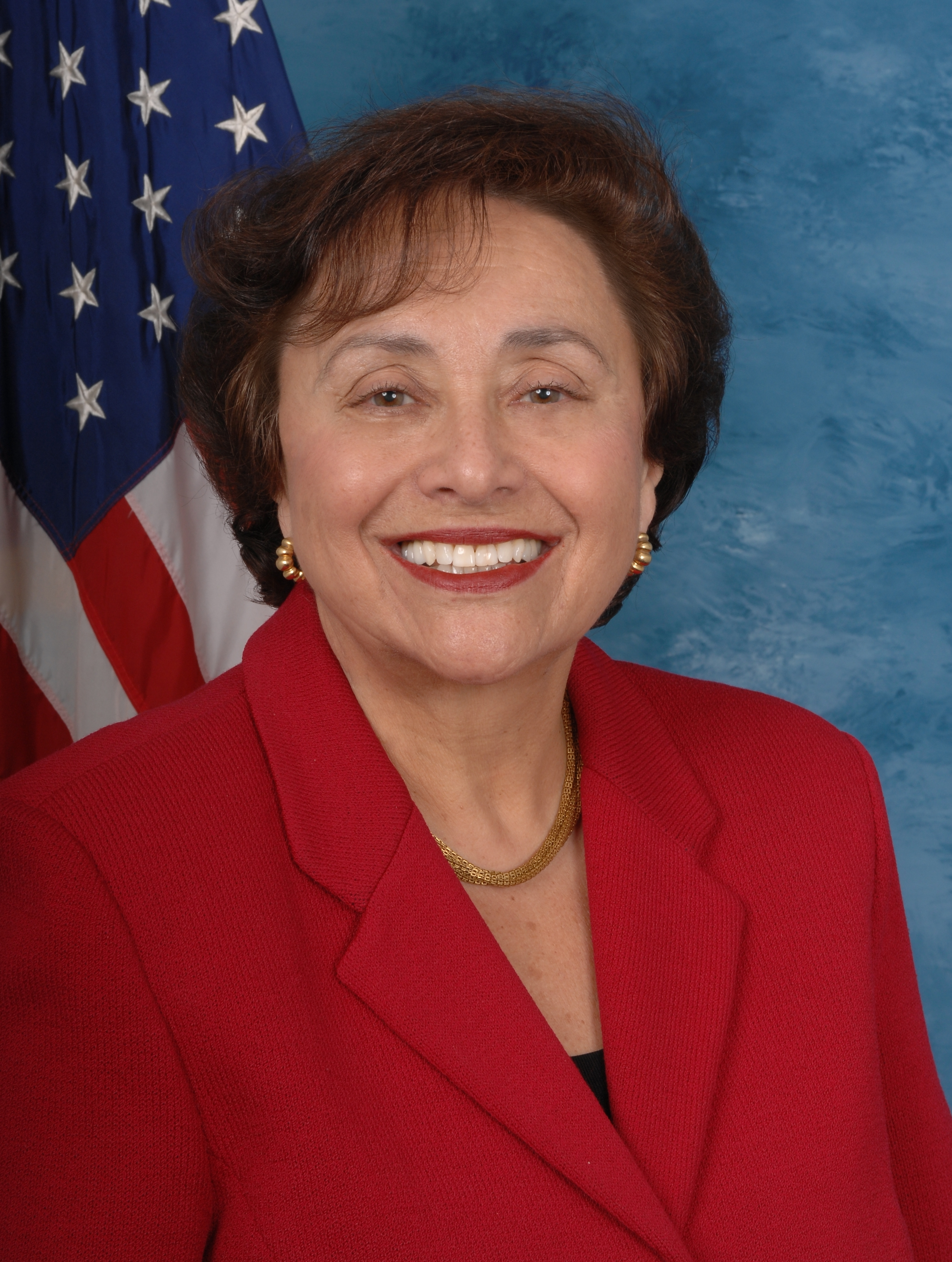

Nominee	Nita Lowey	Richard A. Hoffman
Party	Democratic	Republican
Percentage	69.8%	30.2%
- County results Lowey: 60–70% 70–80%
U.S. Representative before election
Nita Lowey
Democratic
Elected U.S. Representative
Nita Lowey
Democratic

=== Predictions ===
Source	Ranking	As of
The Cook Political Report	Safe D	October 29, 2004
Sabato's Crystal Ball	Safe D	November 1, 2004

== District 19 ==
2004 New York's 19th congressional district election
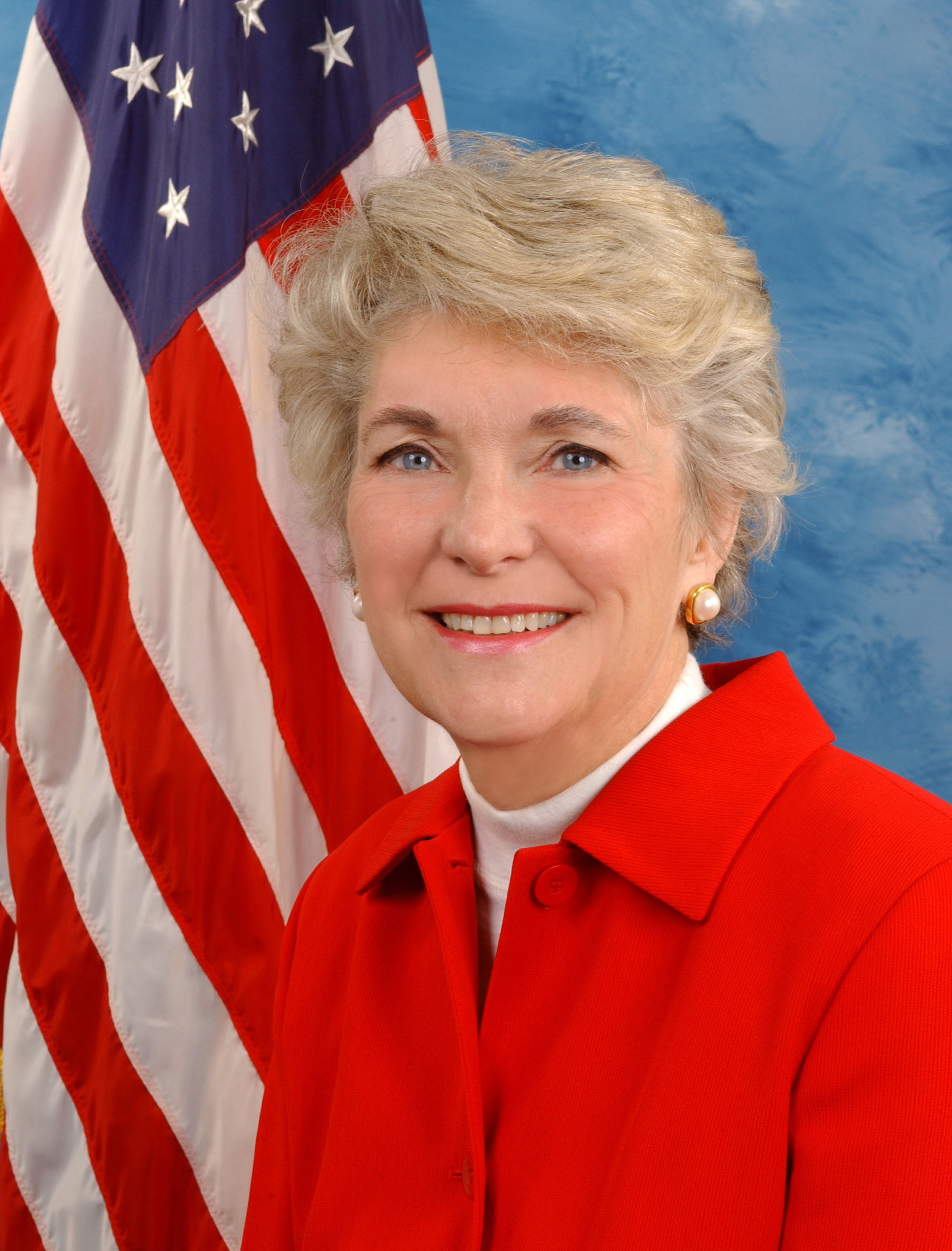

Nominee	Sue Kelly	Michael Jalamin
Party	Republican	Democratic
Percentage	66.7%	33.3%
- County results Kelly: 60–70% 70–80%
U.S. Representative before election
Sue Kelly
Republican
Elected U.S. Representative
Sue Kelly
Republican

=== Predictions ===
Source	Ranking	As of
The Cook Political Report	Safe R	October 29, 2004
Sabato's Crystal Ball	Safe R	November 1, 2004

== District 20 ==
2004 New York's 20th congressional district election
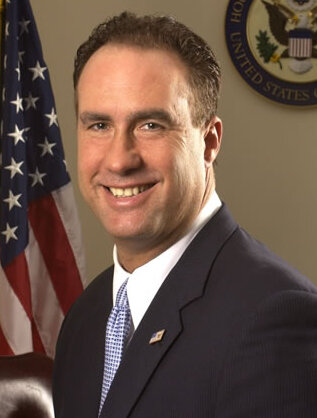

Nominee	John Sweeney	Doris F. Kelly
Party	Republican	Democratic
Percentage	65.8%	33.7%
- County results Sweeney: 50–60% 60–70% 70–80%
U.S. Representative before election
John Sweeney
Republican
Elected U.S. Representative
John Sweeney
Republican

=== Predictions ===
Source	Ranking	As of
The Cook Political Report	Safe R	October 29, 2004
Sabato's Crystal Ball	Safe R	November 1, 2004

== District 21 ==
2004 New York's 21st congressional district election
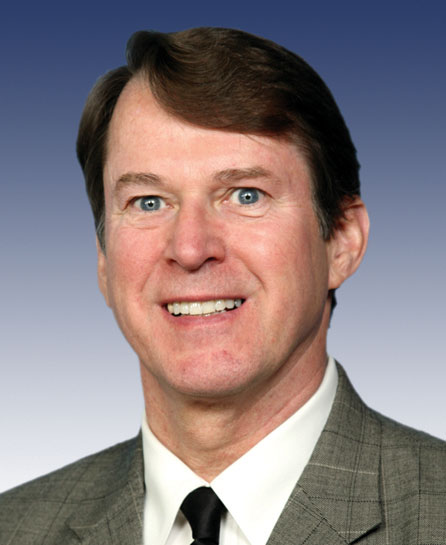

Nominee	Mike McNulty	Warren Redlich
Party	Democratic	Republican
Percentage	70.8%	29.2%
- County results Mcnulty: 50–60% 60–70% 70–80%
U.S. Representative before election
Mike McNulty
Democratic
Elected U.S. Representative
Mike McNulty
Democratic

=== Predictions ===
Source	Ranking	As of
The Cook Political Report	Safe D	October 29, 2004
Sabato's Crystal Ball	Safe D	November 1, 2004

== District 22 ==
2004 New York's 22nd congressional district election
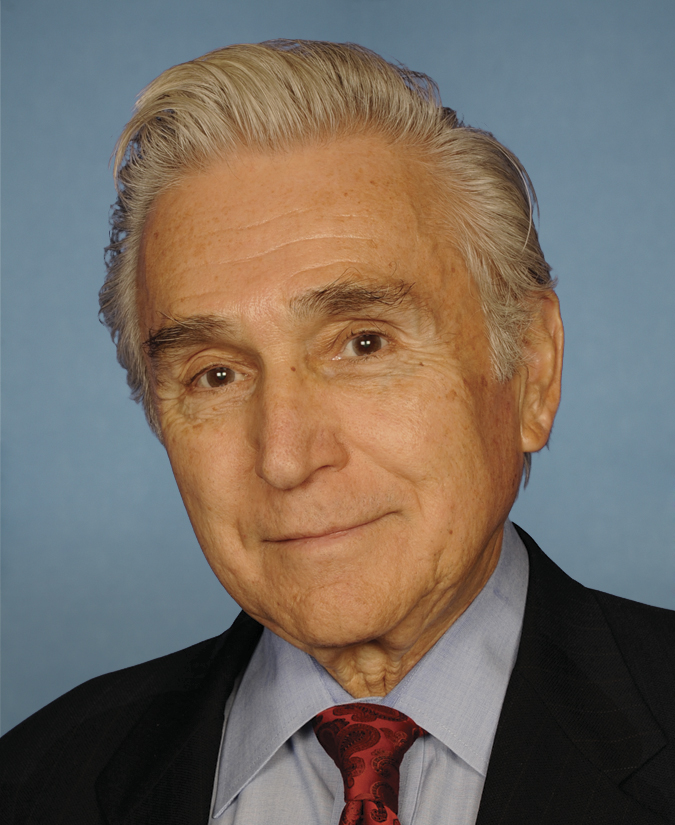

Nominee	Maurice Hinchey	William Brenner
Party	Democratic	Republican
Percentage	67.2%	32.8%
- County results Hinchey: 50–60% 60–70% 70–80% 80–90%
U.S. Representative before election
Maurice Hinchey
Democratic
Elected U.S. Representative
Maurice Hinchey
Democratic

=== Predictions ===
Source	Ranking	As of
The Cook Political Report	Safe D	October 29, 2004
Sabato's Crystal Ball	Safe D	November 1, 2004

== District 23 ==
2004 New York's 23rd congressional district election
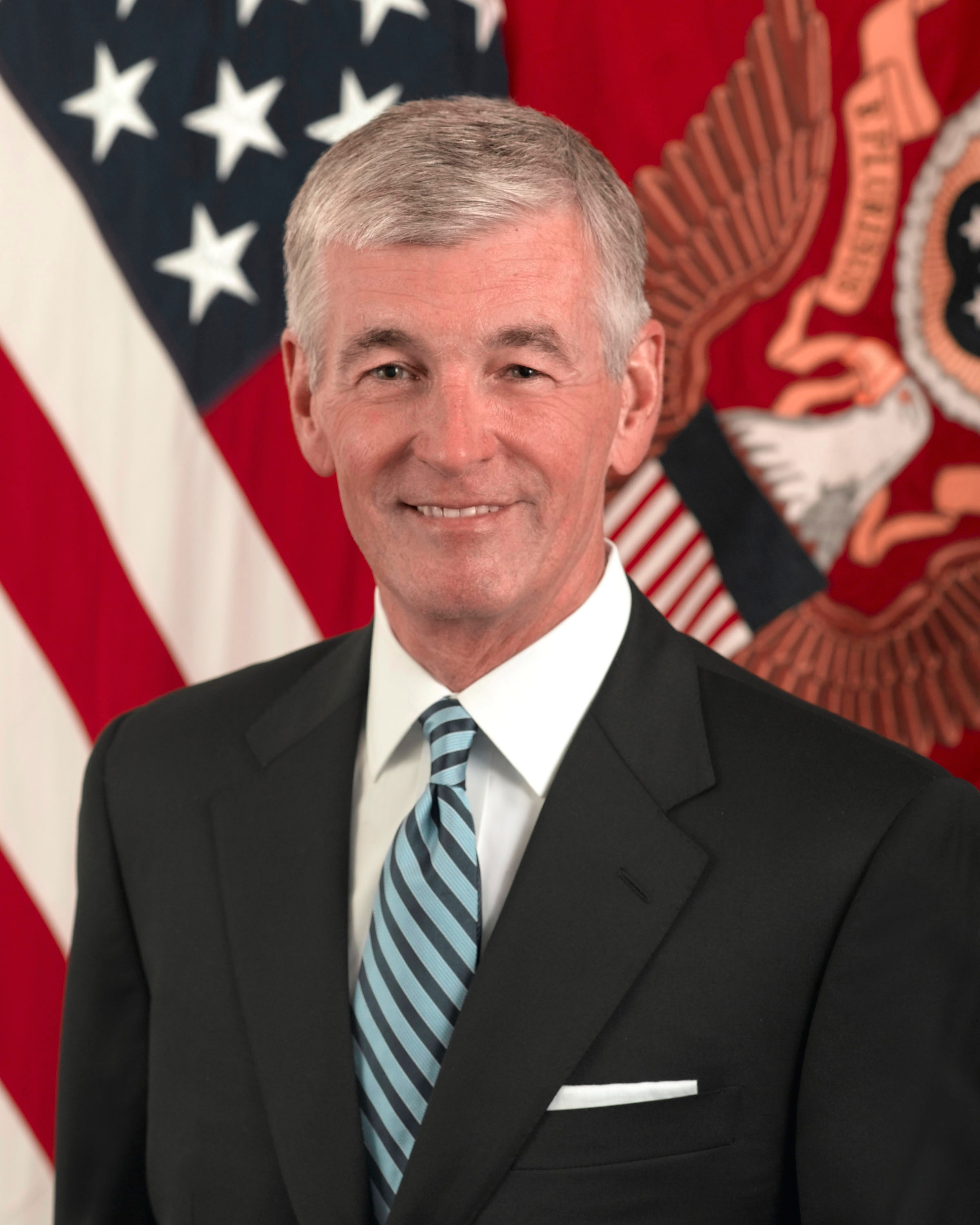

Nominee	John McHugh	Robert J. Johnson
Party	Republican	Democratic
Percentage	70.7%	29.3%
- County results Mchugh: 60–70% 70–80% 80–90%
U.S. Representative before election
John McHugh
Republican
Elected U.S. Representative
John McHugh
Republican

=== Predictions ===
Source	Ranking	As of
The Cook Political Report	Safe R	October 29, 2004
Sabato's Crystal Ball	Safe R	November 1, 2004

== District 24 ==
2004 New York's 24th congressional district election
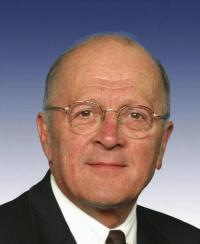

Nominee	Sherwood Boehlert	Jeffrey A. Miller	David L. Walrath
Party	Republican	Democratic	Conservative
Popular vote	143,000	85,140	23,228
Percentage	56.9%	33.9%	9.2%
- County results Boehlert: 40–50% 50–60% 60–70%
U.S. Representative before election
Sherwood Boehlert
Republican
Elected U.S. Representative
Sherwood Boehlert
Republican

=== Predictions ===
Source	Ranking	As of
The Cook Political Report	Safe R	October 29, 2004
Sabato's Crystal Ball	Safe R	November 1, 2004

Results

New York's 24th congressional district election, 2004
Party	Candidate	Votes	%
Republican	Sherwood Boehlert	143,000	56.89%
Democratic	Jeffrey A. Miller	85,140	33.87%
Conservative	David L. Walrath	23,228	9.24%
Total votes		251,368	100.00%

== District 25 ==
2004 New York's 25th congressional district election

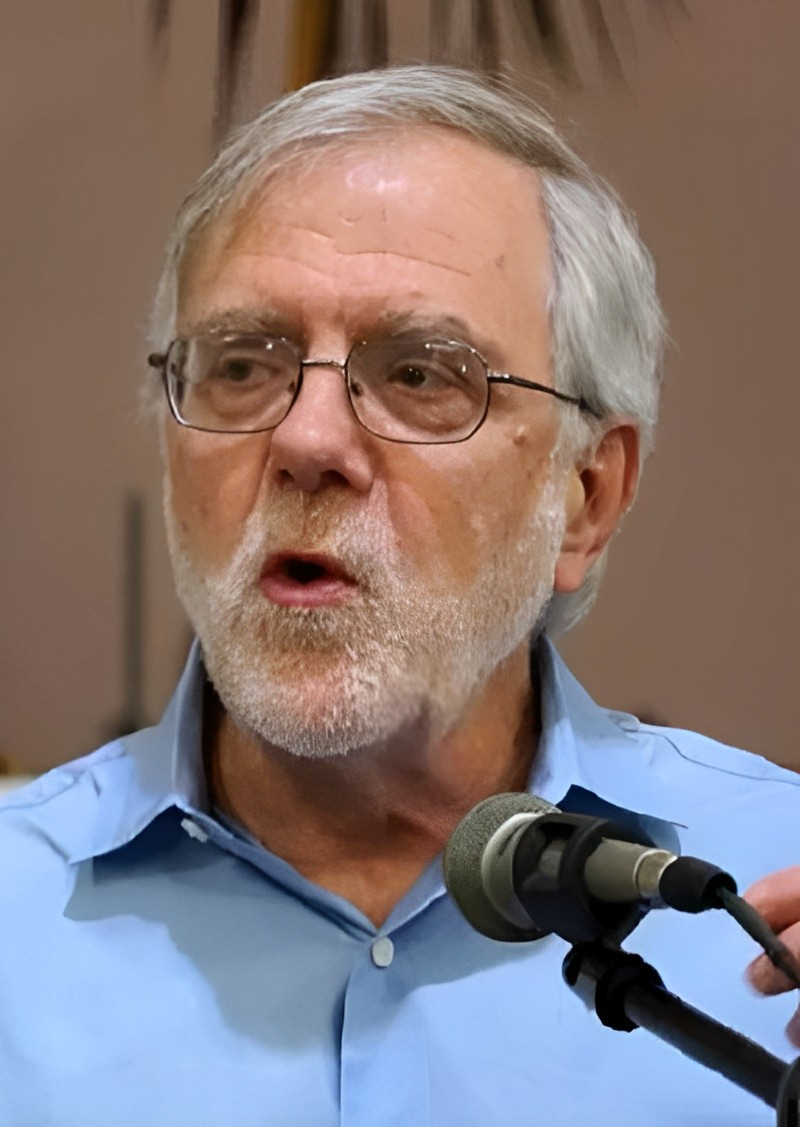
Nominee	James T. Walsh	Howie Hawkins
Party	Republican	Peace and Justice
Popular vote	189,063	20,106
Percentage	90.4%	9.6%
- County results Walsh: 80–90% 90–100%
U.S. Representative before election
James T. Walsh
Republican
Elected U.S. Representative
James T. Walsh
Republican

=== Predictions ===
Source	Ranking	As of
The Cook Political Report	Safe R	October 29, 2004
Sabato's Crystal Ball	Safe R	November 1, 2004

Results

New York's 25th congressional district election, 2004
Party	Candidate	Votes	%
Republican	James T. Walsh	189,063	90.39%
Peace and Justice	Howie Hawkins	20,106	9.61%
Total votes		209,169	100.00%

== District 26 ==
2004 New York's 26th congressional district election
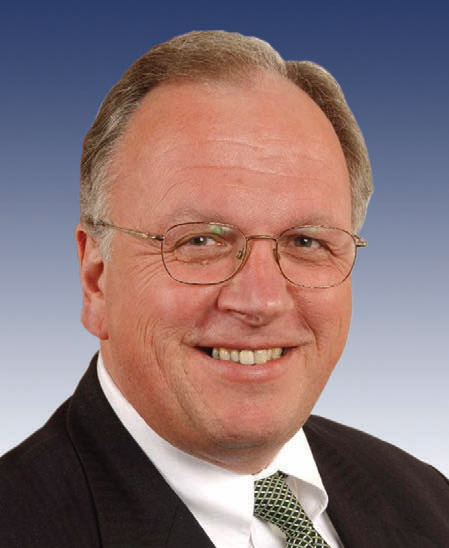

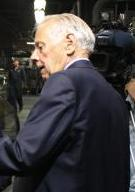
Nominee	Tom Reynolds	Jack Davis
Party	Republican	Democratic
Percentage	55.6%	44.4%
- County results Reynolds: 50–60% 60–70% Davis: 50–60%
U.S. Representative before election
Tom Reynolds
Republican
Elected U.S. Representative
Tom Reynolds
Republican

=== Predictions ===
Source	Ranking	As of
The Cook Political Report	Safe R	October 29, 2004
Sabato's Crystal Ball	Safe R	November 1, 2004

== District 27 ==
2004 New York's 27th congressional district election
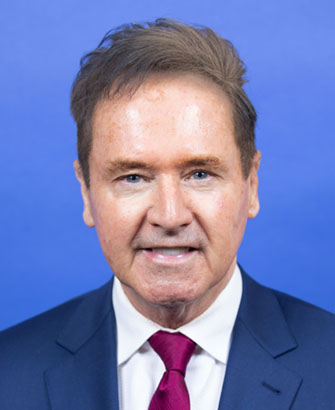

Nominee	Brian Higgins	Nancy Naples
Party	Democratic	Republican
Percentage	50.7%	49.3%
U.S. Representative before election
Jack Quinn
Republican
Elected U.S. Representative
Brian Higgins
Democratic

=== Predictions ===
Source	Ranking	As of
The Cook Political Report	Tossup	October 29, 2004
Sabato's Crystal Ball	Tilt R	November 1, 2004

== District 28 ==
2004 New York's 28th congressional district election
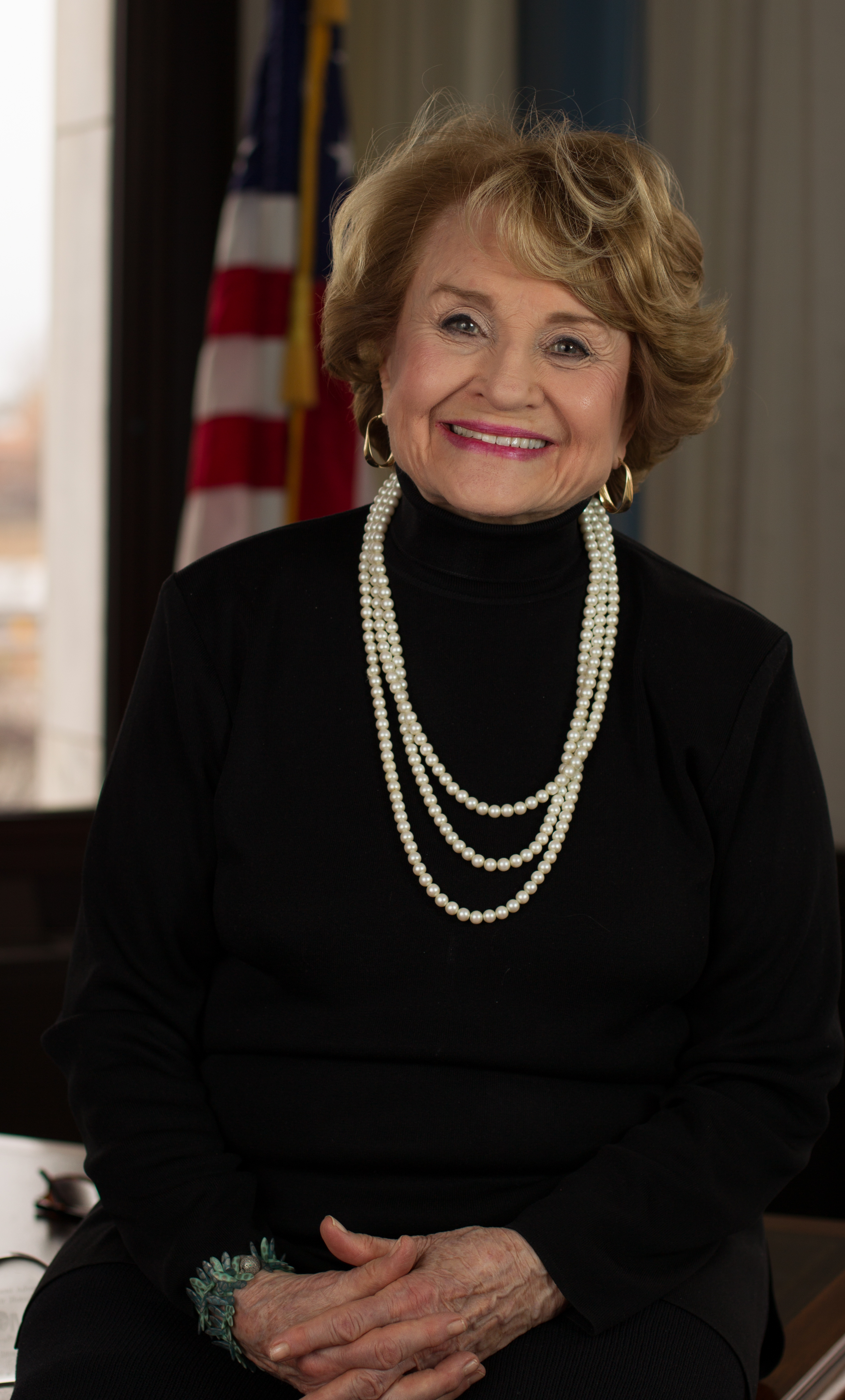

Nominee	Louise Slaughter	Mike Laba
Party	Democratic	Republican
Percentage	72.6%	24.8%
- County results Slaughter: 60–70% 70–80% Laba: 50–60%
U.S. Representative before election
Louise Slaughter
Democratic
Elected U.S. Representative
Louise Slaughter
Democratic

=== Predictions ===
Source	Ranking	As of
The Cook Political Report	Safe D	October 29, 2004
Sabato's Crystal Ball	Safe D	November 1, 2004

== District 29 ==
2004 New York's 29th congressional district election
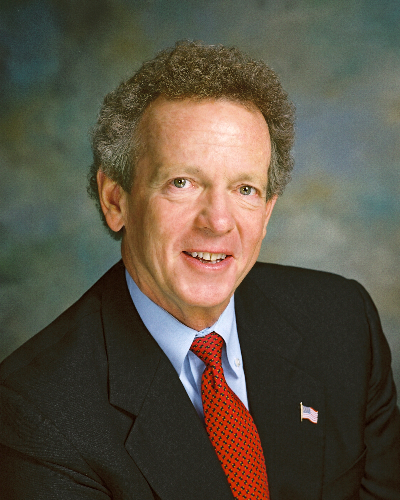

Nominee	Randy Kuhl	Samara Barend	Mark Assini
Party	Republican	Democratic	Conservative
Popular vote	136,883	110,241	17,272
Percentage	50.7%	40.8%	6.4%
- County results Kuhl: 50–60% 60–70% Barend: 40–50%
U.S. Representative before election
Amo Houghton
Republican
Elected U.S. Representative
Randy Kuhl
Republican

=== Candidates ===
- Randy Kuhl (Republican), state senator
- Samara Barend (Democratic), non-profit executive
- Mark Assini (Conservative), Monroe County legislator
- John Ciampoli (Independence), attorney

=== Predictions ===
Source	Ranking	As of
The Cook Political Report	Likely R	October 29, 2004
Sabato's Crystal Ball	Safe R	November 1, 2004

=== Results ===
2004 New York's 29th congressional district general election
Party	Candidate	Votes	%
Republican	Randy Kuhl	136,883	50.66
Democratic	Samara Barend	104,555	38.69
Working Families	Samara Barend	5,686	2.10
Total	Samara Barend	110,241	40.80
Conservative	Mark Assini	17,272	6.40
Independence	John Ciampoli	5,819	2.15
Total votes		270,215	100.0
Republican hold			
