= Raymond J. McGrath =

American politician

Ray McGrath
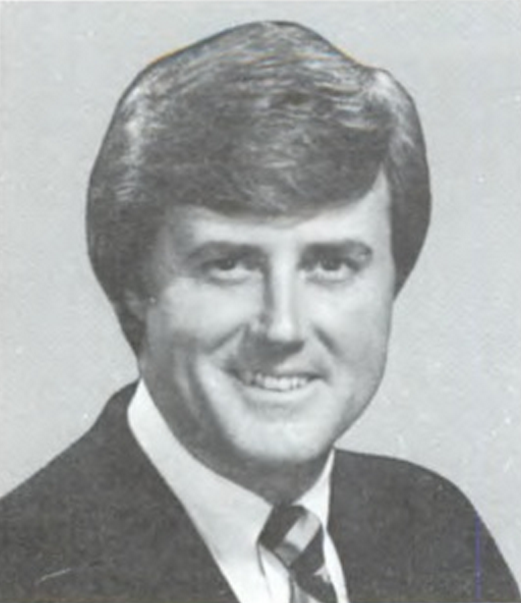

Member of the U.S. House of Representatives from New York's 5th district
- In office January 3, 1981 – January 3, 1993
- Preceded by: John W. Wydler
- Succeeded by: David A. Levy (redistricted)

Member of the New York State Assembly from the 19th district
- In office January 1, 1977 – December 31, 1980
- Preceded by: John S. Thorp Jr.
- Succeeded by: Dean Skelos

Personal details
- Born: Raymond Joseph McGrath; March 27, 1942 (age 84) Valley Stream, New York, U.S.
- Party: Republican
- Education: State University of New York, Brockport (BA); New York University (MA)

Raymond Joseph (Ray) McGrath (born March 27, 1942) is an American educator and politician who served six terms as a member of the United States House of Representatives from 1981 to 1993. He was a Republican from New York.

== Biography ==
McGrath was born in Valley Stream, New York. He graduated from the State University of New York at Brockport in 1963 and received an M.A. from New York University in 1968. Then he taught biology.

== Political career ==
From 1965 to 1971, he also served as Commissioner of the Hempstead Parks and Recreation Bureau.

He was a member of the New York State Assembly from 1977 to 1980, sitting in the 182nd and 183rd New York State Legislatures.

=== Congress ===
He was elected as a Republican to the 97th, 98th, 99th, 100th, 101st and 102nd United States Congresses, holding office from January 3, 1981, to January 3, 1993.

=== Later career ===
Afterwards he became the president of the Beer Institute.

He is currently President of the Downey McGrath Group Inc. in Washington, D.C.

U.S. House of Representatives
Preceded by John W. Wydler	Member of the U.S. House of Representatives from New York's 5th congressional district 1981–1993	Succeeded by Gary Ackerman
U.S. order of precedence (ceremonial)
Preceded by Virgil Goode as Former U.S. Representative	Order of precedence of the United States as Former U.S. Representative	Succeeded by Jack Quinn as Former U.S. Representative
