= David A. Levy =

American politician (born 1953)

David Levy
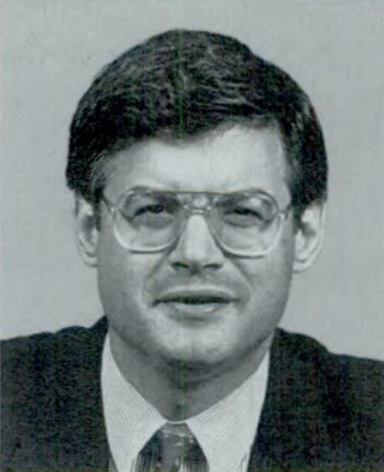

Member of the U.S. House of Representatives from New York's 4th district
- In office January 3, 1993 – January 3, 1995
- Preceded by: Norman F. Lent
- Succeeded by: Dan Frisa

Personal details
- Born: December 18, 1953 (age 72) Johnson County, Indiana, U.S.
- Party: Republican
- Spouse: Tracy Burgess
- Education: Hofstra University (BA, JD)

David A. Levy (born December 18, 1953) is an American Republican politician, lawyer and former member of the United States House of Representatives from New York.

== Education and early career ==
Levy is a graduate of Hofstra University, Village of Hempstead, New York, and Hofstra University's Law School. Before serving as a representative, Levy was a lawyer, utility company executive, and member of the Hempstead Town Council from 1989 to 1993. He has also served in the News Departments of radio stations WGBB (Freeport, New York), WHN (New York), WINS (New York) and WKJY (Hempstead, New York).

== House of Representatives ==
A Republican, Levy succeeded representative Norman F. Lent, who was also a Republican and did not stand for re-election in 1992. He sought his party's renomination in 1994, but it instead went to a more conservative challenger, Dan Frisa, who went on to win election but was defeated after one term by Democrat Carolyn McCarthy.

== Post congress ==
He served as counsel to the town supervisor of Hempstead from 1995 to 2017.

== Personal life ==
Levy is married to former WFAN personality Tracy Burgess.

== See also ==
- List of Jewish members of the United States Congress

U.S. House of Representatives
| Preceded by Norman F. Lent | Member of the U.S. House of Representatives from New York's 4th congressional district 1993–1995 | Succeeded by Daniel Frisa |
U.S. order of precedence (ceremonial)
| Preceded by Fred J. Eckert as Former U.S. Representative | Order of precedence of the United States as Former U.S. Representative | Succeeded by Daniel Frisa as Former U.S. Representative |
