= John W. Wydler =

American politician

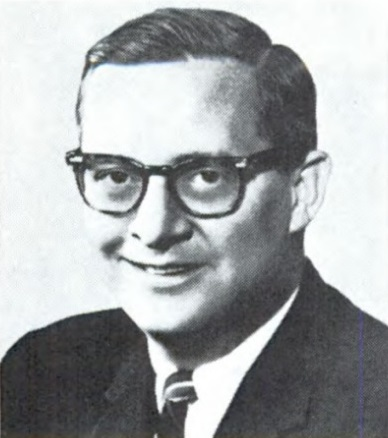

Member of the U.S. House of Representatives from New York
- In office January 3, 1963 – January 3, 1981
- Preceded by: District established (redistricting)
- Succeeded by: Raymond J. McGrath
- Constituency: 4th district (1963–1973); 5th district (1973–1981)

Personal details
- Born: June 9, 1924 Brooklyn, New York, U.S.
- Died: August 4, 1987 (aged 63)
- Education: Brown University

John Waldemar Wydler (June 9, 1924 – August 4, 1987) was a Republican member of the United States House of Representatives from New York.

== Biography ==
Wydler was born in Brooklyn. He served in the United States Army Air Corps from 1942 until 1945. He graduated from Brown University in 1947 and Harvard Law School in 1950. He served in the United States attorney's office for the Eastern District of New York from 1953 until 1959. He was elected to Congress in 1962 and served from January 3, 1963, until January 3, 1981. He was a delegate to the 1968 Republican National Convention.

On December 24, 1987, the U.S. Post Office at Garden City, New York was named in his honor. In addition, the John W. Wydler Government Documents Depository, Axinn Library, at Hofstra University, was also dedicated to him. Wydler is buried in the Cemetery of the Holy Rood in Westbury, New York.

== Sources ==
- United States Congress. "John W. Wydler (id: W000780)". Biographical Directory of the United States Congress.

U.S. House of Representatives
Preceded by Seymour Halpern	Member of the U.S. House of Representatives from New York's 4th congressional district 1963–1973	Succeeded by Norman F. Lent
Preceded by Norman F. Lent	Member of the U.S. House of Representatives from New York's 5th congressional district 1973–1981	Succeeded by Raymond J. McGrath
Preceded by Charles Adams Mosher	Ranking Member of the House Science Committee; 1977–1981	Succeeded by Larry Winn
