= Norman F. Lent =

American politician

Norman Frederick Lent
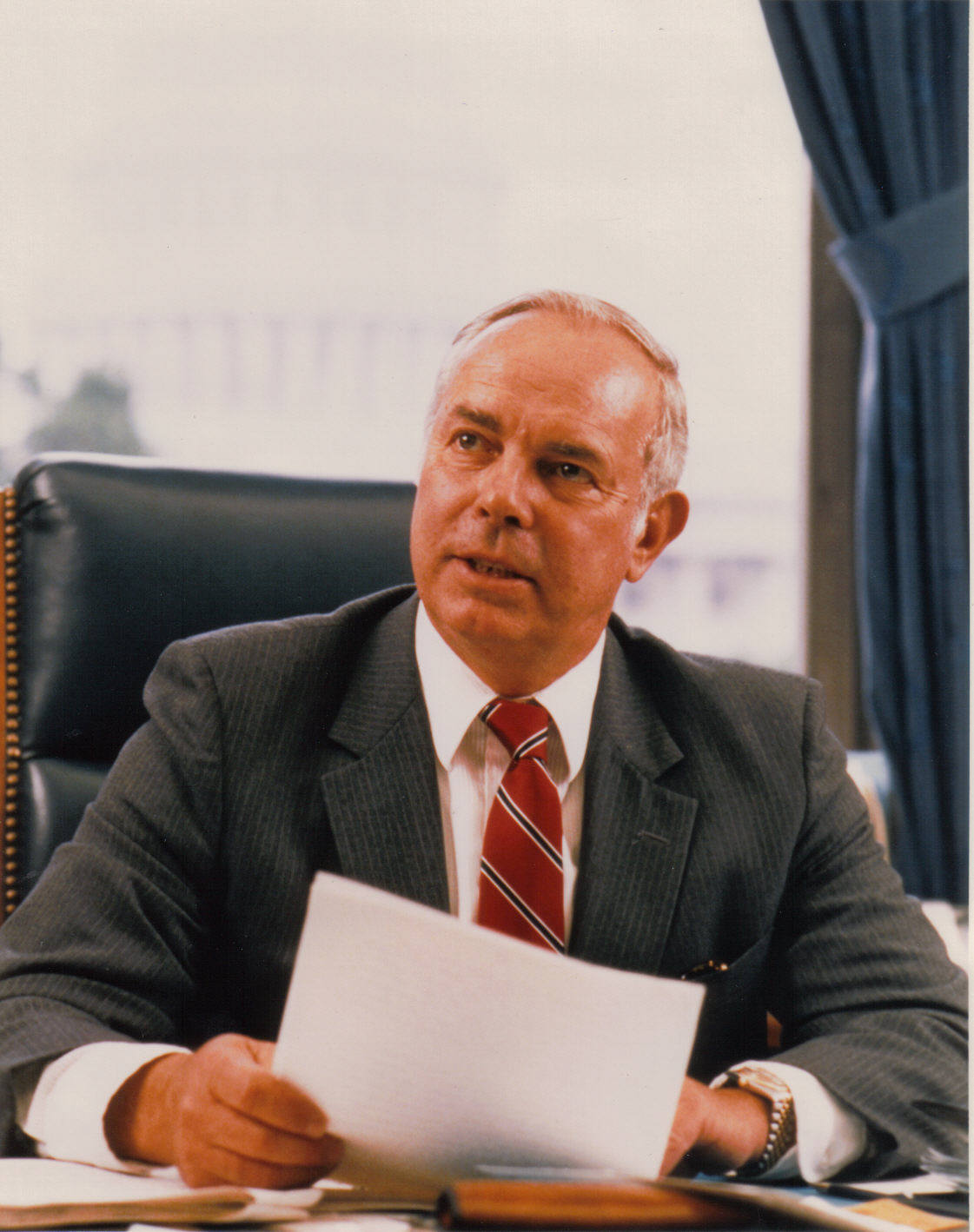

Member of the U.S. House of Representatives from New York
- In office January 3, 1971 – January 3, 1993
- Preceded by: Allard K. Lowenstein
- Succeeded by: David A. Levy
- Constituency: 5th district (1971–1973); 4th district (1973–1993)

Member of the New York State Senate
- In office January 1, 1963 – December 31, 1970
- Preceded by: Daniel G. Albert
- Succeeded by: Norman J. Levy
- Constituency: 2nd district (1963–1965); 6th district (1966); 7th district (1967–1970)

Personal details
- Born: March 23, 1931 Oceanside, New York, U.S.
- Died: June 11, 2012 (aged 81) Arlington, Virginia, U.S.
- Party: Republican
- Spouse: Barbara Morris Lent
- Education: Hofstra University; Cornell Law School
- Occupation: Attorney

Norman Frederick Lent (March 23, 1931 – June 11, 2012) was an American lawyer and politician from New York. Under both the Republican and Conservative Party banners, he served in the New York State Senate from 1963 to 1970 and in the United States House of Representatives for 11 terms from 1971 to 1993. He is the last man to represent the district for more than one term.

== Early life ==
Lent was born in Oceanside, Nassau County, New York. He graduated from Malverne High School in 1948, from Hofstra University in 1952, and from Cornell Law School in 1957. Lent served as a code breaker in the U.S. Navy from 1952 to 1954, during and immediately after the Korean War

Following his military service, Lent worked as a lawyer in private practice in Lynbrook, New York, beginning in 1957, and served as an Associate Police Justice in East Rockaway from 1959 to 1960. He then worked as Confidential Law Secretary for New York Supreme Court Justice Thomas P. Farley from 1960 to 1962.

== Early political career ==
=== New York State Senate ===
Lent was a member of the New York State Senate from 1963 to 1970, sitting in the 174th, 175th, 176th, 177th and 178th New York State Legislatures.

As a State Senator, he opposed the integration of the elementary schools in Malverne, which the state's education commissioner ordered in 1963. After the United States Supreme Court upheld the order, Lent introduced an anti-busing bill in the State Senate that was ultimately signed into law but found unconstitutional by a federal court. Lent stated that he opposed the order because the integration could undermine neighborhood schools.

Lent supported efforts to expand the grounds under which women could have legal abortions in New York. He headed both the Joint Committee on Public Health as well as the Senate Health Committee and pushed for a limited expansion of the law in order to reduce the number of illegal abortions taking place. The joint committee recommended expanding the legal grounds to include forcible rape, incest, substantial risk to the physical or mental health of the mother, unmarried mothers under 16 years, “gross abnormalities” of the fetus, and mental incompetence or physical disability of the mother.

=== Congress ===
Lent was elected as a Republican to the 92nd, 93rd, 94th, 95th, 96th, 97th, 98th, 99th, 100th, 101st and 102nd United States Congresses, holding office from January 3, 1971, to January 3, 1993.

He was a delegate or alternate delegate to the 1972, 1976, 1980, 1984 and 1992 Republican National Conventions.

=== Election ===
Lent entered Congress by defeating an incumbent, the controversial Democratic representative Allard K. Lowenstein, by 9,300 votes in a hotly contested election in a newly drawn, largely Republican district. One of his campaign slogans was the play on words, "Let's vote out Lowenstein for Lent." Long Island's generally liberal Five Towns region had recently been removed from the district, and the far more conservative Massapequa added, during Congressional redistricting by the Republican-controlled State legislature.

The election was viewed nationwide as a referendum on President Richard Nixon's conduct of the Vietnam War. Lent supported Nixon's policy of gradually withdrawing American Forces from Vietnam while turning the fighting over to the South Vietnamese Army.

=== Tenure ===
As a U.S. Representative, Lent was endorsed several times by Long Island's largest newspaper, Newsday, whose editors called Lent a "key player in environmental and energy legislation". He was most active as a member of the House Committee on Energy and Commerce and of the House Committee on Merchant Marine and Fisheries, ultimately becoming the ranking minority member of both committees. He became ranking member of the Energy and Commerce committee after incumbent ranking member, Jim Broyhill, was appointed as a United States Senator in 1986.

Lent worked on drafting and handled floor debate for the Republican minority on some of the most sweeping environmental, energy, telecommunications and transportation legislation enacted during his tenure. These included the Clean Air Act Amendments of 1990, National Energy Policy Act of 1992, Cable Television Act, Legislation ending the 1992 National Rail Strike, the Superfund Act (CERCLA), Resource Conservation & Recovery Act (RCRA), Toxic Substances Control Act (TOSCA), the Conrail Privatization Act, and the Insider Trading and Securities Fraud, Enforcement Act.

=== Awards ===
Lent held Honorary Doctor of Laws Degrees from Hofstra University (1988) and Molloy College (1985) and was the recipient of the Prime Minister's Medal, State of Israel (1977), Distinguished Achievement Medal, Holland Society of New York (1987) and the George Estabrook achievement Award, Hofstra University (1967), along with many other awards.

== Death and burial ==
Lent died on June 11, 2012, at his home in Arlington, Virginia, of cancer.

New York State Senate
Preceded by Daniel G. Albert	Member of the New York State Senate from the 2nd district 1963–1965	Succeeded by Bernard C. Smith
Preceded by Irving Mosberg	Member of the New York State Senate from the 6th district 1966	Succeeded by John R. Dunne
Preceded by John R. Dunne	Member of the New York State Senate from the 7th district 1967–1970	Succeeded by Norman J. Levy
U.S. House of Representatives
Preceded by Allard K. Lowenstein	Member of the U.S. House of Representatives from New York's 5th congressional district 1971–1973	Succeeded by John W. Wydler
Preceded by John W. Wydler	Member of the U.S. House of Representatives from New York's 4th congressional district 1973–1993	Succeeded by David A. Levy
Preceded by Edwin B. Forsythe	Ranking Member of the House Merchant Marine and Fisheries Committee; 1984–1986	Succeeded by Bob Davis
Preceded by Jim Broyhill	Ranking Member of the House Energy and Commerce Committee; 1986–1993	Succeeded by Carlos Moorhead
