= Dan Frisa =

American politician (born 1955)

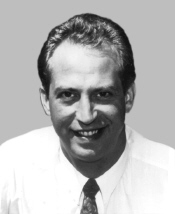

Member of the U.S. House of Representatives from New York's 4th district
- In office January 3, 1995 – January 3, 1997
- Preceded by: David A. Levy
- Succeeded by: Carolyn McCarthy

Member of the New York State Assembly from the 15th district
- In office January 1, 1985 – December 31, 1992
- Preceded by: Angelo F. Orazio
- Succeeded by: Donna Ferrara

Personal details
- Born: Daniel Frisa; April 27, 1955 (age 71) New York City, New York, U.S.
- Party: Republican
- Spouse: Jane Gilmatin
- Children: 1
- Education: St. John's University (BS); Touro University (JD)

Daniel Frisa (born April 27, 1955) is an American lawyer and former Republican politician. He was a United States congressman and a state legislator from New York.

Born in Queens, New York, Frisa attended East Meadow, New York, public schools and graduated from St. John's University. He earned his J.D. degree from Touro Law Center. He became an Eagle Scout at age thirteen. His wife is Jane Gilmartin, and they have 1 child. He also was a marketing representative for Johnson & Johnson and a retail executive for Fortunoff before entering politics. Frisa was a member of the New York State Assembly from 1985 to 1992, sitting in the 186th, 187th, 188th and 189th New York State Legislatures.

Frisa unseated fellow Republican David A. Levy in the 1994 primary election, and served one term in the 104th Congress, representing New York's 4th congressional district.

Frisa ran for re-election in 1996 but was defeated by Carolyn McCarthy, who drew much attention to his opposition to certain federal firearms legislation. McCarthy's husband had died, and her son was injured, in the December 7, 1993, mass shooting by Colin Ferguson aboard a Long Island Rail Road commuter train. The shooting occurred in Frisa's district, and McCarthy became a gun control activist after the incident. The story was depicted in the 1998 television movie The Long Island Incident.

Since leaving Congress, Frisa has written for NewsMax and made appearances on politically oriented television programs. In 2002, he unsuccessfully sought to regain his congressional seat but placed second in a three-way Republican primary that was won by Marilyn O'Grady. Frisa is presently Senior Counsel with SHAHLA PC.

U.S. House of Representatives
Preceded by David A. Levy	Member of the U.S. House of Representatives from New York's 4th congressional district 1995–1997	Succeeded by Carolyn McCarthy
U.S. order of precedence (ceremonial)
Preceded by David A. Levy as Former U.S. Representative	Order of precedence of the United States as Former U.S. Representative	Succeeded by Felix Grucci as Former U.S. Representative
