= Carolyn McCarthy =

American politician (1944–2025)

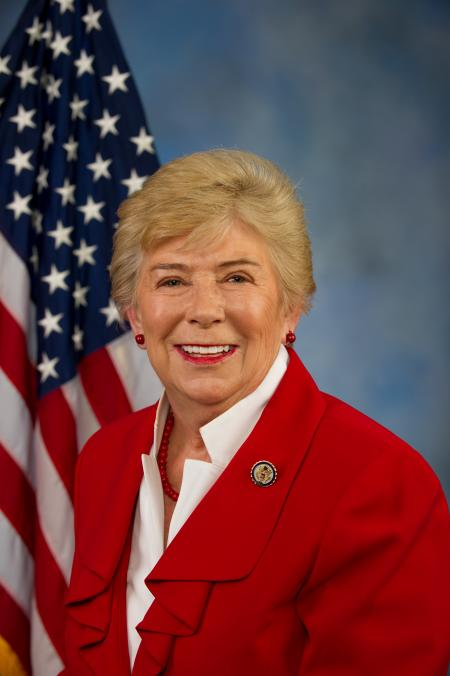
- Official portrait, 2012

Member of the U.S. House of Representatives from New York's 4th district
- In office January 3, 1997 – January 3, 2015
- Preceded by: Dan Frisa
- Succeeded by: Kathleen Rice

Personal details
- Born: Carolyn Cook; January 5, 1944 New York City, U.S.
- Died: June 26, 2025 (aged 81) Fort Myers, Florida, U.S.
- Party: Republican (before 2003); Democratic (2003–2025) (Note: McCarthy first ran for Congress as a Democrat in 1996, and spent her entire congressional tenure in the Democratic caucus, but was registered as a Republican voter until 2003.)
- Other political affiliations: House Democratic Caucus (1997–2015)
- Spouse: Dennis McCarthy (m. 1967; died 1993)
- Children: 1
- Education: Glen Cove Nursing School (DipN)
- McCarthy's voice McCarthy supporting legislation to prevent child abuse in residential care programs. Recorded June 20, 2008

Carolyn McCarthy (née Cook; January 5, 1944 – June 26, 2025) was an American politician who served as a Democratic member of the United States House of Representatives, representing New York's 4th congressional district from 1997 to 2015. A native of the suburban Long Island community of Mineola, New York, she worked as a nurse and was a registered Republican. However, she was motivated to enter politics after her husband was killed and her son was wounded in the 1993 Long Island Rail Road shooting. She became an advocate for gun control legislation, and in 1996, she was elected to the House as a Democrat, defeating a Republican incumbent. She served a total of nine terms.

In 2009, there were two sexual harassment complaints brought against her office. It was later revealed that $8,000 was paid from taxpayer funds to settle the claims.

On January 8, 2014, she announced that she would not run for re-election that November, citing health; she retired in January 2015 and was succeeded by fellow Democrat Kathleen Rice.

== Early life ==
McCarthy was born Carolyn Cook in Brooklyn, New York, on January 5, 1944, and was raised in Mineola, New York, on Long Island. Her father was a boilermaker and her mother worked at Woolworth. In her youth, she was an athlete and wanted to become a physical education teacher but found reading challenging and later was diagnosed with dyslexia. She then studied at the Glen Cove Nursing School. After caring for a boyfriend who was injured in a car accident and being moved by the care given to him by nursing staff, Cook decided to work as a Licensed Practical Nurse. In 1967, she married Dennis McCarthy; they had a son, Kevin, and lived in Mineola.

By 1993, both McCarthy's husband and son worked for Prudential Securities in Manhattan, and commuted on the Long Island Rail Road (LIRR). On December 7 of that year, Dennis McCarthy was killed and Kevin was severely injured on an LIRR train at the Merillon Avenue station in the village of Garden City, when 35-year-old Colin Ferguson opened fire on passengers. Ferguson killed six and wounded 19 others. Carolyn McCarthy responded to the crime by launching a campaign for more stringent gun control that eventually propelled her to Congress in 1996 on the Democratic ticket. She defeated freshman Republican Dan Frisa by a large margin. In the biographical 1998 television movie The Long Island Incident, which portrayed these events, she was played by actress Laurie Metcalf.

== U.S. House of Representatives ==
During her time in Congress, McCarthy was described as "the doyenne of anti-gun advocates in the House" and "the fiercest gun-control advocate in Congress". She made attempts to broaden her policy portfolio, but was never able to entirely shed the label of being a one-issue congresswoman. She acknowledged this, saying in 2009 that although she is also known for her education and district work, she is still the "gun lady". McCarthy was a registered Republican before her first run for Congress, although she ran for office as a Democrat and "evolved" over the years into a reliable Democratic vote. She voted with her party 98.1 percent of the time during the 111th Congress.

=== Committee assignments ===
- Committee on Education and the Workforce
  - Subcommittee on Early Childhood, Elementary and Secondary Education (Ranking Member)
  - Subcommittee on Higher Education and Workforce Training
- Committee on Financial Services
  - Subcommittee on Financial Institutions and Consumer Credit
  - Subcommittee on Housing and Insurance

=== Caucus memberships ===
- Co-chair, Congressional Hearing Health Caucus
- Congressional Glaucoma Caucus
- Financial Literacy Caucus
- International Conservation Caucus
- U.S.-Israel Security Caucus
- Women's Caucus

== Political positions ==
=== Gun control ===
McCarthy's husband Dennis was murdered in the 1993 Long Island Rail Road shooting, which first prompted her to run for Congress.

McCarthy was one of the nation's most vocal gun control advocates. In 1997, she sponsored a bill requiring trigger locks on guns. After the 1997 Empire State Building shooting, she introduced legislation to ban the sale of guns to tourists visiting the United States; afterwards, she received "threats serious enough to require police protection during most public appearances". Later that year, McCarthy unsuccessfully opposed a Treasury bill provision that allowed the importation of weapons that had been modified in order to be compliant with the federal assault weapons ban. In the aftermath of the Columbine High School massacre, McCarthy proposed a bill that would require firearms to be child-resistant, would make it more difficult for young adults to purchase guns, and would regulate gun shows.

After the Federal Assault Weapons Ban expired in September 2004, McCarthy introduced the Assault Weapons Ban and Law Enforcement Protection Act of 2007 to reauthorize it in February 2007.

On April 16, 2007, after the Virginia Tech shootings, McCarthy issued a press release calling for "legislation to prevent further acts of gun violence". Shooter Seung-Hui Cho had passed a background check despite his mental health issues owing to an inconsistent sharing of records between the federal and state governments. McCarthy introduced (H.R. 2640, the NICS Improvement Amendments Act of 2007) to remedy this problem. The bill, with the support of the National Rifle Association, was passed by the House and signed by President Bush. McCarthy said her next priority was closing the gun show loophole.

In January 2012, McCarthy along with Senator Dianne Feinstein from California proposed a bill which would "ban the sale, transfer, manufacturing of importation of 150 specific firearms including semiautomatic rifles or pistols that can be used with a detachable or fixed ammunition magazines that hold more than 10 rounds and have specific military-style features, including pistol grips, grenade launchers or rocket launchers." McCarthy spoke on the bill saying, "The American people are on our side this time, and we do outnumber some of the people who are fighting against us this time."

On a 2007 episode of MSNBC's program Tucker, Tucker Carlson interviewed McCarthy about the Virginia Tech massacre and her proposed reauthorization of the Federal Assault Weapons Ban. She said that the legislation would ban large capacity "clips" and "shoulder things that go up."

=== War in Iraq ===
McCarthy voted in favor of the Iraq War Resolution in 2002. In 2006, she voted in support of a Republican resolution in support of the war.

=== Death penalty ===
In her 1996 race, McCarthy said she was against the death penalty but added that she wouldn't support repeal because her district supported it.

=== Hearing loss ===
McCarthy was one of the strongest advocates of hearing loss detection, prevention, and treatment. A onetime nurse, she repeatedly championed the Hearing Aid Tax Credit Act, which is designed to help those with hearing loss to afford hearing aids.

=== Abortion ===
McCarthy consistently supported a pro-choice abortion platform. In 1997, McCarthy voted against a ban on late-term abortions. In 2003, she was rated 100% by NARAL, and in 2006 she was rated 0% by the NRLC; both scores indicate a strongly pro-choice stance.

=== Age discrimination ===
In 2003, McCarthy introduced legislation prohibiting companies from compelling the retirement of older employees and denying them pension and benefits.

=== Special education ===
McCarthy, who had dyslexia, testified in support of the Individuals with Disabilities Education Act and co-sponsored an act to fund early detection of dyslexia.

=== Children's health insurance program ===
In September 2007, McCarthy supported an increase of $35 billion for the State Children's Health Insurance Program (SCHIP), the national program to provide health care for children from families who earn too much to qualify for Medicaid but cannot afford private health insurance. She said, "No child in the 4th Congressional District, Long Island, or anywhere throughout our nation should ever go without medical care." The increase passed but was later vetoed by President George W. Bush.

=== Stem cell research ===
McCarthy was a supporter of federally funded stem cell research but restricted to the use of embryos that would be discarded. In 2007, she supported the Stem Cell Research Enhancement Act which did just that. It passed both the House and Senate but was later vetoed by President Bush.

=== Financial reform ===
On November 4, 1999, McCarthy voted in favor of the Gramm-Leach-Bliley Act.

=== Tea party ===
In a 2011 press release, McCarthy expressed her sentiments on the Tea Party, saying "It's time to stop letting the Tea Party hold the House of Representatives hostage."

== Political campaigns ==
The Fourth District and its predecessors had been in Republican hands since 1953, even though Nassau County has leaned Democratic for president since 1992. In 1996, the district's first-term Republican incumbent Dan Frisa was running for re-election at the time that McCarthy testified at a congressional hearing against an ultimately unsuccessful Republican attempt to repeal the Federal Assault Weapons Ban in a congressional hearing.

After Frisa voted for the repeal, McCarthy, a lifelong Republican, announced she would run against him in the primary. However, local Republican officials showed no support for her candidacy. So, with the support of the local and national Democratic parties, and the endorsement of Newsday, the local daily newspaper, McCarthy ran as a Democrat and defeated Frisa by seventeen points. Afterwards, some Republicans tried unsuccessfully to persuade her to run as a Republican in 1998.

She faced a close fight for reelection in 1998 against state assemblyman Gregory Becker. In 2004, she faced Hempstead mayor James Garner. The race was expected to be competitive, but McCarthy won easily, taking 63% of the vote.

Although McCarthy always served as a Democrat, she did not change her voter registration from Republican until 2003.

=== 2010 ===
Before the election, it was reported that Democrats were concerned that McCarthy was in danger of losing her seat. In the end, however, McCarthy defeated Republican challenger Francis X. Becker, Jr, by a margin of 54% to 46%.

Earlier in 2010, it was widely reported that McCarthy was considering entering the 2010 special senatorial election to challenge Senator Kirsten Gillibrand, owing to the latter's support for gun rights. Gillibrand had been appointed to the seat on January 23, 2009, by Governor David Paterson to succeed Hillary Clinton, who had left the Senate to become Secretary of State in the new Obama administration. McCarthy commented, saying: "I've spent 15 years trying to prevent gun violence in this country, and if he [Paterson] does pick her [Gillibrand] and if no one goes and primaries her, I will primary her." She said she would not let New York be represented by someone with a 100% rating of the NRA. On MSNBC's Hardball with Chris Matthews, McCarthy said that she thought Gillibrand was working for the NRA. On June 4, 2009, however, McCarthy announced that she would not mount a primary challenge to Gillibrand.

=== 2012 ===
In early 2012, there was a question as to whether redistricting might eliminate McCarthy's district. In the end, her district was left essentially intact.

== Electoral history ==
Third-party candidates omitted, so percentages may not add up to 100%.

New York's 4th U.S. Congressional District
Year	Candidate	Votes	%	±%
2012	Carolyn McCarthy (D)	138,561	62%	+8%
2012	Fran Becker Jr. (R)	72,673	32%	
2010	Carolyn McCarthy (D)	89,828	54%	-8%
2010	Fran Becker Jr.	77,483	46%	
2008	Carolyn McCarthy (D)	164,028	62%	-2.9%
2008	Jack Martins (R)	94,242	38%	
2006	Carolyn McCarthy (D)	101,861	64.9%	+1.9%
2006	Martin W. Blessinger (R)	55,050	35.1%	
2004	Carolyn McCarthy (D)	159,969	63.0%	+7.1%
2004	James Garner (R)	94,141	37.0%	
2002	Carolyn McCarthy (D)	93,651	55.9%	-4.7%
2002	Marilyn F. O'Grady (R)	72,882	43.5%	
2000	Carolyn McCarthy (D)	136,703	60.6%	+8.0
2000	Gregory R. Becker (R)	87,830	38.9%	
1998	Carolyn McCarthy (D)	90,256	52.6%	-4.9
1998	Gregory R. Becker (R)	79,984	46.6%	
1996	Carolyn McCarthy (D)	127,060	57.5%	
1996	Daniel Frisa (R)	89,542	40.5%	-9.7%

== Illness and death ==
McCarthy announced on June 3, 2013, that she had a treatable form of lung cancer. Though a heavy smoker for some forty years, she publicly attributed her cancer to asbestos, and in November 2013, she announced she would sue more than 70 companies that she blamed for asbestos exposure. She said that her father and brother, whose clothes she washed, worked with asbestos. The lawsuit was criticized by New York Times columnist Joe Nocera, who claimed McCarthy was part of a growing trend of cigarette smokers suing companies that once used asbestos, citing her nearly lifelong "pack-a-day" habit as evidence that she was knowingly bringing a bogus case and partaking in a widespread "asbestos scam".

McCarthy, who moved to Fort Myers, Florida after leaving Congress, died at home on June 26, 2025, at the age of 81.

== Recognition ==
In January 2025, President Joe Biden named McCarthy as a recipient of the Presidential Citizens Medal, along with nineteen others.

== See also ==
- Women in the United States House of Representatives

== Notes ==
U.S. House of Representatives
Preceded by Dan Frisa	Member of the U.S. House of Representatives from New York's 4th congressional district 1997–2015	Succeeded by Kathleen Rice
