= James Garner (politician) =

American politician

James A. Garner
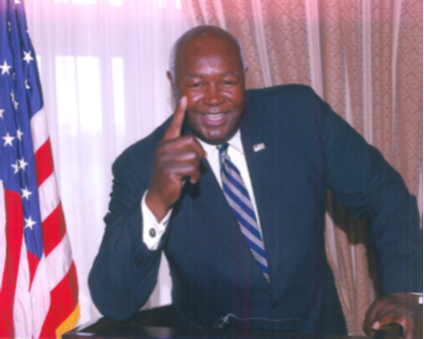

Mayor of Hempstead, New York
- In office 1989–2005

61st President of the United States Conference of Mayors
- In office 2003–2004
- Preceded by: Thomas Menino
- Succeeded by: Don Plusquellic

Personal details
- Born: North Carolina
- Party: Republican, Conservative
- Education: Adelphi University
- Occupation: Politician; businessman

Military service
- Branch/service: United States Army
- Years of service: 1966–1969

James A. Garner is an American businessman and politician from the Republican Party, who served as Mayor of the Village of Hempstead, New York between 1988 and 2005, and was the first African-American to be elected a mayor on Long Island.

== Biography ==
During his tenure as mayor, Garner took a lead role in revitalization, redevelopment, and housing issues facing Hempstead, and was a panelist on the 2002 White House Conference on Minority Homeownership, among other roles. In, 2003 the United States Conference of Mayors elected Garner its 61st president, a position he held for one year.

In 2004, Garner was nominated by the Republican Party to challenge Representative Carolyn McCarthy in New York's 4th congressional district. The race was widely expected to be a close one, but McCarthy won with 63% of the vote. Democratic presidential candidate John Kerry carried 55% of the district's vote in that same election. Six months later in March, 2005, Garner was defeated by Democrat Wayne Hall in his reelection bid for Mayor of Hempstead. This was also evident in the 2009 race for mayor when Hall defeated Garner with 48 percent of the total vote.

Prior to becoming the Mayor of Hempstead, Garner served one term on the Hempstead Village Board of Trustees. He is a Vietnam-era veteran and holds a B.S. from Adelphi University, and founded a pest-control company that is today owned and operated by his family. His membership in community groups includes the American Legion and the NAACP.

Garner also served as the appointed Deputy Nassau County Comptroller for Claims, Payroll & Health Benefits under Comptroller George Maragos.

=== Military service ===
Garner is a veteran of the Vietnam War where he served in the United States Army between 1966 and 1969.

== See also ==
- List of first African-American mayors
- Noah Burroughs
