= 2000 United States House of Representatives elections in New York =

- November 7, 2000

All 31 New York seats to the United States House of Representatives
	Majority party	Minority party
Party	Democratic	Republican
Last election	19	12
Seats won	19	12
Seat change	Steady	Steady
- Results: Democratic hold Democratic gain Republican hold Republican gain

The 2000 United States House of Representatives elections in New York were held on November 7, 2000, to elect the 31 United States representatives from the State of New York, one from each of the state's 31 congressional districts. The elections were held concurrently with other elections in the state for president and vice president, U.S. Senate, state senate, state assembly, state supreme court, ballot proposition one, and various other local offices. Both major parties in the U.S. congressional delegation from New York maintained their overall seat count, though the Republican Party gained a seat from the Democratic party in New York's first district, and the Democratic Party gained a seat from the Republican Party in New York's second district.

== Overview ==
District	Incumbent			Results	Candidates
District	Member	Party	First elected	Results	Candidates
New York 1	Michael Forbes	Democratic	1994 (Note: Forbes was first elected as a Republican. He switched to the Democratic Party in July 1999.)	Incumbent lost re-election as an independent. New member elected. Republican gain.	✓ Felix Grucci (Republican) 56%; Regina Seltzer (Democratic) 41%; Michael Forbes (Independent) 3%
New York 2	Rick Lazio	Republican	1992	Incumbent retired to run for U.S. Senator. New member elected. Democratic gain.	✓ Steve Israel (Democratic) 48%; Joan Johnson (Republican) 34%; Robert Walsh (Independent) 6%; Richard Thompson (Independent) 6%; David Bishop (Independent) 6%
New York 3	Peter T. King	Republican	1992	Incumbent re-elected.	✓ Peter T. King (Republican) 60%; Dal Lamagna (Democratic) 40%
New York 4	Carolyn McCarthy	Democratic	1996	Incumbent re-elected.	✓ Carolyn McCarthy (Democratic) 61%; Gregory Becker (Republican) 39%
New York 5	Gary Ackerman	Democratic	1983	Incumbent re-elected.	✓ Gary Ackerman (Democratic) 68%; Edward Elkowitz (Republican) 31%
New York 6	Gregory W. Meeks	Democratic	1998	Incumbent re-elected.	✓ Gregory W. Meeks (Democratic) Unopposed
New York 7	Joseph Crowley	Democratic	1998	Incumbent re-elected.	✓ Joseph Crowley (Democratic) 71%; Rose Birtley (Republican) 23%; Paul Gilman (Green) 1%
New York 8	Jerrold Nadler	Democratic	1992	Incumbent re-elected.	✓ Jerrold Nadler (Democratic) 81%; Marian Henry (Republican) 16%; Dan Wentzel (Green) 3%
New York 9	Anthony Weiner	Democratic	1998	Incumbent re-elected.	✓ Anthony Weiner (Democratic) 68%; Noach Dear (Republican) 32%
New York 10	Edolphus Towns	Democratic	1982	Incumbent re-elected.	✓ Edolphus Towns (Democratic) 90%; Ernestine Brown (Republican) 6%
New York 11	Major Owens	Democratic	1982	Incumbent re-elected.	✓ Major Owens (Democratic) 88%; Susan Cleary (Republican) 7%
New York 12	Nydia Velázquez	Democratic	1992	Incumbent re-elected.	✓ Nydia Velázquez (Democratic) 87.1%; Rosemarie Markgraf (Republican) 10.1%
New York 13	Vito Fossella	Republican	1997	Incumbent re-elected.	✓ Vito Fossella (Republican) 65%; Katina Johnstone (Democratic) 34%
New York 14	Carolyn Maloney	Democratic	1992	Incumbent re-elected.	✓ Carolyn Maloney (Democratic) 74%; Carla Rhodes (Republican) 23%; Sandy Stevens (Green) 2%
New York 15	Charles B. Rangel	Democratic	1970	Incumbent re-elected.	✓ Charles B. Rangel (Democratic) 91%; Jose Augustin Suero (Republican) 6%; Dean Loren (Green) 2%
New York 16	José E. Serrano	Democratic	1990	Incumbent re-elected.	✓ José E. Serrano (Democratic) 96%; Aaron Justice (Republican) 4%
New York 17	Eliot Engel	Democratic	1988	Incumbent re-elected.	✓ Eliot Engel (Democratic) 89%; Patrick McManus (Republican) 11%
New York 18	Nita Lowey	Democratic	1988	Incumbent re-elected.	✓ Nita Lowey (Democratic) 67%; John Vonglis (Republican) 32%
New York 19	Sue W. Kelly	Republican	1994	Incumbent re-elected.	✓ Sue W. Kelly (Republican) 61%; Lawrence Otis Graham (Democratic) 36%; Mark Jacobs (Green) 2%
New York 20	Benjamin A. Gilman	Republican	1972	Incumbent re-elected.	✓ Benjamin A. Gilman (Republican) 58%; Paul Feiner (Democratic) 41%
New York 21	Michael R. McNulty	Democratic	1988	Incumbent re-elected.	✓ Michael R. McNulty (Democratic) 74%; Thomas Pillsworth (Republican) 26%
New York 22	John E. Sweeney	Republican	1998	Incumbent re-elected.	✓ John E. Sweeney (Republican) 67.9%; Kenneth McCallion (Democratic) 32.1%
New York 23	Sherwood Boehlert	Republican	1982	Incumbent re-elected.	✓ Sherwood Boehlert (Republican) 60%; Richard Englebrecht (Democratic) 20%
New York 24	John M. McHugh	Republican	1992	Incumbent re-elected.	✓ John M. McHugh (Republican) 75%; Neil Tallon (Democratic) 23%
New York 25	James T. Walsh	Republican	1988	Incumbent re-elected.	✓ James T. Walsh (Republican) 69%; Francis Gavin (Democratic) 30%; Howie Hawkins (Green) 2%
New York 26	Maurice Hinchey	Democratic	1992	Incumbent re-elected.	✓ Maurice Hinchey (Democratic) 62%; Bob Moppert (Republican) 38%
New York 27	Thomas M. Reynolds	Republican	1998	Incumbent re-elected.	✓ Thomas M. Reynolds (Republican) 70%; Thomas Pecoraro (Democratic) 30%
New York 28	Louise Slaughter	Democratic	1986	Incumbent re-elected.	✓ Louise Slaughter (Democratic) 66%; Mark Johns (Republican) 33%; Eve Hawkins (Green) 1%
New York 29	John J. LaFalce	Democratic	1974	Incumbent re-elected.	✓ John J. LaFalce (Democratic) 61%; Brett Sommer (Republican) 39%
New York 30	Jack Quinn	Republican	1992	Incumbent re-elected.	✓ Jack Quinn (Republican) 67%; John Fee (Democratic) 33%
New York 31	Amo Houghton	Republican	1986	Incumbent re-elected.	✓ Amo Houghton (Republican) 77%; Kisun Peters (Democratic) 23%

== District 1 ==
2000 New York's 1st congressional district election
- November 7, 2000
Nominee	Felix Grucci	Regina Seltzer
Party	Republican	Democratic
Alliance	Conservative
Popular vote	133,020	97,299
Percentage	55.52%	40.61%
- County results Grucci: 50–60%
U.S. Representative before election
Michael Forbes
Democratic
Elected U.S. Representative
Felix Grucci
Republican

The 1st district is based on the eastern end of Long Island, including the Hamptons, Smithtown, Brookhaven, Riverhead, Port Jefferson, and portions of Lake Ronkonkoma, all in Suffolk County. The district has a PVI of R+4 but voted for Al Gore by points in 2000. The incumbent was Democrat Michael Forbes, who was reelected as a Republican with 64.13% of the vote in 1998. Forbes switched parties in June 1999, after disagreements with his party leaders.

Forbes received a primary challenge from Regina Seltzer, a pro bono environmental lawyer and former Brookhaven town council member. On primary day, Seltzer defeated the incumbent Forbes by just 35 votes.

=== Republican/Conservative/Independence/Right to Life nominee ===
- Felix Grucci, Brookhaven Town Supervisor

=== Democratic Primary ===
==== Democratic nominee ====
- Regina Seltzer, environmental attorney

Democratic primary results
Party	Candidate	Votes	%
Democratic	Regina Seltzer	6,077	50.14
Democratic	Michael Forbes (incumbent)	6,042	49.86
Total votes		12,119	100.0

== District 2 ==
2000 New York's 2nd congressional district election
- November 7, 2000
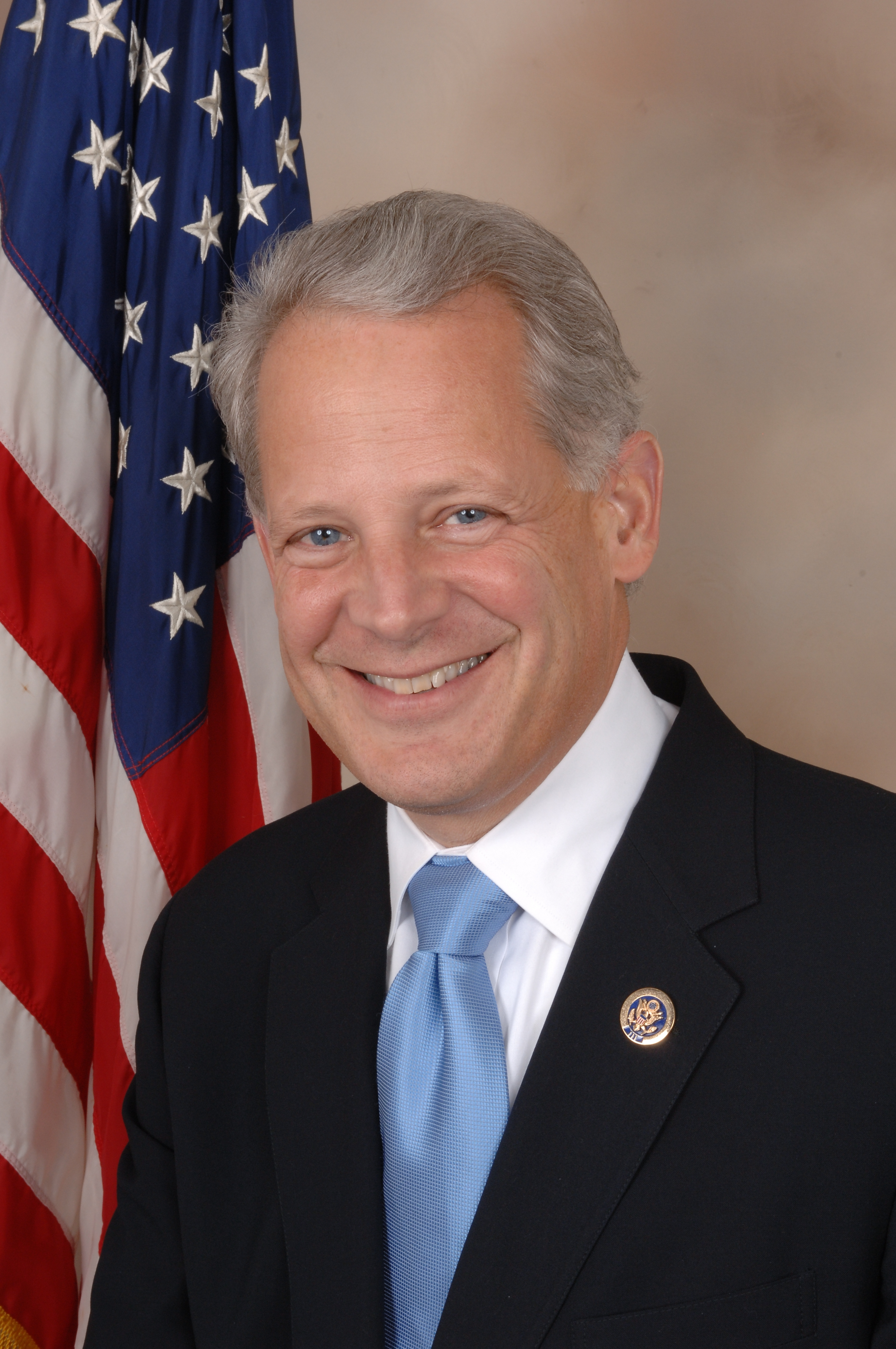

Nominee	Steve Israel	Joan Johnson
Party	Democratic	Republican
Popular vote	90,438	65,880
Percentage	47.9%	34.9%
- County results Israel: 40–50%
U.S. Representative before election
Rick Lazio
Republican
Elected U.S. Representative
Steve Israel
Democratic

Incumbent Republican Rick Lazio, who was first elected in 1992, retired to run for the U.S. Senate. Steve Israel won the open seat with 47.9% of the vote.

=== General election ===
==== Results ====
New York's 2nd congressional district election, 2000
Party	Candidate	Votes	%
Democratic	Steve Israel	90,438	47.9
Republican	Joan Johnson	65,880	34.9
Right to Life	Robert Walsh	11,224	6.0
Conservative	Richard Thompson	10,824	5.7
Green	David Bishop	10,266	5.4
Total votes		188,632	100.0
Democratic gain from Republican			

== District 3 ==
2000 New York's 3rd congressional district election
- November 7, 2000
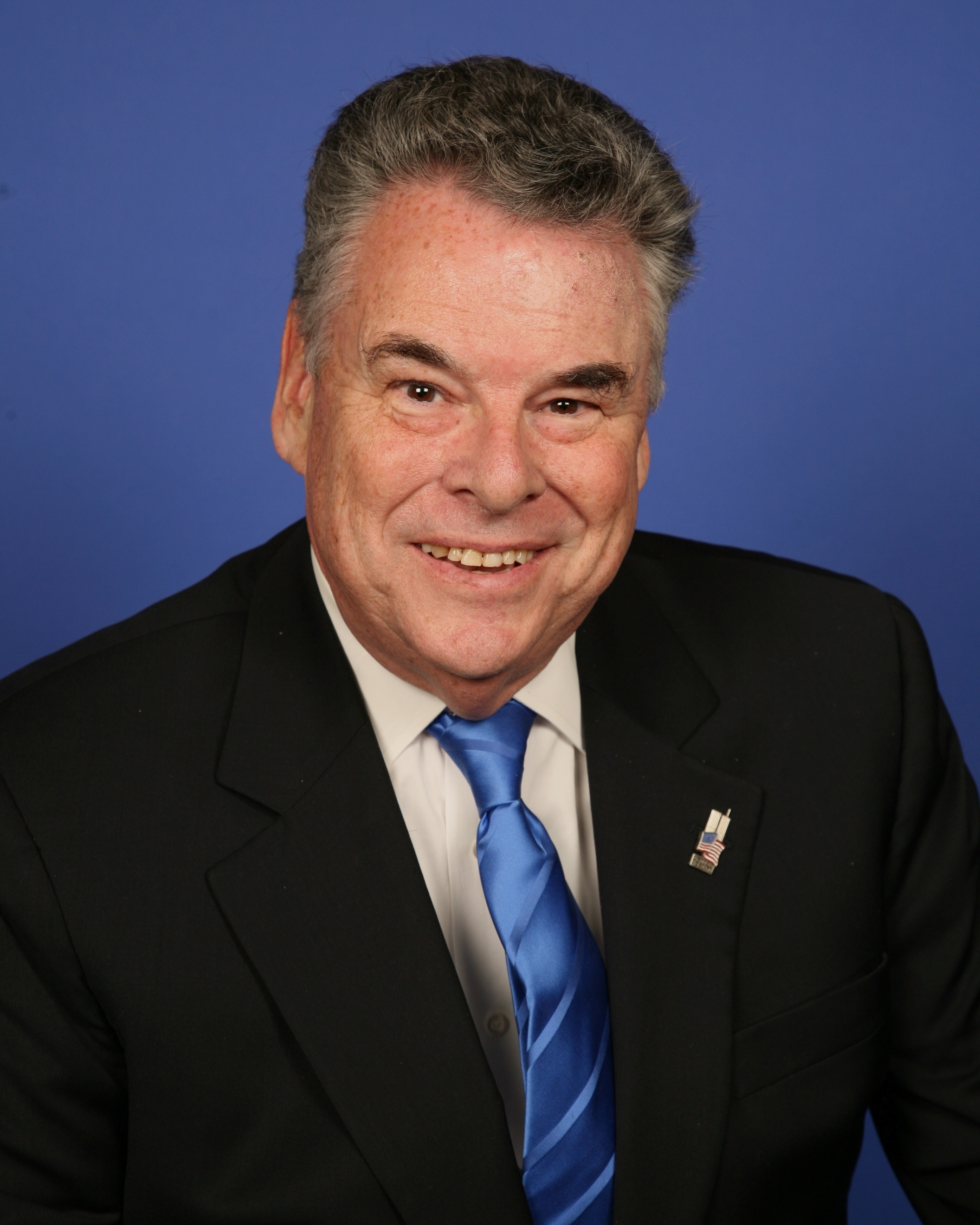

Nominee	Peter T. King	Dal Lamagna
Party	Republican	Democratic
Popular vote	143,126	95,787
Percentage	59.5%	39.8%
- County results King: 50–60%
U.S. Representative before election
Peter T. King
Republican
Elected U.S. Representative
Peter T. King
Republican

Incumbent Republican Peter T. King, who was first elected in 1992, ran for re-election. King was re-elected with 59.5% of the vote.

=== General election ===
==== Results ====
New York's 3rd congressional district election, 2000
Party	Candidate	Votes	%
Republican	Peter T. King (incumbent)	143,126	59.5
Democratic	Dal Lamagna	95,787	39.8
Libertarian	Selma Olchin	1,515	0.6
Total votes		240,428	100.0
Republican hold			

== District 4 ==
2000 New York's 4th congressional district election
- November 7, 2000
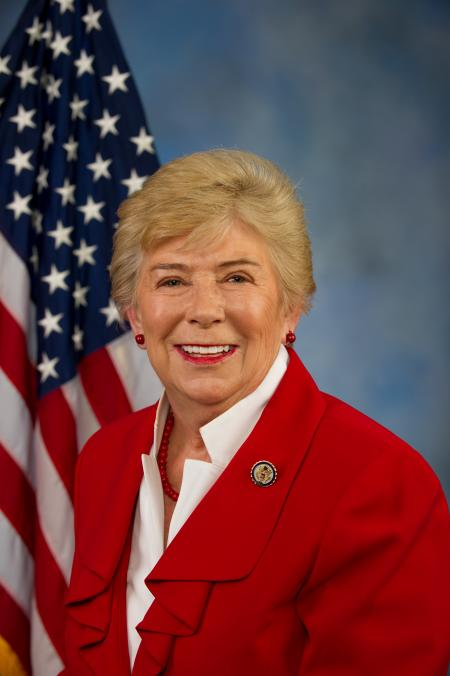

Nominee	Carolyn McCarthy	Gregory R. Becker
Party	Democratic	Republican
Popular vote	136,703	87,830
Percentage	60.6%	38.9%
- County results Mccarthy: 60–70%
U.S. Representative before election
Carolyn McCarthy
Democratic
Elected U.S. Representative
Carolyn McCarthy
Democratic

Incumbent Democrat Carolyn McCarthy, who was first elected in 1996, ran for re-election. McCarthy was re-elected with 60.6% of the vote.

=== General election ===
==== Results ====
New York's 4th congressional district election, 2000
Party	Candidate	Votes	%
Democratic	Carolyn McCarthy (incumbent)	136,703	60.6
Republican	Gregory R. Becker	87,830	38.9
Libertarian	Barbara Vitanza	1,222	0.5
Total votes		225,755	100.0
Democratic hold			

== District 5 ==
2000 New York's 5th congressional district election
- November 7, 2000
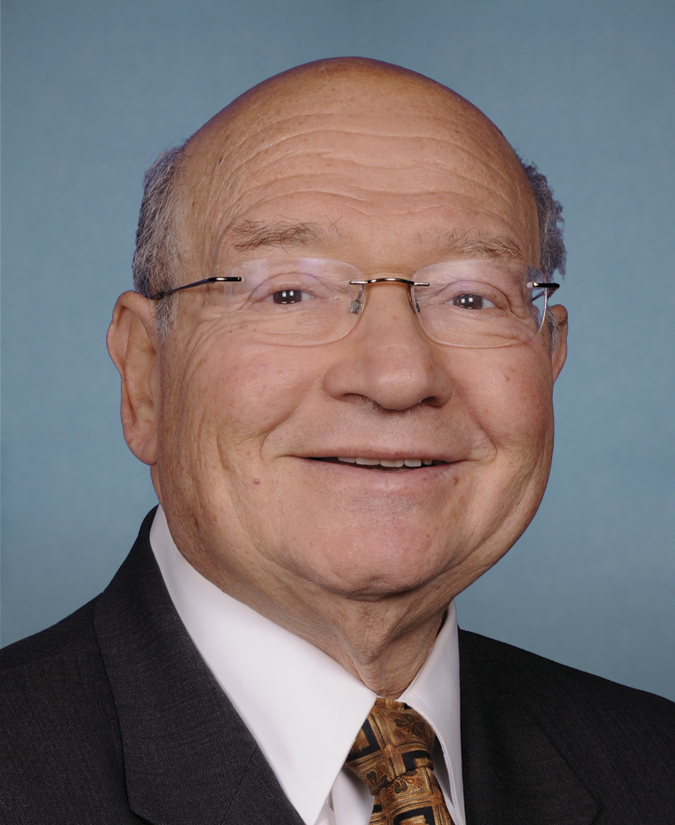

Nominee	Gary Ackerman	Edward Elkowitz
Party	Democratic	Republican
Popular vote	137,684	61,084
Percentage	68.0%	30.1%
- County results Ackerman: 50–60% 70–80%
U.S. Representative before election
Gary Ackerman
Democratic
Elected U.S. Representative
Gary Ackerman
Democratic

Incumbent Democrat Gary Ackerman, who was first elected in 1983, ran for re-election. Ackerman was re-elected with 68.0% of the vote.

=== General election ===
==== Results ====
New York's 5th congressional district election, 2000
Party	Candidate	Votes	%
Democratic	Gary Ackerman (incumbent)	137,684	68.0
Republican	Edward Elkowitz	61,084	30.1
Right to Life	Anne T. Robinson	3,846	1.9
Total votes		202,614	100.0
Democratic hold			

== District 6 ==
2000 New York's 6th congressional district election
- November 7, 2000
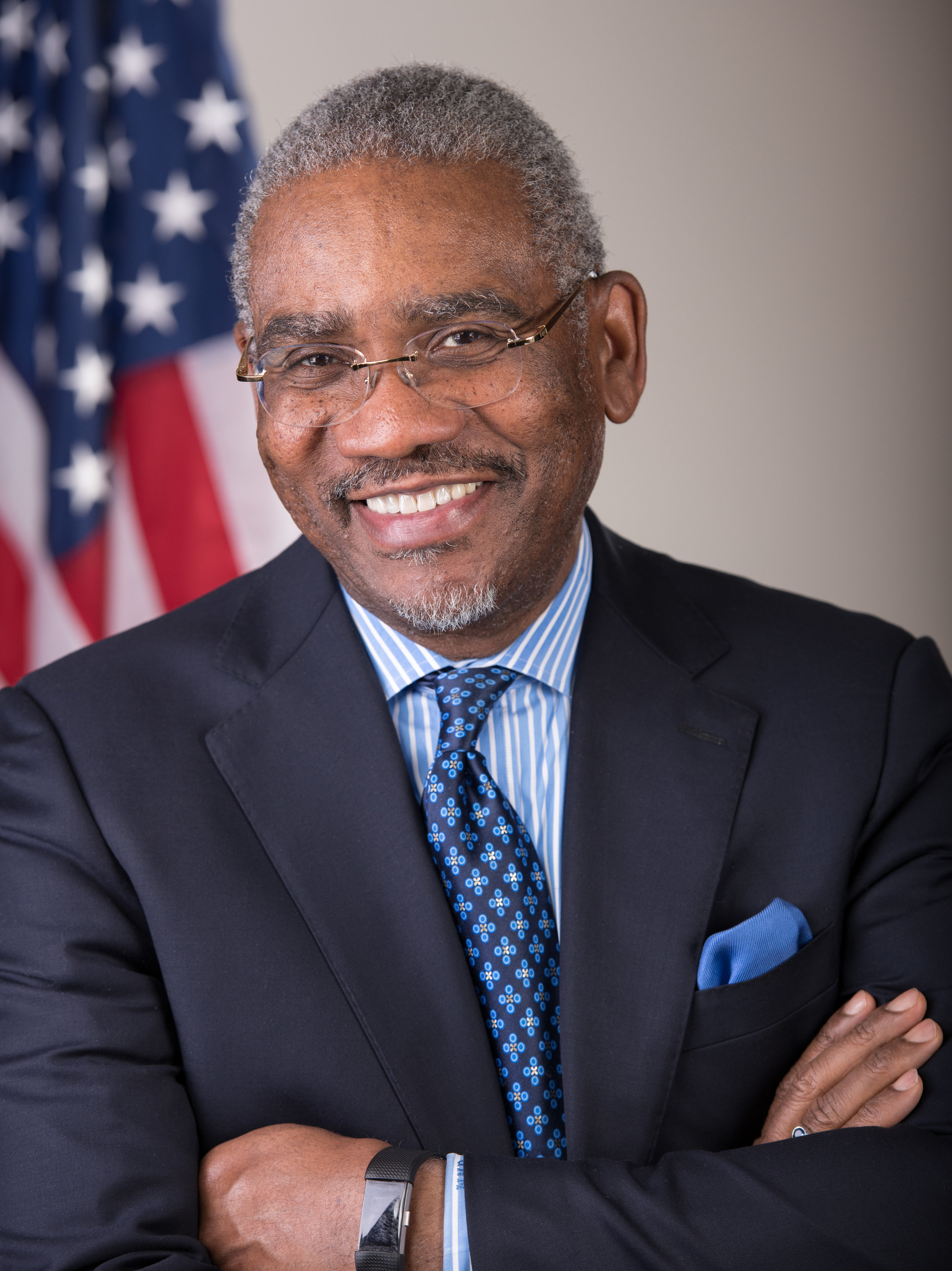
Nominee	Gregory W. Meeks
Party	Democratic
Popular vote	120,818
Percentage	100.0%
U.S. Representative before election
Gregory W. Meeks
Democratic
Elected U.S. Representative
Gregory W. Meeks
Democratic

Incumbent Democrat Gregory W. Meeks, who was first elected in 1998, ran for re-election. Meeks was re-elected unopposed.

=== General election ===
==== Results ====
New York's 6th congressional district election, 2000
Party	Candidate	Votes	%
Democratic	Gregory W. Meeks (incumbent)	120,818	100.0
Total votes		120,818	100.0
Democratic hold			

== District 7 ==
2000 New York's 7th congressional district election
- November 7, 2000
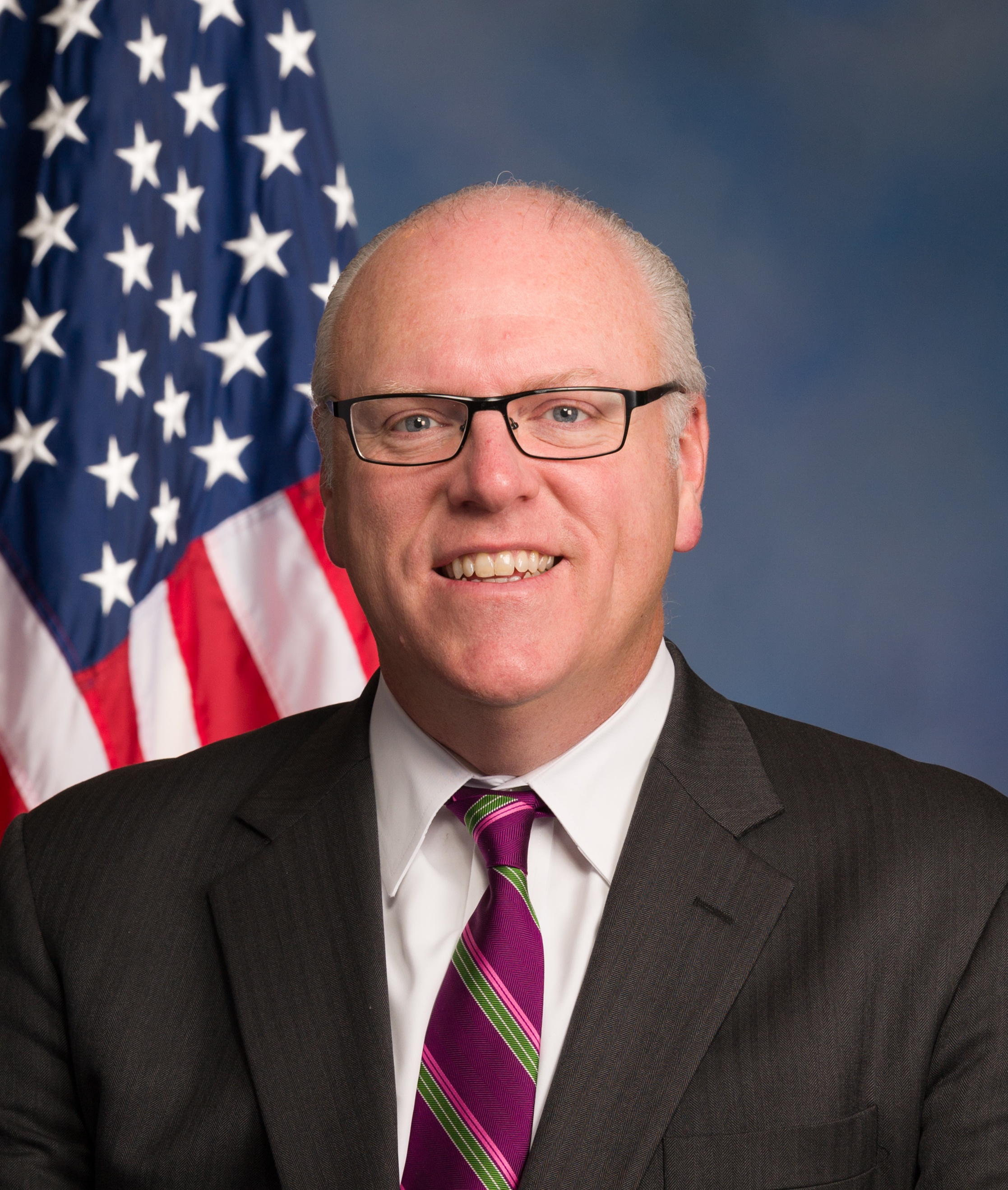

Nominee	Joseph Crowley	Rose Birtley
Party	Democratic	Republican
Popular vote	78,207	24,592
Percentage	71.7%	22.5%
- County results Crowley: 60–70% 70–80%
U.S. Representative before election
Joseph Crowley
Democratic
Elected U.S. Representative
Joseph Crowley
Democratic

Incumbent Democrat Joseph Crowley, who was first elected in 1998, ran for re-election. Crowley was re-elected with 71.7% of the vote.

=== General election ===
==== Results ====
New York's 7th congressional district election, 2000
Party	Candidate	Votes	%
Democratic	Joseph Crowley (incumbent)	78,207	71.7
Republican	Rose Birtley	24,592	22.5
Conservative	Robert E. Hurley	3,131	2.9
Green	Paul Gilman	1,999	1.8
Right to Life	Garafalia Christea	1,172	1.1
Total votes		109,101	100.0
Democratic hold			

== District 8 ==
2000 New York's 8th congressional district election
- November 7, 2000
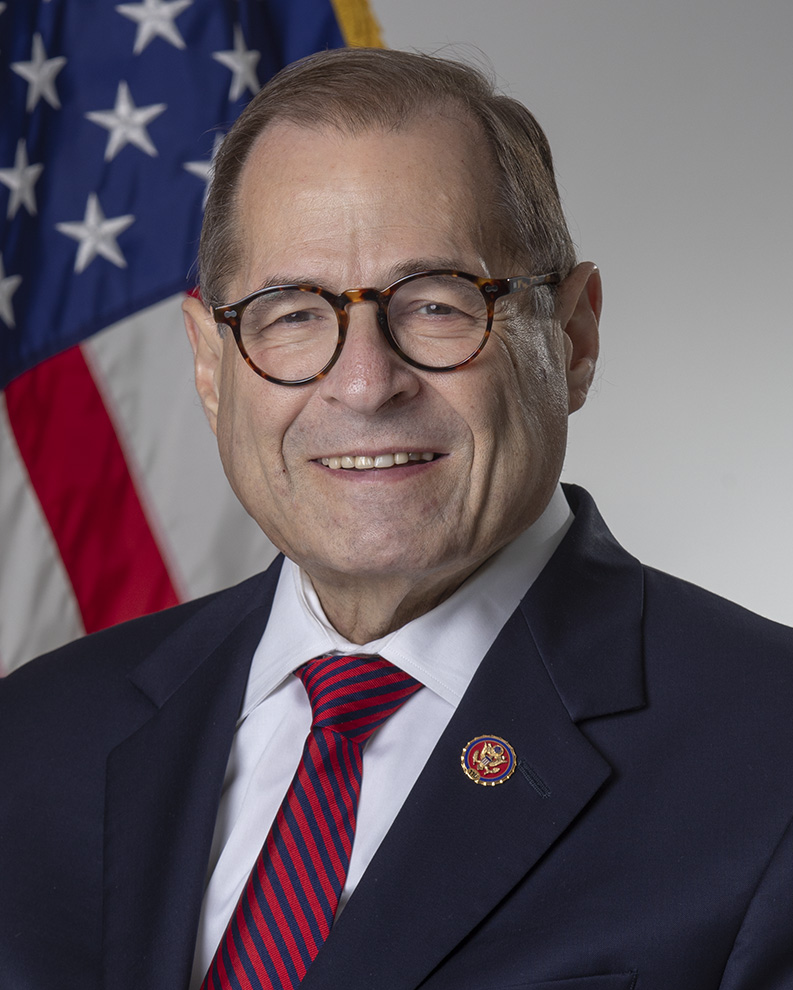

Nominee	Jerrold Nadler	Marian Henry
Party	Democratic	Republican
Popular vote	150,291	27,057
Percentage	81.2%	14.6%
- County results Nadler: 70–80% 80–90%
U.S. Representative before election
Jerrold Nadler
Democratic
Elected U.S. Representative
Jerrold Nadler
Democratic

Incumbent Democrat Jerrold Nadler, who was first elected in 1992, ran for re-election. Nadler was re-elected with 81.2% of the vote.

=== General election ===
==== Results ====
New York's 8th congressional district election, 2000
Party	Candidate	Votes	%
Democratic	Jerrold Nadler (incumbent)	150,291	81.2
Republican	Marian Henry	27,057	14.6
Green	Dan Wentzel	4,765	2.6
Conservative	Anthony A. LaBella	1,849	1.0
Independence	Harry Kresky	1,025	0.6
Total votes		184,987	100.0
Democratic hold			

== District 9 ==
2000 New York's 9th congressional district election
- November 7, 2000
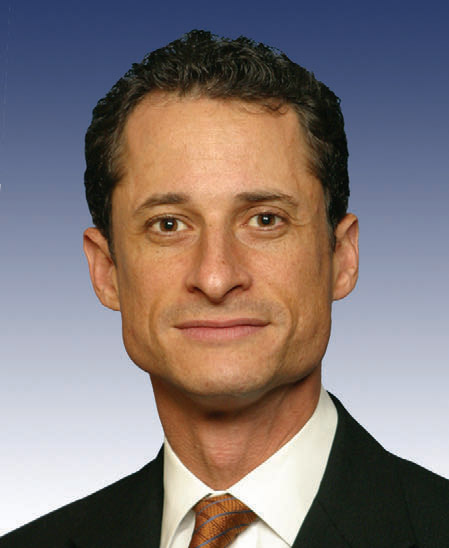

Nominee	Anthony Weiner	Noach Dear
Party	Democratic	Republican
Popular vote	98,983	45,649
Percentage	68.4%	31.6%
- County results Weiner: 60–70%
U.S. Representative before election
Anthony Weiner
Democratic
Elected U.S. Representative
Anthony Weiner
Democratic

Incumbent Democrat Anthony Weiner, who was first elected in 1998, ran for re-election. Weiner was re-elected with 68.4% of the vote.

=== General election ===
==== Results ====
New York's 9th congressional district election, 2000
Party	Candidate	Votes	%
Democratic	Anthony Weiner (incumbent)	98,983	68.4
Republican	Noach Dear	45,649	31.6
Total votes		144,632	100.0
Democratic hold			

== District 10 ==
2000 New York's 10th congressional district election
- November 7, 2000
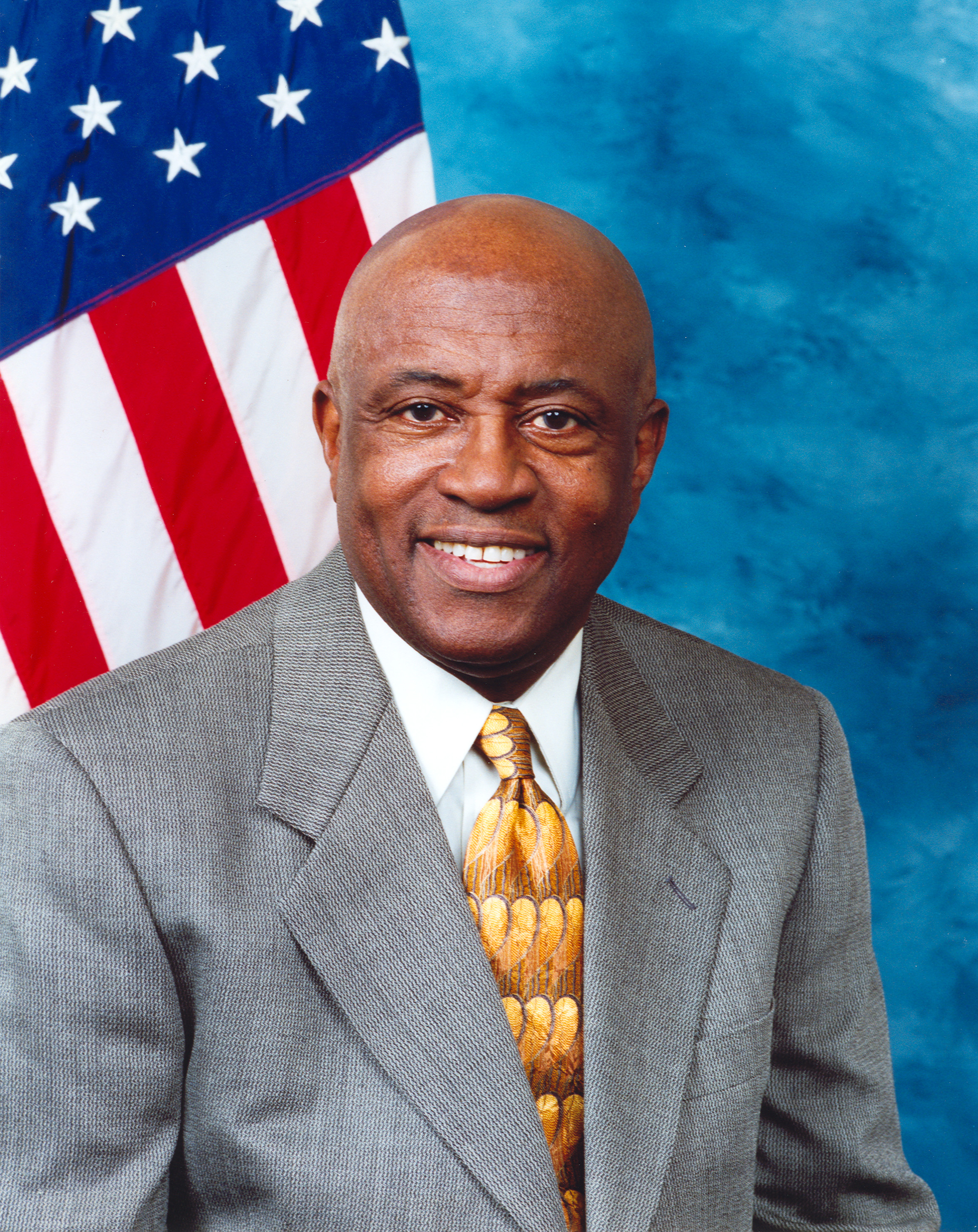

Nominee	Edolphus Towns	Ernestine Brown
Party	Democratic	Republican
Popular vote	120,700	6,852
Percentage	90.2%	5.1%
- County results Towns: 90–100%
U.S. Representative before election
Edolphus Towns
Democratic
Elected U.S. Representative
Edolphus Towns
Democratic

Incumbent Democrat Edolphus Towns, who was first elected in 1982, ran for re-election. Towns was re-elected with 90.2% of the vote.

=== General election ===
==== Results ====
New York's 10th congressional district election, 2000
Party	Candidate	Votes	%
Democratic	Edolphus Towns (incumbent)	120,700	90.2
Republican	Ernestine Brown	6,852	5.1
Working Families	Barry Ford	5,530	4.1
Conservative	Ernest Johnson	802	0.6
Total votes		133,884	100.0
Democratic hold			

== District 11 ==
2000 New York's 11th congressional district election
- November 7, 2000
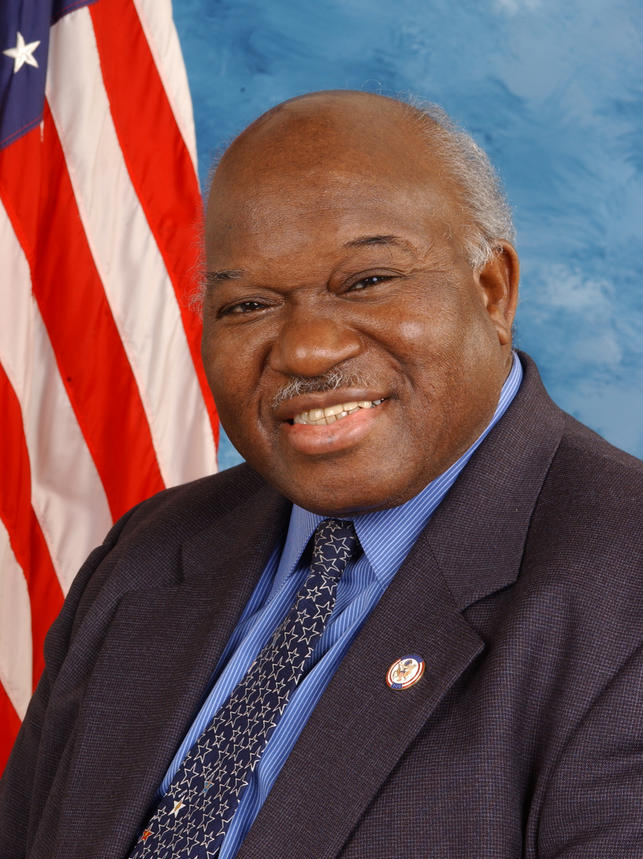

Nominee	Major Owens	Susan Cleary
Party	Democratic	Republican
Popular vote	112,050	8,406
Percentage	87.0%	6.5%
- County results Owens: 80–90%
U.S. Representative before election
Major Owens
Democratic
Elected U.S. Representative
Major Owens
Democratic

Incumbent Democrat Major Owens, who was first elected in 1982, ran for re-election. Owens was re-elected with 87.0% of the vote.

=== General election ===
==== Results ====
New York's 11th congressional district election, 2000
Party	Candidate	Votes	%
Democratic	Major Owens (incumbent)	112,050	87.0
Republican	Susan Cleary	8,406	6.5
Liberal	Una S. T. Clarke	7,366	5.7
Conservative	Cartrell Gore	962	0.7
Total votes		128,784	100.0
Democratic hold			

== District 12 ==
2000 New York's 12th congressional district election
- November 7, 2000
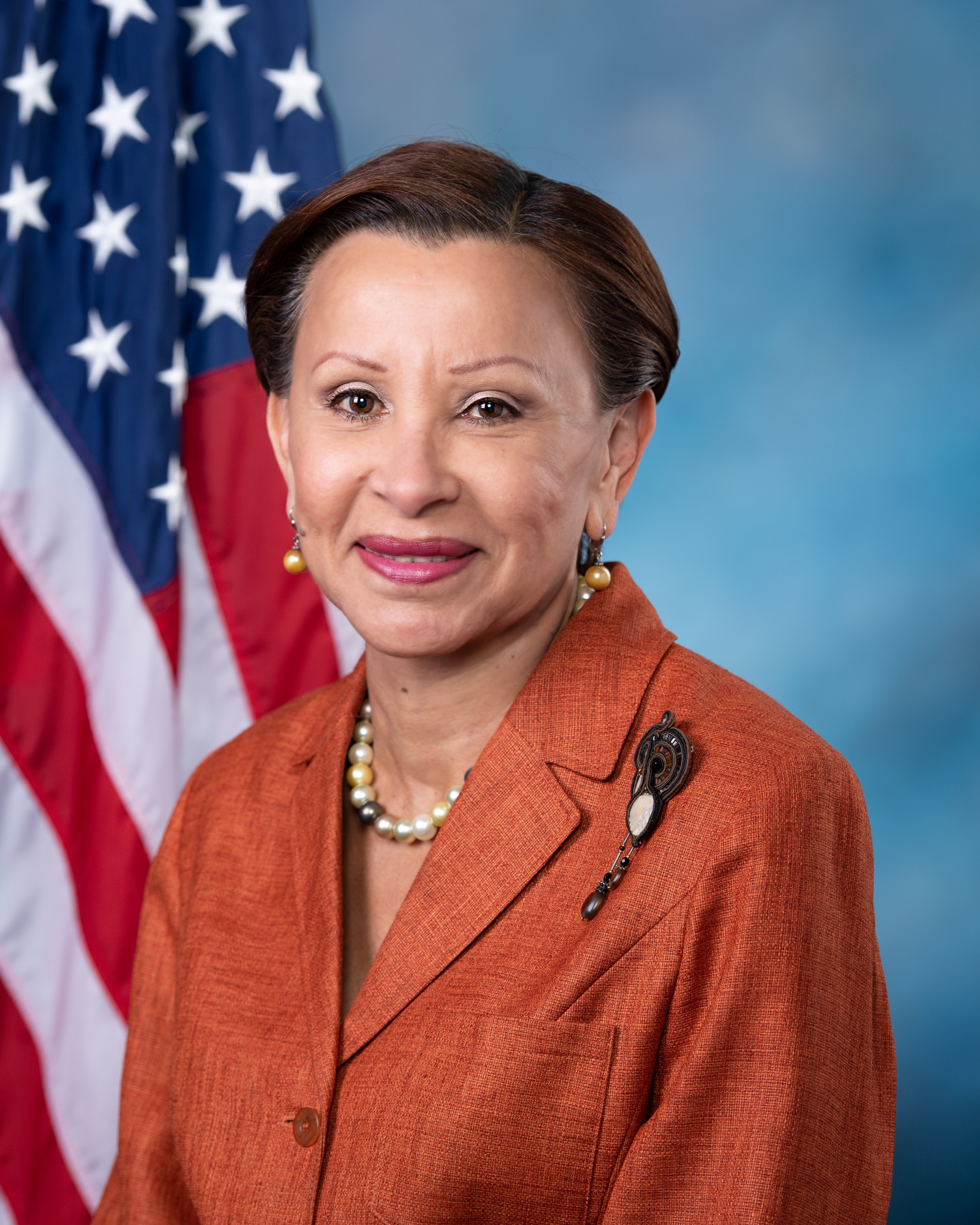

Nominee	Nydia Velázquez	Rosemarie Markgraf
Party	Democratic	Republican
Popular vote	86,288	10,052
Percentage	87.1%	10.1%
U.S. Representative before election
Nydia Velázquez
Democratic
Elected U.S. Representative
Nydia Velázquez
Democratic

Incumbent Democrat Nydia Velázquez, who was first elected in 1992, ran for re-election. Velázquez was re-elected with 87.1% of the vote.

=== General election ===
==== Results ====
New York's 12th congressional district election, 2000
Party	Candidate	Votes	%
Democratic	Nydia Velázquez (incumbent)	86,288	87.1
Republican	Rosemarie Markgraf	10,052	10.1
Socialist Worker	Paul Pederson	1,025	1.0
Right to Life	Mildred Rosario	865	0.9
Conservative	Caesar Estevez	850	0.9
Total votes		99,080	100.0
Democratic hold			

== District 13 ==
2000 New York's 13th congressional district election
- November 7, 2000
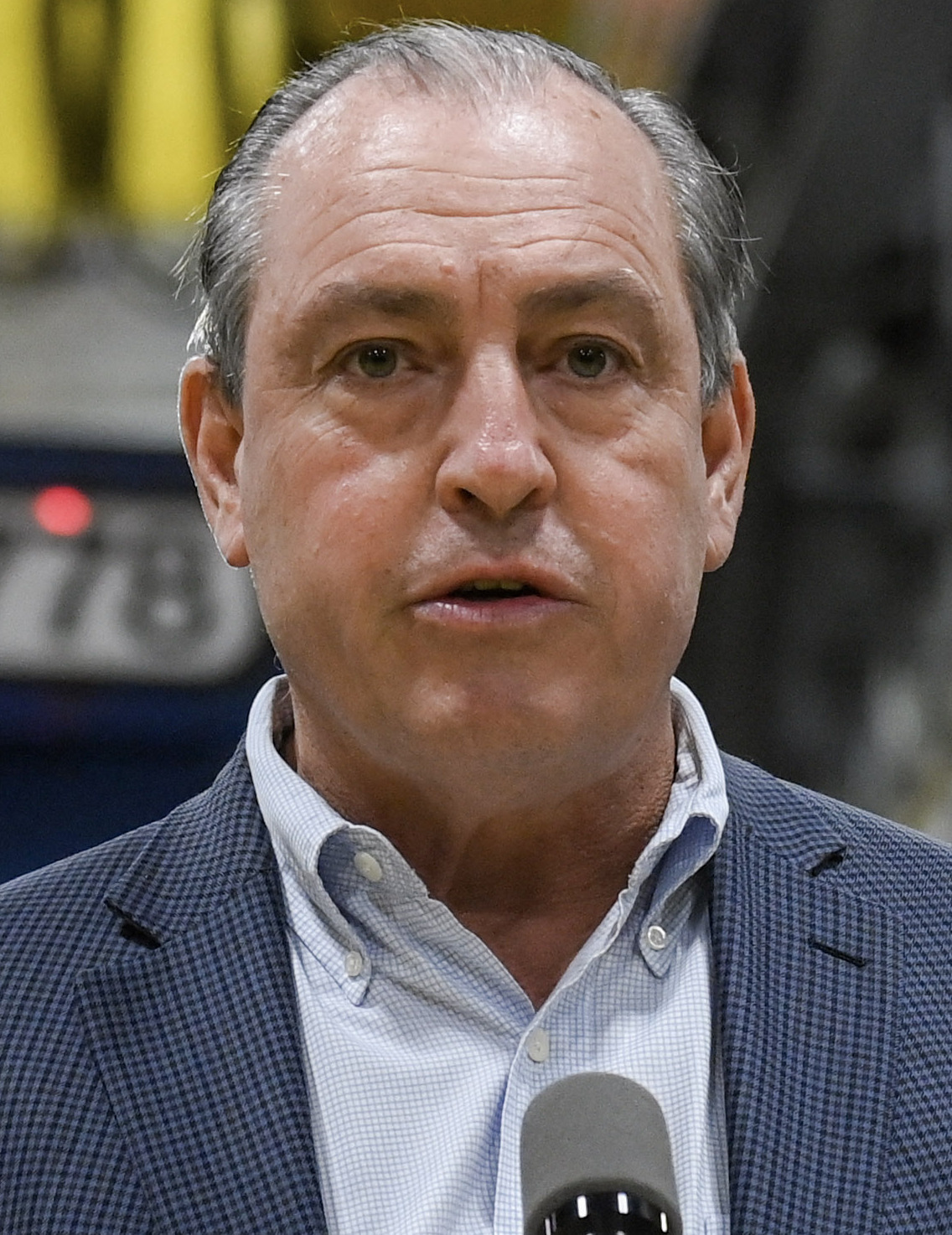

Nominee	Vito Fossella	Katina Johnstone
Party	Republican	Democratic
Popular vote	109,806	57,603
Percentage	64.6%	33.9%
- County results Fossella: 50–60% 60–70%
U.S. Representative before election
Vito Fossella
Republican
Elected U.S. Representative
Vito Fossella
Republican

Incumbent Republican Vito Fossella, who was first elected in 1997, ran for re-election. Fossella was re-elected with 64.6% of the vote.

=== General election ===
==== Results ====
New York's 13th congressional district election, 2000
Party	Candidate	Votes	%
Republican	Vito Fossella (incumbent)	109,806	64.6
Democratic	Katina Johnstone	57,603	33.9
Green	Anita Lerman	2,653	1.6
Total votes		170,062	100.0
Republican hold			

== District 14 ==
2000 New York's 14th congressional district election
- November 7, 2000
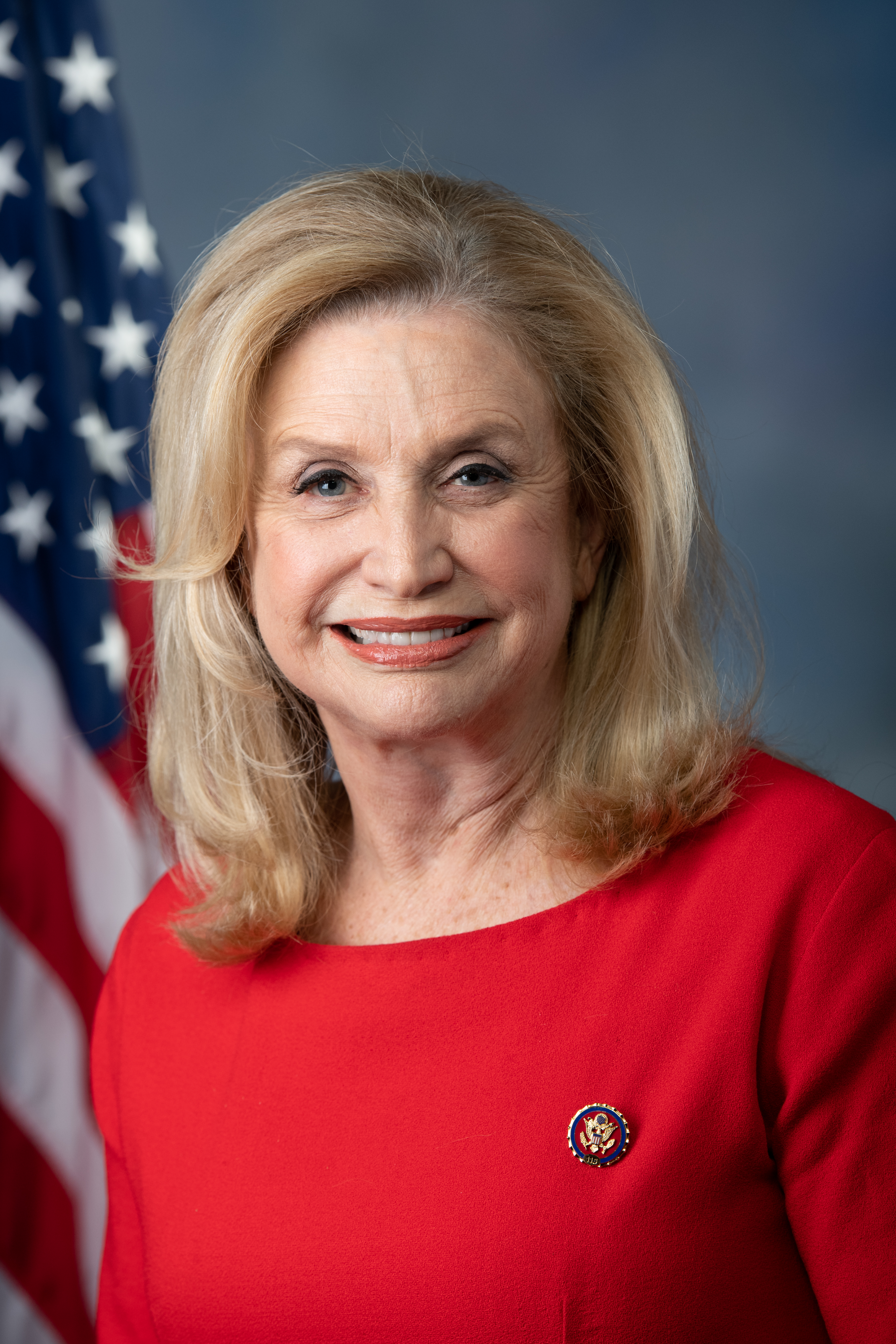

Nominee	Carolyn Maloney	C. Adrienne Rhodes
Party	Democratic	Republican
Popular vote	148,080	45,453
Percentage	73.9%	22.7%
- County results Maloney: 70–80%
U.S. Representative before election
Carolyn Maloney
Democratic
Elected U.S. Representative
Carolyn Maloney
Democratic

Incumbent Democrat Carolyn Maloney, who was first elected in 1992, ran for re-election. Maloney was re-elected with 73.9% of the vote.

=== General election ===
==== Results ====
New York's 14th congressional district election, 2000
Party	Candidate	Votes	%
Democratic	Carolyn Maloney (incumbent)	148,080	73.9
Republican	C. Adrienne Rhodes	45,453	22.7
Green	Sandra Stevens	4,869	2.4
Independence	Frederick D. Newman	1,946	1.0
Total votes		200,348	100.0
Democratic hold			

== District 15 ==
2000 New York's 15th congressional district election
- November 7, 2000
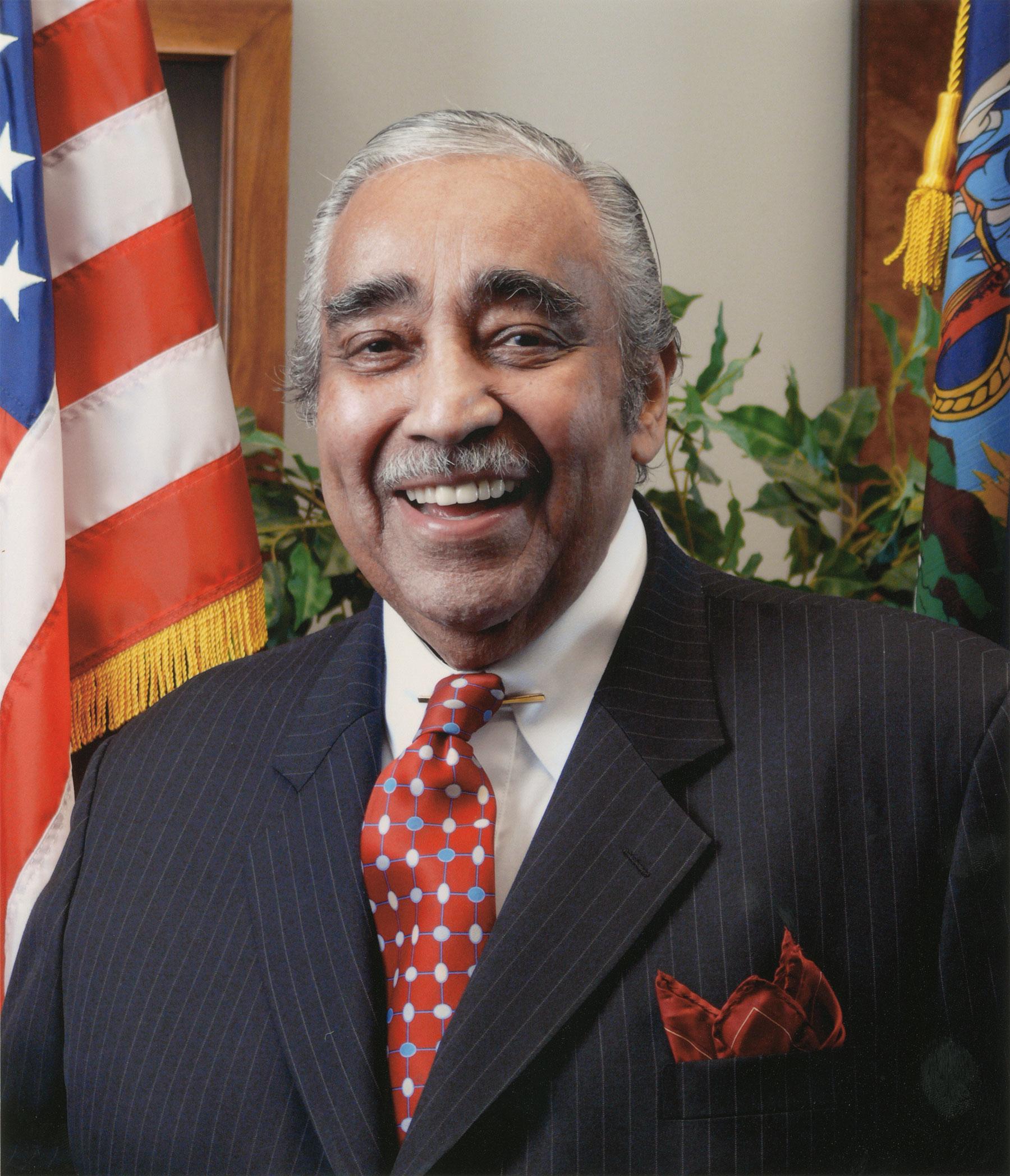

Nominee	Charles B. Rangel	Jose Augustin Suero
Party	Democratic	Republican
Popular vote	130,161	7,346
Percentage	91.9%	5.2%
U.S. Representative before election
Charles B. Rangel
Democratic
Elected U.S. Representative
Charles B. Rangel
Democratic

Incumbent Democrat Charles B. Rangel, who was first elected in 1970, ran for re-election. Rangel was re-elected with 91.9% of the vote.

=== General election ===
==== Results ====
New York's 15th congressional district election, 2000
Party	Candidate	Votes	%
Democratic	Charles B. Rangel (incumbent)	130,161	91.9
Republican	Jose Augustin Suero	7,346	5.2
Green	Dean Loren	2,134	1.5
Independence	Jessie A. Fields	1,051	0.7
Conservative	Frank Della Valle	492	0.3
Libertarian	Scott A. Jeffery	480	0.3
Total votes		141,664	100.0
Democratic hold			

== District 16 ==
2000 New York's 16th congressional district election
- November 7, 2000
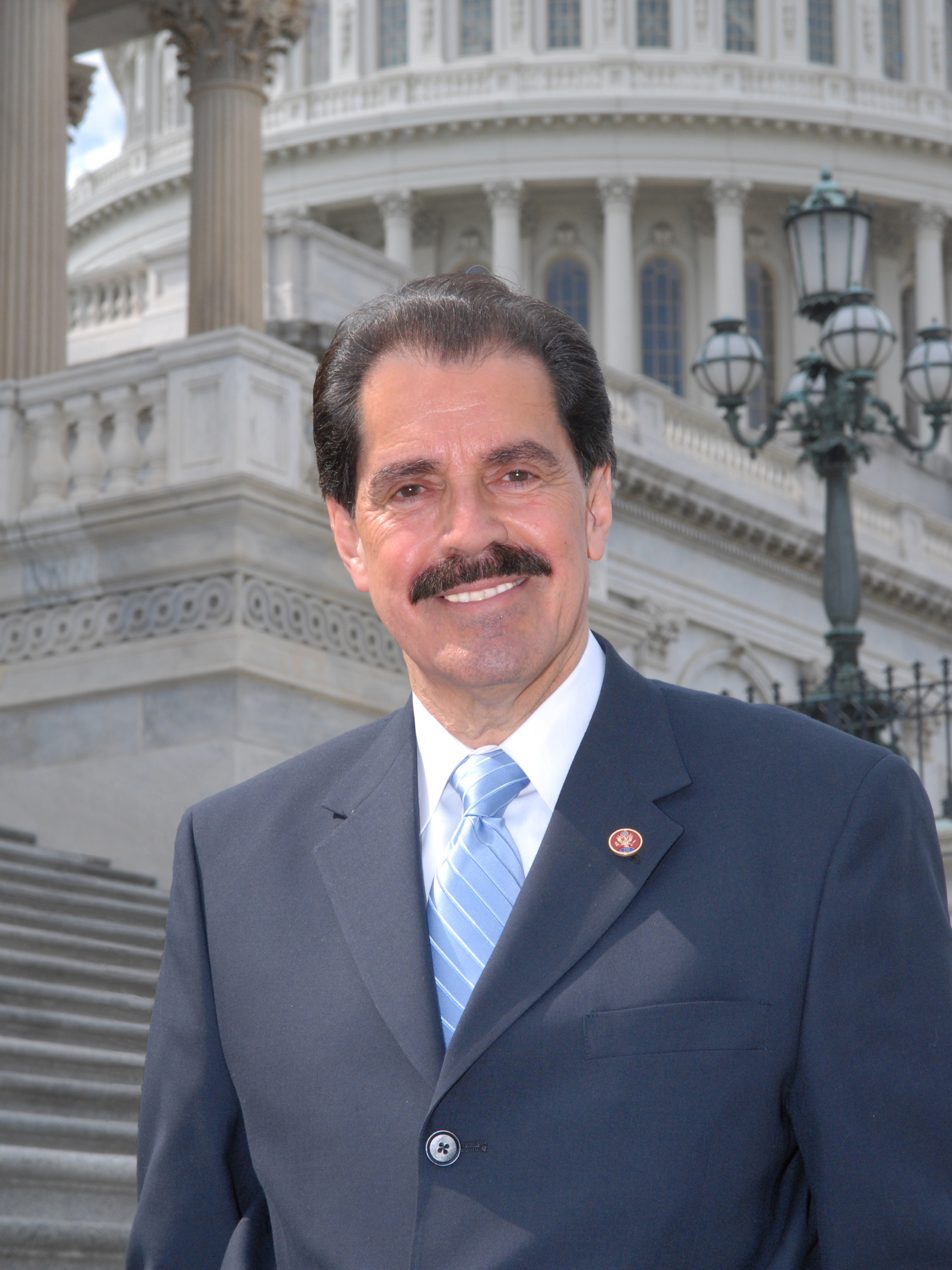

Nominee	José E. Serrano	Aaron Justice
Party	Democratic	Republican
Popular vote	103,041	3,943
Percentage	95.8%	3.7%
- County results Serrano: 90–100%
U.S. Representative before election
José E. Serrano
Democratic
Elected U.S. Representative
José E. Serrano
Democratic

Incumbent Democrat José E. Serrano, who was first elected in 1990, ran for re-election. Serrano was re-elected with 95.8% of the vote.

=== General election ===
==== Results ====
New York's 16th congressional district election, 2000
Party	Candidate	Votes	%
Democratic	José E. Serrano (incumbent)	103,041	95.8
Republican	Aaron Justice	3,943	3.7
Conservative	Richard Retcho	571	0.5
Total votes		107,555	100.0
Democratic hold			

== District 17 ==
2000 New York's 17th congressional district election
- November 7, 2000
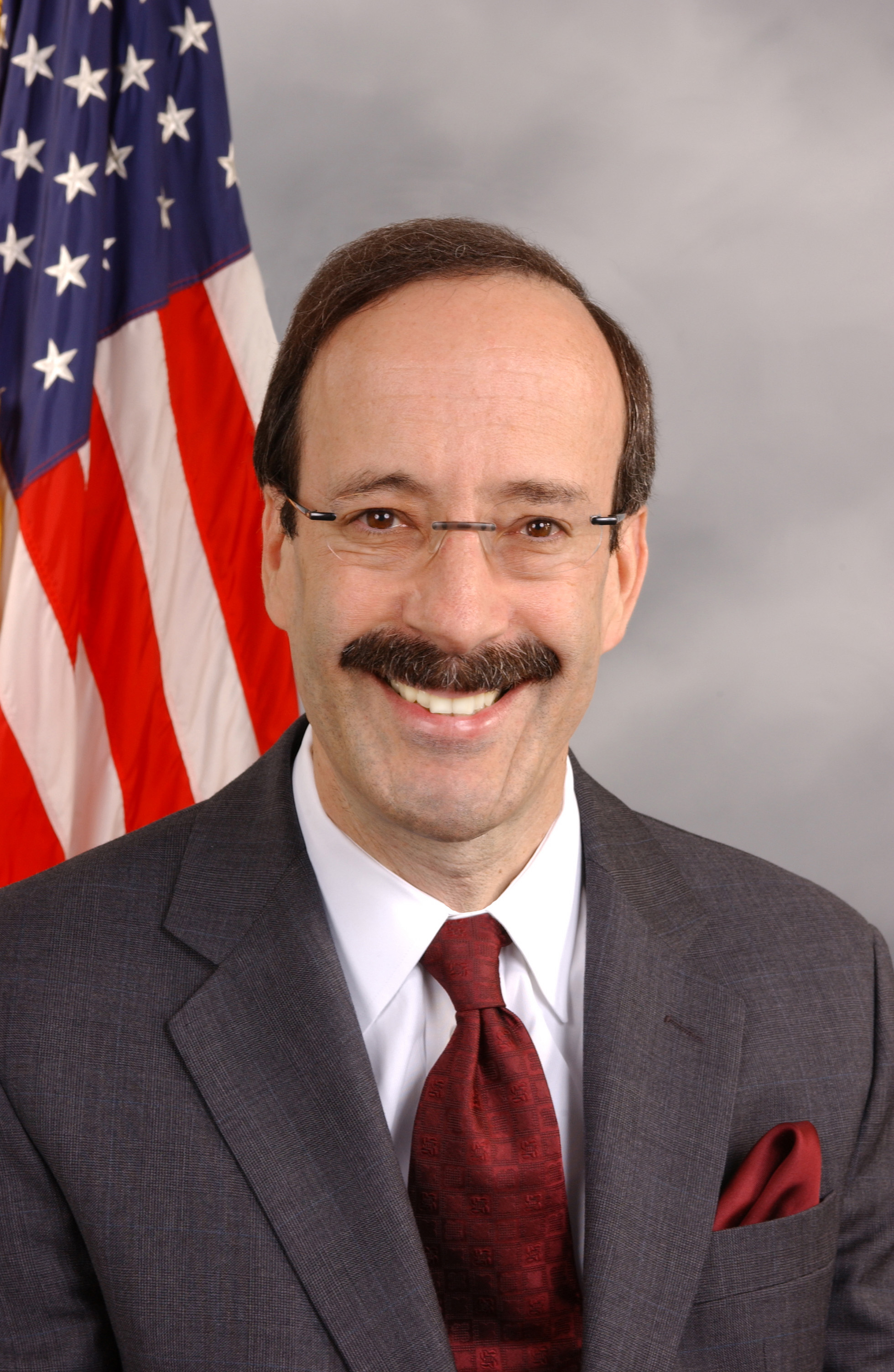

Nominee	Eliot Engel	Patrick McManus
Party	Democratic	Republican
Popular vote	115,093	13,201
Percentage	89.7%	10.3%
- County results Engel: 80–90%
U.S. Representative before election
Eliot Engel
Democratic
Elected U.S. Representative
Eliot Engel
Democratic

Incumbent Democrat Eliot Engel, who was first elected in 1988, ran for re-election. Engel was re-elected with 89.7% of the vote.

=== General election ===
==== Results ====
New York's 17th congressional district election, 2000
Party	Candidate	Votes	%
Democratic	Eliot Engel (incumbent)	115,093	89.7
Republican	Patrick McManus	13,201	10.3
Total votes		128,294	100.0
Democratic hold			

== District 18 ==
2000 New York's 18th congressional district election
- November 7, 2000
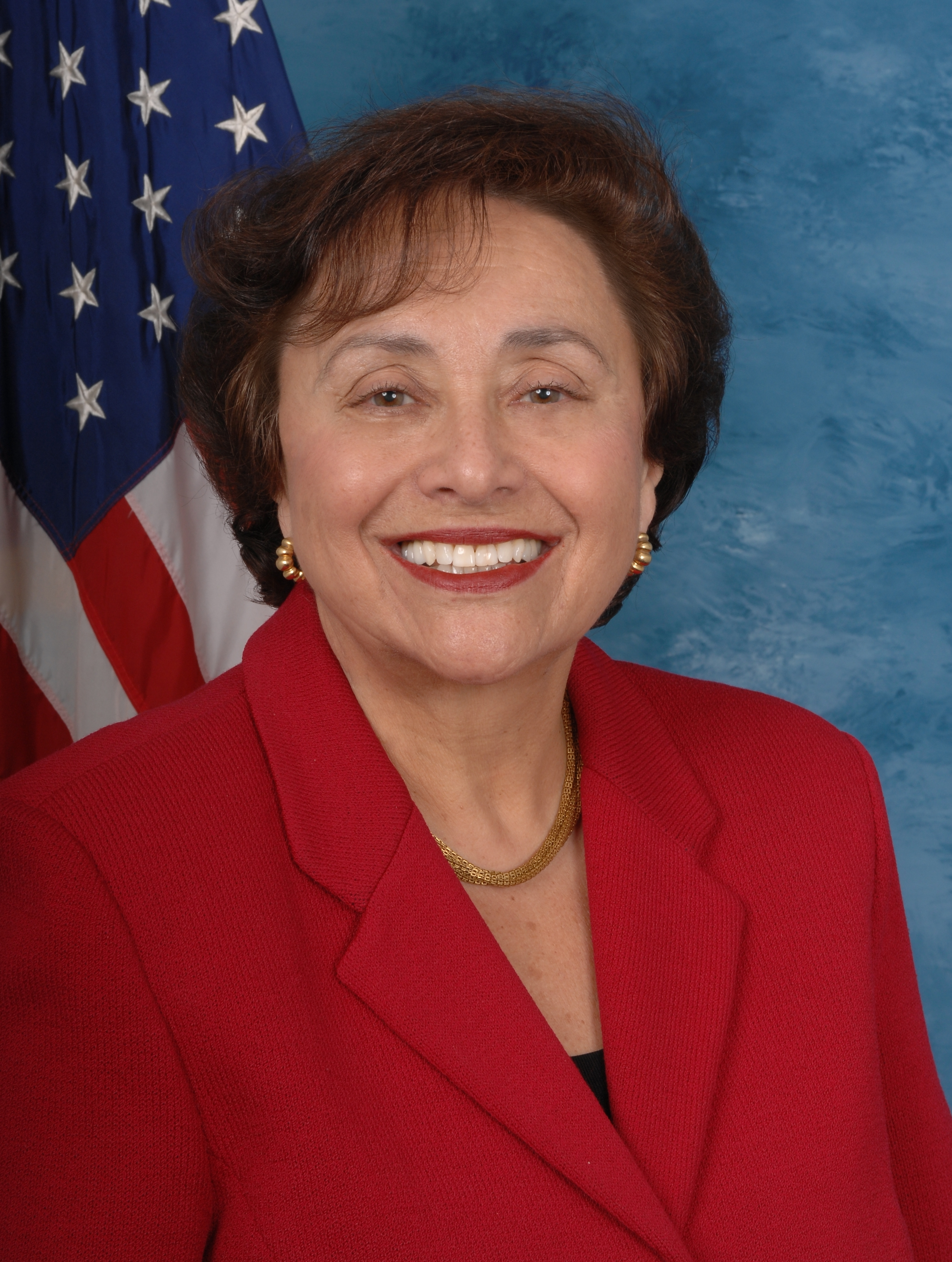

Nominee	Nita Lowey	John Vonglis
Party	Democratic	Republican
Popular vote	126,878	58,022
Percentage	67.3%	30.8%
- County results Lowey: 60–70% 70–80% Vonglis: 50–60%
U.S. Representative before election
Nita Lowey
Democratic
Elected U.S. Representative
Nita Lowey
Democratic

Incumbent Democrat Nita Lowey, who was first elected in 1988, ran for re-election. Lowey was re-elected with 67.3% of the vote.

=== General election ===
==== Results ====
New York's 18th congressional district election, 2000
Party	Candidate	Votes	%
Democratic	Nita Lowey (incumbent)	126,878	67.3
Republican	John Vonglis	58,022	30.8
Right to Life	Florence T. OGrady	3,747	2.0
Total votes		188,647	100.0
Democratic hold			

== District 19 ==
2000 New York's 19th congressional district election
- November 7, 2000
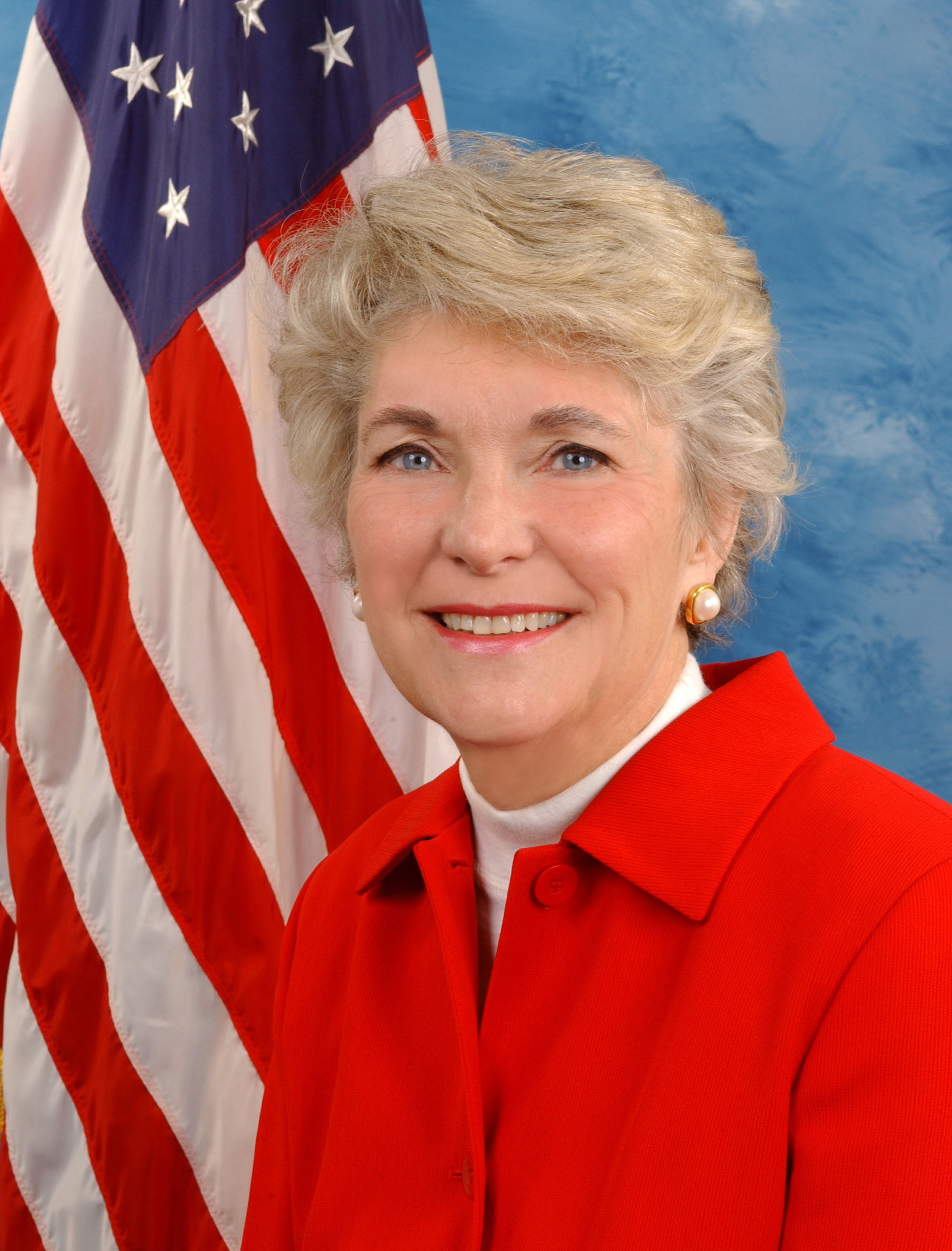

Nominee	Sue W. Kelly	Lawrence Otis Graham
Party	Republican	Democratic
Popular vote	145,532	85,871
Percentage	60.9%	35.9%
- County results Kelly: 50–60% 60–70%
U.S. Representative before election
Sue W. Kelly
Republican
Elected U.S. Representative
Sue W. Kelly
Republican

Incumbent Republican Sue W. Kelly, who was first elected in 1994, ran for re-election. Kelly was re-elected with 60.9% of the vote.

=== General election ===
==== Results ====
New York's 19th congressional district election, 2000
Party	Candidate	Votes	%
Republican	Sue W. Kelly (incumbent)	145,532	60.9
Democratic	Lawrence Otis Graham	85,871	35.9
Right to Life	Frank X. Lloyd	4,086	1.7
Green	Mark R. Jacobs	3,662	1.5
Total votes		239,151	100.0
Republican hold			

== District 20 ==
2000 New York's 20th congressional district election
- November 7, 2000
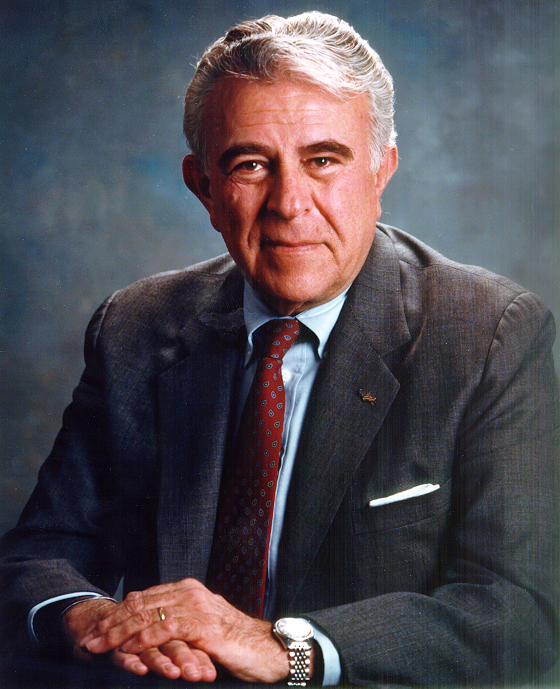

Nominee	Benjamin A. Gilman	Paul J. Feiner
Party	Republican	Democratic
Popular vote	136,016	94,646
Percentage	57.6%	40.1%
- County results Gilman: 50–60% 60–70% Feiner: 60–70%
U.S. Representative before election
Benjamin A. Gilman
Republican
Elected U.S. Representative
Benjamin A. Gilman
Republican

Incumbent Republican Benjamin A. Gilman, who was first elected in 1972, ran for re-election. Gilman was re-elected with 57.6% of the vote.

=== General election ===
==== Results ====
New York's 20th congressional district election, 2000
Party	Candidate	Votes	%
Republican	Benjamin A. Gilman (incumbent)	136,016	57.6
Democratic	Paul J. Feiner	94,646	40.1
Right to Life	Christine M. Tighe	5,371	2.3
Total votes		236,033	100.0
Republican hold			

== District 21 ==
2000 New York's 21st congressional district election
- November 7, 2000
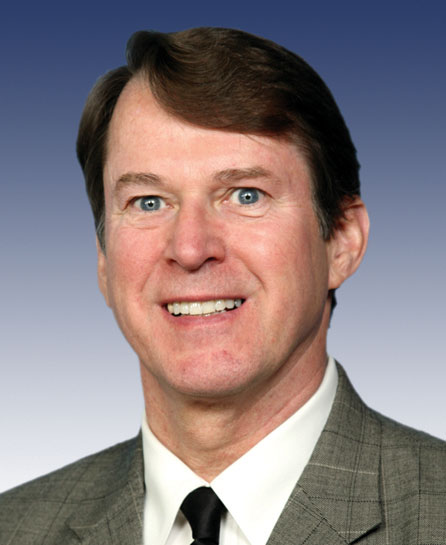

Nominee	Michael R. McNulty	Thomas Pillsworth
Party	Democratic	Republican
Popular vote	175,339	60,333
Percentage	74.4%	25.6%
- County results Mcnulty: 60–70% 70–80%
U.S. Representative before election
Michael R. McNulty
Democratic
Elected U.S. Representative
Michael R. McNulty
Democratic

Incumbent Democrat Michael R. McNulty, who was first elected in 1988, ran for re-election. McNulty was re-elected with 74.4% of the vote.

=== General election ===
==== Results ====
New York's 21st congressional district election, 2000
Party	Candidate	Votes	%
Democratic	Michael R. McNulty (incumbent)	175,339	74.4
Republican	Thomas Pillsworth	60,333	25.6
Total votes		235,672	100.0
Democratic hold			

== District 22 ==
2000 New York's 22nd congressional district election
- November 7, 2000
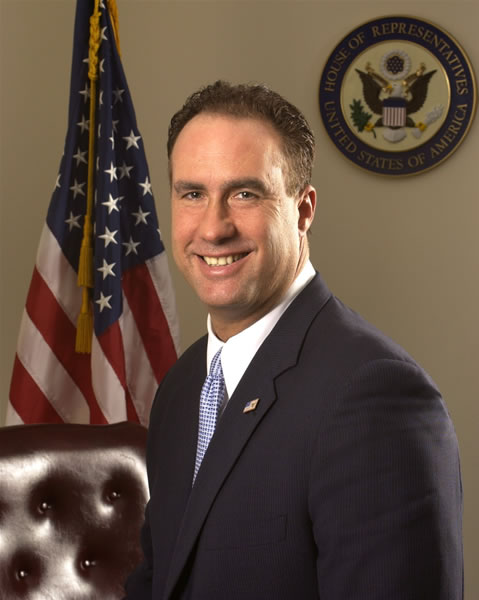

Nominee	John E. Sweeney	Kenneth McCallion
Party	Republican	Democratic
Popular vote	167,368	79,111
Percentage	67.9%	32.1%
U.S. Representative before election
John E. Sweeney
Republican
Elected U.S. Representative
John E. Sweeney
Republican

Incumbent Republican John E. Sweeney, who was first elected in 1998, ran for re-election. Sweeney was re-elected with 67.9% of the vote.

=== General election ===
==== Results ====
New York's 22nd congressional district election, 2000
Party	Candidate	Votes	%
Republican	John E. Sweeney (incumbent)	167,368	67.9
Democratic	Kenneth McCallion	79,111	32.1
Total votes		246,479	100.0
Republican hold			

== District 23 ==
2000 New York's 23rd congressional district election
- November 7, 2000
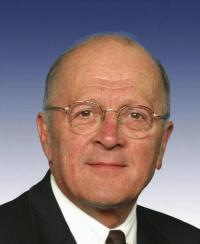

Nominee	Sherwood Boehlert	David B. Vickers
Party	Republican	Conservative
Popular vote	124,132	42,854
Percentage	60.5%	20.9%
- County results Boehlert: 40–50% 50–60% 60–70% 70–80%
U.S. Representative before election
Sherwood Boehlert
Republican
Elected U.S. Representative
Sherwood Boehlert
Republican

Incumbent Republican Sherwood Boehlert, who was first elected in 1982, ran for re-election. Boehlert was re-elected with 60.5% of the vote.

=== General election ===
==== Results ====
New York's 23rd congressional district election, 2000
Party	Candidate	Votes	%
Republican	Sherwood Boehlert (incumbent)	124,132	60.5
Conservative	David B. Vickers	42,854	20.9
Democratic	Richard Englebrecht	38,049	18.6
Total votes		205,035	100.0
Republican hold			

== District 24 ==
2000 New York's 24th congressional district election
- November 7, 2000
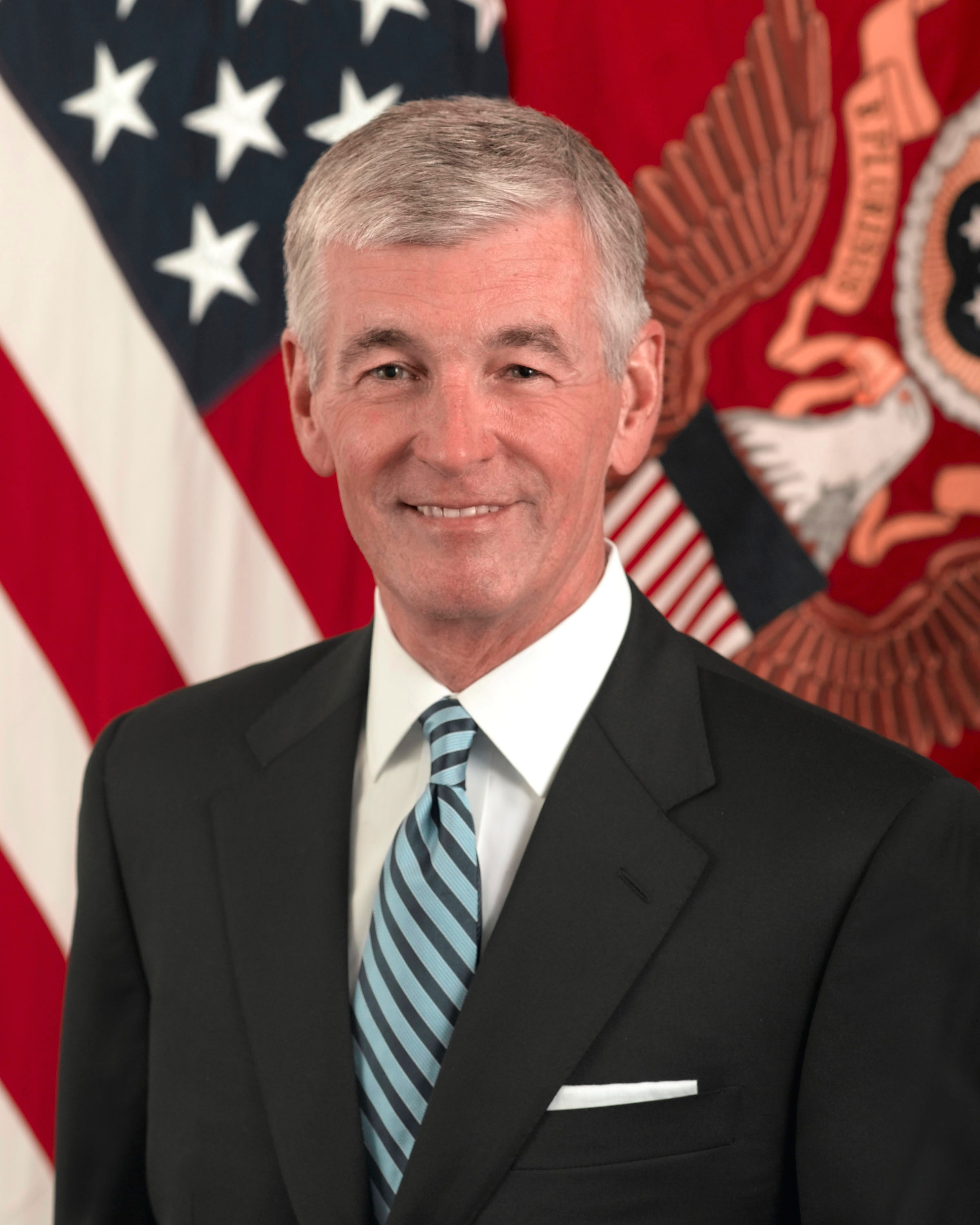

Nominee	John M. McHugh	Neil Tallon
Party	Republican	Democratic
Popular vote	138,322	42,698
Percentage	74.3%	22.9%
- County results Mchugh: 60–70% 70–80% 80–90%
U.S. Representative before election
John M. McHugh
Republican
Elected U.S. Representative
John M. McHugh
Republican

Incumbent Republican John M. McHugh, who was first elected in 1992, ran for re-election. McHugh was re-elected with 74.3% of the vote.

=== General election ===
==== Results ====
New York's 24th congressional district election, 2000
Party	Candidate	Votes	%
Republican	John M. McHugh (incumbent)	138,322	74.3
Democratic	Neil Tallon	42,698	22.9
Green	Willard E. Smith	5,167	2.8
Total votes		186,187	100.0
Republican hold			

== District 25 ==
2000 New York's 25th congressional district election
- November 7, 2000
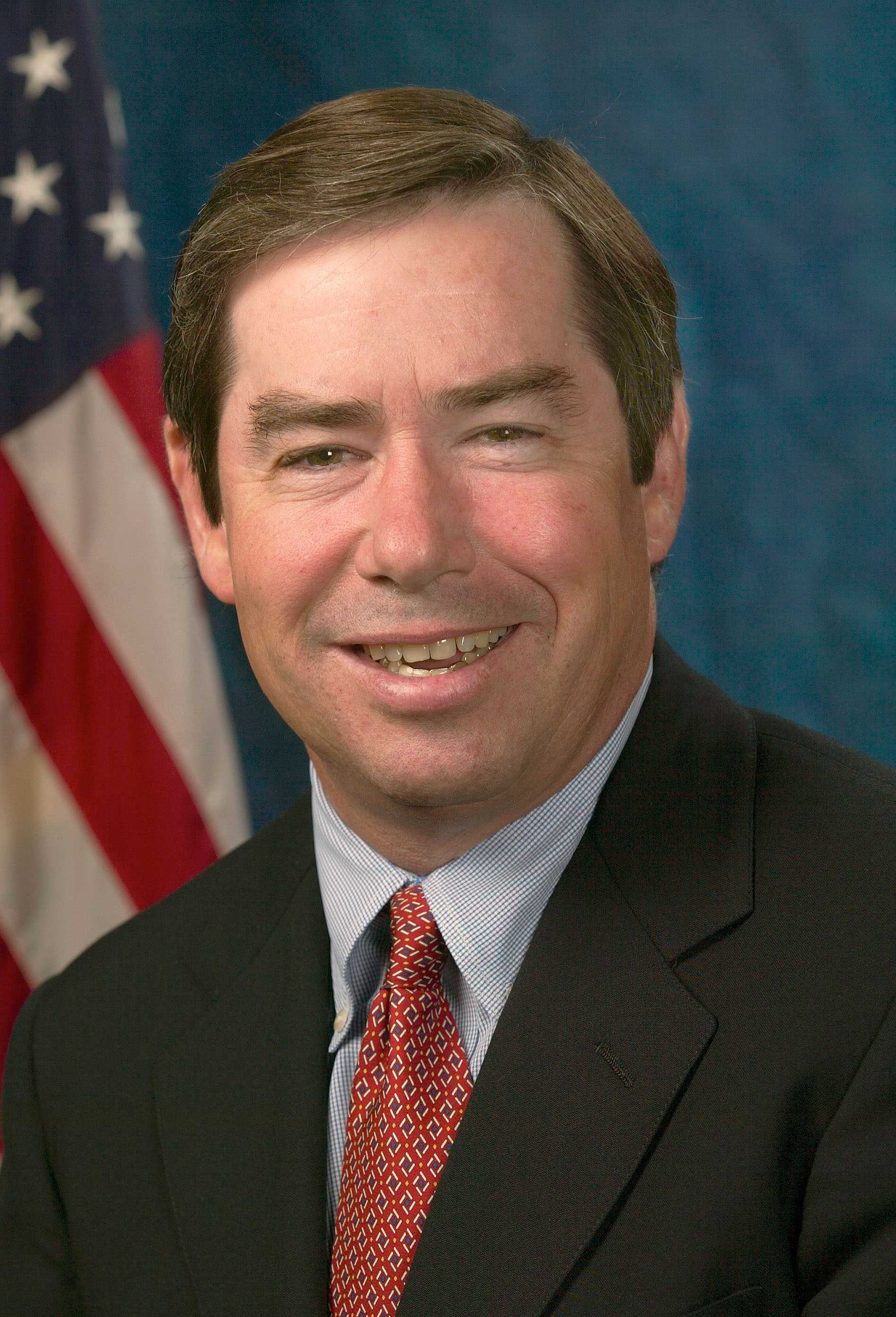

Nominee	James T. Walsh	Francis J. Gavin
Party	Republican	Democratic
Popular vote	151,880	64,533
Percentage	69.0%	29.3%
- County results Walsh: 60–70% 70–80%
U.S. Representative before election
James T. Walsh
Republican
Elected U.S. Representative
James T. Walsh
Republican

Incumbent Republican James T. Walsh, who was first elected in 1988, ran for re-election. Walsh was re-elected with 69.0% of the vote.

=== General election ===
==== Results ====
New York's 25th congressional district election, 2000
Party	Candidate	Votes	%
Republican	James T. Walsh (incumbent)	151,880	69.0
Democratic	Francis J. Gavin	64,533	29.3
Green	Howie Hawkins	3,830	1.7
Total votes		220,243	100.0
Republican hold			

== District 26 ==
2000 New York's 26th congressional district election
- November 7, 2000
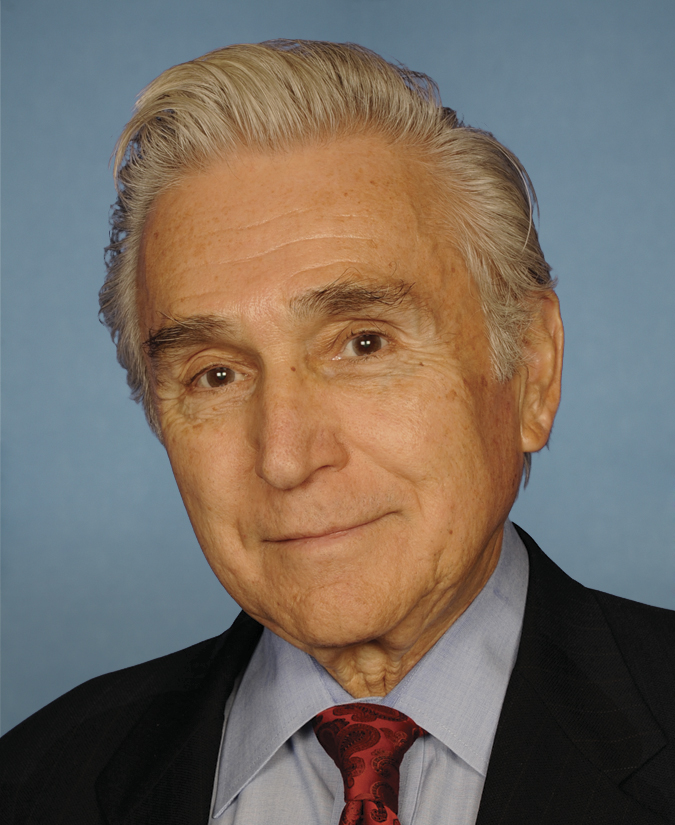

Nominee	Maurice Hinchey	Bob Moppert
Party	Democratic	Republican
Popular vote	140,395	83,856
Percentage	62.0%	37.0%
- County results Hinchey: 50–60% 60–70% 70–80% Moppert: 50–60%
U.S. Representative before election
Maurice Hinchey
Democratic
Elected U.S. Representative
Maurice Hinchey
Democratic

Incumbent Democrat Maurice Hinchey, who was first elected in 1992, ran for re-election. Hinchey was re-elected with 62.0% of the vote.

=== General election ===
==== Results ====
New York's 26th congressional district election, 2000
Party	Candidate	Votes	%
Democratic	Maurice Hinchey (incumbent)	140,395	62.0
Republican	Bob Moppert	83,856	37.0
Right to Life	Paul J. Laux	2,328	1.0
Total votes		226,579	100.0
Democratic hold			

== District 27 ==
2000 New York's 27th congressional district election
- November 7, 2000
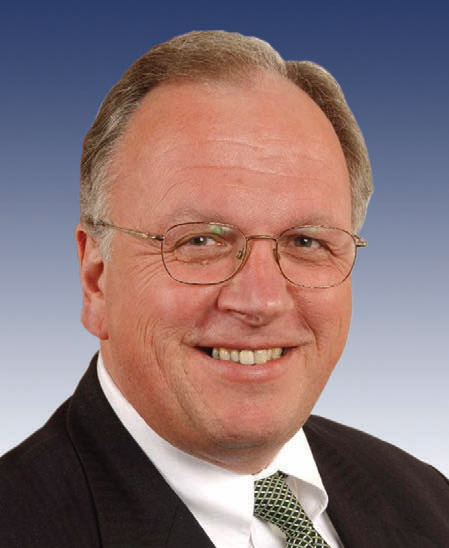

Nominee	Thomas M. Reynolds	Thomas Pecoraro
Party	Republican	Democratic
Popular vote	157,694	69,870
Percentage	69.3%	30.7%
- County results Reynolds: 60–70% 70–80% 80–90%
U.S. Representative before election
Thomas M. Reynolds
Republican
Elected U.S. Representative
Thomas M. Reynolds
Republican

Incumbent Republican Thomas M. Reynolds, who was first elected in 1998, ran for re-election. Reynolds was re-elected with 69.3% of the vote.

=== General election ===
==== Results ====
New York's 27th congressional district election, 2000
Party	Candidate	Votes	%
Republican	Thomas M. Reynolds (incumbent)	157,694	69.3
Democratic	Thomas Pecoraro	69,870	30.7
Total votes		227,564	100.0
Republican hold			

== District 28 ==
2000 New York's 28th congressional district election
- November 7, 2000
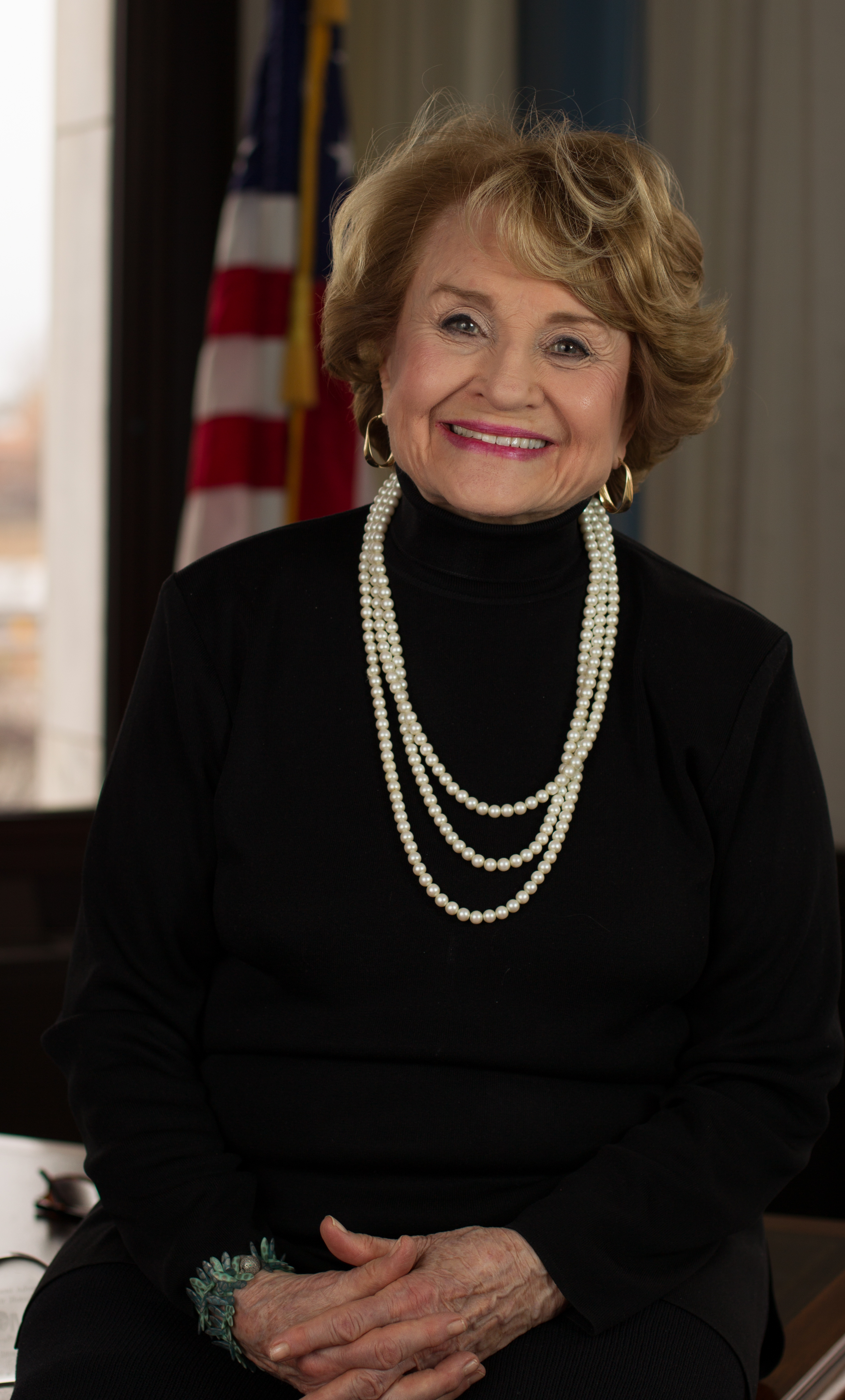

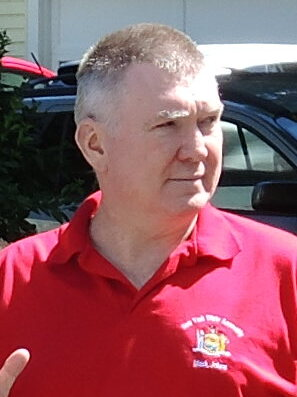
Nominee	Louise Slaughter	Mark Johns
Party	Democratic	Republican
Popular vote	151,688	75,348
Percentage	65.7%	32.6%
- County results Slaughter: 60–70%
U.S. Representative before election
Louise Slaughter
Democratic
Elected U.S. Representative
Louise Slaughter
Democratic

Incumbent Democrat Louise Slaughter, who was first elected in 1986, ran for re-election. Slaughter was re-elected with 65.7% of the vote.

=== General election ===
==== Results ====
New York's 28th congressional district election, 2000
Party	Candidate	Votes	%
Democratic	Louise Slaughter (incumbent)	151,688	65.7
Republican	Mark Johns	75,348	32.6
Green	Eve Hawkins	2,292	1.0
Libertarian	Stephen C. Healey	1,528	0.7
Total votes		230,856	100.0
Democratic hold			

== District 29 ==
2000 New York's 29th congressional district election
- November 7, 2000
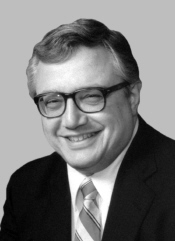

Nominee	John J. LaFalce	Brett Sommer
Party	Democratic	Republican
Popular vote	128,328	81,159
Percentage	61.3%	38.7%
- County results Lafalce: 50–60% 60–70%
U.S. Representative before election
John J. LaFalce
Democratic
Elected U.S. Representative
John J. LaFalce
Democratic

Incumbent Democrat John J. LaFalce, who was first elected in 1974, ran for re-election. LaFalce was re-elected with 61.3% of the vote.

=== General election ===
==== Results ====
New York's 29th congressional district election, 2000
Party	Candidate	Votes	%
Democratic	John J. LaFalce (incumbent)	128,328	61.3
Republican	Brett Sommer	81,159	38.7
Total votes		209,487	100.0
Democratic hold			

== District 30 ==
2000 New York's 30th congressional district election
- November 7, 2000
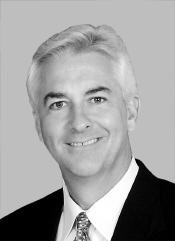

Nominee	Jack Quinn	John Fee
Party	Republican	Democratic
Popular vote	138,452	67,819
Percentage	67.1%	32.9%
- County results Quinn: 60–70%
U.S. Representative before election
Jack Quinn
Republican
Elected U.S. Representative
Jack Quinn
Republican

Incumbent Republican Jack Quinn, who was first elected in 1992, ran for re-election. Quinn was re-elected with 67.1% of the vote.

=== General election ===
==== Results ====
New York's 30th congressional district election, 2000
Party	Candidate	Votes	%
Republican	Jack Quinn (incumbent)	138,452	67.1
Democratic	John Fee	67,819	32.9
Total votes		206,271	100.0
Republican hold			

== District 31 ==
2000 New York's 31st congressional district election
- November 7, 2000
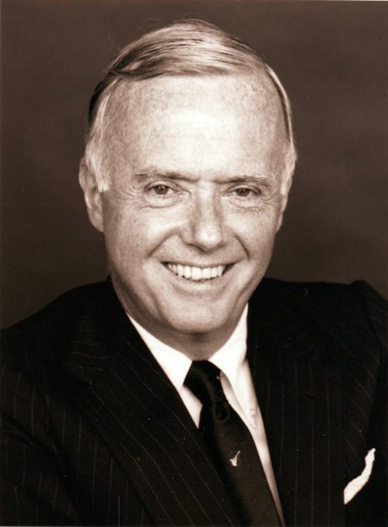

Nominee	Amo Houghton	Kisun Peters
Party	Republican	Democratic
Popular vote	154,238	45,193
Percentage	77.3%	22.7%
- County results Houghton: 60–70% 70–80% 80–90%
U.S. Representative before election
Amo Houghton
Republican
Elected U.S. Representative
Amo Houghton
Republican

Incumbent Republican Amo Houghton, who was first elected in 1986, ran for re-election. Houghton was re-elected with 77.3% of the vote.

=== General election ===
==== Results ====
New York's 31st congressional district election, 2000
Party	Candidate	Votes	%
Republican	Amo Houghton (incumbent)	154,238	77.3
Democratic	Kisun Peters	45,193	22.7
Total votes		199,431	100.0
Republican hold			

== See also ==
- 2000 United States House of Representatives elections
