= Timothy Bishop =

Timothy Bishop may refer to:

- Tim Bishop (born 1950), American politician who served as a U.S. Representative from 2003 to 2015
- Timothy Bishop, American live tournament low stakes poker player active on the World Series of Poker Circuit
