= Michael Forbes (politician) =

American politician (born 1952)

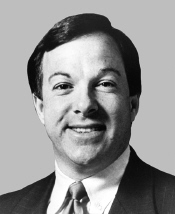

Member of the U.S. House of Representatives from New York's 1st district
- In office January 3, 1995 – January 3, 2001
- Preceded by: George Hochbrueckner
- Succeeded by: Felix Grucci

Personal details
- Born: Michael Patrick Forbes; July 16, 1952 (age 74) Riverhead, New York, U.S.
- Party: Republican (before 1999); Democratic (1999–present)
- Education: University at Albany (BA); University of Ottawa (MA); Saint Paul University (JCL); University of Mary (MS)

Michael Patrick Forbes (born July 16, 1952) is an American former politician from the state of New York. Forbes represented a Long Island district in the United States House of Representatives from 1995 to 2001, first as a Republican (until 1999) and then as a Democrat. He was an influential member of the House Appropriations Committee throughout his tenure on Capitol Hill. Forbes left Congress after being defeated in the 2000 Democratic primary election. Since leaving politics, Forbes has devoted his life to service in the Roman Catholic Church. He was ordained in 2013 as a permanent deacon by Most Reverend Joe S. Vasquez, Bishop of Austin. Forbes was invited to become a fellow in the Inspired Leadership Initiative at the University of Notre Dame for the 2023-2024 academic year. He and his wife, Barbara, reside in Granger, Indiana.

== Early life and career ==
Michael Patrick Forbes was born on 16 July 1952 at Riverhead, New York, to Kenneth and Jane (née Morrissey) Forbes. He is the grandson of Carrie Bowman, a Broadway actress, and T. Harold Forbes, an actor and Vaudeville song and danceman who became a well-known newspaper publisher in New Rochelle and Long Island, New York. Forbes holds degrees from the SUNY Albany, Saint Paul University, the University of Ottawa, and the University of Mary. He studied American history, political science, bioethics and canon law, and received an honorary Doctor of Law from Long Island University. Forbes got his start in politics as an assistant to New York State Assembly Speaker Perry B. Duryea Jr. He was a close advisor and senior aide to U.S. Senator Al D'Amato and U.S. Rep. Connie Mack III. In 1979, Forbes joined the presidential campaign of George H.W. Bush as a campaign operative in Upstate New York and again, in 1987, successfully campaigned statewide in Maine for Bush to succeed Ronald Reagan. President Bush appointed Forbes to a senior post in the Small Business Administration in 1989. He served four years, leaving in 1993 when the Clinton administration came into office.

Forbes remains involved as a former founding board member, and volunteer of the not-for-profit Camp Agawam, an alumni-owned boys summer camp in Raymond, Maine. He and his older brother, Ken, his father, Ken Sr., and Forbes’s sons, Ted, Sam, Max, and most of their male relatives spent their summers on Agawam’s Crescent Lake dating from the camp’s founding in 1919. Forbes first attended Agawam in 1965.

== Congress ==
In 1994, Forbes ran on three ballot lines for the House of Representatives: Republican, Conservative, and Right to Life. Campaigning as a fiscal conservative, he defeated incumbent George Hochbrueckner by six percentage points. Forbes was honored with a seat on the powerful Appropriations committee, unusual for a freshman Representative, after defeating an incumbent congressman and because of his close ties to the new GOP House Speaker Newt Gingrich. In December 1996, after Gingrich was cited for gross campaign irregularities, Forbes became the first Republican to announce he was not going to vote for Gingrich for speaker. Forbes instead voted for Jim Leach, a congressman from Iowa and a moderate Republican. Despite his record of support for a number of President Bill Clinton's programs, particularly his health insurance for all Americans, Forbes voted to impeach Clinton in 1998.

=== Party switch ===
On July 17, 1999, Forbes switched to the Democratic Party after chastising national Republicans for being "tone deaf" to the needs of average Americans. While embraced nationally by President Bill Clinton, House Democratic Leader Dick Gephardt, U.S Senators Ted Kennedy and Max Cleland and other Senate and House Democrats, New York's liberal Democrats (particularly chairwoman Judith Hope) refused to welcome Forbes into the Democratic Party because he would not change his long-held belief in the sanctity of human life and push to prohibit abortion.

Activists in the Suffolk County Democratic Party recruited a 71-year-old librarian, Regina Seltzer, to challenge Forbes in the 2000 Democratic primary. Seltzer won a court ruling halting state Democratic Party ads for Forbes. Both the national and state Republican parties secretly funneled $250,000 to Seltzer’s primary, which she won by just 35 votes. Fireworks company executive Felix Grucci, a Republican, beat Seltzer and took Forbes's place in the Congress. Grucci served a single term in Congress, being defeated in 2002 by Democrat Tim Bishop, who served until 2015.

== Career after Congress ==
Forbes is married to Barbara Ann (Blackburn) Forbes and has four children: Abigail, Theodore, Samuel, Maxamilian and seven grandchildren: Noah, Sophie, Stella, Clara, Connor, Whyatt, and Hunter. In his post-Congress years, Forbes worked as a public relations executive, founding his own communications firm in 2001. His clients included defense industry contractors, financial services, Internet payment providers, non-profit children's home, and other small businesses seeking Federal legislative relief and appropriations. He has also blogged for the Huffington Post.

In 2005, Forbes and his wife moved to Round Rock, Texas, then in 2023, to Granger, Indiana. In 2008, he entered five years of formation and theological study in the Diocese of Austin to become a permanent deacon in the Roman Catholic Church. He was ordained clergy in the Roman Catholic Diocese of Austin by Bishop Joe S. Vásquez on April 13, 2013. For ten years, he served at Saint William Catholic Church in Round Rock. Today, Forbes is a deacon at St. Monica Parish in Mishawaka, Indiana, and assists as a canon lawyer in the tribunal for the diocese.

In 2016, Forbes earned both ecclesiastical and civil degrees in canon (Church) law (the iuris canonici licentiate (J.C.L.) and a Master in Canon Law (M.C.L.) from Saint Paul University and the University of Ottawa, respectively. He proceeded to complete a Master in Science in Bioethics (MSBE) from the University of Mary at Bismarck, North Dakota, in 2021 to better serve his parish and diocese in critical life issues. In addition to having served as a judge on the ecclesiastical court of the Diocese of Austin, Forbes formerly served Bishop Vasquez as his canonist and as Vice Chancellor for the Diocese of Austin. He was also the director of diaconal ministry. He is a member of the Canon Law Society of America, the Canon Law Society of Great Britain and Ireland, the Canon Law Society of Australia New Zealand, and the Canadian Canon Law Society.

== See also ==
- List of American politicians who switched parties in office
- List of United States representatives who switched parties

U.S. House of Representatives
Preceded by George Hochbrueckner	Member of the U.S. House of Representatives from New York's 1st congressional district 1995–2001	Succeeded by Felix Grucci
U.S. order of precedence (ceremonial)
Preceded by Susan Molinari as Former U.S. Representative	Order of precedence of the United States as Former U.S. Representative	Succeeded by Bill Owens as Former U.S. Representative
