= George J. Hochbrueckner =

American politician

George Hochbrueckner
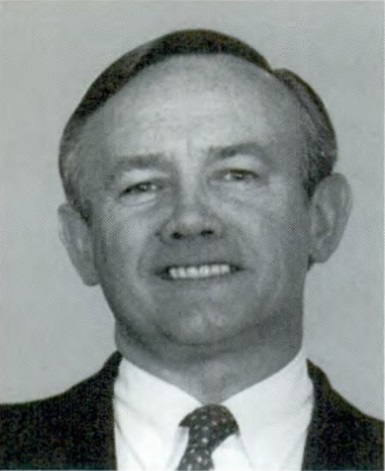

Member of the U.S. House of Representatives from New York's 1st district
- In office January 3, 1987 – January 3, 1995
- Preceded by: William Carney
- Succeeded by: Michael Forbes

Member of the New York State Assembly
- In office January 1, 1975 – December 31, 1984
- Preceded by: Peter J. Costigan
- Succeeded by: Robert J. Gaffney
- Constituency: 2nd district (1975–1982); 4th district (1983–1984)

Personal details
- Born: George Joseph Hochbrueckner; September 20, 1938 (age 87) New York City, New York, U.S.
- Party: Democratic
- Spouse: Carol
- Children: 4
- Education: State University of New York, Stony Brook; Hofstra University; Franklin Pierce University; California State University, Northridge

George Joseph Hochbrueckner (born September 20, 1938) is a former Democratic member of the United States House of Representatives from New York, serving four terms in office from 1987 to 1995.

== Education and career ==
After graduating high school in 1956, Hochbrueckner served in the United States Navy as an Aviation Electronics Technician until he was honorably discharged in 1959. He attended college for 2 1/2 years, including the State University of New York at Stony Brook, Hofstra University, and California State University, Northridge. He then pursued on the job training as an engineer, working for Litton and Teledyne in California and Grumman in New York.

Hochbrueckner was a member of the New York State Assembly from 1975 to 1984, sitting in the 181st, 182nd, 183rd, 184th and 185th New York State Legislatures.

=== Congress ===
He was elected to Congress in 1986 and represented New York's 1st congressional district from January 3, 1987, until January 3, 1995. He lost his seat to Michael P. Forbes during the Republican Revolution of 1994.

=== Later career ===
After Congress, he worked as a Senior Policy Advisor at Nossaman LLP, working out of their Washington, D.C., office.

== Personal life ==
Hochbrueckner and his wife Carol were married in 1961. They lived in California from 1961 to 1968, then returned to Long Island.

U.S. House of Representatives
Preceded by William Carney	Member of the U.S. House of Representatives from New York's 1st congressional district 1987–1995	Succeeded by Michael P. Forbes
U.S. order of precedence (ceremonial)
Preceded by Elizabeth Holtzman as Former U.S. Representative	Order of precedence of the United States as Former U.S. Representative	Succeeded by Rick Lazio as Former U.S. Representative
