= Carrie Bowman =

American stage actress (1887–1971)

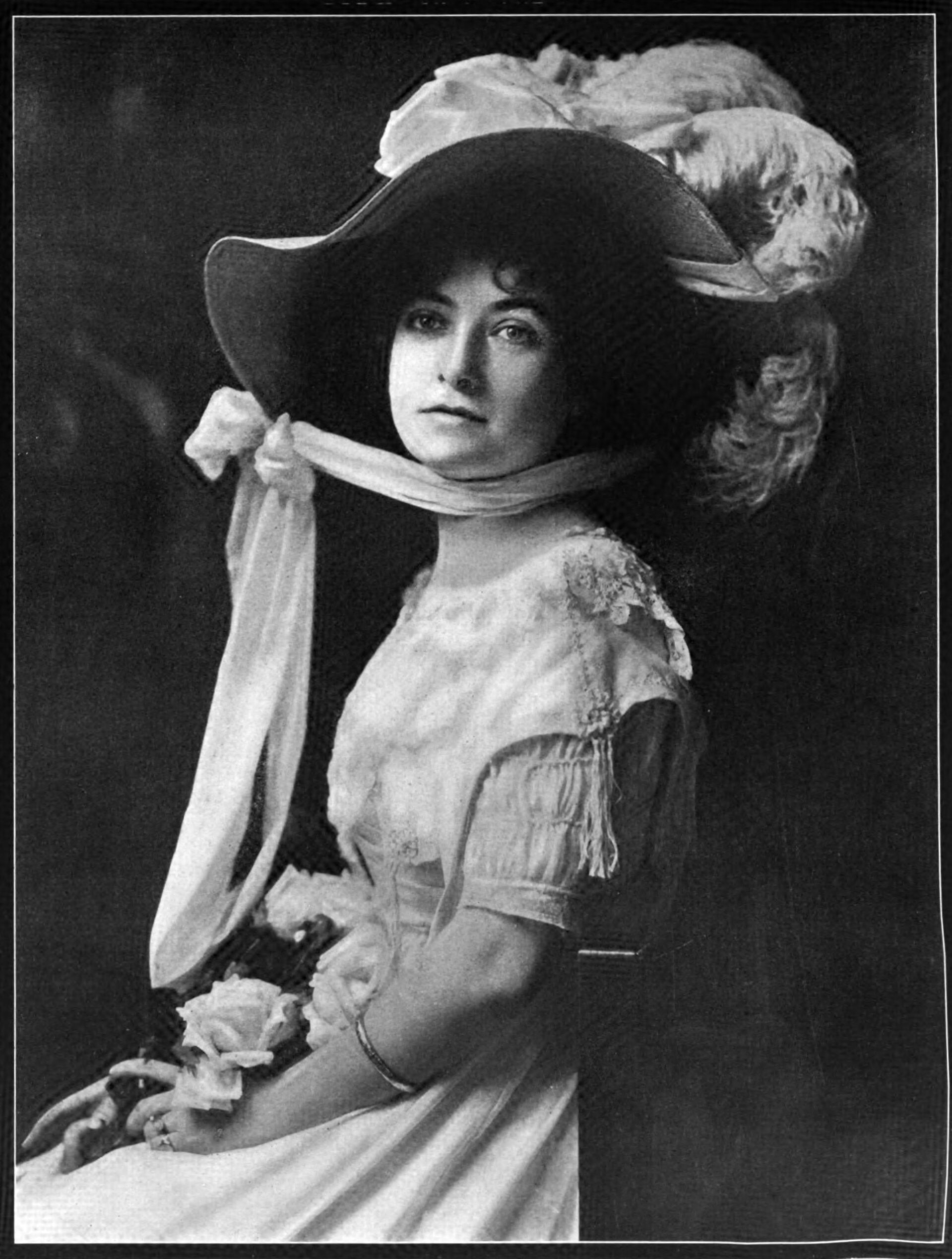
- Carrie Bowman in 1908 when she was appearing in George M. Cohan's The American Idea
- Born: Caroline Bohrmann; January 14, 1887; Atlanta, Georgia
- Died: November 22, 1971 (aged 84); Westhampton Beach, New York
- Occupation: Actress
- Spouse: Thomas Harold Forbes

Carrie Bowman (née Caroline Bohrmann; 14 January 1887 – 14 November 1971) was an American Broadway stage actress, active from 1901 to 1911.

== Career ==
Bowman was born to Leopold "Lee" Bohrmann (1853–1925) and Bertha Moses (maiden; (1866–1918) and was a granddaughter of the famed Jewish cantor (hazzan) and rabbi Marx Moses (1832–1913), originally of Essingen, Germany, who ministered to the early Reform Jewish communities in America.

== Family ==
While on post-Broadway tour performing Wilbur D. Nesbit (book), Hoschna (music), and Harbach's (lyrics) musical, The Girl of My Dreams, Bowman – on April 7, 1912, in Huntington, West Virginia – married her vaudeville partner, Thomas Harold Forbes (1885–1953) of the New Rochelle, New York, printing family. They retired from the stage, moved to New Rochelle, New York, and Forbes went into the family publishing business, building a chain of suburban newspapers, starting with the New Rochelle Standard-Star. They had five children. Thomas Harold Forbes died in 1953, and Carrie relocated to Westhampton Beach, New York, where she died in 1971. One of their grandsons, Michael Patrick Forbes (born 1952), went on to become a U.S. Congressman from New York, Michael Patrick Forbes.
