= William Carney (politician) =

American politician (1942–2017)

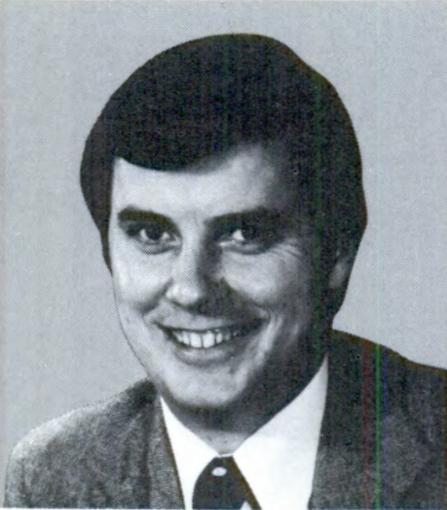

Member of the U.S. House of Representatives from New York's 1st district
- In office January 3, 1979 – January 3, 1987
- Preceded by: Otis G. Pike
- Succeeded by: George J. Hochbrueckner

Member of the Suffolk County Legislature from the 6th district
- In office January 1976 – December 1978
- Preceded by: Angela Christenson
- Succeeded by: Donald C. Allgrove

Personal details
- Born: July 1, 1942 New York City, U.S.
- Died: May 22, 2017 (aged 74) Washington, D.C., U.S.
- Party: Conservative (until 1985); Republican (from 1985)
- Spouse: Barbara Ann Haverlin (m. 1966)
- Children: 2
- Education: Florida State University

Military service
- Branch/service: United States Army
- Years of service: 1961–1964
- Unit: Medical Corps

William Carney (July 1, 1942 – May 22, 2017) was an American politician from New York who served in the Suffolk County, New York Legislature and United States House of Representatives as a member of the Conservative and Republican parties. He is the only registered member of the Conservative Party of New York State to be elected to the United States House of Representatives. He is one of two members of the Conservative Party to be elected to the United States Congress along with James L. Buckley, who was elected to the United States Senate from New York's Class I seat in 1970.

After serving in Suffolk County, New York's county legislature Carney was elected to the United States House of Representatives with the support of the Republican Party. He was reelected three more times before changing his party affiliation to Republican in 1985 in an attempt to gain a leadership position in the Republican House caucus. However, he chose to not seek reelection in 1986, due to negative reactions to his support of the Shoreham Nuclear Power Plant.

== Early life ==
William Carney was born on July 1, 1942, in the Brooklyn borough of New York City, New York, to Joseph and Sally Carney. In 1960, he graduated from Delehanty High School and attended Florida State University from 1960 to 1961. From 1961 to 1964, he served in the United States Army Medical Corps.

In April 1965, he met Barbara Ann Haverlin, proposed to her on May 14, 1965, married her on May 14, 1966, and later had two children with her. Before entering politics he was a salesman for heavy equipment in Hauppauge, New York.

== Career ==
=== Suffolk County Legislature ===
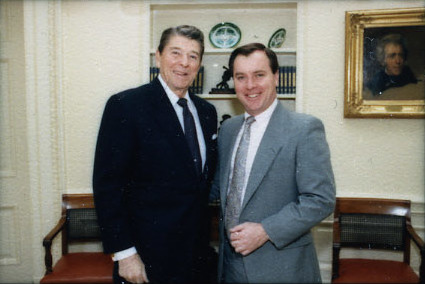
Carney with President Ronald Reagan in 1986

In 1975, Carney received the nomination of the Conservative Party to run in the sixth district for the Suffolk County Legislature. In the general election he defeated incumbent legislator Angela Christenson. He took office in January 1976, and served until December 1978, as he had chosen to seek election to the United States House of Representatives. He was succeeded by Donald C. Allgrove, a member of the Republican Party.

=== United States House of Representatives ===
==== Elections ====
During New York's gubernatorial election in 1978, Perry B. Duryea Jr., who had received the Republican gubernatorial nomination, sought the Conservative Party's ballot line in his attempt to defeat incumbent Democratic Governor Hugh Carey. The Conservative and New York Republican parties created a compromise in which Duryea would be given the Conservative ballot line in the gubernatorial election and Carney would be allowed to run in the 1st congressional district's Republican primary. Although Duryea had the nominations of both the Republican and Conservative parties through electoral fusion, he lost to Carey in the general election with 45% of the popular vote.

In 1978, Carney ran for the Republican nomination in New York's 1st congressional district and defeated four opponents. In the general election he defeated John Randolph. He and Gerald Solomon were the only Republicans to flip seats held by the Democratic Party and Carney was the first registered member of the Conservative Party to win election to the United States House of Representatives.

During the 1980 elections he defeated John Hart in the Republican primary and also received the nominations of the Conservative and New York State Right to Life parties. In the general election he defeated Democratic nominee Thomas Twomey.

On May 24, 1982, Carney announced that he would seek reelection and easily defeated Democratic nominee Ethan Eldon, receiving over sixty percent of the popular vote, with the Republican, Conservative, and Right to Life parties' nominations.

On March 19, 1984, he announced that he would seek reelection and defeated Suffolk County legislator Gregory Blass in the Republican primary, although Blass attempted to have a recount conducted. In the general election he narrowly defeated Democratic and Ratepayers Against Lilco nominee George J. Hochbrueckner, a member of the New York State Assembly. The Ratepayers Against Lilco ballot line was created by Hockbrueckner in opposition of the Long Island Lighting Company's construction of the Shoreham Nuclear Power Plant, which Carney supported.

==== Tenure ====
In 1979, Carney had the lowest income out of all of the members of the House of Representatives and had a 100% voting attendance rate. In 1980, the American Civil Liberties Union gave him a zero percent rating; Carney and Earl Hutto, the Democratic representative from Florida's 1st congressional district, were the only members of the House of Representatives to receive a zero percent rating. In 1981, President Ronald Reagan selected him as one of forty-eight people to meet with Pope John Paul II during a refueling stop in Anchorage, Alaska. On May 23, 1983, he became the chairman of Suffolk County Executive Peter Cohalan's reelection committee.

In 1985, he was appointed to the House Committee on Armed Services during the 99th session of the House of Representatives.

On October 8, 1985, he announced that he had changed his party affiliation from Conservative to Republican in an attempt to improve his chances of receiving the Deputy Minority Whip position. Tom Loeffler, the current Deputy Minority Whip, had announced that he would run for the Republican nomination in the 1986 Texas gubernatorial election. The Conservative Party leader in the 1st congressional district, Harold Haar, stated that he regretted Carney's decision, but that he understood why.

On May 22, 1986, Carney announced that he would not seek reelection as his unpopularity was rising due to his support of the construction of the Shoreham Nuclear Power Plant.

== Later life ==
After leaving the House of Representatives Carney was given a position on the American Security Council Foundation that paid $100,000 per year.

In 2013, he contracted prostate cancer and later died from it on May 22, 2017, in Washington, D.C. Following his death he was praised by Representative Lee Zeldin. Carney was buried in Arlington National Cemetery in Arlington County, Virginia.

== Political positions ==
=== Domestic ===
In 1976, Carney opposed a sales tax increase that was requested by Suffolk County Executive John Klein. In 1981, $690,000 was earmarked for the creation of a new post office in Farmingville, New York, where Carney's district office was located.

In 1982, President Reagan vetoed legislation that would grant $14.2 billion in fiscal spending. Four Republicans, including Carney, out of seventeen in the House of Representatives from New York voted to sustain Reagan's veto. Only six members of New York's thirty-nine House delegation voted to sustain Reagan's veto.

On August 2, 1983, the House of Representatives voted 338 to 90, with Carney voting against, in favor of legislation that would create a federally recognized holiday in honor of Martin Luther King Jr. Carney, Guy Molinari, Barber Conable, David O'Brien Martin, and Gerald Solomon were the only members of New York's House delegation to vote against the legislation.

=== Foreign ===
In 1979, Carney, Norman F. Lent, and Gerald Solomon sent a letter to Attorney General Benjamin Civiletti asking him to investigate black leaders who met with Yasser Arafat for violation of the Logan Act.

In 1981, Carney and 107 other members of the House of Representatives signed a letter asking for the withdrawal of the visa given to Ian Paisley, the leader of the Democratic Unionist Party, by President Jimmy Carter. Carney signed the letter and presented it to Deputy Secretary of State William P. Clark Jr. The Department of State later chose to revoke Paisley's visa in December.

In 1982, he supported President Reagan's opposition to a non-binding resolution in favor of a nuclear freeze. On December 21, 1982, twenty-four members of the House of Representative, including Carney, sent an eight-page letter to Archbishop Joseph Bernardin defending Reagan's nuclear policy.

In 1983, he praised President Reagan for sending Marines to Grenada to restore the government overthrown by the People's Revolutionary Government. Carney supported giving aid to the Contras during the Nicaraguan Revolution.

On April 29, 1985, and January 23, 1986, he introduced resolutions that would designate June 14, as Baltic Freedom Day and show disapproval of the Soviet Union's refusal to recognize the independence of Lithuania, Estonia, and Latvia.

== Electoral history ==
William Carney electoral history

1978 New York 1st congressional district Republican primary
Party	Candidate	Votes	%
Republican	William Carney	4,939	31.08%
Republican	James M. Catterson	3,203	20.16%
Republican	John J. Hart	3,085	19.41%
Republican	Salvatore Nicosia	2,624	16.51%
Republican	John M. Radway	2,041	12.84%
Total votes		15,892	100.00%

1978 New York 1st congressional district election
Party	Candidate	Votes	%	±%
Republican	William Carney	75,586	47.18%	+17.45%
Conservative	William Carney	14,529	9.07%	+4.12%
Total	William Carney	90,115	56.25%	+26.52%
Democratic	John Randolph	67,180	41.93%	−23.39%
Liberal	Dorothy A. Samek	2,909	1.82%	−0.95%
Total votes		160,204	100.00%	

1980 New York 1st congressional district Republican primary
Party	Candidate	Votes	%	±%
Republican	William Carney (incumbent)	15,210	57.81%	+26.73%
Republican	John J. Hart	11,102	42.19%	+22.78%
Total votes		26,312	100.00%	

1980 New York 1st congressional district election
Party	Candidate	Votes	%	±%
Republican	William Carney (incumbent)	91,647	44.82%	−2.36%
Conservative	William Carney (incumbent)	15,174	7.42%	−1.65%
Right to Life	William Carney (incumbent)	8,382	4.10%	+4.10%
Total	William Carney (incumbent)	115,213	56.34%	+0.09%
Democratic	Thomas Twomey	85,629	41.88%	−0.05%
Liberal	Richard M. Cummings	3,644	1.78%	−0.04%
Total votes		204,486	100.00%	

1982 New York 1st congressional district election
Party	Candidate	Votes	%	±%
Republican	William Carney (incumbent)	72,978	52.87%	+8.05%
Conservative	William Carney (incumbent)	9,515	6.98%	−0.44%
Right to Life	William Carney (incumbent)	5,741	4.16%	+0.06%
Total	William Carney (incumbent)	88,234	63.93%	+7.59%
Democratic	Ethan C. Eldon	49,787	36.07%	−5.81%
Total votes		138,021	100.00%	

1984 New York 1st congressional district Republican primary
Party	Candidate	Votes	%	±%
Republican	William Carney (incumbent)	8,059	52.55%	−5.26%
Republican	Gregory J. Blass	7,276	47.45%	N/A
Total votes		15,335	100.00%	

1984 New York 1st congressional district election
Party	Candidate	Votes	%	±%
Republican	William Carney (incumbent)	92,262	45.77%	−7.10%
Conservative	William Carney (incumbent)	10,405	5.16%	−1.82%
Right to Life	William Carney (incumbent)	4,365	2.17%	−1.99%
Total	William Carney (incumbent)	107,029	53.10%	-10.83%
Democratic	George J. Hochbrueckner	84,058	41.70%	+5.63%
Ratepayers Against Lilco	George J. Hochbrueckner	10,493	5.21%	+5.21%
Total	George J. Hochbrueckner	84,058	46.91%	+10.84%
Total votes		201,580	100.00%	

== See also ==
- List of United States representatives who switched parties

U.S. House of Representatives
Preceded by Otis G. Pike	Member of the U.S. House of Representatives from New York's 1st congressional district 1979–1987	Succeeded by George J. Hochbrueckner
