= Felix Grucci =

American politician (born 1951)

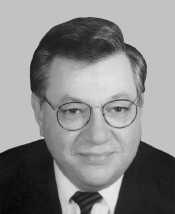

Member of the U.S. House of Representatives from New York's 1st district
- In office January 3, 2001 – January 3, 2003
- Preceded by: Michael Forbes
- Succeeded by: Tim Bishop

Town Supervisor of Brookhaven
- In office 1996–2000
- Preceded by: John LaMura
- Succeeded by: John LaValle

Member of the Brookhaven Town Board
- In office January 5, 1993 – 1996
- Preceded by: John Powell
- Succeeded by: ???

Personal details
- Born: Felix James Grucci Jr. November 25, 1951 (age 74) Brookhaven, New York, U.S.
- Party: Republican
- Spouse: Madeleine Grucci
- Children: 2

Felix James Grucci Jr. (born November 25, 1951) is an American politician from New York who served in the United States House of Representatives from New York's 1st congressional district as a member of the Republican Party.

== Early life ==
Grucci was born on November 25, 1951, in Brookhaven, New York, to Felix James Grucci Sr. and Concetta DiDio. In 1970, he graduated from Bellport High School. After graduating from high school he started working for his family's business, Fireworks by Grucci.

== Career ==
=== Politics ===
From 1988 to 1991, Grucci served on the Suffolk County planning commission.

In 1990, he received the Republican nomination to run in a special election for a seat in the New York State Assembly to replace John Powell, who had resigned after winning election to the Brookhaven Town Board. In the election he was defeated by former Assemblyman William Bianchi.

From 1991 to 1993, Grucci served as the chairman of Brookhaven's Zoning Board of Appeals. On January 5, 1993, he was appointed to the Brookhaven Town Board to fill the vacancy created by John Powell after he accepted a position on the Suffolk County Board of Elections. In 1995, he defeated Democratic nominee Thomas Oberle to win election as Brookhaven Town Supervisor.

=== U.S. House of Representatives ===
==== 2000 ====
On March 20, 2000, Grucci announced that he would run for the Republican nomination in New York's 1st congressional district. Incumbent Representative Michael Forbes, who had switched his political affiliation from Republican to Democratic, was defeated in the Democratic primary by Regina Seltzer. In the general election Grucci defeated Seltzer with 133,020 votes to her 97,299.

During the election Grucci was endorsed by Arizona Senator John McCain, Suffolk County Republican Chairman Tony Apollaro, Suffolk County Clerk Ed Romaine, Assembly-member Pat Accampora, Brookhaven Town Councilor John LaValle, Southold Town Councilor Bill Moore, and Southampton Village trustee Bill Manger.

==== 2002 ====
During the 2002 congressional elections Grucci released a radio advertisement which stated that Tim Bishop had "turned his back" on rape victims at Southampton College. Grucci was criticized for the advertisement and Bishop filed a lawsuit to prevent the advertisement from being played. Amy Walter stated that the advertisement was "a big turning point in this contest" as it was initially predicted that Grucci would easily win reelection.

In the general election Bishop narrowly defeated Grucci with 84,276 votes to 81,524.

== Later life ==
In 2013, Grucci and his sister, Donna Grucci Butler, stepped down as presidents of Fireworks by Grucci and were succeeded by their nephew, Felix Grucci III.

== Political positions ==
On October 10, 2002, Grucci voted in favor of the Authorization for Use of Military Force Against Iraq Resolution of 2002.

== Electoral history ==
2000 New York's 1st congressional district election
Party	Candidate	Votes	%
Republican	Felix Grucci	111,003	46.33%
Right to Life	Felix Grucci	8,746	3.65%
Conservative	Felix Grucci	7,569	3.16%
Independence	Felix Grucci	5,702	2.38%
Total	Felix Grucci	133,020	55.52%
Democratic	Regina Seltzer	97,299	40.61%
Working Families	Michael Forbes (incumbent)	6,318	2.64%
Green	William G. Holst	2,967	1.24%
Total votes		239,604	100.00%
Blank/scattering	Void	29,574	

2002 New York's 1st congressional district election
Party	Candidate	Votes	%
Democratic	Tim Bishop	81,325	48.47%
Working Families	Tim Bishop	2,951	1.76%
Total	Tim Bishop	84,276	50.23%
Republican	Felix Grucci (incumbent)	64,999	38.74%
Conservative	Felix Grucci (incumbent)	6,116	3.65%
Right to Life	Felix Grucci (incumbent)	5,887	3.51%
Independence	Felix Grucci (incumbent)	4,522	2.70%
Total	Felix Grucci (incumbent)	81,524	48.59%
Green	Lorna Salzman	1,991	1.19%
Total votes		167,791	100.00%
Blank/scattering	Void	10,739	

U.S. House of Representatives
Preceded by Michael Forbes	Member of the U.S. House of Representatives from New York's 1st congressional district 2001–2003	Succeeded by Tim Bishop
Political offices
Preceded by John LaMura	Town Supervisor of the Town of Brookhaven; 1995–2000	Succeeded by John La Valle
U.S. order of precedence (ceremonial)
Preceded by Dan Frisa as Former U.S. Representative	Order of precedence of the United States as Former U.S. Representative	Succeeded by Chris Lee as Former U.S. Representative
