= Tim Bishop =

American politician (born 1950)

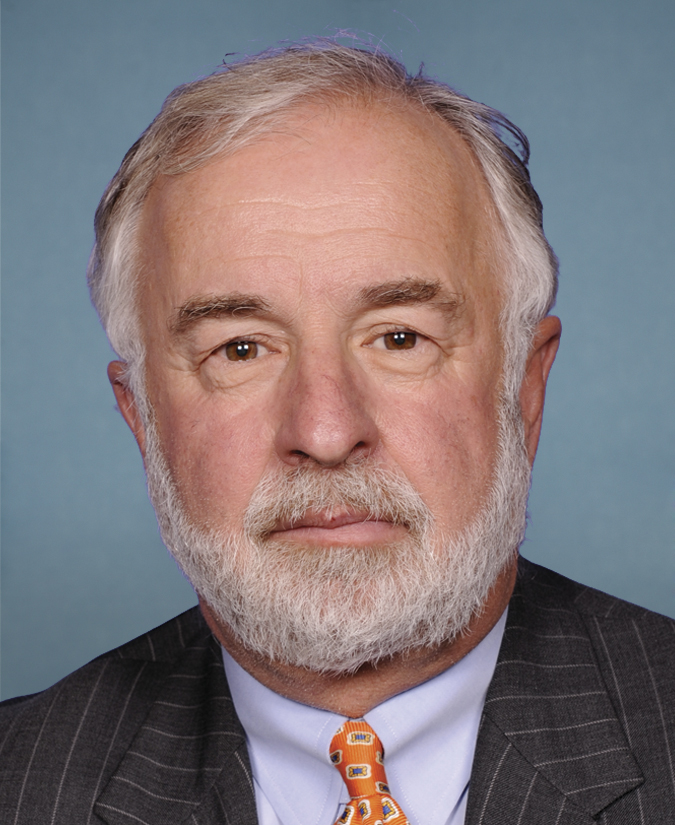
- Official portrait, 2011

Member of the U.S. House of Representatives from New York's 1st district
- In office January 3, 2003 – January 3, 2015
- Preceded by: Felix Grucci
- Succeeded by: Lee Zeldin

Personal details
- Born: Timothy Howard Bishop; June 1, 1950 (age 76) Southampton, New York, U.S.
- Party: Democratic
- Spouse: Kathy Bishop
- Children: 2
- Education: College of the Holy Cross (BA); Long Island University (MPA)

Timothy Howard Bishop (born June 1, 1950) is an American politician who served as a U.S. representative for New York's 1st congressional district from 2003 to 2015. He is a member of the Democratic Party.

Bishop was elected in 2002, defeating incumbent Felix Grucci. He was reelected in 2004, 2006, 2008, 2010, and 2012. He lost reelection in 2014 to Lee Zeldin, whom he had previously defeated in 2008.

== Early life and education ==
Bishop was born in Southampton, New York, on June 1, 1950. He is the son of Catherine (Roesel) and Howard Cortland Bishop. He is the great-grandson of Benjamin H. Bishop, a mayor of Southampton, and has English, Irish, and German ancestry. He graduated from the College of the Holy Cross with a Bachelor of Arts in history in 1972 and earned a Master of Public Administration from Long Island University in 1981.

== Academic career ==
Bishop began working at Southampton College in 1973 as an admissions counselor. He served as provost at the college for 16 years. He also served as the college's director of financial aid, assistant director of admissions, registrar, director of institutional research and planning, dean for enrollment services, and dean for administrative and student services. During his tenure, Southampton College of Long Island University produced 36 Fulbright Scholars. Along with the Southampton College Chancellor, Robert F. X. Sillerman, Bishop developed the most successful single fund-raising event in the college's history, the All for the Sea rock concerts which grossed as much as $1 million annually.

== U.S. House of Representatives ==
Rep. Tim Bishop speaking at a lectern

=== Elections ===
==== 2002 ====
In his first political race, Bishop ran as a Democrat against Republican incumbent Felix J. Grucci, Jr. During the campaign, Grucci ran radio ads accusing Bishop of falsifying rape statistics at Southampton College, but his claims were based on articles from a college newspaper that contained numerous inaccuracies. Grucci refused to repudiate the ads and was defeated by Bishop.

==== 2004 ====
Bishop was re-elected in 2004, defeating Republican William M. Manger, Jr. by a 56.2%-43.8% margin.

==== 2006 ====
Bishop beat Republican Italo Zanzi, 62.2%-37.8%.

==== 2008 ====
In 2008, incumbent Bishop defeated Republican Lee Zeldin, 58%-42% .

==== 2010 ====
Bishop narrowly defeated Republican Randy Altschuler by a margin of 50.2% to 49.8%. Altschuler conceded the race when trailing by 263 votes.

==== 2012 ====
Bishop again defeated Republican Randy Altschuler by a 52.2% to 47.8% margin. Although Bishop received the Independence Party endorsement in most of his previous elections, in 2012 the endorsement went instead to his opponent.

==== 2014 ====
Bishop ran unopposed for the Democratic, Working Families and Independence Party nominations. He was a member of the Democratic Congressional Campaign Committee's Frontline Program, a program designed to help protect vulnerable Democratic incumbents heading into the 2014 election. He faced Republican nominee Lee Zeldin, whom he had defeated in 2008, in the general election. On November 4, 2014, Bishop lost his re-election bid to Zeldin, 55% to 45%.

=== Tenure ===
Bishop supported and voted for the Affordable Care Act and the Health Care and Education Reconciliation Act of 2010.

Bishop also voted for the Housing and Economic Recovery Act of 2008, the Emergency Economic Stabilization Act (TARP), and the American Recovery and Reinvestment Act of 2009 (also known as the "stimulus bill"), and for further measures in 2009 and 2010. He also voted for the Budget Control Act of 2011, which provided for further gradual increments in the debt limit.

Bishop participated in the bipartisan coalition of elected officials and community advocates that saved the 106th Air Rescue Wing located at Gabreski Airport from being shut down by the Pentagon's base closure commission.

In opposition to a plan that would have dumped more than twenty million cubic yards of contaminated dredge waste in the Long Island Sound, Bishop sponsored legislation to block the plan. In January 2007, he voted for a reduction of interest rates on future federal student loans.

Bishop supported the Shinnecock Indian tribe's successful attempts at gaining formal federal recognition. Bishop supported a $160,000 line-item for the Shinnecock Nation in President Obama's 2013 budget proposal.

==== Ethics investigation ====
In September 2013, the Office of Congressional Ethics recommended further review of an August 2012 incident in which Bishop was accused of soliciting a campaign contribution from hedge fund magnate Eric Semler in exchange for acting in an official capacity to obtain a fireworks permit for Semler's son's bar mitzvah on Long Island. Bishop denied the allegations as "outrageous, unfounded attacks on my character and my family". After the incident was picked up by the media, Semler called the allegations a "nonstory".

The Federal Bureau of Investigation investigated the incident. In September 2014, the Justice Department closed its investigation without filing charges, although the ethics probe remained open until Bishop left office in January 2015.

=== Committee assignments ===
- Committee on Education and the Workforce
  - Subcommittee on Workforce Protections
  - Subcommittee on Higher Education and Workforce Training
- Committee on Transportation and Infrastructure
  - Subcommittee on Coast Guard and Maritime Transportation
  - Subcommittee on Railroads, Pipelines, and Hazardous Materials
  - Subcommittee on Water Resources and the Environment (Ranking Member)
  - Subcommittee on Highways and Transit

=== Caucus memberships ===
- National Archives Caucus, Co-chair
- Democratic Budget Group, Co-chair
- Coalition for Autism Research and Education (CARE)
- Community College Caucus
- Congressional Caucus on Armenian Issues
- Congressional Arts Caucus
- Congressional Caucus on Addiction, Treatment and Recovery
- Congressional Civility Caucus
- Congressional Humanities Caucus
- Congressional Labor and Working Families Caucus
- Congressional Long Island Sound Caucus
- Congressional Military Family Caucus
- Congressional Shipbuilding Caucus
- Congressional Sri Lanka Caucus
- Congressional Wine Caucus
- House Cancer Caucus
- House Democratic Caucus
- House Renewable Energy and Energy Efficiency Caucus
- House National Service Caucus
- Sudan Caucus
- Sustainable Energy and Environment Coalition
- United Services Organization (USO) Congressional Caucus

== Post-congressional career ==
After leaving Congress, Bishop joined St. Joseph's University as a distinguished professor of Civic Engagement and Public Service.

Bishop is a senior advisor to a Washington, D.C.–based government relations firm.

Bishop has accepted positions on the Board of Directors of Social Accountability International and The Sergeant Sullivan Center. Both commitments allow Bishop to continue on two of his top priorities in the Congress — working to ensure workplace protections and services to U.S. veterans, particularly in the area of post deployment health.

On March 20, 2018, Bishop was confirmed by the Suffolk County Legislature to a five-year term on the Suffolk County Water Authority (SCWA).

== Personal life ==
Bishop is married to Kathryn, founder and director of The Children's School Early Childhood program at Southampton College, and has two daughters, Molly and Meghan. He is a Roman Catholic.

U.S. House of Representatives
| Preceded by Felix Grucci | Member of the U.S. House of Representatives from New York's 1st congressional district 2003–2015 | Succeeded by Lee Zeldin |
U.S. order of precedence (ceremonial)
| Preceded by Anthony Weiner as Former U.S. Representative | Order of precedence of the United States as Former U.S. Representative | Succeeded by David Cicilline as Former U.S. Representative |
