= William H. Grier =

American psychiatrist

William Henry Grier (February 7, 1926 – September 3, 2015) was an American psychiatrist.

== Early life and education ==
Grier was born on February 7, 1926, in Birmingham, Alabama, the son of Henry Grier, a postal worker who lost his job when Grier was 12; the family subsequently moved to Detroit, Michigan, to live for a time with family.

He attended Howard University but left after a year to the University of Michigan where he received his bachelor of science degree (1945) and then his M.D..

== Career ==
He became a psychiatrist, and shortly thereafter, he was sent overseas as part of the Korean War and contracted polio which left him with a permanent limp.

He first worked as a psychiatrist in Detroit before moving to San Francisco, where he met Price M. Cobbs. Together, they published the book Black Rage in 1968. Black Rage was a groundbreaking work on race and became required reading in college classes. In 1971, they co-wrote another book about black churches called The Jesus Bag.

He was the chairman of the department of psychiatry at Meharry Medical College in Nashville, Tennessee, in the 1970s. He then had a psychiatric practice in San Diego until he retired in the 1990s.

He is the father of David Alan Grier.

He died on September 3, 2015, in Carlsbad, California.
