= Charles Pitman =

Charles Pitman may refer to:

- Charles W. Pitman (died 1871), Whig member of the U.S. House of Representatives from Pennsylvania
- Charles Pitman (game warden) (1890–1975), herpetologist and conservationist
- C.M. Pitman (Charles Murray Pitman, 1872–1948), British judge and rower
- Charles H. Pitman (1935–2020), United States Marine Corps general

== See also ==
- Charles Pittman (disambiguation)
