= Charles Pitts (disambiguation) =

Charles Pitts may refer to:

- Charles Pitts (1947–2012), American soul and blues guitarist
- Charles Pitts (broadcaster) (1941-2015), American gay activist and radio personality

== See also ==
- Charles Pittman (disambiguation)
- Charles Potts (born 1943), American counter-culture poet
