= Belfi =

Belfi is a surname of Italian origin. Notable people with the surname include:

- Andrea Belfi (born 1979), Italian electro-acoustic musician and composer
- Donald E. Belfi (1936–2020), American lawyer, judge, and politician
- Jordan Belfi (born 1978), American actor
