= Carol Anderson =

American academic (born 1959)

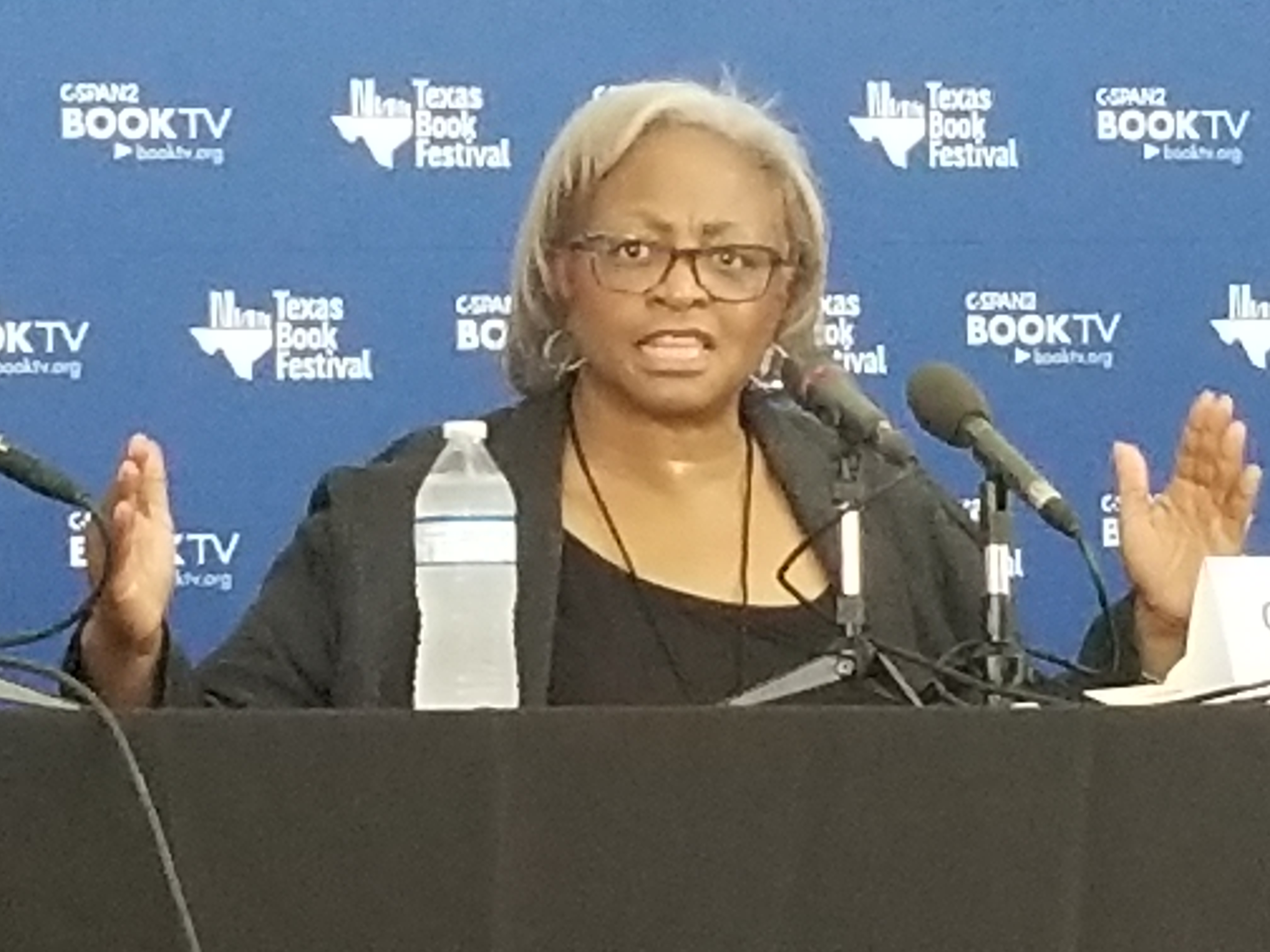
- At the Texas Book Festival on November 5, 2017
- Born: Carol Elaine Anderson; June 17, 1959 (age 67)
- Occupation: Professor
- Board member of: National Economic & Social Rights Initiative (NESRI)

Academic background
- Education: Miami University (BA, MA) Ohio State University (PhD)

Academic work
- Discipline: African American Studies
- Institutions: Emory University
- Notable works: White Rage: The Unspoken Truth of Our Racial Divide
- Website: www.professorcarolanderson.org

Carol Elaine Anderson (born June 17, 1959) is an American academic. She is the Charles Howard Candler professor of African American Studies at Emory University. Her research focuses on public policy with regard to race, justice, and equality. In 2023, she was elected to the American Philosophical Society.

== Education ==
Anderson earned bachelor's and master's degrees at Miami University in Oxford, Ohio, in 1981 and 1983, respectively. She earned a PhD in history from Ohio State University in 1995. She was awarded a fellowship to study at Harvard University in 2005, where she worked on her book, Bourgeois Radicals: The NAACP and the Struggle for Colonial Liberation, 1941–1960.

== Career ==
Anderson worked as an associate professor of history at the University of Missouri in Columbia. She was awarded a fellowship for teaching excellence in 2001. In 2009, Anderson joined the faculty of the African American Studies department at Emory University in Atlanta, Georgia.

In an op-ed for The Washington Post in 2014, Anderson argued that the conditions leading to the unrest following the 2014 Ferguson shooting was a manifestation of "white rage", or white backlash against African American advancement. The column was one of the most-read articles of the year, receiving thousands of comments, and Anderson was offered a book contract. The resulting book, White Rage: The Unspoken Truth of Our Racial Divide, expanded on the history of anti-black racism and retaliation in the United States.

White Rage became a New York Times Best Seller, and was listed as a notable book of 2016 by The New York Times, The Washington Post, The Boston Globe, and the Chicago Review of Books. White Rage was also listed by The New York Times as an Editors' Choice, and won the 2016 National Book Critics Circle Award for Criticism.

Anderson has discussed the historical context of voter suppression in relation to alleged intimidation of minority voters during the 2016 U.S. Presidential Election. She has also claimed that "white rage" was the reason for the election of Donald Trump.

In her 2021 book The Second: Race and Guns in a Fatally Unequal America, she argues that the Second Amendment to the U.S. Constitution created "a particularly maddening set of double standards where race is concerned". In his review of the book in The New York Times, Randall Kennedy characterized Anderson's double-standard argument as follows:

On the one hand, she claims that slaveholding founding fathers insisted on the inclusion of the Second Amendment in the Bill of Rights in order to assure themselves of a fighting force willing to suppress slave insurrections. On the other hand, she maintains that racist practices have deprived Blacks of access to arms that might have enabled them to defend themselves in the absence of equal protection of law.

Anderson has protested against human rights abuses of farm workers in Florida, in alliance with the Coalition of Immokalee Workers (CIW). She joined the CIW in calling for the supermarket chain Publix to join the Fair Food Program in response.

Anderson was a member of the Historical Advisory Committee of the U.S. Department of State. She is on the Board of Directors of the National Economic & Social Rights Initiative (NESRI).

Anderson is featured in the 2019 documentary After Selma, directed by Loki Mulholland, where she describes the history and current state of voter suppression in the United States.

Anderson was named the American Academy of Political and Social Science's 2021 W. E. B. Dubois Fellow.

In 2024, Anderson received the "Freedom Summer of '64" award from her alma mater, Miami University.

== Books ==
- Anderson, Carol (April 21, 2003). Eyes Off the Prize: The United Nations and the African American Struggle for Human Rights, 1944–1955. Cambridge University Press. ISBN 9780521531580.
- Anderson, Carol (December 8, 2014). Bourgeois Radicals: The NAACP and the Struggle for Colonial Liberation, 1941–1960. Cambridge University Press. ISBN 9780521763783.
- Anderson, Carol (May 31, 2016). White Rage: The Unspoken Truth of Our Racial Divide. Bloomsbury Publishing USA. ISBN 9781632864147.
- Anderson, Carol (September 11, 2018). One Person, No Vote: How Voter Suppression Is Destroying Our Democracy. Bloomsbury Publishing USA. ISBN 9781635571370.
- Anderson, Carol (June 1, 2021). The Second: Race and Guns in a Fatally Unequal America. Bloomsbury Publishing USA. ISBN 9781635574258.

== Selected awards and recognition ==
- 2003 – Gustavus Myers Outstanding Book Award, Eyes Off the Prize
- 2004 – Myrna F. Bernath Book Award, Eyes Off the Prize
- 2016 – Politico 50
- 2016 – Winner, National Book Critics Circle Award for Criticism, White Rage
