= Race (play) =

2009 Broadway play by David Mamet

- Original Broadway poster
- Original language: English
- Written by: David Mamet
- Genre: Drama

Premiere
- Date: 2009
- Place: Ethel Barrymore Theatre, New York City, New York
- Directed by: David Mamet

Race is a play by David Mamet that premiered on Broadway in December 2009. Mamet has stated that the intended "theme is race and the lies we tell each other on the subject."

== Plot ==
A racially charged sex crime takes place which leads to charges being made against Charles Strickland, a wealthy resident in his town. He quickly goes to his friend Jack Lawson, a criminal attorney, and retains him to defend his case. Lawson agrees and begins to rely on help from a young black attorney he calls Susan working in his three-lawyer office. As evidence and police reports begin to accumulate for the preparation of the defense of the case, Jack begins to suspect deep flaws in the police investigation of the crime scene. He notes that although the crime reports clearly identify the crime victim as having worn a red sequin dress on the night of the sex crime that something is wrong with the details in the police reports. From his personal experience, he explains to his fellow law office partners (Susan and Brown) how fragile sequin dresses are in general, and how even the slightest incident of jarring or simple out-on-the-town wearing of a sequin dress inevitably leads to sequins popping and falling off almost without any provocation whatsoever. However, the police reports, although otherwise seeming to be thorough, do not mention red sequins being missing or lying around the victim's room in question where an apparent extensive struggle had taken place. The other law partners are impressed by the startling omission, and all three partners come to the conclusion, with increasing and visible confidence before each other, that this omission by the police is very deeply flawed. They are convinced that the credibility of the police reports cannot withstand questioning in the courtroom. All three lawyers feel that their client will be exonerated.

The next day, however, news come to the lawyers that a maid in the hotel has "remembered" that she saw sequins under the bed. In the process of further interviews with his client, discussions with his partner, and with Susan, Jack becomes aware of even further complications in the case. The ethnic prejudices of his old friend whom he is defending turn out to be highly suspect and pejorative. More importantly, he begins to suspect that Susan's hand in the activities taking place in the law office after receiving the case may be tainted. Susan turns out to have strong feelings about racially motivated sex crimes and she is far from unbiased in the representation of the case. As Jack continues to quiz her and challenge her on her own beliefs it becomes clear that Susan had come to play a part in the statement of the maid materialising overnight and invalidating the fragile sequin theory the partners were planning to use. It becomes clear by the final curtain that Susan had leaked the information concerning the basis of Jack's planned defense, the fragile sequin theory, to the police and/or DA. It becomes clear that Susan had done this in order to influence the outcome in a matter of justice involving a question of bigotry and of race.

== Cast and characters ==
- Susan - Kerry Washington, replaced by Afton C. Williamson June 13, 2010
- Henry Brown - David Alan Grier, replaced by Dennis Haysbert June 22, 2010
- Jack Lawson - James Spader, replaced by Eddie Izzard June 21, 2010
- Charles Strickland - Richard Thomas

== Productions ==
Race premiered on Broadway at the Ethel Barrymore Theatre on November 16, 2009, in previews, officially on December 6, 2009, closing on August 21, 2010, after 23 previews and 297 performances. Directed by Mamet, the cast included James Spader, David Alan Grier, Kerry Washington, and Richard Thomas. Scenic design was by Santo Loquasto, lighting design by Brian MacDevitt and costume design by Tom Broecker. David Alan Grier was nominated for a Tony Award for Best Performance by a Featured Actor in a Play. Mamet stated that the intended "theme is race and the lies we tell each other on the subject." The producers announced on April 21, 2010, that the play had recouped its investment, making it the first new play to recoup on Broadway in the 2009–2010 season.

The play has been produced in US regional theatres, such as at the Goodman Theatre in Chicago in 2012 and Next Act in Milwaukee in 2014.

The play made its Canadian premiere in Vancouver in November 2012, produced by Mitch and Murray productions with a cast that included Aaron Craven, Marsha Regis, Craig Erickson and Kwesi Ameyaw. The production was nominated for a Jessie Richardson award for outstanding performance by a supporting actress for Marsha Regis.

Canadian Stage's production ran from April 7 to May 4, 2013, at the St. Lawrence Centre in Toronto, Ontario. The cast included Jason Priestley, Matthew Edison, Nigel Shawn Williams and Cara Ricketts. Williams garnered a Dora Mavor Moore Award nomination for Outstanding Performance by a Male in a Principal Role – Play for his performance.

It was produced in the UK at London's Hampstead Theatre from May 23 to June 29, 2013, directed by Terry Johnson and with a cast comprising Jasper Britton, Charles Daish, Clarke Peters and Nina Toussaint-White.

A French Canadian version has been created in Montreal and run from February 17 to March 26, 2016, at Théâtre Jean-Duceppe.

== Critical reception ==
The play has received mixed reviews. Ben Brantley, in his review for The New York Times, wrote: "Though the first act of Race is similarly propelled by barbed one-liners, its second act offers reassuring evidence of Mr. Mamet’s scalpel-edged intelligence. And the issues it raises, particularly on the ethnic varieties of shame and the universal nature of guilt, should offer ample nutrition for many a post-theater dinner conversation.... Yet despite the tension of its subject, and an abundance of the corkscrew plot twists for which Mr. Mamet is known, Race lacks real dramatic tension." Brantley gives James Spader a rave in his Broadway debut, stating: "Mr. Spader could play Jack with his heavy-lidded eyes closed. He keeps them wide open, and considers every inflection and gesture in creating the one role in Race with more layers than the who’s-scamming-whom plot. He’s good enough to make you wish that Mr. Mamet had given his other actors the same opportunity."

In a 2017 article for The Times Literary Supplement, Jaki Mccarrick said of November, Race, and The Anarchist that "these are state-of-the-nation plays. Each of them is outstanding, and bears Mamet’s trademarks – rhythmic and witty dialogue, erudition, flawless musicality – while being similar in construction and in how their big ideas are explored. They are also sufficiently different to be treated as stand-alone pieces, (though I would be glad to see them performed together)."

== Awards and nominations ==
=== Original Broadway production ===
Year	Award	Category	Nominee	Result
2010	Tony Award	Best Featured Actor in a Play	David Alan Grier	Nominated
