= Snap Decision =

- Genre: Game Show
- Based on: Original Format By Scott St. John
- Written by: Brian B. Ferretti
- Directed by: Rob George
- Presented by: David Alan Grier
- Music by: Tim Mosher and Stoker
- Country of origin: United States
- Original language: English
- No. of seasons: 2
- No. of episodes: 60

Production
- Executive producers: Scott St. John; Lauren Corrao; John Quinn
- Producer: David Alan Grier
- Editor: Simon Laight
- Camera setup: Multi-Camera
- Running time: 20−22 minutes
- Production companies: Entertain the Brutes; Tornante-Sinclair, LLC

Original release
- Network: Game Show Network
- Release: August 7, 2017 – January 26, 2019

Snap Decision is a half-hour American comedy game show featuring David Alan Grier as the host. The show airs on Game Show Network and is also syndicated on Tornante-Sinclair stations. The game show premiered on August 7, 2017.

== Gameplay ==
Three contestants are asked to make "snap judgments" about three strangers in video clips, based on random facts about each, as they compete for a chance at a $10,000 grand prize.

=== Round one ===
After each of the three strangers has self-introduced with a quick sentence or two, the contestants are asked a question (with no clues) about the stranger, which has two choices for the answer. Each contestant locks in with an answer, and then the stranger reveals the correct answer, usually with a short story about the answer. For each correct answer, the contestant is awarded $100. There are two questions for each stranger in this round, for a maximum total for $600.

=== Round two ===
In this round, the contestants are told a fact about one of the strangers, and they must select the stranger, out of a choice of two, who owns that fact. A correct answer here is worth $200. There are three questions in this round, for a maximum of $1,200 after this round. The lowest-ranked contestant is eliminated after this round. In the event of a tie for lowest score, a random question is posed to the tied players (the first tie-breaker question was "Which fruit would David (Alan Grier) rather be?", with choices of "Kiwi" and "Apple"), and the first contestant to buzz in gets to answer. If the player answers incorrectly, they are eliminated from the game. In the case of a three-way tie, if the first question is answered correctly by the player who buzzed in, a second question would be needed (for the remaining tied players).

=== Round three ===
In this round, the remaining contestants each select a different stranger with both strangers answering identical questions in regards to themselves, each with two choices for the answer. The player with the higher money total after round two gets first pick of stranger and answers each question first. In case of a tie, a player is randomly picked (via coin toss) to go first. There are a maximum of three questions to each player in this round, with values of $250 (first), $500 (second) and $750 (third). If a player gets their question correct, the money is added to their score. If they are wrong, their opponent gets the money. Once a player gets to $2,000 or more, they win the game, keep the money, and go on to the final round. The most a contestant can accrue in winnings to this point is $2,700.

=== Final round ===
In the final round, the winner has 45 seconds to match facts with the correct stranger either five or seven times (by episode). If the player accomplishes this, their winnings are increased to $10,000 plus the $2,000 to $2,700 from the main game for a total of $12,000 to $12,700. If the player does not reach the required number of correct answers, they win only the money accrued in the main game.

== Production ==
The series was first announced on June 28, 2017, and premiered on August 7, 2017, with four back-to-back episodes on its first day. Two additional new episodes aired the following day, which the series' regular timeslot. David Alan Grier was chosen to host the show.

In addition to airing first-run episodes on GSN, the series also aired in syndication via Sinclair Broadcast Group.
