= Black Rage (book) =

1968 book by William H. Grier and Price M. Cobbs

- First edition
- Author: William H. Grier; Price M. Cobbs
- Publisher: Basic Books
- Publication date: 1968
- ISBN: 1-57910-349-9
- OCLC: 172989155

Black Rage is a book by psychiatrists William H. Grier and Price M. Cobbs. Released in 1968 after the assassination of Martin Luther King Jr. and the subsequent riots in Washington, D.C., the book received significant attention immediately and in the years since, and led to an ABC television special in 1969 entitled To Be Black.

== The book ==
The book led to the legal concept of black rage, notably proposed as a defense by the defense attorneys representing Colin Ferguson (Ferguson went against the advice of his legal counsel and represented himself, arguing that he was completely innocent of the charges). Its working title was Reflections on the Negro Psyche.

== The authors ==
The authors both were psychiatrists who, in the mid-1960s, founded a clinic in San Francisco and later, authored another book together, The Jesus Bag in 1971.

Price M. Cobbs also wrote an autobiography entitled My American Life: From Rage to Entitlement (ISBN 0-7434-9622-1), about his experiences following the publication of Black Rage. He died on June 25, 2018, at the age of 89. He authored several books and was a resource to many on the topics of understanding cultural stereotyping, prejudice, and race relations.

William H. Grier, who died in 2015, was the father of comedian David Alan Grier.

== The New York Times review ==
After Kenneth B. Clark published a negative review of the book in The New York Times, the authors wrote an editorial, stating "after 62 highly favorable reviews, the 63rd and first critical comment came from a black brother."

== Ties to real-life crimes ==
Serial killer/mass murderer and black extremist Mark Essex idolized the book and adopted its extremist views.

The idea of "black rage" was brought up as a defense at the trial of Colin Ferguson, perpetrator of the 1993 Long Island Rail Road shooting. The defense was rejected and Ferguson was sentenced to over 300 years imprisonment.

== See also ==
- White Rage, a 2016 book about white backlash
