= Charles Pittman =

Charles Pittman may refer to:

- Charles Pittman (politician) (1948–2024), American politician in the state of Mississippi
- Charles Pittman (basketball) (born 1958), basketball player who played for the Phoenix Suns in the NBA
- Charlie Pittman (born 1948), American football player
- Charles H. Pitman (1935-2020), United States Marine Corps general and aviator

== See also ==
- Charles Pitman (disambiguation)
