= Long Island Rail Road shooting =

Shooting in Garden City Park, New York, US

1993 Long Island Rail Road shooting
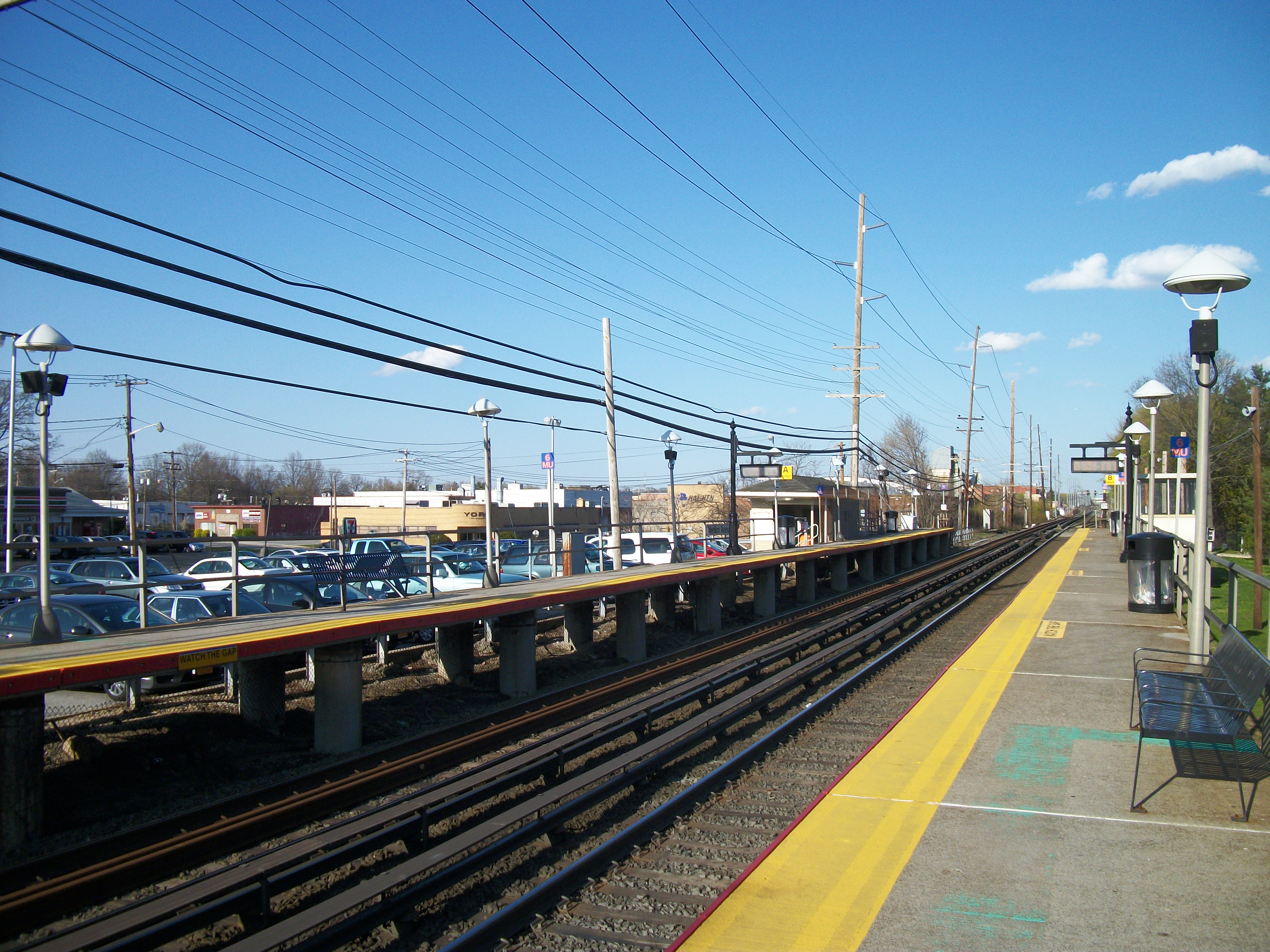
- The Merillon Avenue station (pictured in 2011) where the shooting occurred
- Location: Merillon Avenue, Garden City Park, New York, U.S.
- Date: December 7, 1993; 32 years ago (EST)
- Target: Long Island Rail Road (LIRR) commuters
- Attack type: Mass shooting, mass murder, hate crime
- Weapon: 9mm Ruger P89
- Deaths: 6
- Injuries: 21 (19 by gunfire)
- Perpetrator: Colin Ferguson
- Motive: Anti-white racism
- Verdict: Not guilty on 25 counts of aggravated harassment; Guilty on remaining charges
- Convictions: Second-degree murder (6 counts); Attempted second-degree murder (19 counts); Second-degree criminal possession of a weapon; Third-degree criminal possession of a weapon
- Sentence: Six consecutive life sentences without (Note: With the possibility of parole after 150 years, but this would be at an age when it is guaranteed Ferguson would be dead.) the possibility of parole, plus 165 2/3 years

On December 7, 1993, a mass shooting occurred aboard a Long Island Rail Road (LIRR) train in Garden City Park, New York, United States. As the train arrived at the Merillon Avenue station, passenger Colin Ferguson began firing at passengers with a semi-automatic pistol. Six of the victims were killed and 19 others were wounded before Ferguson was tackled and held down by other passengers on the train.

Ferguson's trial was noted for some unusual developments, including him dismissing his defense counsel, insisting on representing himself and questioning his victims on the stand. He was convicted in February 1995 on six counts of murder and 19 counts of attempted murder, and sentenced to life imprisonment. He is currently incarcerated at Mid-State Correctional Facility, with an earliest possible release date of August 6, 2309.

== Shooting ==
On December 7, 1993, Colin Ferguson boarded the third car of the 5:33 p.m. eastbound Long Island Rail Road (LIRR) train from Penn Station to Hicksville at its origin station, Penn Station in Manhattan, New York, along with more than 80 other passengers. He sat in the southwestern end of the car, carrying a Ruger P89 semi-automatic pistol and a canvas bag filled with 160 rounds of 9 millimeter ammunition.

As the train approached the Merillon Avenue station in Garden City Park, Long Island, Ferguson drew his gun, dropped several cartridges on the floor, stood up, and opened fire at random. During the next three minutes, he killed six people and injured another 19. Some passengers mistook the gunshots for caps or fireworks until a woman shouted, "He's got a gun! He's shooting people!" Ferguson walked east (forward) on the train, pulling the trigger steadily about every half second. Several passengers tried to hide beneath their seats, while others fled to the eastern end of the train and tried to enter the next car. Ferguson walked down the aisle of the train and shot people to his right and left as he passed each seat, briefly facing each victim before firing. An article in The New York Times called Ferguson's actions "as methodical as if he were taking tickets." Ferguson said, "I'm going to get you," over and over as he walked down the aisle.

Other passengers farther away in the train did not realize that a shooting had occurred until after the train stopped, as a crowd of panicked passengers fled from the third car into neighboring cars. One man appeared annoyed by their unruliness and said, "Be calm," before they forced a train door open and fled into the station. Two people were injured in the stampede of passengers. The train's conductor was informed of the shooting, but he decided against opening the train doors right away because two of the cars were not yet at the platform. An announcement was made ordering conductors not to open the doors, but engineer Thomas Silhan climbed out the window of his cab and opened each door from the outside so that panicked passengers could escape.

Ferguson had emptied two 15-round magazines during the shooting. While he was reloading his third magazine, somebody yelled, "Grab him!" Passengers Michael O'Connor, Kevin Blum, and Mark McEntee tackled him and pinned him to one of the train's seats. Several other passengers ran forward to grab his arms and legs and helped to pin him across a three-seat row with his head towards the window and legs towards the aisle. While he was pinned, Ferguson said, "Oh God, what did I do? What did I do? I deserve whatever I get." He also repeatedly pleaded with those holding him, "Don't shoot me. I'm sorry, I'm sorry." Five to six people continued to hold him pinned for several minutes while they awaited relief. Andrew Roderick, an off-duty LIRR police officer who was picking up his wife from the train, then boarded the train and handcuffed him. Of the people who were killed, five died on the day of the shooting while the sixth died five days later. The dead ranged in ages from 24 to 52.

== Victims ==
Six passengers died from their wounds:

- Amy Federici (27), a corporate interior designer from Mineola, New York.
- James Gorycki (51), an account executive from Mineola.
- Maria Theresa Tumangan Magtoto (30), a lawyer from Westbury, New York.
- Dennis McCarthy (52), an office manager from Mineola. His son Kevin was severely wounded. His wife Carolyn McCarthy was elected to the U.S. House of Representatives in 1996.
- Richard Nettleton (24), a college student from Roslyn Heights, New York.
- Mi Kyung Kim (27) from New Hyde Park, New York.

== Investigation ==
Police detectives later said it appeared Ferguson had been planning the shooting for more than a week. LIRR police chief Joseph Flynn said, "This was the work of a deranged, maniacal person who for a variety of reasons decided to explode." Ferguson had expressed racist opinions, specifically against White and Asian people. None of Ferguson's victims were Black, although it was unclear whether any other Black passengers were aboard the train. Ferguson showed no emotion as he sat in the back of a police car, which some passengers said was as shocking and disturbing as the violence of the shooting itself. Upon seeing Ferguson, one of the victims became hysterical and shouted, "How can he be sitting there so calm after everything he did?"

Police found pieces of notebook paper in Ferguson's pockets with scribbled notes with the heading "reasons for this". One of the notes referred to "racism by Caucasians and Uncle Tom Negroes". They included a reference to "the false allegations against me by the filthy Caucasian racist female on the #1 line", a reference to his February 1992 arrest. Ferguson's notes expressed anger towards the New York State Workers' Compensation Board, Asians, Governor Mario Cuomo, and "so-called civil right leaders such as the Rev. Herbert Daughtry, C. Vernon Mason, and Calvin Butts." They also included the names and telephone numbers of the Lt. Governor, the Attorney General, and the Manhattan law firm that Ferguson had previously threatened, whom he referred to as "those corrupt 'black' attorneys who not only refuse to help me but tried to steal my car". The notes indicated Ferguson planned to wait to start the killings until he was beyond the New York City limit out of respect for outgoing Mayor David Dinkins and Police Commissioner Raymond Kelly.

Ferguson showed no remorse during hours of questioning from the Nassau County District Attorney's Office. Officials there said, "He was lucid and clear and aware of what was going on." Ferguson was arraigned on December 8, 1993. He never spoke during the arraignment and did not enter a plea. He was ordered held without bail. As Ferguson was escorted from the courthouse, a reporter asked him if he hated Whites, to which Ferguson replied, "It's a lie".

== Perpetrator ==
Colin Ferguson
- Mugshot of Ferguson in 2003
- Born: January 14, 1958 (age 68); Kingston, Jamaica
- Spouse: Audrey Warren (1986–1988)
- Parent(s): Von Herman Ferguson; May Ferguson
- Status: Incarcerated at Mid-State Correctional Facility
- Convictions: Second degree murder (6 counts); Attempted second degree murder (19 counts); Second degree criminal possession of a weapon Third degree criminal possession of a weapon
- Penalty: 315 years and 8 months to life in prison

Colin Ferguson was born in Kingston, Jamaica, on January 14, 1958 to Von Herman and May Ferguson. Von Herman was a wealthy pharmacist and the managing director of the large pharmaceutical company Hercules Agencies, and was described by Time magazine as "one of the most prominent businessmen in Jamaica". Ferguson attended the Calabar High School in Red Hills Road, Kingston, from 1969 to 1974, where the principal described him as a "well-rounded student" who played cricket and soccer. He graduated in the top third of his class.

Von Herman was killed in a car crash in 1978 when Ferguson was aged 20, and his funeral was attended by government and military luminaries. Ferguson's mother died from cancer soon afterwards, and the deaths destroyed the family's fortunes. Family friends said that this deeply disturbed Ferguson. He moved to the United States in 1982 on a visitor's visa. His friends speculated that he had trouble dealing with racism in the U.S. and that he felt frustrated because he could only find menial jobs.

Ferguson married Audrey Warren on May 13, 1986, a native of Southampton County, Virginia, which qualified him for permanent U.S. residence. The couple moved to a house on Long Island where they often fought, sometimes to the point that police intervention was required. On May 18, 1988, she obtained an uncontested divorce from Ferguson, claiming that the marriage ended because they had "differing social views". Acquaintances said that she left Ferguson because he was "too aggressive or antagonistic" for her, and that the divorce was a "crushing blow" to Ferguson.

Ferguson got a job doing clerical work for the Ademco Security Group in Syosset, New York. He slipped and fell on August 18, 1989, while standing on a stool to reach invoices from a filing cabinet, injuring his head, neck, and back, and the injury led to his termination. Ferguson filed a complaint with the state workers' compensation agency, which reviewed the matter over the next several years. He enrolled at Nassau Community College in East Garden City, where he made the dean's list three times. Also that year, he was forced to leave a class after a disciplinary hearing board found that he had acted aggressively towards the teacher.

In late 1990, Ferguson transferred to Adelphi University in Garden City, where he majored in business administration. He spoke out against coexistence with whites, made calls for retributive revolution, and accused others around him of racism. On one occasion, he complained that a white woman in the library shouted racial epithets at him after he asked her about a class assignment, but an investigation concluded that the incident never occurred. Later, he attended a symposium by a faculty member discussing her experiences in South Africa under apartheid. Ferguson interrupted the professor by shouting, "We should be talking about the revolution in South Africa and how to get rid of the white people" and, "Kill everybody white!" Students and teachers tried to quiet him, but he started threatening them, repeatedly saying, "The black revolution will get you." He was suspended from the school in June 1991 as a result of the threats. He was free to reapply after the suspension, but did not.

In 1991, Ferguson rented a room in Flatbush, Brooklyn. He was unemployed and lived around many other West Indian immigrants. Neighbors said that he dressed very neatly but kept to himself and rarely smiled or spoke to anybody, except occasionally to say hello. "He had delusions of grandeur," his landlord Patrick Denis recounted. "He felt like, 'I'm such a great person. There must be only one thing holding me back. It must be white people.'" In 1992, Ferguson's ex-wife filed a complaint with police alleging that he pried open the trunk of her car. Prior to the shooting, she had not seen him since the divorce.

In February 1992, Ferguson was arrested and charged with harassing a woman on a subway. The woman tried to sit in a vacant seat alongside Ferguson and asked him to move over, prompting him to scream at her and press his leg and elbow against her until police officers pinned him to the ground. Ferguson tried to escape the police and shouted, "Brothers, come help me!" He sent letters to the New York City Police Commissioner and other officials complaining about his arrest, describing it as "viscous [sic] and racist," and claiming that he was brutalized by the officers who arrested him. The New York City Transit Authority investigated and dismissed the claims.

In September 1992, Ferguson was awarded $26,250 for his workers' compensation claim against Ademco Security Group. In April 1993, he insisted that he was still in pain and asked for the case to be reopened so that he could get more money for medical treatment. In the following weeks, Ferguson visited a Manhattan law firm for a consultation, and attorney Lauren Abramson said that she immediately felt uncomfortable and threatened by him. She asked a law clerk to sit in on the meeting because she did not want to be alone with Ferguson, which she had never done before. Ferguson was neatly dressed during the consultation, but he acted strangely and identified himself by a false name before providing his real name. Months later, he made threatening calls to members of the firm, claiming that they were discriminating against him. In one of the calls, he made reference to a massacre which occurred in California. The calls prompted the lawyers to start locking their inner office doors. Ferguson tried to have his workers' compensation claim reopened by the New York State Workers' Compensation Board, which reexamined the case due to his persistence, but it was ultimately rejected. The board placed him on a list of potentially dangerous people security guards were to watch for.

In April 1993, Ferguson moved to California in search of new career opportunities. He unsuccessfully applied for several jobs, including at a car wash where the manager laughed at him. Ferguson bought a Ruger P89 9×19mm pistol at a Turner's Outdoorsman in Long Beach for $400 after waiting the 15-day period required under California's gun laws. He presented himself as a California resident by providing a driver's license that he had received two months earlier, which had an address of the Long Beach motel where he stayed. He had been robbed by two men, so he started carrying the gun with him in a paper bag. Ferguson moved back to New York in May 1993 because, as he told a friend, he did not like competing with immigrants and Hispanics for jobs. His Flatbush landlord said that he appeared even more unstable upon his return, speaking in the third person about "some apocryphal-type doom scenario" which included black people rising up and striking down "their pompous rulers and oppressors." Ferguson started taking five showers a day and could be heard by neighbors repeatedly chanting at night "all the black people killing all the white people." His landlord became increasingly concerned about Ferguson's obsession with racism and apparently growing mental instability, and asked him to move out by the end of the month.

== Litigation ==
=== Pre-trial ===
==== Early court appearances ====
Anthony J. Falanga was appointed Ferguson's attorney on December 11, 1993. Falanga called for his client to receive a psychiatric evaluation. Under New York state law, an insanity defense would require Ferguson's lawyers to prove he suffered from a mental disease or defect and, as a result, could not tell whether his actions were right or wrong. At the time, lawyers and mental health experts said such a defense would be difficult because Ferguson appeared to have carefully planned the attacks, and because he said, "oh God, what did I do" after he was stopped. Media outlets and legal experts at the time speculated a defense could argue Ferguson suffered from paranoia, particularly based on his history of irrational racism allegations and claims that whites were discriminating against him. Ferguson was placed on suicide watch in the Nassau County Jail.

On December 18, 1993 Ferguson asked a judge to let him replace Falanga with Colin A. Moore, a Brooklyn-based attorney with a reputation for pursuing allegations of racism in the criminal justice system. Moore offered to represent Ferguson pro bono. Before a ruling was made on the request, Moore held a press conference announcing he would seek a change of venue to Brooklyn, claiming it was impossible for Ferguson to receive a fair trial in a Nassau court due to a "severe underrepresentation of African-Americans on the Nassau County jury panel." Later, Moore withdrew his offer to represent Ferguson, citing conflicts he did not explain. Ferguson told a judge he questioned Falanga's integrity, disagreed with his handling of the case and had no intention of cooperating with him. Dr. Allen Reichman, a psychiatrist who interviewed Ferguson, indicated in his report that Ferguson may have been feigning mental illness when he spoke of conspiracies against him. Reichman said Ferguson's assertions were "vague and somewhat evasive," in contrast to the normally detailed and highly focused nature of systematized paranoid delusional thinking. On January 5, 1994, a report by a court-appointed psychologist and psychiatrist concluded Ferguson was suffering from paranoid personality disorder but was competent to stand trial.

==== Indictment ====
On January 19, 1994, after three days of evidence presentation, a grand jury handed up a 93-count indictment against Ferguson, which carried the possibility of up to 175 years in prison. Nassau County District Attorney Denis Dillon said of the sentence maximum; "it's not quite infinity, but it will do." Dillon also announced he would not agree to any plea bargain in the case. The indictment included two counts of murder for each slain victim, both for intentional murder and for depraved indifference to human life. It also included 19 counts of attempted murder, 34 counts of assault, criminal possession of a weapon, intent to use the weapon, violation of civil rights of each of the 25 victims and "intent to harass, annoy, threaten and alarm" the victims "because of their race, color or national origin."

On March 1, 1994, William Kunstler and Ron Kuby, law partners known for representing unpopular clients, announced they had accepted a request by Ferguson to handle his case. Kunstler, who said he would not collect a fee for the defense, said Ferguson had been made out to be a "pariah" by the media and public. In April 1994, District Attorney Dillon sought a gag order for all lawyers involved in the case, arguing Kunstler and Kuby had made statements to the media that might be inadmissible during the trial and could influence potential jurors. Kunstler and Kuby argued they would have no problem finding 12 unbiased jurors and claimed Ferguson had already been publicly attacked in the press by government and police officials. Nassau County Judge Donald E. Belfi rejected the gag order on April 23, claiming the impact of inflammatory statements already made by lawyers, politicians and police would fade in the months before the trial began. However, Belfi warned attorneys from both sides to follow a State Court professional disciplinary rule which already limited their comments to news organizations.

==== Prison attacks ====
Shortly after his incarceration began, Ferguson complained about his treatment, claiming correction officers attacked him with milk crates and a fire extinguisher, while depriving him of necessities like soap and antiperspirant spray. Ferguson said: "Of course, there is no sympathy for me in the institution. When I suffered and screamed I was told that it was a good sign by the prison guards because they were hoping for my swift departure from life." Later, Ron Kuby argued Ferguson had been a frequent target of harassment at the Nassau County jail, and requested that the United States Department of Justice intervene to ensure Ferguson's safety.

On March 23, 1994, while returning to his cell from the medical unit, Ferguson was attacked in jail by a group of inmates. Ferguson suffered a broken nose and a swollen left eye. Prison officials had been notified by Kuby that an assault was imminent, and were in the process of following up on the warning when Ferguson was attacked. Kuby, who said he had been warned of the attack by another inmate, stated "the word was out. Everyone in the institution knew he was going to be set up." Kuby called the attack racially motivated, and later alleged some jail officials and guards had advance knowledge of the impending assault. Five inmates were charged with second-degree assault for their connection in the attack.

In November 1994, Ferguson's lawyers claimed prison guards taunted him with claims that the election of Governor George Pataki, a death penalty supporter, meant Ferguson would be executed if found guilty. Ferguson's lawyers claimed prison guards showed him the headlines of newspaper stories about Pataki and claimed Ferguson was "headed for electrocution sometime soon." Ferguson was deeply troubled by the claims, despite assurances from his attorneys that the death penalty could only be imposed in crimes committed after a capital punishment bill became law. Ferguson was not reassured until after a judge told him the same thing, at the request of Kunstler.

==== "Black rage" defense ====
Kunstler and Kuby proposed an innovative defense: Ferguson had been driven to temporary insanity by a psychiatric condition they termed "black rage". Kunstler and Kuby argued Ferguson had been driven insane by racial prejudice and could not be held criminally liable for his actions, even though he had committed the killings. The attorneys compared it to the utilization of the battered woman defense, posttraumatic stress disorder, and the child abuse syndrome in other cases to negate criminal liability. Kuby said the notes carried by Ferguson on the day of his arrest demonstrated that Ferguson was motivated by rage during the shootings. Donald E. Belfi, the Nassau County Judge assigned to the Ferguson case, criticized Kunstler for speaking to the media about the proposed defense before it had been examined by a mental health professional. Belfi said "Mr. Kunstler may have many talents, but until he receives his medical degree with a specialty in psychiatry, these types of conclusions should best be left for medical experts and the triers of the facts."

Black rage was first proposed by psychologists William Henry Grier and Price Cobbs in their 1968 book Black Rage (ISBN 1-57910-349-9). Grier and Cobbs argue that black people living in a racist, white supremacist society are psychologically damaged by the effects of racist oppression. They argue that this damage causes black people to act abnormally in certain situations.

Ferguson started to claim he was not involved in the Long Island Rail Road shootings at all, and repeatedly refused to meet with a psychiatrist chosen by Kunstler and Kuby. Ferguson told the attorneys he was receiving messages straight from God, and spoke of conspiracies to destroy him by those opposed to God. On August 12, 1994, Kunstler and Kuby asked Judge Belfi to reconsider Ferguson's competence to stand trial, claiming he was growing more delusional, paranoid and obsessive by the day, and that he was too mentally unbalanced for them to mount any kind of defense. George Peck, the prosecutor in Ferguson's trial, insisted Ferguson's apparent lack of cooperation with his lawyers was a defense tactic to avoid a trial.

On August 20, 1994, Ferguson appeared before Belfi and rejected his lawyer's efforts to have him declared mentally unfit to stand trial. Ferguson spoke in a long and rambling manner, occasionally ignoring Belfi when the judge tried to interrupt him. Ferguson claimed a police officer who escorted him from the Nassau County Jail said to him, "You realize someone else, in fact, was actually responsible for the shooting." When asked if Ferguson understood the role of the prosecuting attorney, Ferguson replied; "to perpetrate injustices against me". Kunstler and Kuby argued Ferguson's behavior was indicative of his mental imbalance, but Belfi refused the lawyers' request to reconsider his competence, citing the original psychiatric report that concluded Ferguson was able to understand the charges against him and was "malingering in an attempt to create an impression" that he was mentally imbalanced and unable to cooperate with his attorney. When Belfi ended the proceeding, Ferguson tried to continue talking. After he was placed into handcuffs by guards, Ferguson shouted "they have made it too tight," collapsed to the floor, and had to be dragged from the courtroom. Denis Dillon suggested Kunstler was trying to create "such a bizarre situation" that the court would reverse its earlier ruling regarding Ferguson's competence.

==== Removal of Kunstler and Kuby ====
On September 20, 1994, Kunstler and Kuby filed notice that they would pursue an insanity defense despite the objections of their client. Ferguson continued to claim he was not involved in the shootings and proposed defending himself during the trial. In the following months, Ferguson sent Judge Belfi several letters regarding disputes between Ferguson, Kunstler and Kuby. Ferguson claimed in the letters that he was not insane, and rejected Kunstler's and Kuby's "black rage" defense. Although George Peck argued the letters proved Ferguson was able to understand the charges against him and was actively participating in his defense, Kuby argued the letters only further demonstrated Ferguson's confused state of mind. On November 11, Ferguson agreed he would stop resisting efforts to meet with a court-appointed psychiatrist. As a result, Judge Belfi agreed to hold a third hearing as to whether Ferguson was mentally competent to stand trial.

On December 10, 1994, Judge Belfi ruled Ferguson was competent to stand trial. Belfi said he based his decision in part on his conversations with Ferguson in the courtroom, including Ferguson's concern over Governor Pataki's promise to sign a death-penalty bill. Belfi strongly advised Ferguson against defending himself, but Ferguson said he intended to do so anyway. Kuby said of the decision, "What we will have now is a complete circus. A crazy man cannot defend himself. Mr. Ferguson, evidence to the contrary, believes he is not guilty and that someone else killed all those people aboard the train." Kuby continued, "Without a psychiatric defense, Ferguson has no defense. There was no doubt that he was there, that he fired the weapon, that he would have fired it more had he not been wrestled to the ground. There is no doubt that Colin Ferguson, if sane, was guilty."

=== Trial ===
During his trial Ferguson cross-examined the police officers who arrested him, and victims he had shot. The trial was broadcast live by local media and Court TV, but was overshadowed by the O. J. Simpson murder case, going on simultaneously on the West Coast.

Ferguson argued that the 93 counts he was charged with were related to 1993, and had it been 1925 he would have been charged with only 25 counts. He admitted bringing the gun onto the train, but claimed he fell asleep and another man grabbed his gun and began firing. He also argued of a mysterious man named Mr. Su, who had information concerning a conspiracy against him. He found another man who was willing to testify that the government had implanted a computer chip in Ferguson's brain, but at the last minute decided not to call him to the stand. This was Raul Diaz, a parapsychologist from Manhattan who claimed during a press conference on the courthouse steps to have witnessed an Asian man press a chip into Ferguson's head prior to the attack. According to Diaz, the Asian man told him to behold what he was about to do prior to pushing the button. "He was lasered out by a remote-control device," Diaz told reporters outside the courtroom. "He was zapped, just like that, right out of the twilight zone" and was "commanded to go up and down the aisle shooting people."

His cross-examination questions mostly started with "is it your testimony..." and would force the witness to repeat testimony already given. When a witness refused to answer the question to his satisfaction, he would often ask the judge to "admonish the witness to answer the question." During the course of his cross-examinations, Ferguson would refer to himself in the third person, particularly asking the victims of the shooting, "did you see Colin Ferguson..." to which the witness would reply, "I saw you shoot me." Legal experts pointed out that Ferguson's questions were pointless and were not geared towards rebutting testimony. By not recognizing when to object to testimony and closing arguments, he lost his right to appeal on those grounds. Among the defense witnesses Ferguson requested was President Bill Clinton.

Ferguson originally sought to question himself on the witness stand, but ultimately did not. He told the judge and media that he intended to call witnesses who would prove his innocence, including a ballistic expert, a handwriting expert and two eyewitnesses, but they were afraid to come forward and take the stand. He did not call any of the witnesses. He also told Judge Belfi of an alleged conspiracy by the Jewish Defense League to kill him in prison if he was convicted. He said the prison slaying of serial killer Jeffrey Dahmer was "set up as a prelude against me."

=== Conviction ===
Ferguson was convicted on February 17, 1995, of murder of the six passengers who died of their injuries. He was also convicted of attempted murder for wounding 19 passengers. On March 22, he received 315 years and eight months to life, meaning his current earliest possible parole date is August 6, 2309. The judge said, "Colin Ferguson will never return to society, and will spend the rest of his natural life in prison." At the sentencing, Judge Donald E. Belfi called Ferguson a "selfish, self-righteous coward." He also used the sentencing as an opportunity to criticize New York's controversial Sentencing Cap Law, which would have capped each of Ferguson's sentences at 50 years and required that they all be served concurrently had no one died in the massacre, since all of the felonies he committed on the train were part of one occurrence. After his conviction, Ferguson was put in the position to argue in appellate briefs that he had incompetent counsel (himself).

After his sentencing, Ferguson was incarcerated for a time at the Attica Correctional Facility in upstate New York. He is currently at Mid-State Correctional Facility, near Utica.

== Lawsuits ==
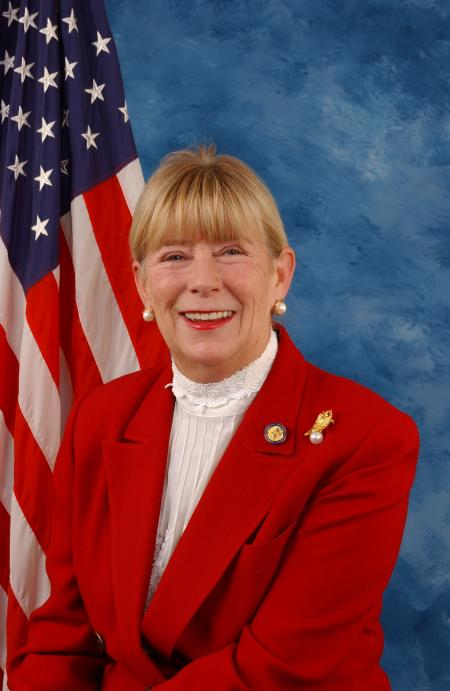
Carolyn McCarthy, wife of victim Dennis McCarthy, was elected to the United States House of Representatives after running on a platform of gun control.

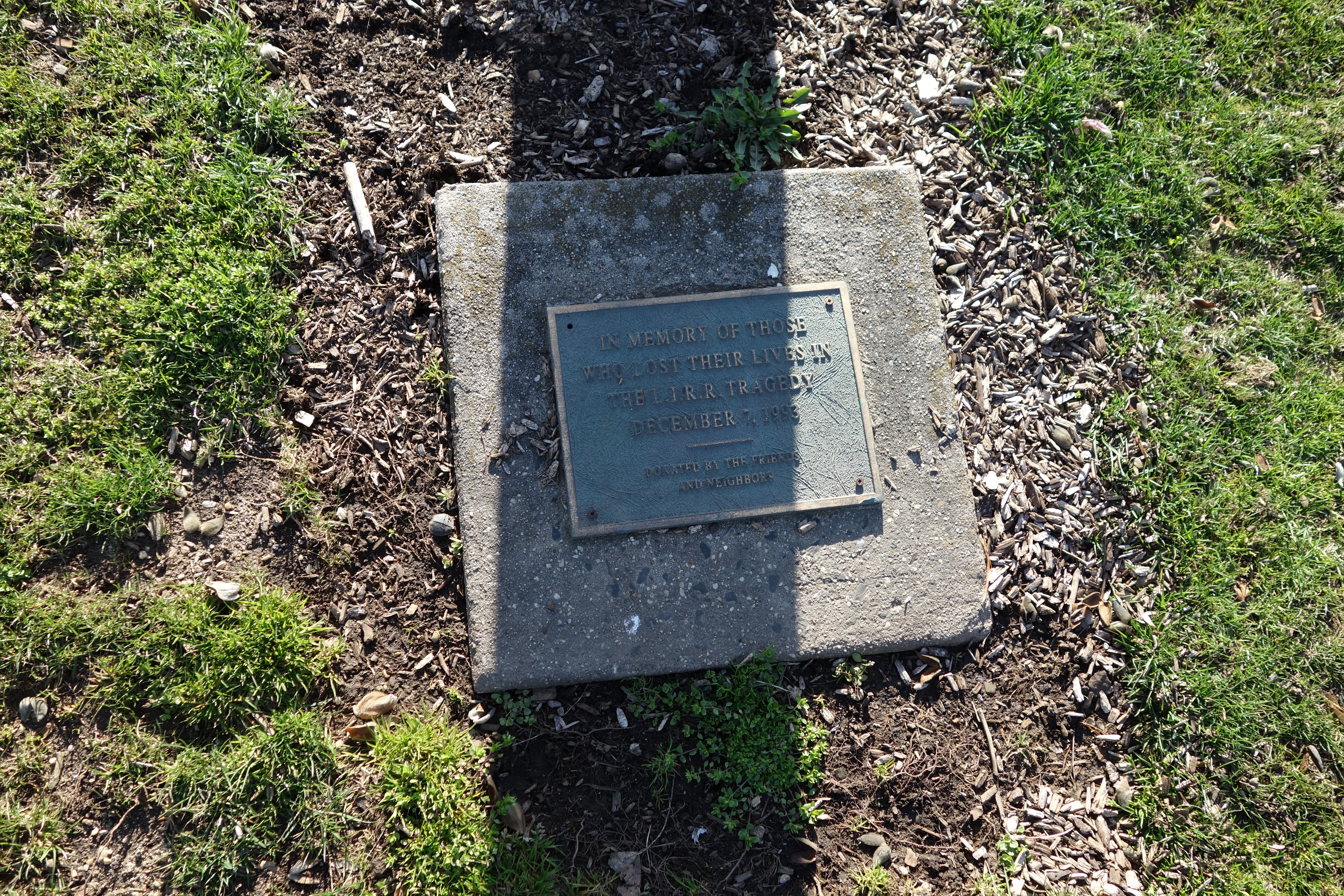
A memorial to the shooting in nearby Mineola, New York

Carolyn McCarthy — whose husband Dennis McCarthy was killed by Ferguson, and whose son Kevin McCarthy was severely injured by a bullet that passed through his hand and entered his head, destroying 10 percent of his brain — was subsequently elected to the United States Congress on a platform of gun control. She was motivated to run for Congress after the representative in her district, Dan Frisa, voted against an assault weapons bill. Some of Ferguson's other victims and their family members have also become involved in gun control efforts.

McCarthy also sued Olin Corporation, the parent of Winchester Ammunition, under products liability and negligence theories for their manufacture of the Black Talon bullets used by Ferguson. The cartridges carry hollow-tipped bullets that expand upon impact, increasing the severity of wounds. One month before the LIRR shooting, Winchester Ammunition announced they were voluntarily withdrawing the Black Talon cartridges from the market. McCarthy's suit failed, partly because New York State law placed no responsibility on manufacturers for the criminal misuse of their products.

At least a half-dozen lawsuits related to the shootings were filed against the Long Island Rail Road and its parent company, the Metropolitan Transportation Authority. Carolyn McCarthy filed a $36 million damage lawsuit against the two entities, claiming they failed to provide adequate protection for passengers and should have installed metal detectors and used undercover police officers. The suit sought $1 million for Dennis McCarthy's pain and suffering, $10 million for his death and for damages to survivors, and $25 million for injuries to Kevin McCarthy.

== Reaction ==
Many African-Americans expressed concern that the LIRR shooting would lead to a backlash of violence and racial animosities against the black community. Civil rights activists Al Sharpton and Herbert Daughtry urged that African-Americans in general not be blamed for the crime; Sharpton, in particular, criticized what he called attempts "to demonize black and Hispanic dissatisfaction" by linking those groups to the murders. Civil rights activist Jesse Jackson delivered a sermon at the Cathedral of the Incarnation in Garden City, during a service attended by the victims' grieving families. Audrey Warren released a statement shortly after the shootings expressing sorrow for the victims and their families. Jackson stressed the shootings were the result of one man and should not be seen as indicative of all African-Americans. The day after the shootings, Nassau County Executive Thomas Gulotta called Ferguson "an animal." Jackson and other African-American leaders criticized the comment as racially charged, but Gulotta later said his statement had nothing to do with race.

During a press conference in the days after the shooting, the Long Island Rail Road Police Benevolent Association called the trains "unsafe" and said the railroad needed to triple the size of its 216-person police force. LIRR officials responded by noting that the rate of crime against passengers had dropped over the past few years before the shooting. The Long Island Rail Road and Metro-North Commuter Railroad placed more officers on trains and increased the visibility of police in response to the shootings. LIRR officials also made counselors available for passengers who wanted one, and sent senior railroad officials out to trains to answer riders' questions. A New York Times editorial called for stronger gun control laws in response to the murders, specifically citing the ease with which Ferguson obtained a handgun in California, which had one of the country's stricter gun laws. Several Adelphi University students expressed concern that Ferguson may have been taking the train to the school with plans of shooting people out of revenge for his past experiences there, although the train Ferguson took was not the closest one to Adelphi. Most of the regular commuters who used the 5:33 Hicksville local returned to the train the day after the shootings. In interviews with the media, a number of passengers cited the need to face their fears and the psychological trauma created by the incident, rather than avoid riding their regular train.

=== Politicians ===
President Bill Clinton took notice of the LIRR shooting, calling it a "terrible human tragedy". The day after the shooting, Clinton announced he had asked Attorney General Janet Reno to review a proposal by New York City Mayor-elect Rudy Giuliani that would set up a national uniform licensing system for gun buyers. Clinton cited the Ferguson murders as a factor in his support of the program, which would include background checks, tests and required renewals every two years. About one week after the shooting, Clinton visited with O'Connor, Blum and McEntee. During his first major speech since his election as mayor, Giuliani cited the Ferguson murders while he repeated his previous calls for the death penalty and a uniform gun licensing law. During his monthly radio call-in show, Governor Mario Cuomo called the Ferguson shootings "a dramatic, spectacular slaughter", and called for stronger gun control measures. U.S. Senator Al D'Amato said the Ferguson case demonstrated the need for capital punishment in New York State because "that is the only fitting punishment for this cold-blooded killer".

== See also ==
- 1984 New York City Subway shooting
- 2022 New York City Subway attack
- 2024 Chicago train shooting
- List of rampage killers (religious, political, or ethnic crimes)
- The Long Island Incident
