= White Rage =

2016 book by Carol Anderson

White Rage: The Unspoken Truth of Our Racial Divide
- Author: Carol Anderson
- Language: English
- Subject: White backlash, white identity politics
- Published: 2016
- Publisher: Bloomsbury Publishing
- Publication place: United States
- Media type: Print, e-book
- Pages: 246 pp
- Awards: National Book Critics Circle Award
- ISBN: 978-1-63286-412-3 (Hardcover)
- OCLC: 959941616

White Rage: The Unspoken Truth of Our Racial Divide is a 2016 nonfiction book by Emory University Professor Carol Anderson, who was contracted to write the book after reactions to an op-ed that she had written for The Washington Post in 2014.

== Summary ==
Anderson details her thesis of white backlash in the United States and states that structural racism has brought about white anger and resentment. Her analysis of American history is that whenever African Americans gained social power, there was considerable backlash. She describes the Jim Crow era as a reaction to the end of the American Civil War and to the Reconstruction era. She further describes the shutdown of schools in response to the Brown v. Board of Education, ruling of the US Supreme Court and the opposition to the Voting Rights Act of 1965 as causes of the Southern Strategy and the war on drugs, which she says were both attempts to disenfranchise black voters.

== Reception ==
White Rage became a New York Times Best Seller, and was listed as a notable book of 2016 by The New York Times, The Washington Post, The Boston Globe, and the Chicago Review of Books. White Rage was also listed by The New York Times as an Editors' Choice, and won the 2016 National Book Critics Circle Award for Criticism.

At the January 2017 confirmation hearing for Republican Senator Jeff Sessions, candidate for U.S. Attorney General, Democratic Senator Dick Durbin offered Sessions a copy of White Rage, saying "I'm hoping he'll take a look at it".

== See also ==
- Angry white male
- Right-wing populism#United States
- Trumpism
  - Birtherism
  - Racial views of Donald Trump
- Black Rage
