= David Alan Grier =

American comedian and actor (born 1956)

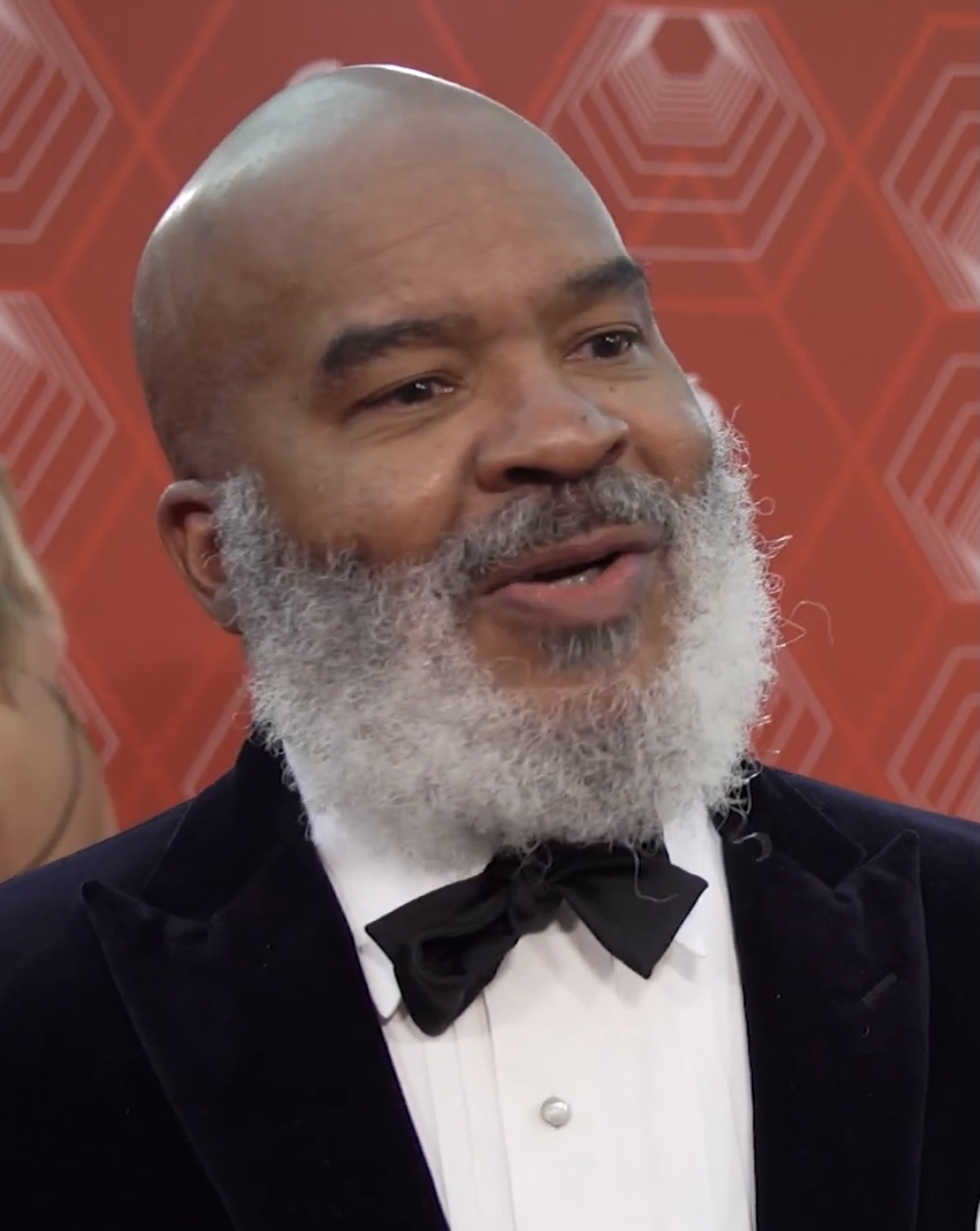
- Grier in 2021
- Born: June 30, 1956 (age 70); Detroit, Michigan, U.S.
- Education: University of Michigan (BA); Yale University (MFA)
- Occupations: Actor; comedian
- Years active: 1977–present
- Spouse(s): Maritza Rivera (div. 1997) Christine Y. Kim (m. 2007; div. 2009)
- Children: 1
- Website: davidalangrier.net

David Alan Grier (born June 30, 1956) is an American actor and comedian. Known for his roles on stage and screen, Grier gained popularity playing multiple roles in the American sketch comedy television series In Living Color (1990–1994) and Reverend Leon Lonnie Love on the Fox comedy series Martin (1993–1997). In 2004, Grier was ranked No. 94 on Comedy Central's 100 Greatest Stand-Ups.

Grier made his feature film debut in the Robert Altman directed drama Streamers (1983) for which he won the Volpi Cup for Best Actor at the Venice Film Festival. Grier then took roles in films such as A Soldier's Story (1984), Boomerang (1992), Jumanji (1995), Baadasssss! (2003), Bewitched (2005), They Cloned Tyrone (2023), The Color Purple (2023), and The American Society of Magical Negroes (2024).

On stage, Grier won the Tony Award for Best Featured Actor in a Play for his role in the Broadway revival of A Soldier's Play (2021). He was Tony-nominated for his roles as Jackie Robinson in The First (1983), Henry Brown in Race (2009) and Sporting Life in Porgy and Bess (2012). Other Broadway roles include in Dreamgirls (1981), and A Funny Thing Happened on the Way to the Forum (1996).

He has worked extensively in television playing roles such as Bernard on Damon (1998), Jerome Dagget on DAG (2000–2001), David Bellows on Life with Bonnie (2002–2004), Joe Carmichael on The Carmichael Show (2015–2017), the Lion in The Wiz Live! (2015), and Hal on A Series of Unfortunate Events (2018). He also created and executive-produced the American satirical show Chocolate News (2008) for Comedy Central. He currently plays Ron on the NBC sitcom St. Denis Medical (2024–present).

== Early life and education ==
Grier was born in Detroit, Michigan, one of three children, to Aretas Ruth (née Blaney), a school teacher, and William Henry Grier, a psychiatrist and writer, who co-wrote the 1968 book Black Rage.

He attended Roeper City and Country School in Bloomfield Hills, Michigan for 2nd grade in 1962 and may have been there earlier and later but this elementary school year is confirmed. He graduated from Detroit's Cass Technical High School, received a B.A. in radio, television and film from the University of Michigan in 1978, and an M.F.A. from the Yale School of Drama, in 1981. Visiting lecturer Rachel Roberts took notice of his performance one evening in a piece entitled The Place of the Spirit Dance.

== Career ==
=== 1981–1989: Broadway debut and early roles ===
After graduating from Yale, Grier landed the role of Jackie Robinson in the short-lived Broadway musical The First, directed by Martin Charnin and written by Joel Siegel. Grier was nominated for a Tony Award for Best Featured Actor in a Musical and won the Theatre World Award for The First. He got his start on the National Public Radio radio drama adaptation of Star Wars: The Empire Strikes Back in 1981. He was the voice of a nameless X-wing fighter pilot during the Battle of Yavin.

Grier later starred as James "Thunder" Early in the hit Broadway musical Dreamgirls. Grier made his film debut in 1983 in Streamers, directed by Robert Altman. He won the Golden Lion for Best Actor at the Venice Film Festival for the film. He appeared in the Negro Ensemble Company production A Soldier's Play and reprised his role in the film version A Soldier's Story. Grier appeared as a geology professor at Hillman College in the show A Different World.

=== 1990–1999: Career breakthrough ===
Although primarily known for his dramatic work, Grier began to shift towards comedy, making appearances in the cult films Amazon Women on the Moon and I'm Gonna Git You Sucka, whose director Keenen Ivory Wayans cast Grier in his new variety show In Living Color. It became a ratings hit and won an Emmy for Outstanding Variety Series. Grier became a popular cast member through his characters, which ranged from hyperactive children to crotchety old men. Some of his more well-known characters were flamboyant and effeminate Antoine Merriweather in the "Men on..." sketch series, blues musician Calhoun Tubbs (based on Shakey Jake, a busker who often performed near the Michigan campus) megaphone-blaring shop teacher Al MacAfee, the elderly Mr. Brooks, and Tiny, a prison inmate obsessed with female "breastesses". He also provided impersonations of Joe Jackson and Ike Turner.

After his success on In Living Color, Grier began appearing in film comedies such as Boomerang, as Eddie Murphy's shy friend Gerard in 1992; Blankman, with Damon Wayans, in 1994; In the Army Now, as Fred Ostroff with Pauly Shore and Andy Dick, also in 1994; and as Carl Bentley, a factory employee turned police officer whose car is crushed and eaten by a giant pod in Jumanji in 1995. He played Rev. Leon Lonnie Love on the TV series Martin. Grier appeared with Tom Arnold in the 1997 comedy McHale's Navy as Ensign Charles Parker. Grier returned to Broadway to perform in the musical A Funny Thing Happened on the Way to the Forum in 1997.

In 1998 Grier hosted the game show Random Acts of Comedy on Fox Family, what is now Freeform. The show lasted one season. That same year he co-starred with Jon Stewart in Elmopalooza, as the director of Stewart's production crew, who he often chastises at Elmo and Telly after realizing what happened to the rest of the cast. In 1999, he made a guest appearance as himself in the "Aw, Here it Goes to Hollywood" episode of Nickelodeon's sitcom Kenan & Kel. After the cancellation of In Living Color, Grier starred in the short-lived sitcoms The Preston Episodes.

=== 2000–2019: Continued work ===
Grier is a comedian and hosted the Comedy Central series Premium Blend in 2001. He made an appearance on the Dave, Shelley, and Chainsaw (DSC) Show (San Diego Jack 100.7 FM) on October 5, 2012, before doing performances at The Madhouse Comedy Club. In the interview, he debunked internet reports that he was involved in a musical based on the life of Louis Farrakhan. He took a leading role in DAG and had a cameo in the Robert De Niro and Edward Burns film 15 Minutes (2001) as a Central Park mugger. In a departure from the comedic roles he played on In Living Color, he portrayed an abusive father in Rusty Cundieff's anthology film Tales from the Hood. In 2002, Grier joined the cast of the improv-based ABC sitcom and Bonnie Hunt vehicle Life with Bonnie which ran for two seasons. During this time, he continued to appear in comedy films but also returned to drama in the films Baadasssss! (2003) and The Woodsman (2004). He starred in his own Comedy Central stand-up special The Book of David: The Cult Figure's Manifesto. He is also a frequent guest on the Comedy Central show Crank Yankers.

Grier was the host of the NBC show Thank God You're Here. He starred in Gym Teacher: The Movie (2008) playing the villain, Shelly Bragg. He appeared as Uncle Henry in the ABC 2005 television film The Muppets' Wizard of Oz. Grier guest starred in Season 6 of Fox's Bones. He played Professor Bunsen Jude, the Science Dude, the host of a children's television program. This character was inspired by Bill Nye "the Science Guy". In May 2013, Grier appeared in Tyler Perry Presents Peeples, playing the role of Virgil Peeples, alongside Kerry Washington and Craig Robinson. Also in 2013, Grier appeared in The Watsons Go To Birmingham, a Hallmark Channel adaptation of Christopher Paul Curtis' 1995 Newbery Honor-winning novel, The Watsons Go to Birmingham – 1963. He appeared on the CBS TV-adaptation of Bad Teacher, playing the role of principal Carl Gaines.

In 2008, Grier starred in the Comedy Central series Chocolate News which had satirical sketches about current events and news stories. It lasted for one season of ten episodes. Grier appeared as Jimmy Dale in the series Queen Sugar appearing in Season 3 and played the role of Mr. Packard in the Paramount Pictures film Clifford the Big Red Dog. He returned to Broadway for the premiere of Race, written and directed by David Mamet, opposite James Spader, Kerry Washington, and Richard Thomas, which opened at the Ethel Barrymore Theatre on December 6, 2009. Grier received his second Tony nomination for the role. He also appeared in the revival production of The Wiz at the La Jolla Playhouse directed by Des McAnuff. He was a contestant on the eighth season of Dancing with the Stars, partnered with Kym Johnson. By the fourth week of the competition, Grier announced that he had lost 26 pounds. He was eliminated in the fifth week. His first book Barack Like Me: The Chocolate-Covered Truth was published by Simon & Schuster in 2009. The book recounts Grier's own life story, and was written with Alan Eisenstock. Grier appeared on Broadway as Sportin' Life in the Gershwins' Porgy and Bess, which opened at the Richard Rodgers Theatre on January 12, 2012, alongside Norm Lewis and Audra McDonald. He was nominated for the Tony Award for Best Performance by a Featured Actor in a Musical for this role. In addition to his Tony Award nomination, Grier received a 2013 Grammy nomination for Best Musical Theater Album for his performance on the cast recording of the play. He played the Cowardly Lion in NBC's live performance of The Wiz, which aired on December 3, 2015.

He appeared in an episode of Clean House along with his brother and his brother's family. Grier invited the show to help his brother due to his severe problems with clutter, and the family received a home makeover. He hosted the game show Snap Decision, which debuted August 7, 2017, on the Game Show Network and many Sinclair TV stations.

=== 2020–present ===
In January 2020, Grier returned to the stage for the Broadway production of A Soldier's Play, this time playing Tech Sergeant Vernon C. Waters, the role originated by Adolph Caesar in the off-Broadway production. For this role, he won the Tony Award for Best Featured Actor in a Play.

In April 2022, it was announced that Grier would join the cast of the 2023 musical remake, The Color Purple. He plays Pastor Avery, the father of Shug Avery, a role also in the 1985 film of the same name. In 2022, he starred in The Patient on Hulu with Steve Carell. He was the announcer for the 96th Academy Awards, held on March 10, 2024. That same year he starred in the satirical film The American Society of Magical Negroes, which received negative reviews. Of the film Grier said, "Some members of the white community will see it and say, ‘We’re tired of hearing about race.’ Well we're tired of talking about it. We're tired! We're tied, too. We all want to get past this, but you can only get past it by going through it."

Grier currently stars on NBC's hit comedy, St. Denis Medical. The show was recently renewed for a third season.

== Personal life ==
Grier was married to Maritza Rivera and divorced in 1997. In July 2007, he married Christine Y. Kim, an associate curator of the Los Angeles County Museum of Art. She gave birth to their daughter, Luisa Danbi Grier-Kim on January 10, 2008, at Cedars-Sinai Medical Center, in Los Angeles. On July 9, 2009, Kim filed for divorce, citing irreconcilable differences.

When Grier was young, his family marched with Martin Luther King Jr. in a March on Poverty in Detroit, where King gave an early version of the "I Have A Dream" speech.

He is a fan of motorcycles, and owns the rare Yamaha YZF-R1 Limited Edition. On the August 10, 2009, episode of The Adam Carolla Show, Grier agreed to auction it to aid Bryan Bishop's Tumor Fund, but subsequently walked out of the studio. He is an avid cook and began food blogging during the run of the play Race, where James Spader helped to critique the food Grier made.

== Acting credits ==
=== Film ===
Year	Title	Role	Notes
1983	Streamers	Roger	
1984	A Soldier's Story	Corporal Cobb	
1985	Beer	Elliott Morrison	
1987	From the Hip	Steve Hadley	
1987	Amazon Women on the Moon	Don 'No Soul' Simmons	
1988	Off Limits	Rogers	
1988	Me and Him	Peter Conklin	
1988	I'm Gonna Git You Sucka	Newsman	
1990	Loose Cannons	Drummond	
1990	Almost an Angel	Det. Bill	
1992	The Player	Himself	
1992	Boomerang	Gerard Jackson	
1994	In the Army Now	Fred Ostroff	
1994	Blankman	Kevin Walker	
1995	Tales from the Hood	Carl	
1995	Jumanji	Carl Bentley	
1995	Goldilocks and the Three Bears	Spike	
1997	McHale's Navy	Ensign Charles Parker	
1997	Top of the World	Detective Augustus	
1998	Elmopalooza	Himself	
1999	Freeway II: Confessions of a Trickbaby	Mr. Butz	
1999	Stuart Little	Red	Voice
2000	3 Strikes	Detective Jenkins	
2000	Return to Me	Charlie Johnson	
2000	The Adventures of Rocky and Bullwinkle	Measures	
2001	15 Minutes	Mugger in Central Park	
2003	Baadasssss!	Clyde Houston	
2003	Blue Collar Comedy Tour: The Movie	Himself, Announcer	
2003	Tiptoes	Jerry Robin Jr.	
2004	The Woodsman	Bob	
2005	Bewitched	Jim Fields	
2006	Little Man	Jimmy	
2008	Kissing Cousins	The Griller	
2008	The Hustle	Rev. Isaac Montgomery Paid	
2008	The Poker House	Stymie	
2008	An American Carol	Rastus Malone	
2009	Dance Flick	Sugar Bear	
2009	Astro Boy	Mr. Squirt, Math Cowboy, Boxer Robot	Voice
2010	Something Like a Business	3D	
2011	Hoodwinked Too! Hood vs. Evil	Moss the Troll	Voice
2013	Peeples	Virgil Peeples	
2015	Road Hard	Michael	
2017	The Big Sick	Andy Dodd	
2018	Arizona	Coburn	
2018	Sprinter	Coach	
2019	Native Son	Marty	
2020	Coffee & Kareem	Captain Hill	
2021	Clifford the Big Red Dog	Mr. Packard	
2023	They Cloned Tyrone	The Preacher	
2023	Candy Cane Lane	Santa Claus	
2023	The Color Purple	Reverend Avery	
2024	The American Society of Magical Negroes	Roger	

=== Television ===
Year	Title	Role	Notes
1985	The Equalizer	Desk Sergeant	Episode: "The Lock Box"
1986	All Is Forgiven	Oliver Royce	Main cast
1987	CBS Summer Playhouse	Deter Phibin	Episode: "Kingpins"
1987	A Different World	Prof. Bryan Walcott	Episode: "Romancing Mr. Stone"
1988	Tour of Duty	Harold	Episode: "Soldiers"
1988	Duet	Gordon	Episode: "Oh My God, I Left the Baby on the Bus"
1988	Tanner '88	Secret Serviceman	Episode: "Child's Play" & "The Great Escape"
1988	Baby Boom		Episode: "Pilot"
1988	The Dictator		Episode: "Reading, Writing and Rebellion"
1989	ALF	FBI Agent No. 1	Episode: "Wanted: Dead or Alive"
1990	Equal Justice	Stone	Episode: "A Sucker's Bet"
1990–1994	In Living Color	Various Roles	Main cast
1993–1997	Martin	Reverend Leon Lonnie Love	Recurring cast
1995	Saturday Night Live	Himself, Antoine Meriweather	2 episodes
1995	Dream On	Marshall	Episode: "Take Two Tablets, and Get Me to Mt. Sinai"
1995	The Preston Episodes	David Preston	Main cast
1995	Pinky and the Brain	Marlon	Voice, episode: "TV or Not TV"
1995–1997	Happily Ever After: Fairy Tales for Every Child	Bongo, Dudley Bear	Voice, 2 episodes
1998	Damon	Bernard	Main cast
1998	Cosby	Gil	Episode: "Chemistry"
1998	Hercules	Memnon	Voice, 2 episodes
1999	A Saintly Switch	Dan Anderson	Television film
1999	The '60s	Fred Hampton	Television film
1999	Kenan & Kel	Himself	Episode: "Aw, Here It Goes To Hollywood : Part 2"
2000	Angels in the Infield	Bob Bugler	Television film
2000	The X-Files	Cinema Audience	Episode: "Hollywood A.D."
2000	Buzz Lightyear of Star Command	Tubunch	Voice, episode: "Stress Test"
2000–2001	DAG	Jerome Dagget	17 episodes
2002	King of Texas	Rip	Television film
2002	Sesame Street	Aladdin	Episode: "#33.45"
2002	Boston Public	Laurence Williams	Episode: "Chapter Forty-Two"
2002	The Proud Family	Reuben	Voice, episode: "Behind Family Lines"
2002–2004	Life with Bonnie	David Bellows	44 episodes
2002–2020	Crank Yankers	Various voices	20 episodes
2003	Samurai Jack	Da Samurai	Voice, episode: "Samurai Versus Samurai"
2003–2005	My Wife and Kids	Jimmy Geller	3 episodes
2005	The Muppets' Wizard of Oz	Uncle Henry	Television film
2007	Thank God You're Here	Host	7 episodes
2008	Chocolate News	Host	10 episodes
2010	Bones	Professor Bunsen Jude	Episode: "The Body and the Bounty"
2010	Law & Order: Special Victims Unit	Jeremy Swift	Episode: "Branded"
2013	The Cleveland Show	Ebert Williams	Voice, episode: "The Hangover: Part Tubbs"
2013	Happy Endings	Terry Chuckles	Episode: "In the Heat of the Noche"
2013	Randy Cunningham: 9th Grade Ninja	Rudd Rhymez	Voice, episode: "Hip Hopocalypse Now"
2014	The Soul Man	Jesse	Episode: "Obama Drama"
2014	Bad Teacher	Carl Gaines	13 episodes
2014	Black Dynamite	Doctor	Voice, episode: "How Honeybee Got Her Groove Back or Night of the Living Dickheads"
2014–2015	Comedy Bang! Bang!	Network President	Recurring role; 5 episodes
2015–2017	The Carmichael Show	Joe Carmichael	Main cast; 32 episodes
2015	The McCarthys	Dr. Hugh Morris	Episode: "Family Therapy"
2015	The Tonight Show Starring Jimmy Fallon	Ben Carson	Episode: "Vin Diesel/Selena Gomez"
2015	Cutthroat Kitchen	Himself, Judge	Episode: "Taco Dirty to Me"
2016	The Eric Andre Show	Himself, David Alan Thicke	Episode: "Dennis Rodman; Haley Joel Osment"
2017–2019	Snap Decision	Host	60 episodes
2017	A Christmas Story Live!	Santa Claus	Live performance
2018	A Series of Unfortunate Events	Hal	2 episodes
2018–2019	The Cool Kids	Hank	Main role
2019	Catastrophe	Tim Cabot	Episode #4.6
2019	Queen Sugar	Jimmy Dale	3 episodes
2019	The Resident	Lamar Broome	Recurring role; 3 episodes
2019–2022	A Black Lady Sketch Show	Preacher, Pastor	3 episodes
2020	At Home with Amy Sedaris	Pippen	Episode: "Inspiration"
2021	Dad Stop Embarrassing Me!	Pops Dixon	Main role
2021	Joe Pickett	Vern Dunnegan	Main role
2022	That Damn Michael Che	Pilot	Episode: "Higher Power"
2022	Central Park		Voice, episode: "Lunar Palaver"
2022	The Patient	Charlie Addison	Recurring role; 5 episodes
2022	Beauty and the Beast: A 30th Celebration	Cogsworth	Television special
2024	96th Academy Awards	Announcer/Self	Award ceremony
2024	St. Denis Medical	Ron	Main role
2025	Elsbeth	Arthur Greene Jr.	season 2 episode 17 "Four Body Problem"

=== Video games ===
Year	Title	Role	Notes
2020	Samurai Jack: Battle Through Time	Da Samurai	

=== Radio ===
Year	Title	Role	Notes
1983	Star Wars: The Empire Strikes Back	Various voices	Episode: "Freedom's Winter" & "Dark Lord's Fury"

=== Theater ===
Year	Title	Role	Notes
1981	The First	Jackie Robinson	
1982	Dreamgirls	James Thunder Early	Replacement
1982	A Soldier's Play	Private C.J. Memphis	Replacement
1983	Richard III	Murderer, Richmond	
1994	The Merry Wives of Windsor	Master Frank Ford	
1996	One Touch of Venus	Whitelaw Savory	
1997	A Funny Thing Happened on the Way to the Forum	Pseudolus, Prologus	Replacement
2006	The Wiz	The Wiz	
2009	Race	Henry Brown	
2012	Porgy and Bess	Sporting Life	
2015	The Wiz Live!	Cowardly Lion, Robert the Farmhand Man No. 2	
2018	Annie	Oliver "Daddy" Warbucks	Hollywood Bowl
2020	A Soldier's Play	Sergeant Vernon C. Waters	

== Awards and nominations ==
Year	Awards	Category	Title	Outcome
1982	Tony Awards	Best Featured Actor in a Musical	The First	Nominated
1983	Venice Film Festival	Volpi Cup for Best Actor	Streamers	Won
1999	NAACP Image Awards	Outstanding Supporting Actor in a Comedy Series	Damon	Nominated
2003	NAACP Image Awards	Outstanding Supporting Actor in a Comedy Series	Life with Bonnie	Nominated
2004	Satellite Awards	Best Supporting Actor – Television Series	Life with Bonnie	Nominated
2010	Tony Awards	Best Featured Actor in a Play	Race	Nominated
2012	Tony Awards	Best Featured Actor in a Musical	Porgy and Bess	Nominated
2013	Grammy Awards	Best Musical Theater Album	Porgy and Bess	Nominated
2016	Black Reel Awards	Outstanding Supporting Actor, TV Movie or Limited Series	The Wiz Live!	Nominated
2016	Critics' Choice Television Awards	Best Supporting Actor in a Movie/Miniseries	The Wiz Live!	Nominated
2016	NAACP Image Awards	Outstanding Actor in a Television Movie, Mini-Series or Dramatic Special	The Wiz Live!	Won
2020	Drama League Award	Distinguished Performance Award	A Soldier's Play	Nominated
2020	Drama Desk Award	Outstanding Featured Actor in a Play	A Soldier's Play	Nominated
2020	Outer Critics Circle Award	Outstanding Featured Actor	A Soldier's Play	Won
2021	Tony Awards	Best Featured Actor in a Play	A Soldier's Play	Won
2025	Critics' Choice Television Awards	Best Actor in a Comedy Series	St. Denis Medical	Pending
2025	NAACP Image Awards	Outstanding Supporting Actor in a Motion Picture	The American Society of Magical Negroes	Nominated
