= Price M. Cobbs =

Author and Activist

- Born: November 2, 1928; Los Angeles, California, U.S.
- Died: June 25, 2018 (aged 89); Philadelphia, Pennsylvania, U.S.
- Education: University of California, Berkeley (BA); Meharry Medical College (MD)
- Occupations: Psychiatrist; civil rights leader; author; management consultant
- Spouse(s): Evadne Priester (died 1973); Frederica Maxwell Cobbs
- Children: 2
- Parent(s): Peter Price; Rosa Mashaw

Price Mashaw Cobbs, M.D. (November 2, 1928 – June 25, 2018) was an American psychiatrist, civil rights leader, author and management consultant. He published extensively about racism and created a clinical model called Ethnotherapy. He was one of the founders of the African American Leadership Institute Anderson School of Business at UCLA and a Life Member of the NAACP. He co-authored two books with William Grier, Black Rage and The Jesus Bag and co-authored Cracking the Corporate Code with Judith L. Turnock.

He was born on November 2, 1928, in Los Angeles to Rosa Mashaw and Peter Price. His father was a physician. He received his B.A. from the University of California, Berkeley and his M.D. from Meharry Medical College. He was married to Evadne Priester and they lived in San Francisco. She died in 1973, leaving him and two children. He remarried with Frederica Maxwell Cobbs and lived in San Francisco until his death in 2018. He died in Philadelphia, where he had traveled for his grandson's high school graduation.
