= Donald E. Belfi =

American judge (1936–2020)

Judge
- In office 1975 – 14 February 2005

Donald E. Belfi (January 21, 1936 – February 26, 2020) was an American lawyer, judge, and politician in Nassau County, New York.

In 1994, he presided over the trial of Long Island Rail Road shooter Colin Ferguson.

== Early life ==
Born in 1936 in Brooklyn, New York, Belfi gained his BA in English from Georgetown University in 1957 and Doctor of Jurisprudence from Fordham University School of Law in 1960. At Fordham, he was selected by New York County District Attorney Frank Hogan to join his office upon graduation, as part of the Honor's Program.

== Career ==
From 1960 to 1962, he served as an Assistant District Attorney in Manhattan, and from 1962 to 1974 he served as an Assistant District Attorney in Nassau County. In 1975, he was elected to the Nassau County District Court bench on the Republican and Conservative tickets. He was re-elected in 1980 on the Democratic, Republican, Conservative, and Liberal tickets. He was elected to the County Court of Nassau County in 1984, re-elected in 1994, and ran unsuccessfully for re-election in 2004 on the Republican and Conservative tickets. After leaving public service Belfi joined the Manhattan practice of Murray, Frank & Sailer LLP as senior counsel.

At his retirement from the bench on 14 February 2005, Carolyn McCarthy paid tribute to him in the House of Representatives. McCarthy's husband and son were both shot by Ferguson in 1994.

His voluntary activities included serving as commissioner of Rockville Centre Little League, and as a member of the Knights of Columbus, the Association for the Help of Retarded Children, and the St. Agnes Cathedral Parish Council. He also contributed over 20 years to Georgetown University as both an interviewer and a recruiter for the school. His honors included the Fraternal Order of Court Officers Bench and Bar Award, the Criminal Courts Bar Association's Norman F. Lent Award, the Fordham Law Alumni Association Distinguished Alumnus Award, the DeStefano Industries Annual Award, and the Court Officer's Benevolent Association of Nassau County Fidelis Juris Award.
