= Charles H. Pitman =

USMC Lieutenant General (1935–2020)

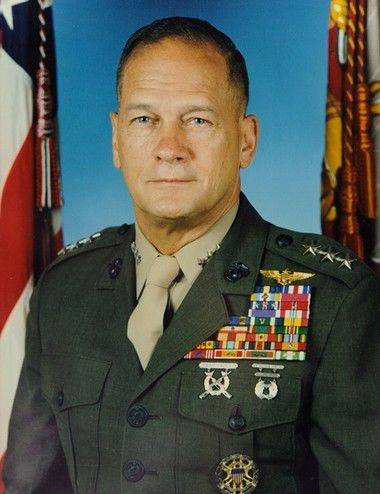
- Born: 20 October 1935; Chicago, Illinois, U.S.
- Died: 13 February 2020 (aged 84); Fort Worth, TX, U.S.
- Military career
- Allegiance: United States
- Branch: United States Marine Corps
- Service years: 1955–1990
- Rank: Lieutenant General
- Nickname: Chuck
- Commands: 1st Marine Aircraft Wing; Marine Aviation Training Support Group 21; Marine Aircraft Group 36; H&MS-16
- Conflicts: Vietnam War
- Awards: Navy Distinguished Service Medal; Silver Star; Defense Superior Service Medal (2); Legion of Merit; Distinguished Flying Cross (4); Bronze Star Medal; Purple Heart

Charles Henry Pitman Sr. (20 October 1935 – 13 February 2020) was a lieutenant general in the United States Marine Corps who served as Deputy Chief of Staff for Aviation. He was also involved in the 1980 Operation Eagle Claw. Pitman retired in 1990 and died of cancer in 2020.

== 1973 shooting ==
On January 7, 1973, Mark Essex went on a racially motivated killing spree targeting White people in New Orleans, eventually culminating in a standoff in which he retreated to and barricaded himself in a concrete stairwell enclosure on the roof of a high-rise hotel. Lt. Colonel Pitman commandeered a CH-46 military helicopter to assist police, conducting landings near the hotel to transport armed officers, and conducting numerous strafing runs over the roof of the hotel, in which the officers inside the helicopter and Essex exchanged many rounds over many hours. Shortly before 9 p.m., after all negotiation and communication tactics had failed, and after spending almost seven hours crouched in the cubicle, Essex suddenly charged into the open with his rifle at waist height and his right fist aloft, shouting "Come and get me!" before being almost immediately shot by police sharpshooters positioned on the roofs of adjacent buildings. From Pitman's helicopter, which had just approached to begin another strafing operation, scores of rounds were fired into Essex's body; the impulse of the bullets' impact propelled his body several feet vertically before Essex fell on his back approximately twenty feet from the cubicle. The barrage of gunfire would continue for almost four minutes. An autopsy later revealed Essex had received more than 200 gunshot wounds. No police officers were wounded and/or killed in the hotel rooftop standoff.

== Shooting aftermath ==
The United States Marine Corps considered a court-martial for Charles Pitman for taking the helicopter without prior approval. However, New Orleans–based Representative F. Edward Hébert, then chairman of the House Armed Services Committee, recommended the issue be dropped.

Moon Landrieu, then mayor of New Orleans, later stated, "Without that helicopter and without his piloting, it would've been a lot worse. The city owes him a debt of gratitude."

Antoine Saacks, a former police officer who boarded Pitman's helicopter that day, said, "I always say the true heroes were Chuck and his crew, undoubtedly. I have a tremendous amount of respect for the man that's unwavering."

== See also ==
- Mark Essex
