= Bernard C. Smith =

American politician

Member of the New York State Senate from the 2nd district
- In office January 1, 1966 – December 31, 1978
- Preceded by: Norman F. Lent
- Succeeded by: James J. Lack

Personal details
- Born: July 29, 1923 Barnesboro, Pennsylvania
- Died: October 19, 1993 (aged 70) Kingston, New York
- Party: Republican

Bernard C. Smith (July 29, 1923 – October 19, 1993) was an American lawyer and politician from New York.

== Life ==
He was born on July 29, 1923, in Barnesboro, Cambria County, Pennsylvania. He attended Northport High School. During World War II he served in the U.S. Army, attaining the rank of lieutenant. After the war he graduated from Cornell University, and in 1949 from Cornell Law School. He practiced law in Northport. In 1949, he married Elizabeth Reynolds (1924–1998), and they had five children.

Smith was an assistant district attorney of Suffolk County from 1951 to 1958, Chief Assistant D.A. from 1959 to 1961; and D.A. from 1962 to 1965.

He was a member of the New York State Senate from 1966 to 1978, sitting in the 176th, 177th, 178th, 179th, 180th, 181st and 182nd New York State Legislatures.

On November 1, 1979, he was appointed by Governor Hugh Carey as a member of the New York State Commission of Investigation.

In 1990, he ran on the Republican ticket for New York Attorney General, but was defeated by the incumbent Democrat Robert Abrams.

Smith died while on vacation in the Catskill Mountains on October 19, 1993, in Kingston Hospital in Kingston, New York, of a brain tumor; and was buried at the Northport Rural Cemetery.

== Sources ==
Party political offices
Preceded by Peter King	Republican nominee for Attorney General of New York; 1990	Succeeded by Dennis Vacco
New York State Senate
Preceded by Norman F. Lent	New York State Senate; 2nd District; 1966–1978	Succeeded by James J. Lack
