= 1982 New York Attorney General election =

1982 New York Attorney General Election
- November 2, 1982
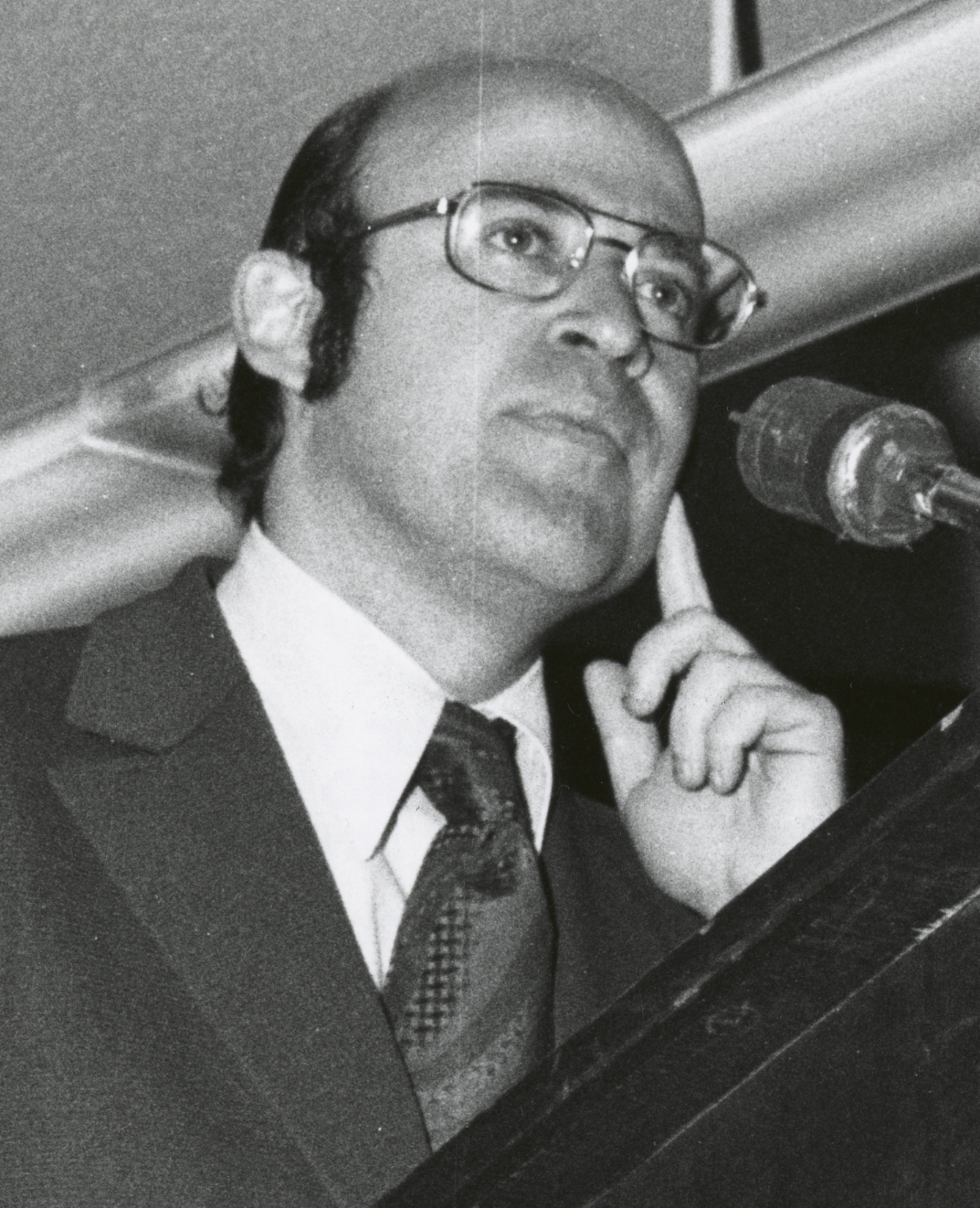

Nominee	Robert Abrams	Frances A. Sciafani
Party	Democratic	Republican
Alliance	Liberal	Conservative
Popular vote	3,056,950	1,560,474
Percentage	64.44%	32.90%
New York Attorney General before election
Robert Abrams
Democratic
Elected New York Attorney General
Robert Abrams
Democratic

The 1982 New York State Attorney General election took place on November 2, 1982, in order to elect the Attorney General of New York. Democratic nominee and incumbent Attorney General Robert Abrams won re-election against Republican nominee Frances A. Sciafani, Right to Life nominee Kevin P. McGovern and Libertarian nominee Dolores Grande.

== General election ==
On election day, November 2, 1982, Democratic nominee Robert Abrams won re-election by a margin of 1,496,476 votes against his foremost opponent Republican nominee Frances A. Sciafani, thereby retaining Democratic control over the office of Attorney General. Abrams was sworn in for his second term on January 3, 1983.

=== Results ===
1982 New York State Attorney General Election
Party	Candidate	Votes	%
Democratic	Robert Abrams	2,921,394	61.58%
Liberal	Robert Abrams	135,556	2.85%
Total	Robert Abrams (Incumbent)	3,056,950	64.44%
Republican	Frances A. Sciafani	1,381,997	29.13%
Conservative	Frances A. Sciafani	178,477	3.76%
Total	Frances A. Sciafani	1,560,474	32.90%
Right to Life	Kevin P. McGovern	101,357	2.14%
Total	Kevin P. McGovern	101,357	2.14%
Libertarian	Dolores Grande	24,925	0.53%
Total	Dolores Grande	24,925	0.53%
Total votes		4,743,706	100.00%
