= Alan Hochberg =

American politician

Alan Hochberg is an American lawyer and politician from New York.

== Life ==
Hochberg was born in New Jersey. He graduated A.A.S. from New York City Community College and a BBA from the University of Miami. Then he worked as an investigator for the U.S. Department of Justice. He graduated LL.B. from New York Law School, and was admitted to the bar. He was an Assistant D.A. of Bronx County, and entered politics as a Democrat. He married Faye Kronstadt, and they had two sons.

On February 17, 1970, he was elected to the New York State Assembly, to fill the vacancy caused by the election of Robert Abrams as Bronx Borough President. Hochberg was re-elected several times and remained in the Assembly until 1976, sitting in the 178th, 179th, 180th and 181st New York State Legislatures. In June 1973, he ran in the Democratic primary for Borough President of the Bronx but was defeated by the incumbent Abrams.

In February, 1976 Hochberg was indicted for official misconduct. It was alleged that Hochberg offered a $20,000-a-year job in the State Legislature to Charles Rosen, the leader of the Co-op City rent strike, in exchange for Rosen's withdrawal from the Democratic primary election for Hochberg's Assembly seat, scheduled to happen later that year. On February 25, 1976 he was arraigned in the New York Supreme Court. On April 30, Hochberg moved for a dismissal of the charges, but four of the five counts of the indictment were upheld by Justice William Crangle on July 7. On November 2, Hochberg was re-elected to the Assembly. On December 15, he was convicted of the attempt to fraudulently and wrongfully affecting the results of a primary election (under the Penal and the Election Law), of corrupt use of position or authority (under the Election Law), and of unlawful fees and payments (under the Public Officers Law), the latter two crimes being felonies. He did not take his seat in the 182nd New York State Legislature. On January 26, 1977, he was sentenced to one year in prison and thus lost his Assembly seat. On April 5, 1977, he was disbarred by the Appellate Division. On April 13, 1978, Hochberg's appeal was rejected by the Appellate Division.

Later he moved to Westchester County, and became active in the Scarsdale Jewish congregation.

New York State Assembly
Preceded by Robert Abrams	New York State Assembly; 81st District; 1970–1977	Succeeded by Eliot Engel
