= 1986 New York Attorney General election =

1986 New York Attorney General Election
- November 4, 1986
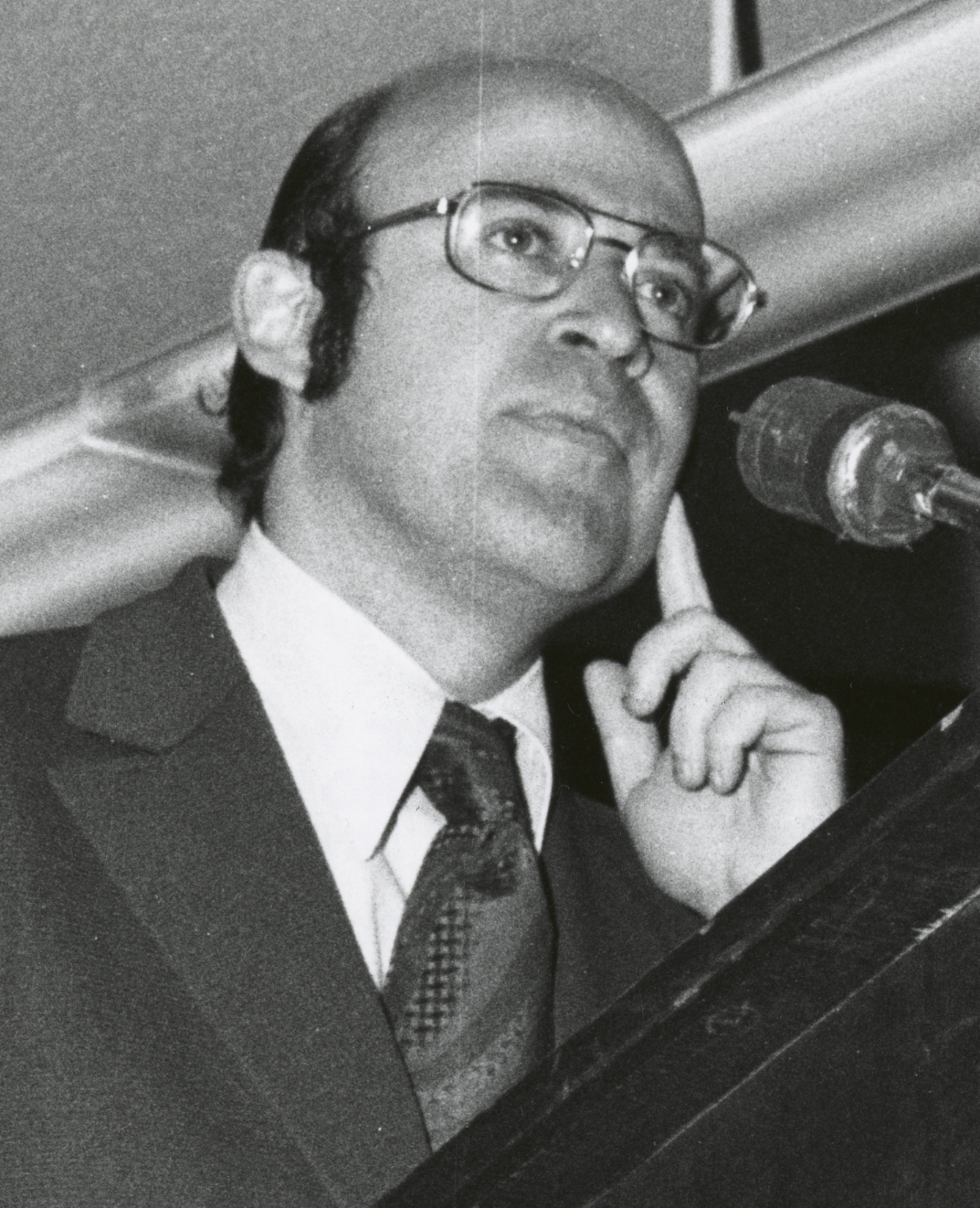

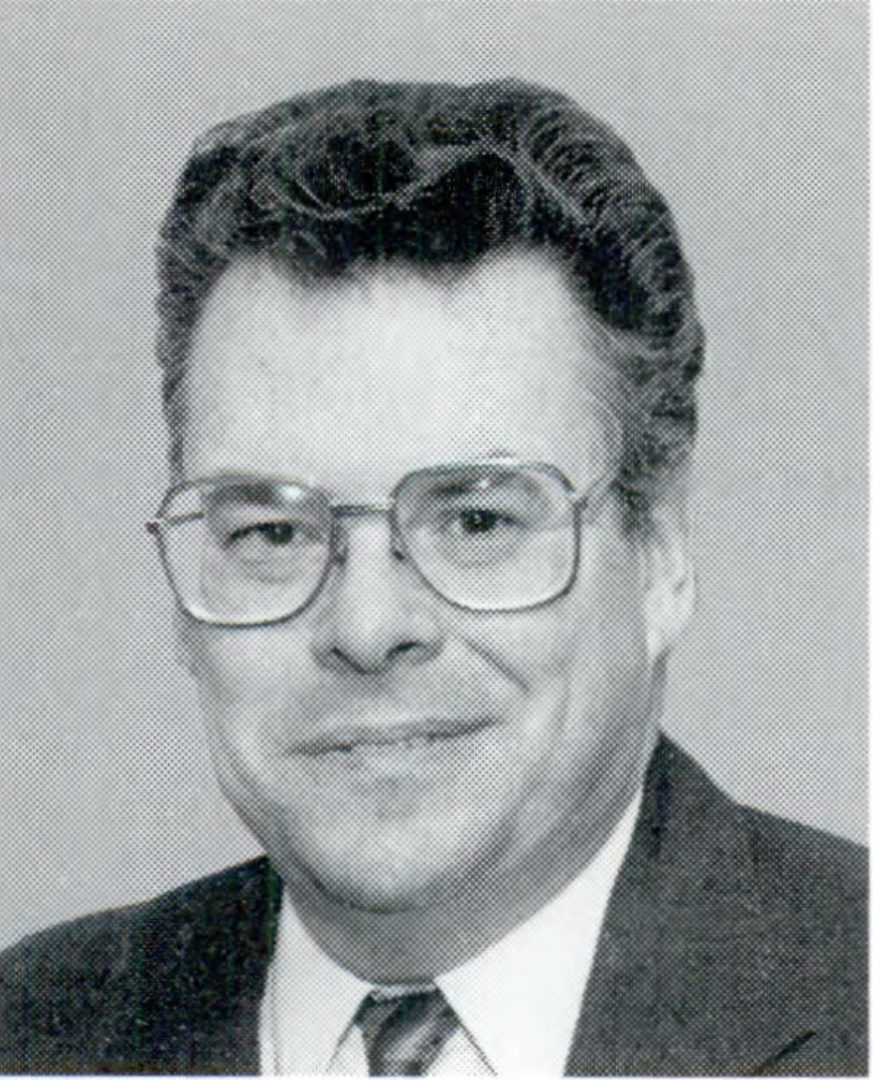
Nominee	Robert Abrams	Peter King
Party	Democratic	Republican
Alliance	Liberal	Conservative Right to Life
Popular vote	2,548,386	1,344,344
Percentage	65.13%	34.36%
- County results Abrams: 40–50% 50–60% 60–70% 70–80% 80–90% King: 50–60%
New York Attorney General before election
Robert Abrams
Democratic
Elected New York Attorney General
Robert Abrams
Democratic

The 1986 New York State Attorney General election took place on November 4, 1986, to elect a candidate to the position of Attorney General. Democratic nominee and incumbent Attorney General Robert Abrams defeated Republican nominee Peter T. King, resulting in the re-election of Abrams to the position of Attorney General.

== General election ==
=== Candidates ===
- Robert Abrams, incumbent Attorney General (Democratic)
- Peter T. King, Nassau County comptroller (Republican)
- Mary Fridley (New Alliance)

=== Results ===
A total of 568,888 blank, void, and scattering votes are not counted for in the election box below.

1986 New York State Attorney General Election
Party	Candidate	Votes	%
Democratic	Robert Abrams	2,420,501	61.86%
Liberal	Robert Abrams	127,885	3.27%
Total	Robert Abrams (Incumbent)	2,548,386	65.13%
Republican	Peter King	1,099,066	28.09%
Conservative	Peter King	139,964	3.58%
Right to Life	Peter King	105,314	2.69%
Total	Peter King	1,344,344	34.36%
New Alliance	Mary Fridley	20,100	0.51%
Total	Mary Fridley	20,100	0.51%
Total votes		3,912,829	100%
