= Peter King (American politician) =

American politician (born 1944)

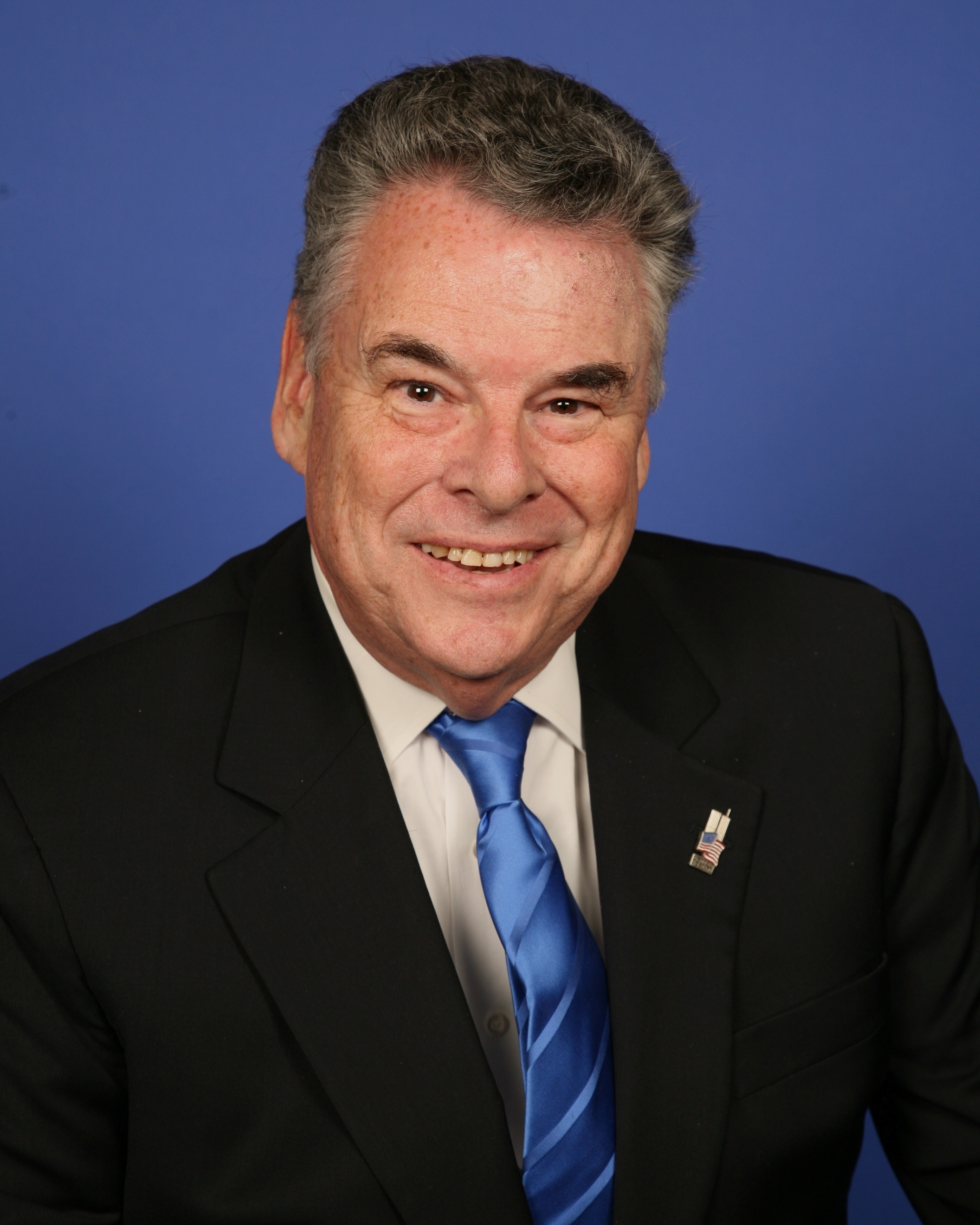
- Official portrait, 2010

Chair of the House Homeland Security Committee
- In office January 3, 2011 – January 3, 2013
- Preceded by: Bennie Thompson
- Succeeded by: Michael McCaul
- In office August 2, 2005 – January 3, 2007
- Preceded by: Christopher Cox
- Succeeded by: Bennie Thompson

Ranking Member of the House Homeland Security Committee
- In office January 3, 2007 – January 3, 2011
- Preceded by: Bennie Thompson
- Succeeded by: Bennie Thompson

Member of the U.S. House of Representatives from New York
- In office January 3, 1993 – January 3, 2021
- Preceded by: Robert J. Mrazek
- Succeeded by: Andrew Garbarino
- Constituency: 3rd district (1993–2013); 2nd district (2013–2021)

Comptroller of Nassau County
- In office January 1, 1982 – January 3, 1993
- Preceded by: Hallstead Christ
- Succeeded by: Alan Gurein

Personal details
- Born: Peter Thomas King; April 5, 1944 (age 82) New York City, New York, US
- Party: Republican
- Spouse: Rosemary Wiedl (m. 1967)
- Children: 2
- Education: St. Francis College (BA); University of Notre Dame (JD)
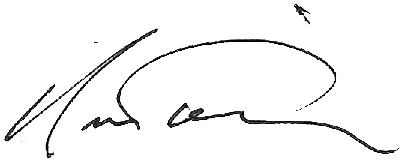
- Signature

Military service
- Branch/service: United States Army
- Years of service: 1968–1974
- Rank: Specialist 5
- Unit: 69th Infantry Regiment; New York
- King's voice King supporting the Promoting Antiterrorism Capabilities Through International Cooperation Act. Recorded September 26, 2006

Peter Thomas King (born April 5, 1944) is an American former politician and novelist who represented New York in the U.S. House of Representatives from 1993 to 2021. A member of the Republican Party, he represented a South Shore Long Island district that includes parts of Nassau County and Suffolk County and was numbered as the 3rd and later the 2nd district.

King was formerly chair of the House Committee on Homeland Security. He stepped down because of Republican conference term limits, but remained a member of the committee. On November 11, 2019, King announced he would not seek re-election in the 2020 elections and would retire after his current term expired. He resigned from the Financial Services Committee on January 15, 2020. King also previously served on the House Permanent Select Committee on Intelligence.

King's professional papers are held at the University of Notre Dame Archives.

== Early life, family, education and military career ==
King was born in the New York City borough of Manhattan and raised in the Sunnyside neighborhood in nearby Queens. He is the son of Ethel M. King (née Gittins) and Peter E. King, a New York City police officer. His paternal grandparents were Irish immigrants from the island of Inishbofin in County Galway. His maternal grandfather was Welsh, and his maternal grandmother was also Irish, from County Limerick.

King graduated from St. Francis Preparatory School. He graduated from St. Francis College in 1965 with a B.A. in political science, and earned his J.D. from Notre Dame Law School in 1968. That same year, he began service in the 165th Infantry Regiment of the New York Army National Guard. He worked for the Nassau County district attorney's office until 1974, when he was honorably discharged from the 165th infantry regiment.

King and his wife, Rosemary, reside in Seaford, New York, and have two adult children. His daughter, Erin King Sweeney, served on the town council for Hempstead, New York.

King is Roman Catholic.

== Political career ==
King first sought public office in 1977, running for an at-large seat on the Hempstead, New York town council and winning with the backing of the then-powerful Nassau County Republican Party machine led by Joseph Margiotta. In 1981, he successfully ran for Nassau county comptroller, again with Margiotta's support. The next year, when several prominent Republican politicians, led by then senator Alfonse D'Amato, sought to displace Margiotta, King joined them in this internal Republican dispute; at one point, he was the only Nassau politician to do so. King was re-elected in 1985 and 1989. As comptroller, he displayed independence, often criticizing the budget proposals of county executives Francis Purcell and Thomas Gulotta, both Republicans.

King ran for attorney general of New York in 1986, and won the Republican primary after Ulster County District Attorney E. Michael Kavanagh dropped out to run for lieutenant governor. However, he was defeated by a large margin by incumbent Democratic attorney general Robert Abrams.

King was first elected to the US House of Representatives in 1992. When Democratic Party Rep. Robert Mrazek announced his short-lived 1992 US Senate candidacy against Republican incumbent Al D'Amato, King ran for the 3rd district congressional seat that had been held by Mrazek. Despite being outspent 5-to-1, King won 49.6% to 46.5%. From 1993 to 2008, he sometimes faced only token opposition, while in other races, he ran against candidates who could self-finance their campaigns. Although King was outspent in those races, he won by double-digit margins.

In 2006, Nassau county legislator Dave Mejias challenged King. While some pundits believed this race would be close due to dissatisfaction with George W. Bush, King defeated Mejias 56% to 44%. King again sought re-election to Congress in 2008. The Democrats fielded 25-year-old newcomer Graham Long in a long-shot bid to defeat King. King won the 2008 election with 64% of the vote.

In 2013, St. John's University honored King with a Doctor of Laws degree, and he gave their commencement address. He was recognized for assisting New York City following Hurricane Sandy.

=== Potential bids for US Senate and presidency ===
King had contemplated running for Senate in 2000 against Hillary Clinton, and even created an exploratory committee in 2003 to challenge Chuck Schumer. On both occasions he ultimately decided not to pursue the challenge.

After briefly contemplating running for governor of New York in 2010, King announced that he was seriously considering running for US Senate in a special election for the last two years of the term won in 2006 by Hillary Clinton, who had been appointed US secretary of state. When Kirsten Gillibrand, the representative of New York's 20th congressional district, was appointed to fill the seat by David Paterson, King initially said he would consider holding off on making a run for the seat. However, two days after the Gillibrand pick, King demanded Paterson justify his selection of the congresswoman, saying there were more qualified candidates. In August 2009, King ruled out a Senate run; however, in January 2010, he said he was reconsidering a run. King ultimately decided to run for re-election, which he won with 72% of the vote.

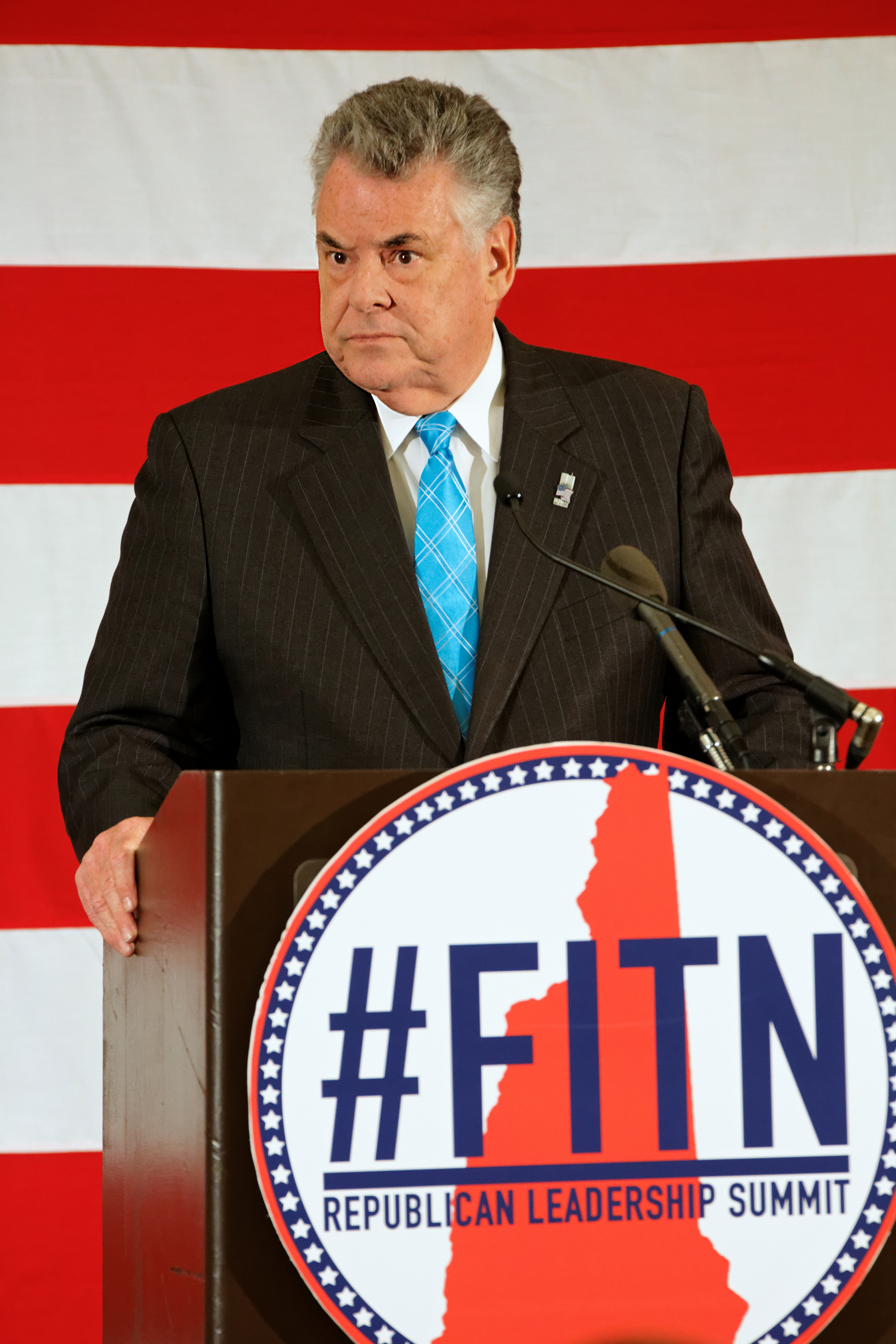
King at 2015 FITN (First in the Nation) Republican Leadership Summit in New Hampshire

During a 2013 radio interview in New Hampshire, King said that he was in the state "because right now I'm running for president," for the 2016 election. However, during a March 2014 CNN interview, King said he was considering running, not actively running. In a July 2015 interview with Wolf Blitzer on CNN, King announced he would not be running for president. King had earlier characterized a potential candidacy as being opposed to potential Tea Party movement candidates such as Rand Paul and Ted Cruz, whom he criticized for their national defense policies. He later opposed Republican efforts to tie the repeal of delay of the Affordable Care Act to a continuing resolution before and during the 2013 government shutdown.

== Political positions and statements ==
King was ranked as the most bipartisan member of the US House of Representatives during the 114th United States Congress in the Bipartisan Index created by The Lugar Center and the McCourt School of Public Policy that ranks members of the US Congress by the frequency by which each member's bills attract co-sponsors from the opposite party and each member's co-sponsorship of bills by members of the opposite party. He was a member of the Republican Main Street Partnership. In 2010, when Charles Rangel of New York was censured for ethical violations, King, along with Alaska Representative Don Young, were the only two Republicans voting against.

Although he supported John McCain for president in 2000, and despite his earlier disagreements with George W. Bush, King later became a Bush supporter. He opposed McCain's calls for an end to coercive interrogation methods used with suspected terrorists, as well as the senator's 2007 effort to enact a path to citizenship for current undocumented immigrants.

On April 19, 2016, King stated that he would "take cyanide" should Ted Cruz ever win the Republican nomination for president, stating:

I hate Ted Cruz, and I think I'll take cyanide if he ever got the nomination. Now, having said that, I think you're going to see Donald Trump scoring a big victory tonight. I have not endorsed Donald Trump. In fact, I actually voted by absentee ballot for John Kasich.

The animosity stemmed from the Texas senator not supporting a 9/11-related healthcare bill for police and firefighters, and a statement from Cruz that New York values are socially liberal.

King, like all 195 Republican members of the House present, voted against both articles of impeachment against Donald Trump during Trump's first impeachment in 2019.

=== Economy ===
King voted for the 2008 Wall Street bailout, saying it was "necessary for the financial health of New York and his district." He opposed the 2009 economic stimulus package.

King was one of five New York Republicans in the House to vote against the Tax Cuts and Jobs Act of 2017. He voted against it due to the $10,000 cap the bill would impose on the deductibility of state, local, and property taxes and the impact that would have in New York, a high-tax state. Upon the possibility of a second round of cuts, King reiterated he would be "forced to oppose" more tax cuts if legislation included a provision "permanently extending the $10,000 cap on the state and local tax (SALT) deduction". Only twelve Republican members of Congress in total voted against the bill.

=== Labor issues ===
King was considered a pro-union Republican. At times, King was highly critical of his party's leadership for being, in his view, "anti-union." During his time in Congress, King's voting record was significantly more pro-labor than most members of his party. In 2019, the AFL-CIO gave King a score of 55%; compared to a House Republican average of 31% for that same year. King holds a lifetime score of 54%. 2019 marked the first time since 2010 (when King scored the GOP average of 7%) that King's score was not at least double the Republican average.

=== Guns ===
King is pro-gun control. He cites his support of gun control based on his experiences in New York, "Virtually every time there's a murder in New York, the gun tracked comes from another state," he states, expressing that without stricter gun control, people in New York will get killed.

King authored legislation to close what is known as the "terror gap," which would ban individuals on the terrorist watch list from purchasing guns. He also supports the banning of bump stocks, in the wake of the 2017 Las Vegas shooting. He describes the banning of bump stocks as being "morally, legally, and common sense-wise the right thing to do."

King supports expanding background checks for commercial gun sales (including at gun shows), and co-sponsored a bipartisan bill on this issue with Mike Thompson in 2013.

The NRA Political Victory Fund gave King a rating of D in 2014, falling to an "F" in 2016.

=== Health care ===
On May 4, 2017, King voted in favor of repealing the Affordable Care Act and replacing it with the American Health Care Act.

=== House Intelligence Committee ===
King was a member of the House Permanent Select Committee on Intelligence. In 2018, he voted to release the Nunes memo, written by committee staff at the request of Republican committee chairman US Representative Devin Nunes, over the objections of senior FBI leaders and all Democratic members of the committee. The memo states that the FBI "may have relied on politically motivated or questionable sources" to obtain a Foreign Intelligence Surveillance Act (FISA) warrant on Trump adviser Carter Page in October 2016, and in three subsequent renewals, during the early phases of the FBI's investigation into possible Russian interference in the 2016 United States elections.

At the time Trump asserted that the memo discredited the investigation into Russian interference in the 2016 United States elections. The FBI was asserted that "material omissions of fact ... fundamentally impact the memo's accuracy."

=== Irish republicanism and the IRA ===
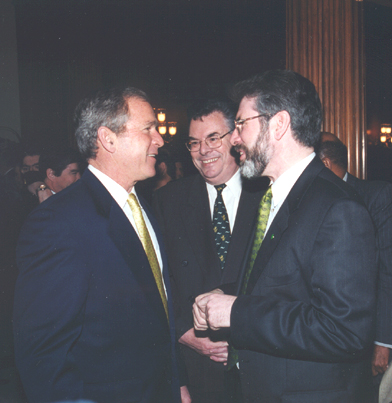
King with President George W. Bush and Gerry Adams in 2001

King began actively supporting the Irish republican movement in the late 1970s. He frequently traveled to Northern Ireland to meet with senior members of the paramilitary group, the Provisional Irish Republican Army (IRA), many of whom he counted as friends. King compared Gerry Adams, the leader of Sinn Féin, the political wing of the Irish republican movement, to George Washington, and said that the "British government is a murder machine". King met Adams in person in 1984.

King became involved with Irish Northern Aid (NORAID), an organization that the British, Irish, and US governments had accused of financing IRA activities and providing them with weapons. Regarding the IRA's violent campaign against British rule in Northern Ireland, King said, "If civilians are killed in an attack on a military installation, it is certainly regrettable, but I will not morally blame the IRA for it."

King called the IRA "the legitimate voice of occupied Ireland". Speaking at a pro-IRA rally in 1982 in Nassau County, New York, King pledged support to "those brave men and women who this very moment are carrying forth the struggle against British imperialism in the streets of Belfast and Derry." In 1985, the Irish government boycotted New York's annual St. Patrick's Day celebrations in protest over King serving as Grand Marshal of the event; the Irish government condemned him as an "avowed" supporter of "IRA terrorism". At the parade he again offered words of support for the IRA.

During the murder trial of an IRA member in the 1980s, a judge in Northern Ireland ejected King from the courtroom, describing King as "an obvious collaborator with the IRA".

In 1993, King lobbied unsuccessfully for Gerry Adams to be a guest at the presidential inauguration of Bill Clinton. King was a go-between during the Northern Ireland peace process, and has said the IRA was a "legitimate force that had to be recognized" to have peace.

In 2002, King denounced congressional investigation of the IRA-FARC links in the Colombia Three case.

Although disgruntled by Sinn Féin's opposition to the 2003 United States invasion of Iraq, King supported bail in 2008 for an IRA Maze escapee, Pól Brennan. Brennan was facing charges for illegally entering the US and was deported to the Republic of Ireland in April 2009.

In a 2005 interview, King said he had "cooled on Ireland", blaming an epidemic of what he called "knee-jerk anti-Americanism" that swept through Ireland after the invasions of Afghanistan and Iraq. "I don't buy that it's just anti-Bush. There's a certain unpleasant trait that the Irish have, and it's begrudgery ... and resentment towards the Americans." King said he had turned down an offer from the Obama administration to be the US ambassador to Ireland in 2009. At a September 2011 hearing conducted by the UK Parliament's Home Affairs Select Committee as part of its "Roots of Violent Radicalisation" inquiry, King defended his 1985 "If civilians are killed" remarks and extolled his role in the peace process as an "honest mediator". His office cited Congressional Research Service and House of Commons researchers noting that King became the first member of Congress to testify before a UK parliamentary hearing.

In 2011, King said that his ties to the IRA had been "entirely distorted", arguing that if the accusations were true then "I doubt the president of the United States would have offered me the position of ambassador to Ireland."

=== Islam ===
King has faced criticism over concerns of his treatment and views towards the civil rights of minority communities, especially that of Muslim Americans. Some observers have credited King with demonizing Muslim Americans and giving political influence towards anti-Muslim views and activism.

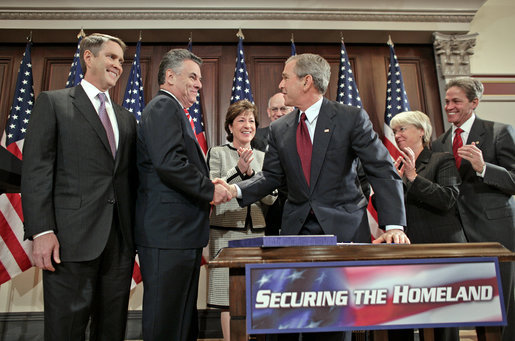
George W. Bush shakes hands with Peter King, chairman of the United States House Committee on Homeland Security, after signing H.R. 4954, the SAFE Port Act

During the 1990s, King enjoyed a close relationship with the Muslim community in his congressional district. King often gave speeches at the Islamic Center of Long Island in Westbury, NY, held book signings in the prayer hall, hired Muslim interns, and was one of the few Republicans who supported US intervention in the 1990s to help Muslims in Bosnia and Kosovo. The Muslim community thanked King for his work by making him the guest of honor for the 1993 opening of a $3 million prayer hall. For years, a picture of King cutting the ceremonial ribbon hung on the bulletin board by the mosque's entrance.

In a September 2007 interview with the website Politico.com, King said "There are too many mosques in this country ... There are too many people sympathetic to radical Islam. We should be looking at them more carefully and finding out how we can infiltrate them." King later said he meant to say that too many mosques in the United States do not cooperate with law enforcement.

In late 2016, King suggested to Donald Trump that a federal program be formed aimed at surveilling the activities of American Muslims.

=== National security ===
King supported the Iraq War. King supported President Barack Obama's order to kill Osama bin Laden, saying that he knew it was a "tough decision" to make in the situation room. He also approved of Obama's surprise trip to Afghanistan in May 2012.

The New York Times wrote in 2006 that King had been "the Patriot Act's most fervent fan." In 2008, King told the Times, "Look, we have not been attacked in seven years and it's not because of luck."

Since 2009, King has argued against holding terrorist trials in New York City, saying that enormous security risks and financial costs would accompany the public trials. In April 2011, he called for attorney general Eric Holder to resign due to Holder's plans to transfer Khalid Sheikh Mohammed and four other alleged co-conspirators in the September 11, 2001, attacks from Guantanamo to New York City for trials in US federal court. King denounced Holder's plan "as the most irresponsible decision ever made by any attorney general."

King continued to challenge Holder in April 2011, demanding to know why the Council on American-Islamic Relations (CAIR), its co-founder Omar Ahmad, the Islamic Society of North America, the North American Islamic Trust, and other unindicted "co-conspirators" in the Holy Land Foundation "terrorism financing" trial, were not being prosecuted by the United States Department of Justice. In a letter to Holder, King wrote he had recently learned that the decision had been made by high-ranking Justice Department officials "over the vehement and stated objections of special agents and supervisors of the Federal Bureau of Investigation, as well as the prosecutors at the U.S. attorney's office in Dallas", adding that "there should be full transparency into the Department's decision." Holder responded that the decision not to prosecute had been made during the Bush administration. The US attorney in Dallas said he alone had been responsible for the decision, which had been made based on an analysis of the law and the evidence, with no political pressure involved.

In December 2009, King commented on reports that accused attempted airline bomber, Umar Farouk Abdulmutallab, had admitted to being trained and equipped in Yemen and on then pending plans to release several Guantanamo prisoners to Yemen: "I don't think Guantanamo should be closed, but if we're going to close it I don't believe we should be sending people to Yemen where prisoners have managed to escape in the past . ... Obviously, if [Abdulmutallab] did get training and direction from Yemen, it just adds to what is already a dangerous situation", he said.

King criticized the activities of WikiLeaks and in December 2010 suggested that the group be designated a "terrorist organization" and treated as such by US agencies. In 2011, King became a co-sponsor of the Stop Online Piracy Act (SOPA). He praised Obama's nominations of Leon Panetta for United States Secretary of Defense and David Petraeus for director of the Central Intelligence Agency, saying, "Director Panetta has done an outstanding job at the CIA, and General Petraeus has distinguished himself as one of the great American military leaders. Both men ... will be instrumental as we continue to combat the terrorist threat." On June 11, 2013, King stated that Edward Snowden should be punished for releasing classified information to the American public, and added that journalists Glenn Greenwald and Laura Poitras should also be punished for publishing classified documents provided by Snowden. On June 12, 2013, on Fox News, King called for prosecution of Greenwald, alleging that the journalist was said to be in possession of names of CIA agents around the world and would be "threatening to disclose" them. Via Twitter, Greenwald immediately refuted King's claim and called it a "blatant lie".

King suggested in 2014 that "foreign policy was not a major issue" for Obama, as he had worn a light tan suit in August in Washington the day before. He also said that "There's no way any of us can excuse what the president did yesterday" in reference to wearing the light tan suit as he addressed the media.

King and Rep. Bill Pascrell (D-NJ) asked Congress on March 11, 2015, to make anthrax vaccines that are about to expire and otherwise would be disposed of available to emergency responders. They made their request in a letter to fellow members of Congress shortly after King introduced the bill (H.R. 1300) on March 4, 2015. King previously introduced the bill in September 2014, but it was not enacted.

King supported Trump's 2017 executive order to temporarily curtail immigration to the United States from some Muslim-majority countries until better screening methods are devised. He stated that "I don't think the Constitution applies to people coming in from outside the country, especially if there is a logical basis for it."

=== Radicalization hearings ===
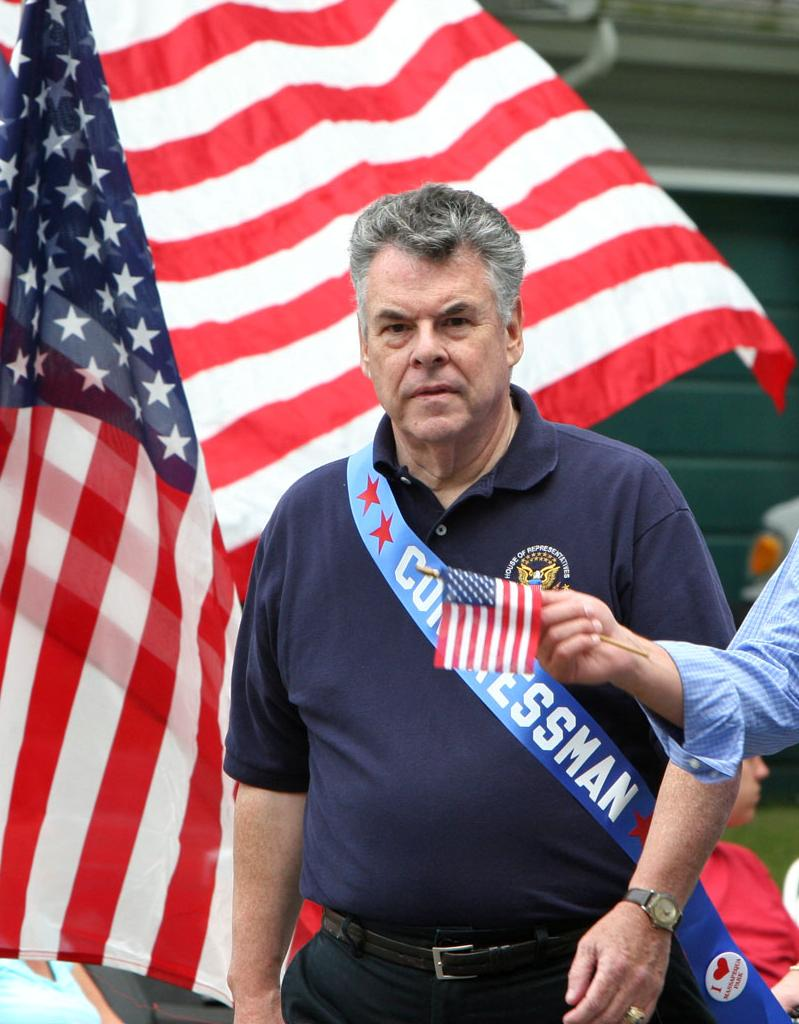
King in 2007

In December 2010, King announced that, when he became chairman of the House Homeland Security Committee, he would hold hearings on the alleged radicalization of some American Muslims. While allowing that, "The overwhelming majority of Muslims are outstanding citizens," he claimed some Islamic clerics were telling their congregations to ignore extremism and to refrain from helping government investigators. King cited Justice Department statistics showing that, over the previous two years, 50 US citizens had been charged with major acts of terrorism and that all were motivated by radical Islamic ideologies.

The first hearing, held on March 10, 2011, was entitled "The Extent of Radicalization in the American Muslim Community and that Community's Response." The hearing included testimony from congressmen John D. Dingell of Michigan, Keith Ellison of Minnesota, who was one of two Muslims in the US Congress at the time, Frank Wolf (R-VA), and Los Angeles county sheriff Leroy Baca.

Others to provide testimony included Dr. M Zuhdi Jasser, a secular Muslim and founder of the American Islamic Forum for Democracy; Melvin Bledsoe, whose son Abdulhakim Mujahid Muhammad, a Muslim convert, is serving a life sentence for killing a soldier and wounding another in the 2009 Little Rock recruiting office shooting; and Abdirizak Bihi, the Director of the Somali Education and Social Advocacy Center. The Council on American Islamic Relations submitted a statement to the committee.

In an article for the National Review, King announced that his second and third Homeland Security Committee hearings on radicalization would focus on foreign money coming into American mosques and al Shabab's efforts to recruit young Muslim men in Minneapolis, Minnesota. The second hearing was set for mid-May while the third was tentatively scheduled for July. King stated he would continue to hold radicalization hearings as long as he is chairman of the House Homeland Security Committee.

==== Reactions ====
Bennie Thompson (D-MS), the ranking Democrat on the Homeland Security Committee, responded by saying that "none of these law enforcement and intelligence officials have backed King's assertions that the Muslim community has not been helpful in thwarting terrorist attacks." Thompson wrote King, demanding that the scope of the hearings be widened to include all extremist groups in the United States, irrespective of ideology or religion.

Los Angeles County sheriff Lee Baca said there was nothing to support King's claims of non-cooperation by American Muslims, and invited King to Los Angeles to show the reported cooperation between Muslim-Americans and federal law enforcement. The Muslim Public Affairs Council (MPAC), in a letter to King, claimed that his call was sweeping and misguided and called for a meeting with him to discuss his initiatives, the proposed hearings, and the efforts of the Muslim American community to fight radicalization.

The Council on American Islamic Relations joined fifty other activist and Human Rights organizations, including Amnesty International, the Sikh Coalition, the Japanese American Citizens League and Unitarian Universalist Service Committee in signing a letter to Speaker of the House John Boehner (R-OH) and Minority Leader Nancy Pelosi (D-CA), comparing the hearings to those held by Senator Joe McCarthy in the 1950s and calling them "divisive and wrong", and "an affront to fundamental [American] freedoms"

Seema Jilani, a freelance journalist writing an opinion piece in The Guardian, described King as "America's new McCarthy", who was instigating "a bigoted witchhunt."

Jay Sekulow, chief counsel for the conservative religious organization American Center for Law and Justice (ACLJ), which opposed the building of the Park51 Community Center, declared his support for King and the hearings and remarked, "This hearing isn't about profiling — it's about protecting our homeland."

Frank Gaffney, founder and president of the American Center for Security Policy, praised King for holding a hearing "about an issue that has long been deemed politically untouchable" and opined that King had indeed shown there is "a problem of 'extremism' within the American Muslim community." Several members of Congress, including Representatives Mike Rogers and Joe Walsh, wrote letters of support for King's hearings. Rogers wrote that radicalization could happen anywhere in the United States, and thus it is an issue all Americans have to deal with. Walsh added that "Homegrown terrorists are the number one threat facing American families right now, and it would be irresponsible and negligent not to try and identify the causes of their radicalization."

=== Social issues ===
==== LGBT rights ====
In the 114th Congress, King had a score of 4 out of 100 from the Human Rights Campaign for his voting record on LGBT rights issues. He does not support same-sex marriage and opposed the Supreme Court taking on the landmark Obergefell v. Hodges case.

==== Abortion ====
King identifies as "pro-life." While in Congress, King consistently received a score of 0%, from NARAL-Pro Choice America, an abortion rights organization. When asked at the Republican National Convention in 2012, King said, "[The] main purpose of government is to protect innocent life, no matter where that life is." In the same interview, King said a woman should not be punished for getting an abortion but doctors who perform the procedure should be.

==== Marijuana ====
King had a "C" rating from NORML regarding his voting record on cannabis-related matters. He has twice voted against providing veterans access to medical marijuana via the Veterans Health Administration.

=== Criticism of Occupy Wall Street ===
King was harshly critical of the Occupy Wall Street movement from the beginning; commenting on October 7, 2011:

We have to be careful not to allow this to get any legitimacy. I'm taking this seriously in that I'm old enough to remember what happened in the 1960s when the left-wing took to the streets and somehow the media glorified them and it ended up shaping policy. We can't allow that to happen.

King supported New York City mayor Bloomberg's decision to have the NYPD forcibly evict the Occupy protestors from Manhattan's Zuccotti Park; calling them, "low life dirtbags" and "losers", who "live in dirt." Bloomberg received widespread bipartisan support for the removal.

=== Noteworthy statements ===
On July 5, 2009, shortly after the death of Michael Jackson, King made a video statement chiding the media for its coverage of Jackson's death:

Let's knock out the psychobabble. He was a pervert, a child molester, he was a pedophile. And to be giving this much coverage to him, day in and day out, what does it say about us as a country? I just think we're too politically correct. No one wants to stand up and say we don't need Michael Jackson. He died, he had some talent, fine. There's men and women dying every day in Afghanistan. Let's give them the credit they deserve.

King's statement generated national media coverage. In reaction to the controversy, King said, "I believe I'm articulating the views of a great majority of the American people".

Responding to the 2014 killing of Eric Garner by police, King said, "If he had not had asthma, and a heart condition, and was so obese, almost definitely he would not have died from this."

In the wake of the 2016 Orlando nightclub shooting, King posted on Facebook that it was a "vicious Islamic terrorist attack" and said the "Islamic threat to the United States is greater than at any time since 9/11." He proceeded to then critique "leftwing editors at the New York Times and the liberal ideologies" of the American Civil Liberties Union, saying both the newspaper and the organization were attempting to "intimidate" critics of radical Islam.

On May 26, 2018, responding to the owner of the New York Jets supporting the right of National Football League players to kneel in protest during the national anthem, King likened the protest to that of "Nazi salutes".

== Committee assignments ==
King's committee assignments for the 116th United States Congress:

- Committee on Homeland Security
  - Subcommittee on Counterterrorism and Intelligence (Ranking Member)
  - Subcommittee on Emergency Preparedness, Response, and Communications

King was a member of the House Baltic Caucus, the Congressional NextGen 9-1-1 Caucus and the Climate Solutions Caucus.

== Electoral history (US House of Representatives) ==
Third party candidates omitted, so percentages may not add up to 100%.

| Year | Candidate | Votes | % |
|---|---|---|---|
| 1992 | Peter T. King (R) | 124,727 | 50% |
| 1992 | Steve Orlins (D) | 116,915 | 46% |
| 1994 | Peter T. King (R) | 115,236 | 59% |
| 1994 | Norma Grill (D) | 77,774 | 40% |
| 1996 | Peter T. King (R) | 127,972 | 55% |
| 1996 | Dal LaMagna (D) | 97,518 | 42% |
| 1998 | Peter T. King (R) | 117,258 | 64% |
| 1998 | Kevin Langberg (D) | 63,628 | 35% |
| 2000 | Peter T. King (R) | 143,126 | 60% |
| 2000 | Dal LaMagna (D) | 95,787 | 40% |
| 2002 | Peter T. King (R) | 121,537 | 72% |
| 2002 | Stuart Finz (D) | 46,022 | 27% |
| 2004 | Peter T. King (R) | 171,259 | 63% |
| 2004 | Blair Mathies (D) | 100,737 | 37% |
| 2006 | Peter T. King (R) | 101,787 | 56% |
| 2006 | David Mejias (D) | 79,843 | 44% |
| 2008 | Peter T. King (R) | 135,648 | 64% |
| 2008 | Graham Long (D) | 76,918 | 35% |
| 2010 | Peter T. King (R) | 126,142 | 72% |
| 2010 | Howard Kudler (D) | 48,963 | 28% |
| 2012 | Peter T. King (R) | 142,309 | 59% |
| 2012 | Vivianne Falcone (D) | 100,545 | 41% |
| 2014 | Peter T. King (R) | 91,701 | 65% |
| 2014 | Patricia Maher (D) | 40,009 | 28% |
| 2016 | Peter T. King (R) | 181,506 | 62% |
| 2016 | Du Wayne Gregory (D) | 110,938 | 38% |
| 2018 | Peter T. King (R) | 128,078 | 53% |
| 2018 | Liuba Grechen Shirley (D) | 113,074 | 47% |

== Books ==
King has authored three novels, Terrible Beauty (1999), Deliver Us From Evil (2002), and Vale of Tears (2003).

== See also ==
- 9/11 Commission
- United States Department of Homeland Security

Party political offices
| Preceded by Frances Sciafani | Republican nominee for Attorney General of New York; 1986 | Succeeded by Bernard Smith |
U.S. House of Representatives
| Preceded by Bob Mrazek | Member of the US House of Representatives from New York's 3rd congressional district 1993–2013 | Succeeded by Steve Israel |
| Preceded by Steve Israel | Member of the US House of Representatives from New York's 2nd congressional district 2013–2021 | Succeeded by Andrew Garbarino |
| Preceded by Christopher Cox | Chair of the House Homeland Security Committee; 2005–2007 | Succeeded by Bennie Thompson |
| Preceded by Bennie Thompson | Chair of the House Homeland Security Committee; 2011–2013 | Succeeded by Michael McCaul |
U.S. order of precedence (ceremonial)
| Preceded by Rick Boucher as former US Representative | Order of precedence of the United States as former US Representative | Succeeded by Solomon P. Ortiz as former US Representative |
