= 1990 New York Attorney General election =

1990 New York Attorney General Election
- November 6, 1990
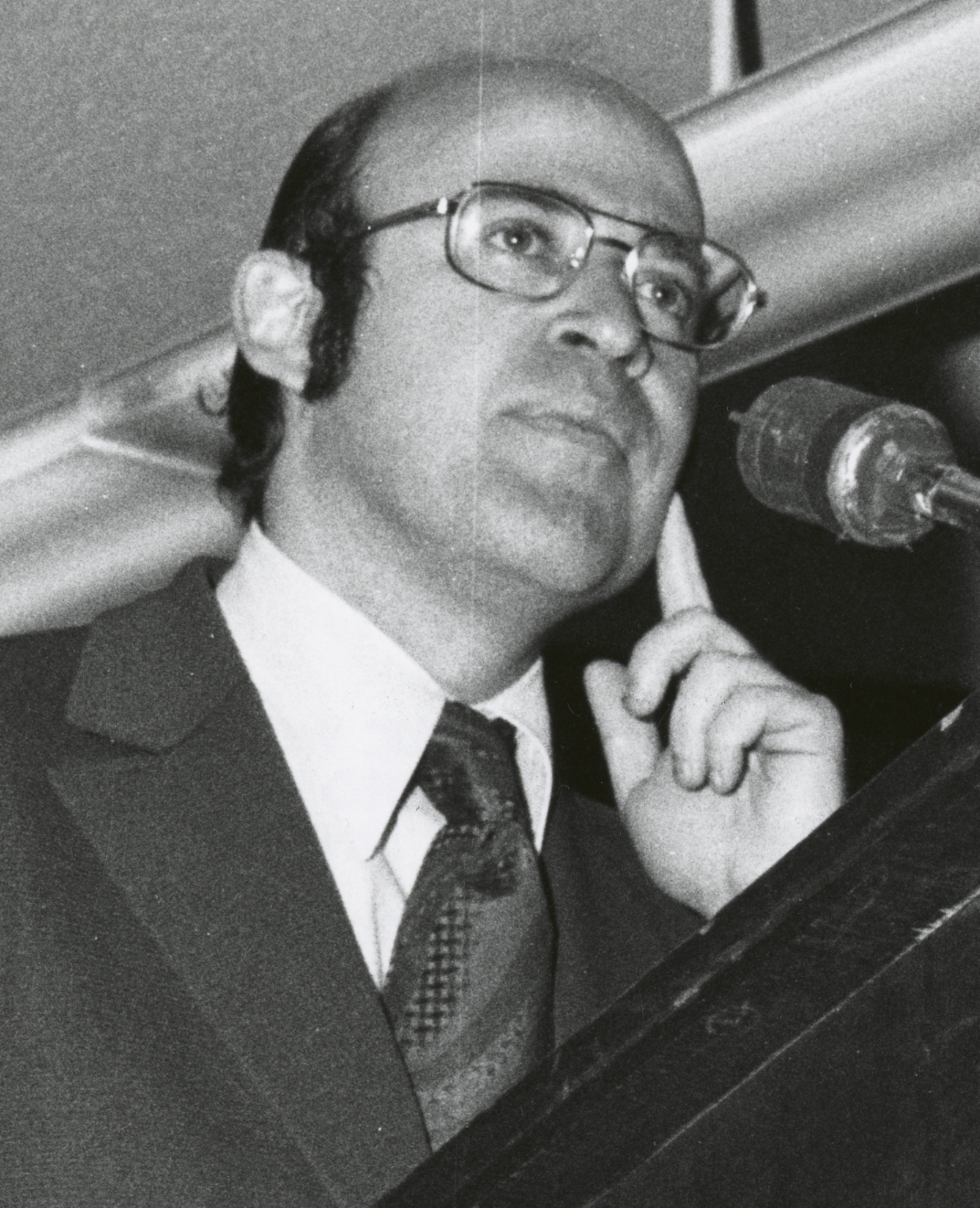

Nominee	Robert Abrams	Bernard C. Smith
Party	Democratic	Republican
Alliance	Liberal	Conservative
Popular vote	2,404,791	1,229,318
Percentage	62.73%	32.07%
- County results Abrams: 40–50% 50–60% 60–70% 70–80% 80–90% Smith: 40–50% 50–60%
New York Attorney General before election
Robert Abrams
Democratic
Elected New York Attorney General
Robert Abrams
Democratic

The 1990 New York State Attorney General election took place on November 6, 1990, to elect a candidate to the position of Attorney General. Democratic nominee and incumbent Attorney General Robert Abrams defeated Republican nominee Bernard C. Smith, resulting in the re-election of Abrams to the position of Attorney General.

== General election ==
=== Candidates ===
- Robert Abrams, incumbent Attorney General (Democratic)
- Bernard C. Smith, former State Senator from Northport (Republican)
- Robert F. Nolan (Right to Life)
- Margaret Fries (Libertarian)
- Fred Newman (New Alliance)
- Natalie Harris (Socialist Workers)

=== Results ===
1990 New York State Attorney General Election
Party	Candidate	Votes	%
Democratic	Robert Abrams	2,312,033	60.31%
Liberal	Robert Abrams	92,758	2.4%
Total	Robert Abrams (Incumbent)	2,404,791	62.73%
Republican	Bernard Smith	945,074	24.65%
Conservative	Bernard Smith	284,244	7.42%
Total	Bernard C. Smith	1,229,318	32.07%
Right to Life	Robert Nolan	136,880	3.57%
Libertarian	Margaret Fries	22,602	0.59%
New Alliance	Fred Newman	22,437	0.59%
Socialist Workers	Natalie Harris	17,272	0.45%
Total votes		3,833,300	100%
