= United States House resolution on persecution of the Rohingya people in Burma =

- Long title: Urging the Government of Burma to end the persecution of the Rohingya people and respect internationally recognized human rights for all ethnic and religious minority groups within Burma.
- Announced in: the 113th United States Congress
- Sponsored by: Rep. James P. McGovern (D, MA-2)
- Number of co-sponsors: 50

Codification
- Agencies affected: United States House of Representatives

Legislative history
- Introduced in the House as H.Res. 418 by Rep. James P. McGovern (D, MA-2) on November 18, 2013; Committee consideration by United States House Committee on Foreign Affairs, United States House Foreign Affairs Subcommittee on Africa, Global Health, Global Human Rights and International Organizations, United States House Foreign Affairs Subcommittee on Asia and the Pacific; Passed the House on May 7, 2014 (voice vote)

H.Res. 418 is a simple resolution that calls on the government of Burma to end the persecution, discrimination, and genocide against the Rohingya people within its borders and calls on the United States government and the international community to pressure the Burmese to do so. The resolution is in response to allegations of Burmese Buddhist attacks on Rohingya Muslims that may have occurred earlier in 2014.

The resolution was introduced and passed by the United States House of Representatives during the 113th United States Congress. As a simple resolution, H.Res. 418 does not require approval from the United States Senate or the signature of the President of the United States because it only expresses the opinion or gives the advice of the House and has no actual legal power.

== Background ==
Burma, officially the Republic of the Union of Myanmar, commonly shortened to Myanmar, is a sovereign state in Southeast Asia bordered by Bangladesh, India, China, Laos and Thailand. One third of Burma's total perimeter of 1,930 kilometres (1,200 miles) forms an uninterrupted coastline along the Bay of Bengal and the Andaman Sea. Burma's population of over 60 million makes it the world's 24th most populous country and, at 676,578 square kilometres (261,227 sq mi), it is the world's 40th largest country and the second largest in Southeast Asia.

The British conquered Burma after three Anglo-Burmese Wars in the 19th century and the country became a British colony (a part of India until 1937 and then a separately administered colony). Burma became an independent nation in 1948, initially as a democratic nation and then, following a coup in 1962, a military dictatorship which formally ended in 2011. For most of its independent years, the country has been engrossed in rampant ethnic strife and a myriad of Burma's ethnic groups have been involved in one of the world's longest-running unresolved civil wars. During this time, the United Nations and several other organizations have reported consistent and systematic human rights violations in the country. In 2011, the military junta was officially dissolved following a 2010 general election, and a nominally civilian government was installed. Although the military retains enormous influence through the constitution that was ratified in 2008, it has taken steps toward relinquishing control of the government. This, along with the release of Burma's most prominent human rights activist, Aung San Suu Kyi, and many other political prisoners, has improved the country's human rights record and foreign relations and has led to the easing of trade and other economic sanctions that had been imposed by the European Union and the United States. There is, however, continuing criticism of the government's treatment of the largely Muslim ethnic Rohingya minority and its poor response to the religious clashes that have occurred throughout the nation, described by various human rights organizations as a policy of ethnic cleansing.

== Provisions of the resolution ==
This summary is based largely on the summary provided by the Congressional Research Service, a public domain source.

The resolution would call on: (1) Burma to end the persecution and discrimination of the Rohingya people and ensure respect for internationally recognized human rights for all ethnic and religious minority groups, and (2) the United States and the international community to put consistent pressure on Burma to end such persecution and discrimination.

== Procedural history ==
H.Res. 418 was introduced into the United States House of Representatives on November 18, 2013 by Rep. James P. McGovern (D, MA-2). The resolution was referred to the United States House Committee on Foreign Affairs, the United States House Foreign Affairs Subcommittee on Africa, Global Health, Global Human Rights and International Organizations, and the United States House Foreign Affairs Subcommittee on Asia and the Pacific. The resolution was scheduled to be voted on under suspension of the rules on May 7, 2014. On May 7, 2014, the House voted in a voice vote to pass the resolution.

== Debate and discussion ==
The resolution's sponsor, Rep. McGovern, argued that "the Burmese government needs to recognize the Rohingya as an ethnic group. The situation is dire and rapidly deteriorating." Rep. Ed Royce (R-CA) agreed, saying "let's all send a message that the current state of human rights in Burma is unacceptable."

The Council on American-Islamic Relations supported the bill, describing the resolution as being "in response to the ongoing campaign of violence and attempted ethnic cleansing by Burmese national extremists of the minority Rohingya Muslim community. This campaign of violence has taken the lives of more than 1,000 Rohingya and other Muslims and left more than 140,000 displaced, living in makeshift camps both in Burma and in neighboring states."

== See also ==
- List of bills in the 113th United States Congress
- Persecution of Muslims in Burma
