= Robert Abrams =

American lawyer and politician

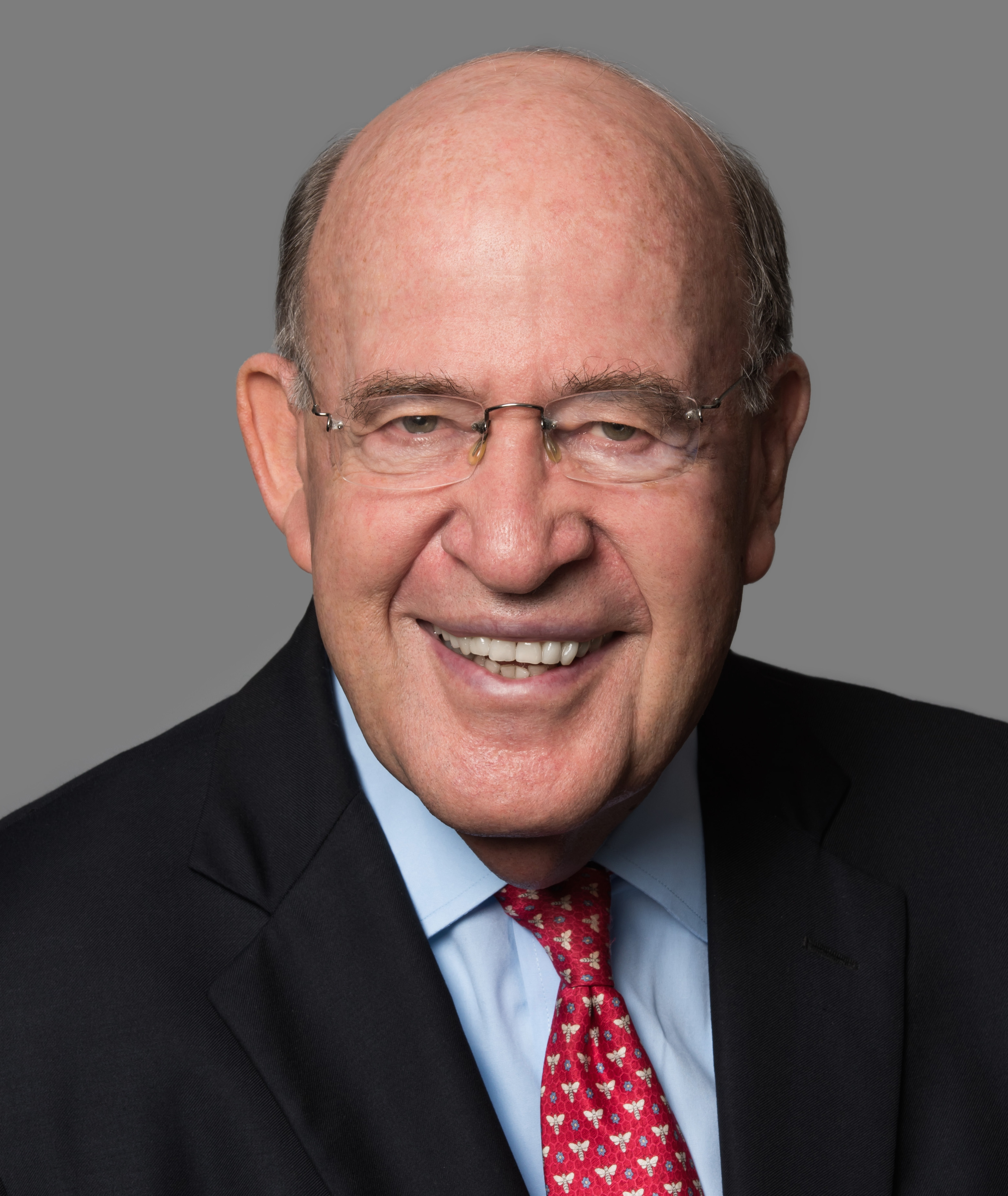
- Abrams in 2014

60th Attorney General of New York
- In office January 1, 1979 – December 31, 1993
- Governor: Hugh Carey; Mario Cuomo
- Preceded by: Louis Lefkowitz
- Succeeded by: Oliver Koppell

9th Borough President of The Bronx
- In office January 1, 1970 – December 31, 1978
- Preceded by: Herman Badillo
- Succeeded by: Stanley Simon

Member of the New York State Assembly
- In office January 1, 1966 – December 31, 1969
- Preceded by: John T. Satriale
- Succeeded by: Alan Hochberg
- Constituency: 89th district (1966); 81st district (1967–1969)

Personal details
- Born: July 4, 1938 (age 88) Bronx, New York, U.S.
- Party: Democratic
- Spouse: Diane Schulder Abrams
- Children: 2
- Education: Columbia College; New York University
- Occupation: Lawyer
- Website: Website

Robert Abrams (born July 4, 1938) is an American attorney and politician. He served as the attorney general of New York from 1979 to 1993 and was the Democratic nominee for the 1992 United States Senate election in New York.

== Early life and education ==
Abrams was born in the Bronx, New York, in a Jewish family, the son of Benjamin and Dorothy Abrams. He has one sister, Marlene (Abrams) Kitrosser. He graduated from Christopher Columbus High School, Columbia College, and the New York University School of Law.

== Career ==
=== New York State Assembly ===
Abrams launched his political career as a 27-year-old insurgent challenging his local assemblyman and the Bronx Democratic machine in a Democratic primary in September 1965. Abrams was a member of the New York State Assembly from 1966 to 1969, sitting in the 176th, 177th and 178th New York State Legislatures.

=== Bronx Borough President ===
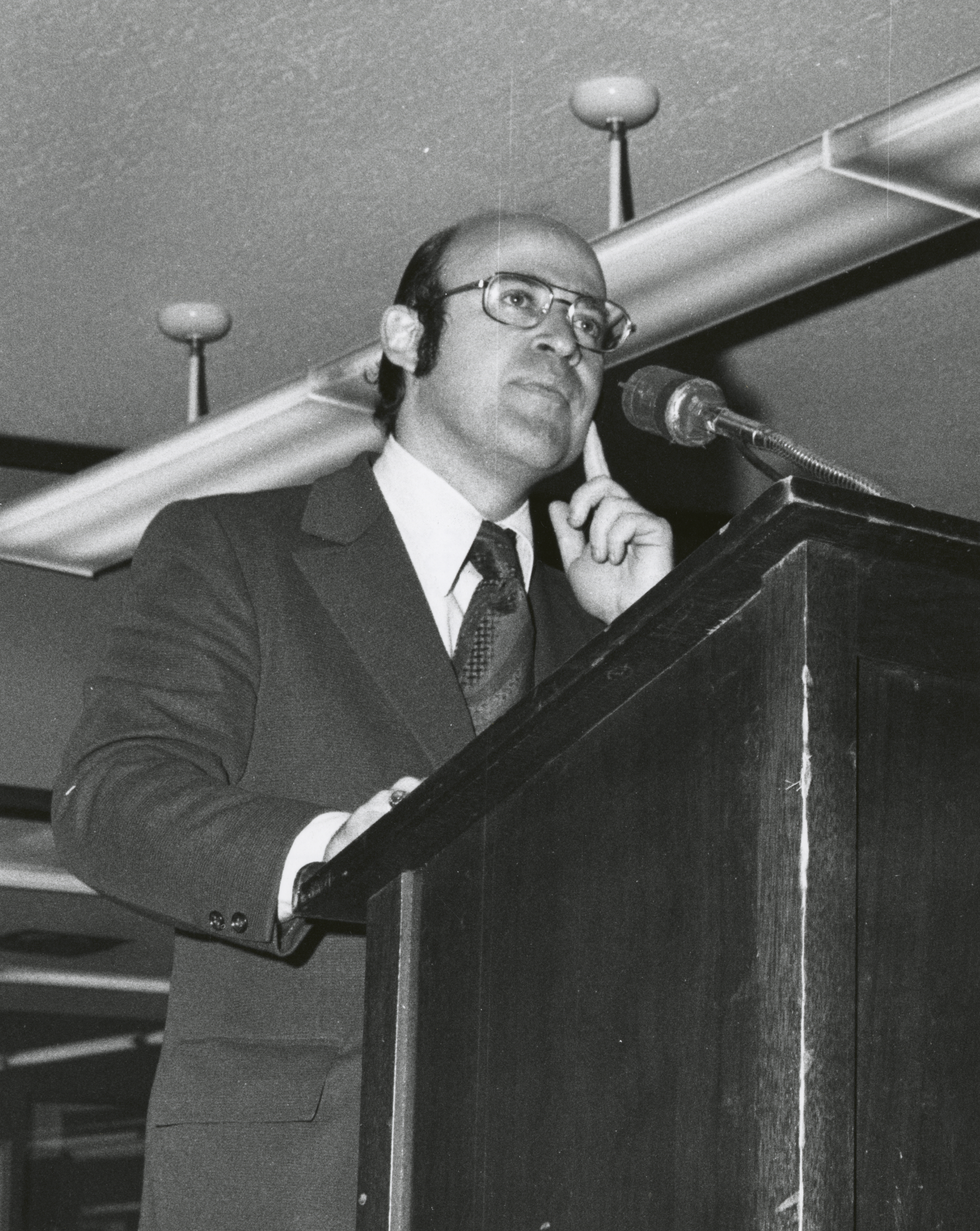
Robert Abrams as Bronx Borough President in 1973

From 1970 to 1978, he was borough president of the Bronx and a member of the New York City Board of Estimate, having been elected in 1969 and overwhelmingly re-elected in 1973 and 1977.

He was a delegate to the 1972, 1976, 1980 and 1984 Democratic National Conventions. At the 1972 Democratic National Convention, he was the co-chair of the New York delegation and was at the microphone to cast New York's 267 votes for George McGovern. In 1980, he was the chairman of Senator Edward M. Kennedy's primary campaign for president in New York and led a strong victory over incumbent President Jimmy Carter. In 1988, he was a presidential elector, voting for Michael Dukakis–Lloyd Bentsen ticket.

=== New York Attorney General ===
Abrams was elected New York Attorney General in 1978, the first time in forty years a Democrat was elected to that post, and was subsequently re-elected three times, in 1982, 1986 and 1990. He defeated future Republican Rep Peter King in his 1986 re-election campaign for Attorney General. Abrams built a reputation as an activist and consumer advocate, taking on environmental polluters, charity frauds, discrimination in housing and various activities in the marketplace. He is also well-known for the manner in which he sensitively and professionally handled an extremely difficult assignment, that of Special Prosecutor investigating the claims of Tawana Brawley. Governor Mario Cuomo directed him in 1988 to investigate the claims of Brawley, a black teenager, that she had been abducted and raped in upstate Dutchess County by a gang of whites. A lengthy grand jury inquiry supervised by Abrams' office later concluded that she had fabricated her story.

During his tenure as attorney general, Abrams received numerous awards and honors and earned national prominence rarely achieved by a state-level official. He was elected president of the National Association of Attorneys General after serving as chairman of its Environment, Civil Rights and Anti-Trust Committees and was selected by his colleagues to receive the coveted Wyman Award as Outstanding Attorney General in the Nation. He was awarded honorary Doctor of Law degrees from Yeshiva University, Hofstra University, Long Island University and Pace University.

=== 1992 U.S. Senate election ===
In 1992, he sought election to the United States Senate, to challenge Republican Senator Al D'Amato. He won the Democratic Primary, defeating former Congresswoman Geraldine Ferraro, Rev. Al Sharpton, and New York City Comptroller Elizabeth Holtzman. Abrams was initially the front-runner but by the end of the summer he was running second to Ferraro in polls. The nomination battle then took a bitter turn, particularly Holtzman and Abrams' attack on Ferraro's questionable business dealings including links with organized crime members including Gambino crime family soldier Robert DiBernardo, which Ferraro interpreted as anti-Italian slurs. After Abrams emerged as the nominee, the Democrats remained divided and he was unable to secure Ferraro's endorsement until the last days of the campaign. Abrams was also criticized for calling D'Amato a Fascist, and he narrowly lost the general election as a result of these controversies.

After narrowly losing the Senate race, despite making plans to run for re-election as state attorney general, Abrams announced his resignation from the office of attorney general on September 8, 1993, to take effect on December 31. He had a year left in his term.

=== Later career ===
Upon leaving government, Abrams joined the now-defunct Stroock & Stroock & Lavan as a partner. He has remained active in civic affairs in New York. In 1996, the New York University School of Law established an annual lecture program, the Attorney General Robert Abrams Public Service Lecture whereby each year a prominent public figure who has performed exemplary public service addresses the students, faculty and alumni of the law school to urge students to consider all or a portion of their career to be dedicated to public service. During the ensuing 25 years, United States senators, governors, attorneys general and judges have appeared as guests, including United States Senators Joe Lieberman from Connecticut, Heidi Heitkamp from North Dakota, Tom Udall from New Mexico, Vermont Chief Justice Jeffrey Amestoy, Governors Jim Doyle of Wisconsin, Mike Easley of North Carolina, Ted Kulongoski of Oregon, and attorneys general Karl Racine of Washington, D.C., Josh Shapiro of Pennsylvania, and Letitia James of New York.

New York City Mayor Michael Bloomberg appointed Abrams in 2005 to serve on the New York City Charter Revision Commission. In 2006, New York Governor-Elect Eliot Spitzer appointed Abrams to serve as co-chair of his Policy Advisory Committee on Governmental Reform for his Transition, and New York Attorney General-Elect Andrew Cuomo appointed him Executive Chair of his Transition Committee. In 2008, New York Governor David Paterson appointed Abrams to serve on the Board of the United Nations Development Corporation. On May 9, 2009, New York Governor David Paterson renamed the Justice Building at the Empire State Plaza in Albany the Robert Abrams Building for Law and Justice. Also in 2009, Attorney General elect Eric Schneiderman appointed Abrams to serve as Honorary Co-chair of his Transition Committee. In 2010, New York's chief judge, Jonathan Lippman, appointed him to be a member of the Advisory Council for the Retired Attorney Pro Bono Program.

In 2012, Governor Andrew Cuomo appointed Abrams as co-chairman of a Moreland Commission to investigate the preparedness and response of the utilities in New York State to Superstorm Sandy which took the lives of numerous New Yorkers and caused billions of dollars of damage. At the conclusion of its hearings and deliberations, the Commission released a report which resulted in changes to New York State law and practices by utilities.

He also served on numerous boards of community not for profit organizations: Fund for the City of New York, Citizens Union Board Member and President of the Citizens Union Foundation, America Israel Friendship League, and Council for a Secure America.

Abrams was a leader of the Soviet Jewry Movement in the United States. Serving as chairman of the Greater New York Conference on Soviet Jewry, he attended several international conferences, in Paris where delegates met to plan strategy for the movement; in Brussels, where Golda Meir, U.S. Senator Frank Church, Nobel laureate Elie Wiesel, and civil rights leader Bayard Rustin addressed the convocation; and in Jerusalem at a world plenum which addressed Soviet Jewish absorption issues in Israel. In 1991, Abrams delivered the Raoul Wallenberg Lecture in Moscow before several hundred leaders of Jewish communities from each of the fifteen republics of the USSR.

He also served on the corporate boards of Sterling Bancorp and Sterling National Bank for 18 years.

On October 16, 2018, Abrams and Public Advocate Letitia James (running for New York State Attorney General) were at the steps of New York City Hall for a press conference where he announced his endorsement of James in the race. James became the first woman and the first African American to be elected to the position of New York State Attorney General and appointed Abrams as co-chair of her transition team.

Abrams resolved a controversy between the Jewish community and the Church of Jesus Christ of Latter-day Saints (LDS Church) concerning the church's proxy baptism practice. He established joint programs between the two communities, including initiating a joint Jewish-LDS delegation to visit Israel in 2016 to commemorate the 175th anniversary of LDS Apostle Orson Hyde's dedicatory prayer at the Mount of Olives declaring Jerusalem and its environs to be the land of the Jewish people. Abrams was presented with the Thomas L. Kane award by the J. Reuben Clark Law Society of the LDS Church on June 9, 2022, in Salt Lake City, in recognition of his leadership efforts.

In March 2021, Abrams' memoir, The Luckiest Guy in the World: My Journey in Politics, was published by Skyhorse Publishing.

== Personal life ==
On September 15, 1974, he married the daughter of Jacob and Hilda Schulder, Diane Schulder Abrams, an attorney who created and taught the first "Women and the Law" course in an American law school. Robert and Diane have two daughters, Rachel and Becky, and eight grandchildren.

Robert and Diane's second child Becky was born to them when Diane was 49 years old. They attribute her birth to a blessing they received from the Lubavitcher Rebbe.

== See also ==
- List of Jewish American jurists

New York State Assembly
| Preceded by John T. Satriale | Member of the New York State Assembly from the 89th district January 1, 1966 – December 31, 1966 | Succeeded by Robert Abrams |
| Preceded by Robert Abrams | Member of the New York State Assembly from the 81st district January 1, 1967 – December 31, 1969 | Succeeded by Alan Hochberg |
Political offices
| Preceded by Herman Badillo | Borough President of the Bronx; January 1, 1970 – December 31, 1978 | Succeeded by Stanley Simon |
Legal offices
| Preceded by Louis J. Lefkowitz | Attorney General of New York; January 1, 1979 – December 31, 1993 | Succeeded by G. Oliver Koppell |
Party political offices
| Preceded by Adam Walinsky | Democratic nominee for Attorney General of New York; 1974, 1978, 1982, 1986, 1990 | Succeeded by Karen Burstein |
| Preceded by Mark Green | Democratic nominee for U.S. Senator from New York (Class 3); 1992 | Succeeded by Chuck Schumer |
| Preceded by John S. Dyson | Liberal nominee for U.S. Senator from New York (Class 3); 1992 | Succeeded by Chuck Schumer |
