= Timeline of modern American conservatism =

Ronald Reagan gives a televised address from the Oval Office outlining his plan for tax reductions in July 1981 (excerpt).

This timeline of modern American conservatism lists important events, developments and occurrences that have affected conservatism in the United States. With the decline of the conservative wing of the Democratic Party following 1960, the movement is most closely associated with the Republican Party (GOP). Economic conservatives favor less government regulation, lower taxes and weaker labor unions while social conservatives focus on moral issues and neoconservatives focus on democracy worldwide. Mainstream conservatives generally distrust the United Nations and Europe and, apart from the libertarian wing, favor a strong military.

Although conservatism has much older roots in American history, the modern movement began to solidify in the mid-1930s when intellectuals and politicians collaborated with businessmen to oppose the liberalism of the New Deal led by President Franklin D. Roosevelt, newly energized labor unions, and big-city Democratic machines. After World War II, that coalition gained strength from new philosophers and writers who developed an intellectual rationale for conservatism.

Richard Nixon's victory in the 1968 election is often considered a realigning election in American politics. From 1932 to 1968, the Democratic Party was the majority party as during that time the Democrats had won seven out of nine presidential elections and their agenda gravely affected that undertaken by Republican Dwight D. Eisenhower administration, which was altered completely with Nixon's 1968 electoral victory. Democrats were largely split over whether to support or oppose the Vietnam War, and many whites felt the national Democratic Party had deserted them, leading many of them to vote Republican at the presidential level since the 1950s and at the state and local level since the 1990s.

In the 1980 presidential election and in his subsequent presidential administration, Ronald Reagan rejuvenated conservatism in the United States, supporting tax cuts, significantly increasing defense spending, deregulation, and breaking with the post-World War II foreign policy consensus of containing the Soviet Union and instead introducing and advancing the Reagan Doctrine, which sought to rollback global communism and bring an end to the Cold War.

Reagan also supported and advanced the ideals associated with family values and a “Judeo-Christian” morality, leading many historians to call the 1980s the Reagan era. In the 21st century, issues such as abortion, gun control, euthanasia, assisted suicide, LGBTQ rights, and foreign policy have grown in importance to many American conservatives. Since 2009, the Tea Party movement has energized conservatives at the local level against the policies made by the presidency of Barack Obama, leading to Republican success in the 2010 and 2014 mid-term elections, and the 2016 election, in which Donald Trump was elected president.

== Chronology of events ==
=== 1930s ===
As the nation plunged into its deepest depression ever, Republicans and conservatives fall into disfavor in 1930, 1932 and 1934, losing more and more of their seats. Liberals (mostly Democrats with a few Republicans and independents) come to power with the landslide 1932 election of liberal Democrat Franklin D. Roosevelt. In his first 100 days Roosevelt pushes through a series of dramatic economic programs known as the New Deal.

Major metropolitan newspapers generally opposed the New Deal, including those owned by William Randolph Hearst and his Hearst chain Robert R. McCormick, who then owned the Chicago Tribune, compared the New Deal to communism and was an America First isolationist who strongly opposed entering World War II. McCormick also railed against the League of Nations, the World Court, and socialism.

1934

- Opposition to New Deal policies first takes shape as the American Liberty League. Led by conservative Democrats such as Al Smith, it fades after Roosevelt's 1936 landslide and disbands in 1940. Businessmen begin organizing their opposition especially to labor unions.

1935

- Former President Herbert Hoover develops his critique of New Deal liberalism based on the values of liberty, limited government, and constitutionalism.

1936

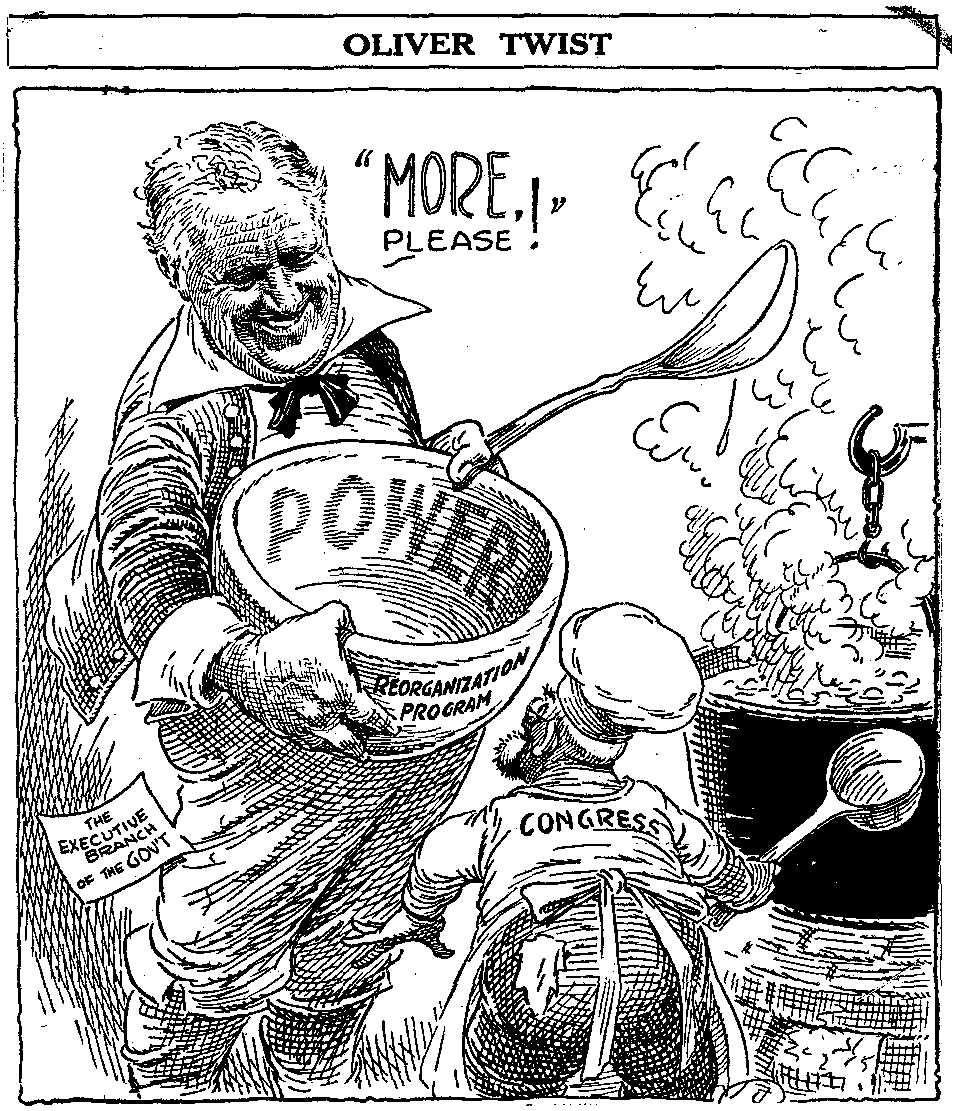
1937 cartoon by Joseph L. Parrish in the Chicago Tribune warning Franklin D. Roosevelt's executive branch reorganization plan is a power grab

- President Roosevelt calls his opponents "conservatives" as a term of abuse, they reply that they are "true liberals".
- Most publishers favor Republican moderate Alf Landon for president. In the nation's 15 largest cities the newspapers that editorially endorsed Landon represented 70% of the circulation, while Roosevelt won 69% of the actual voters.
- Roosevelt carries 46 of the 48 states and liberals gain in both the House and the Senate, thanks to newly energized labor unions, city machines, and the WPA. Since 1928 the GOP has lost 178 House seats, 40 Senate seats, and 19 governorships; it retains a mere 89 seats in the House and 16 in the Senate.

1937

- Roosevelt's plan to pack the Supreme Court alienates conservative Democrats; most newspapers which supported FDR in 1936 oppose the plan, with many warning it was a prelude to dictatorship.
- Conservative Republicans (nearly all from the North) and conservative Democrats (most from the South), form the Conservative Coalition and block most new liberal proposals until the 1960s.
- The Conservative Manifesto (originally titled "An Address to the People of the United States") rallies the opposition to Roosevelt. It is drafted by Senators Josiah Bailey (D-NC) and Arthur H. Vandenberg (R-MI).
- The liberal American Federation of Labor (AFL) and more leftist Congress of Industrial Organizations (CIO) labor federations are both growing and both support FDR. Their bitter feud over jurisdiction, however, produces numerous strikes, angers public opinion and weakens their political power.

1938

- Opponents of conservatism weaken sharply. FDR's allies in the AFL and CIO battle each other; his court-packing plan is rejected; his attempt to purge the conservatives from the Democratic Party fails and strengthens them; the sharp recession of 1937–1938 discredits his argument that New Deal policies would lead to full recovery.
- The Republicans make major gains in the House and Senate in the 1938 elections.
- Leo Strauss (1899–1973), a refugee from Nazi Germany, teaches political philosophy at the New School for Social Research in New York (1938–49) and the University of Chicago (1949–1969). He was not an activist but his ideas have been influential.

1939

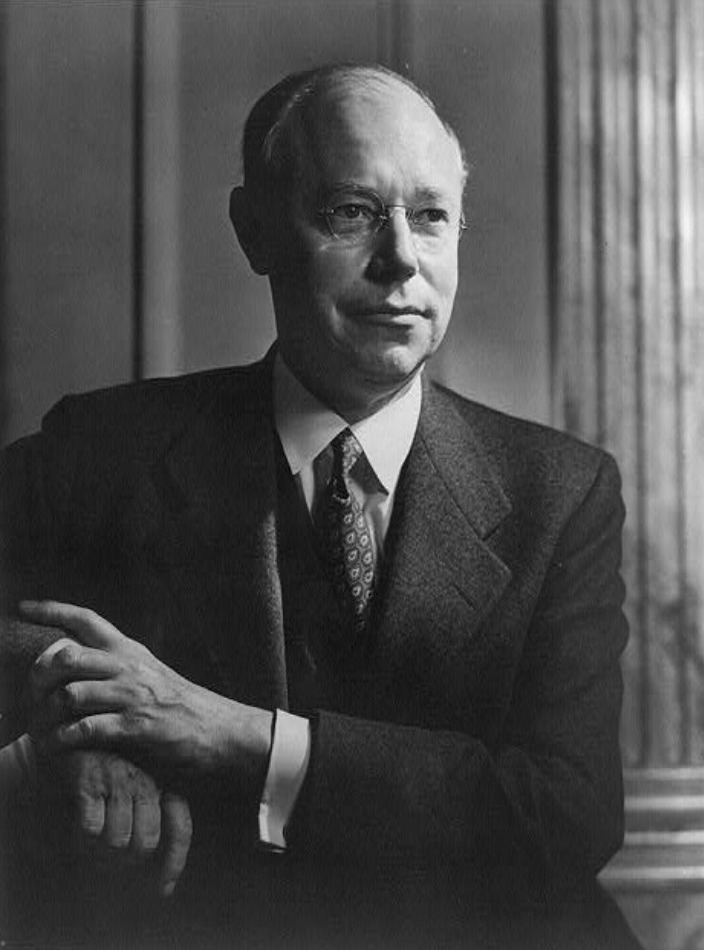
Robert A. Taft

- As Republican senator from Ohio (1939–53), Robert A. Taft leads the conservative opposition to liberal policies (apart from public housing and aid to education, which he supported). Taft opposed most of the New Deal, entry into World War II, NATO, and sending troops to the Korean War. He was not so much an "isolationist" as a staunch opponent of the ever-expanding powers of the White House. The growth of this power, Taft feared, would lead to dictatorship or at least spoil American democracy, republicanism and civil virtue.

=== 1940s ===
1943

- Medical missionary Walter Judd (1898–1994) enters Congress (1943–63) and defines the conservative position on China as all-out support for the Nationalists under Chiang Kai-shek and opposition to the Communists under Mao. Judd redoubled his support after the Nationalists in 1949 fled to Formosa (Taiwan).
- The American Enterprise Institute (AEI) is founded in Washington "to defend the principles and improve the institutions of American freedom and democratic capitalism—limited government, private enterprise, individual liberty and responsibility, vigilant and effective defense and foreign policies, political accountability, and open debate."

1944

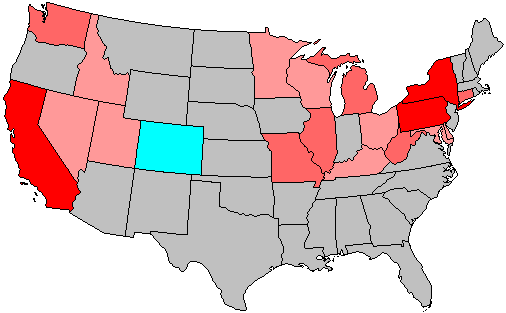
Party change of House seats in 1946 showcasing GOP landslide

- March: Friedrich Hayek, an Austrian-born British economist, publishes The Road to Serfdom, which is widely read in America and Britain. He warns that well-intentioned government intervention in the economy is a slippery slope that will lead to tight government controls over people's lives, just as medieval serfdom had done.
- The weekly magazine Human Events is founded by Frank Hanighen and Felix Morley with a significant contribution from ex-New Dealer Henry Regnery. Ronald Reagan later says that the magazine "helped me stop being a liberal Democrat."

1945

- Ludwig von Mises (1881–1973), having fled the Nazis, becomes professor of economics at New York University (1945–1969) where he disseminates Austrian School libertarianism.

1946

- Milton Friedman (1912–2006) is appointed professor of economics at the University of Chicago. Previously a Keynesian, Friedman moves right under the influence of his close friend George Stigler (1911–1991). He founds the market-oriented Chicago School of Economics which reshapes conservative economic theory. Stigler opposes regulation of industry as counterproductive; Friedman undermines Keynesian macroeconomics. Friedman wins the Nobel Prize in 1976 and Stigler in 1982.
- November 5: Republicans score landslide victories in the House and Senate in off-year elections and set about enacting a conservative agenda in the 80th Congress.

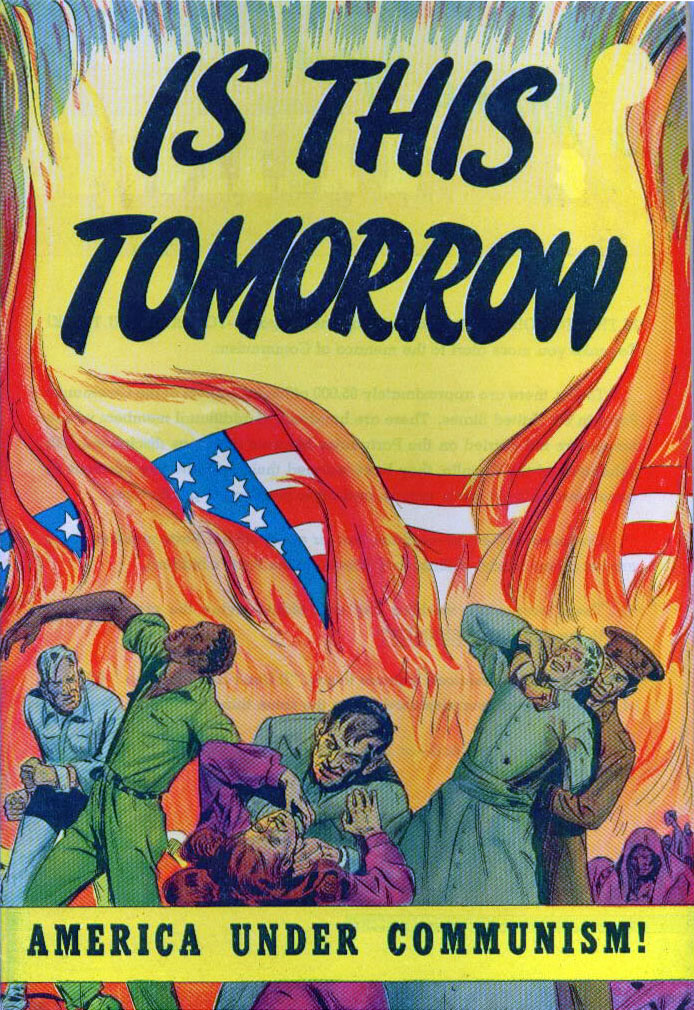
Warning against communism, 1947

1947

- June: Congress passes the Taft-Hartley Act, designed by conservatives to create what they consider a proper balance between the rights of management and the rights of labor. Unions call it a slave labor law; Truman vetoes it and both houses override the veto.

1948

- Deep South Democrats led by Strom Thurmond split from the National Democratic Party to form the pro-segregation States' Rights Democratic Party or Dixiecrat party. They protest the party's (weak) support for civil rights legislation and elect Thurmond as their presidential candidate in the 1948 election. Nearly all return to the Democratic party in 1949.
- Scholar Richard M. Weaver publishes Ideas Have Consequences, which influences intellectuals to question sophistic interpretations of literature.
- June: Liberal Republican Thomas Dewey again wins the Republican nomination, to the frustration of conservatives.
- November: Pundits are astonished when Dewey loses to incumbent Democrat Harry S. Truman in the presidential election.

=== 1950s ===
After the war, businessmen opposed to New Deal liberalism read Hayek, fight labor unions, and fund politicized think tanks such as American Enterprise Institute (founded 1943). They promote statewide right-to-work campaigns.

1950

- The intellectual reputation of conservatism reaches a low ebb; Lionel Trilling observes that "liberalism is not only the dominant but even the sole intellectual tradition" and dismisses conservatism as a series of "irritable mental gestures which seek to resemble ideas."
- February: Republican Senator Joseph McCarthy gives a speech saying, "While I cannot take the time to name all the men in the State Department who have been named as members of the Communist Party and members of a spy ring, I have here in my hand a list of 205." The speech marks the beginning of McCarthy's anti-communist pursuits.

1951

- Political philosopher Francis Wilson in The Case for Conservatism (1951) defines conservatism as "a philosophy of social evolution, in which certain lasting values are defended within the framework of the tension of political conflict. And when given values are at stake the conservative can even become a revolutionary."
- William F. Buckley Jr. with publisher Henry Regnery Company release God and Man at Yale to mixed reviews.

1952

- In securing the Republican Party presidential nomination, Dwight D. "Ike" Eisenhower leads moderate and liberal Republicans to victory over Sen. Robert A. Taft, the conservative champion. Ike then wins the presidency in a landslide by denouncing the failures of the Truman Administration in terms of "Korea, Communism and Corruption."

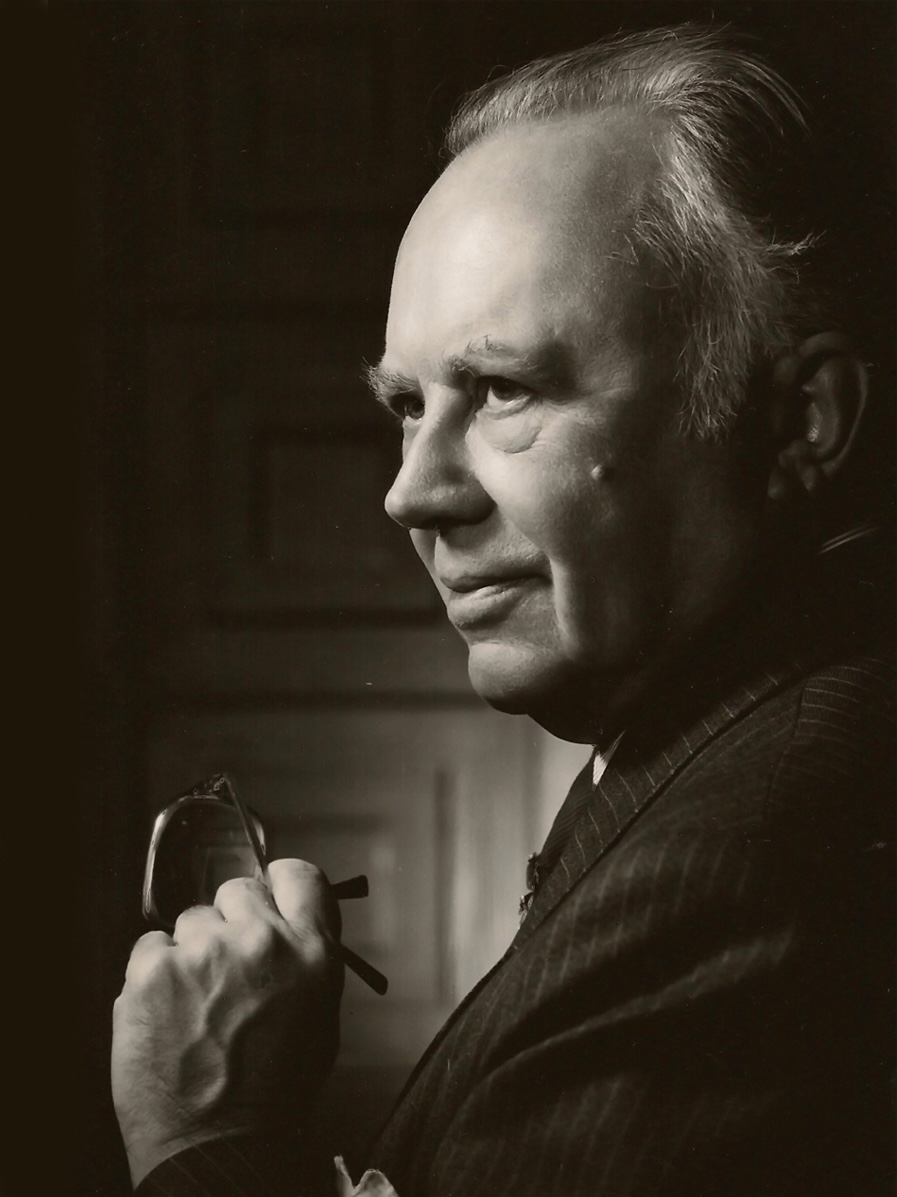
Russell Kirk

- Four major works of intellectual history that would influence conservatism are published: Daniel J. Boorstin's The Genius of American Politics, Peter Viereck's Conservatism: From John Adams to Churchill, Russell Kirk's The Conservative Mind, and Robert Nisbet's Quest for Community
- Intercollegiate Studies Institute (ISI) is founded by libertarian journalist Frank Chodorov (1887–1966) to counter the growing spread of collectivism; its original name was Intercollegiate Society of Individualists.

1953

- President Eisenhower works closely with Senator Taft, the new GOP majority leader, on domestic issues; they differ on foreign policy.

1955

- The National Review weekly magazine is founded by William F. Buckley, Jr. (1925–2008). The editors include representative traditionalists, Catholics, libertarians and ex-communists. The most notable were Russell Kirk, James Burnham, Frank Meyer, Willmoore Kendall, L. Brent Bozell, Jr., and Whittaker Chambers.
- In The Liberal Tradition in American, Louis Hartz claims that there has never been a European-style conservative tradition in America and that the sole mainstream tradition is Lockean liberalism.

1957

- Russian-born philosopher Ayn Rand (1905–1982) publishes her novel Atlas Shrugged; it attracts the libertarian wing of American conservatism by promoting aggressive entrepreneurship and rejecting religion and altruism. She influences even those conservative intellectuals who reject her ethical system such as Buckley and Whittaker Chambers.

1958

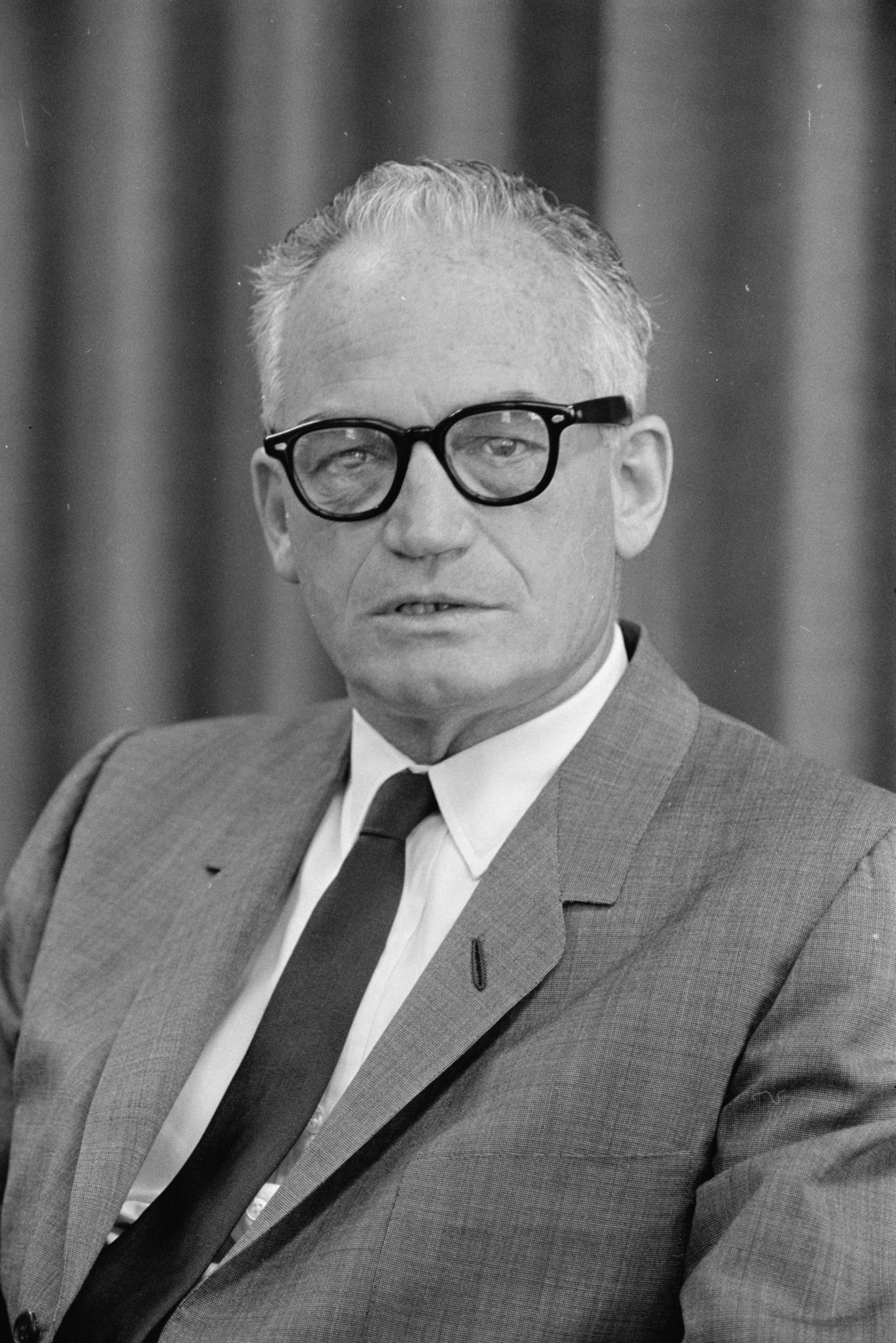
Barry Goldwater

- Vermont C. Royster (1914–1996) becomes editor of the editorial page of The Wall Street Journal (1958 to 1971). He wins two Pulitzer Prizes for his conservative interpretation of economic and political news.
- Conservatives try economic populism to appeal to blue collar workers forced to join labor unions. The GOP pushes "right-to-work" laws in California and elsewhere, but the unions counter-organize for the Democrats. Conservatives try again in 2011.
- November: In a deep economic recession the Democrats score a landslide victory, defeating many old-guard conservative Republicans. The new Congress has large Democratic majorities: 282 Democrats to 154 GOP in the House, 64 to 34 in the Senate. Nevertheless, the new Congress fails to pass any major liberal legislation as most committee chairs are Southern Democrats who support the Conservative Coalition. Two Republicans score upsets in the face of the landslide—liberal Nelson Rockefeller as Governor of New York, and Barry Goldwater as Senator from Arizona; both become presidential prospects.
- December: Businessman Robert W. Welch, Jr. (1899–1985) and twelve others found the John Birch Society, an anti-communist advocacy group with chapters across the country. Welch uses an elaborate control system that enables him to keep a very tight rein on each chapter. Its major activities are circulating petitions and supporting the local police. It becomes a favorite target of attack from the left and is disowned by many of the prominent conservatives of the day.

1959

- As late as 1959 William Buckley complains that conservatives were "bound together for the most part by negative response to liberalism," and that, philosophically, "there [is] no commonly-acknowledged conservative position."

=== 1960s ===
Liberalism made major gains after the assassination of John F. Kennedy in 1963, as Lyndon B. Johnson (LBJ) pushed through his liberal Great Society as well as civil rights laws. An unexpected bonanza helped conservatism in the late 1960s as liberalism came under intense attack from the New Left, especially in academe. This new element, says liberal historian Michael Kazin, worked to "topple the corrupted liberal order." For the New Left "liberal" became a nasty epithet. Liberal commentator E. J. Dionne finds that, "If liberal ideology began to crumble intellectually in the 1960s it did so in part because the New Left represented a highly articulate and able wrecking crew."

"A Time for Choosing" Speech
- In support of Goldwater in 1964, Reagan delivers the TV address "A Time for Choosing", a speech which made Reagan the leader of movement conservatism.
- Date: October 27, 1964
- Duration: 29:33
- Location: Los Angeles, CA, United States
- Also known as: "The Speech"
- Type: Televised campaign speech
- Participants: Ronald Reagan
- Website: Video clip, audio, transcript

Movement conservatism emerges as grassroots activists react to liberal and New Left agendas. It develops a structure that supports Goldwater in 1964 and Ronald Reagan in 1976–80. By the late 1970s, local evangelical churches join the movement. Liberalism faces a racial crisis nationwide. Within weeks of the passage of the 1964 Civil Rights law, "long hot summers" begin, lasting until 1970, with the worst outbreaks coming in the summer of 1967. Nearly 400 racial disorders in 298 cities saw blacks attacking shopkeepers and police, and looting stores. Meanwhile, the urban crime rates shoot up. Demands for "law and order" escalate and the backlash causes disillusionment among working class whites with the liberalism of the Democratic Party.

In the mid-1960s the GOP debates race and civil rights intensely. Republican liberals, led by Nelson Rockefeller, argue for a strong federal role because it was morally right and politically advantageous. Conservatives call for a more limited federal presence and discount the possibility of significant black voter support. Nixon avoids race issues in 1968.

Highlights of the 1960 Republican convention in Chicago, Illinois

1960

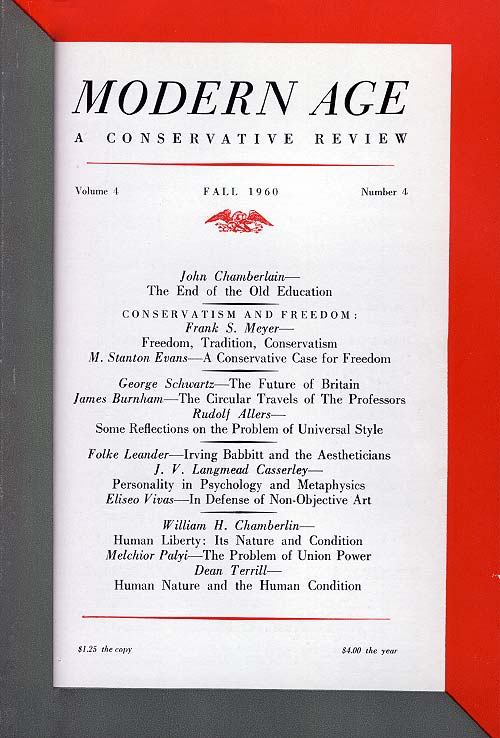
Cover of Modern Age

- Conservatives are angered when GOP presidential nominee Richard Nixon strikes a deal with liberal leader Nelson Rockefeller. Nixon agrees to put all 14 of Rockefeller's demands in the party platform, including promises that the executive branch be totally reorganized and that Rockefeller's liberal policies on economic growth, medical care for the aged and civil rights be included. Led by Goldwater, conservatives vow to organize at the grass roots and take control of the GOP.
- Barry Goldwater publishes The Conscience of a Conservative. The book helps the Arizona Senator reignite the conservative movement which rallies behind the charismatic Arizona Senator.
- Fall: Frank S. Meyer's article, "Freedom, Tradition, Conservatism", is published in Modern Age, argues that traditional conservatism and libertarianism share a common philosophical heritage. The concept comes to be known as "fusionism" and unites the two strands of thought.
- September: William F. Buckley, Jr., forms a youth group called the Young Americans for Freedom; it helps Goldwater win the 1964 nomination but is otherwise ineffective and collapses in internal bickering.
- November: Nixon loses a close election to liberal Democrat John F. Kennedy.

1961

- Christian Broadcasting Network (CBN) is founded by Pat Robertson; its signature program The 700 Club launches in 1966.
- May: Texas elects Senator John Tower; he is the first Republican from the former Confederacy ever to win popular election and begins the growth of the GOP in that state.

1962

- Buckley and the National Review launch denunciations of the John Birch Society; Goldwater agrees; the attack limits its influence to the conspiracy-minded.

1963

The controversial "Daisy" Johnson TV commercial in 1964 attacks Goldwater foreign policy as inviting nuclear war.

- January: Governor of Alabama, Democrat George Wallace, electrifies the white South by proclaiming "segregation now, segregation tomorrow, segregation forever!" Wallace's angry populist rhetoric appeals to the poor farmers and workers who comprise a major part of the New Deal Coalition. He does well in Democratic primaries in the industrial North as well as the rural South. He exploits distrust of government, racial fear, anti-communism and a yearning for "traditional" American values.

In support of Goldwater, Reagan delivers the address, "A Time for Choosing", which speech launches Reagan to national prominence.

1964

- June: Senator Everett Dirksen (R-IL) plays a key role in passage of the 1964 Civil Rights Act to end segregation, but Goldwater joins Southern Democrats in voting against it.

In the 1964 presidential election, Goldwater only won his home state of Arizona and five states in the Deep South.

- Jul: George Wallace gives a speech condemning the Civil Rights Act of 1964, claiming that it would threaten individual liberty, free enterprise and private property rights and that "The liberal left-wingers have passed it. Now let them employ some pinknik social engineers in Washington, D.C., to figure out what to do with it."
- July: Goldwater defeats liberal Republicans Rockefeller to win the GOP presidential nomination and launch a conservative crusade.
- July: Under attack as an "extremist," Goldwater lashes back in his speech accepting the GOP nomination:
  I would remind you that extremism in the defense of liberty is no vice! And let me remind you also that moderation in the pursuit of justice is no virtue!
- November: In the presidential election, Goldwater is defeated in a landslide, and many GOP congressmen are defeated with him.
- December: The American Conservative Union, the oldest conservative lobbying organization in the United States, is founded by William F. Buckley, Jr.

1965

- William F. Buckley Jr. gains national attention by running for mayor of New York City on the ticket of the new Conservative Party of New York State. He loses the election but gains visibility and respectability for the cause in the aftermath of Goldwater's defeat.

1966

- April: Socialist Norman Thomas appears on the premiere episode of Firing Line with host William F. Buckley. The program remains on the air for 33 years and is the longest running television program with the same host.
- November: Republicans score major gains in the off-year elections, emphasizing issues of law and order. Liberal candidates endorsed by the AFL–CIO do poorly. Ronald Reagan is elected governor of California.

1967

- New Left students hold highly publicized rallies chanting, "Hey– Hey– LBJ– How many kids did you kill today?". Their confrontational rhetoric and efforts to disrupt the draft alienates millions of voters who move to the right.
- A generational rift opens as leftist students espouse Marxism, sexual freedom, marijuana, rock music and long hair that outrages the older generation. Elite colleges and universities come under heavy pressure (but not the smaller state schools and community colleges that generally remain calm).

1968 presidential election results in which red denotes states won by Nixon/Agnew, blue denotes those won by Humphrey/Muskie and orange denotes states won by Wallace/LeMay

- The American Spectator monthly political magazine is founded by Emmett Tyrrell; its name until 1977 was The Alternative: An American Spectator.
- Phyllis Schlafly launches the Eagle Trust Fund, a precursor to the conservative think tank Eagle Forum.

1968

- Liberalism collapses politically as the Democratic Party splits into five factions over issues of Vietnam, race and attacks from New Left. Richard Nixon is elected president over Hubert Humphrey and George Wallace (American Independent Party), emphasizing the need for law and order. The New Left denounced Humphrey as a war criminal, Nixon attacked him as the New Left's enabler—a man with "a personal attitude of indulgence and permissiveness toward the lawless." Beinart observes that "with the country divided against itself, contempt for Hubert Humphrey was the one thing on which left and right could agree."

1969

- Libertarian economists, especially Milton Friedman and Walter Oi, lead the intellectual charge against the draft. Nixon abolishes it as the Vietnam War ends in 1973.
- Young Americans for Freedom splits into competing, irreconcilable factions. The libertarians, influenced by Ayn Rand, split from the traditionalists and form the Society for Individual Liberty.

=== 1970s ===
Historians Meg Jacobs and Julian Zelizer argue that the 1970s were characterized by "a vast shift toward social and political conservatism," as well as a sharp decline in the proportion of voters who identified with liberalism. Neoconservatism emerges as liberals become disenchanted with Lyndon B. Johnson's Great Society welfare programs. They increasingly focus on foreign policy, especially anti-communism, and support for Israel and for democracy in the Third World.

While Nixon continues to antagonize and anger liberals, many of his programs upset conservatives. His foreign policy with Henry Kissinger focuses on détente with the USSR and China, and becomes a main target of conservatives. Nixon is uninterested in tax cuts or deregulation, but he does use executive orders and presidential authority to impose price and wage controls, expand the welfare state, require Affirmative Action, grow the National Endowment for the Humanities and the National Endowment for the Arts, and create the Environmental Protection Agency (EPA).

1970

- November: James L. Buckley is elected Senator for New York with 39% of the vote, running as a candidate for the Conservative Party of New York.

1971

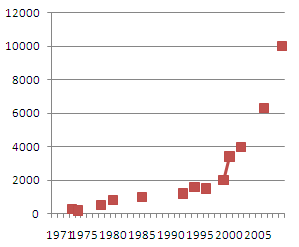
Number of Conservative Political Action Conference attendees over time

- Socialist Michael Harrington popularizes the term "neoconservative" for liberals who switch on foreign policy and domestic issues.
- December 11: Libertarians meeting at the home of David Nolan organize the Libertarian Party which nominates John Hospers for president in 1972. John Hospers receives one electoral vote from a faithless elector.

1972

- Richard Nixon wins a landslide reelection, carrying 49 states against anti-war liberal George McGovern. Suspicious of Democratic trickery, Nixon sends agents to bug the Democratic National Headquarters, then covers up his tracks when they are caught in the Watergate scandal.
- Phyllis Schlafly forms the "STOP (Stop Taking Our Privileges) ERA" movement; it blocks passage of the Equal Rights Amendment (ERA).
- Robert L. Bartley (1937–2003) becomes editor of the editorial page of The Wall Street Journal; he retires in 2002 after writing and supervising tens of thousands of editorials taking a conservative position on economic and political issues. He is called "the most influential editorial writer" of his day.

1973

- Traditional conservative Jesse Helms of North Carolina takes his Senate seat; he retires in 2002. As long-time chairman of the powerful Senate Foreign Relations Committee, he demands a staunchly anti-communist foreign policy that would reward America's friends abroad, and punish its enemies. His relations with the State Department are often acrimonious, and he blocks numerous presidential appointees. His National Congressional Club uses state-of-the-art direct mail operation to raise millions for conservative candidates and for Helms' own sharply contested reelections. Helms also became a frequent target of attacks from the left and ended up being shunned by many mainstream conservatives at the end of his career.
- The American Conservative Union and Young Americans for Freedom start the Conservative Political Action Conference (CPAC) as a "small gathering of dedicated conservatives."
- The Heritage Foundation is founded by Paul Weyrich, Edwin Feulner and Joseph Coors.
- May: In response to the United States Supreme Court decision in Roe v. Wade, the National Right to Life Committee is formed, the oldest and largest anti-abortion organization in the United States.

1974

- Robert Grant founds the American Christian Cause as an effort to institutionalize the Christian right as a politically active social movement.
- January: The first March for Life attracts 20,000 supporters in Washington.
- August: Conservatives, led by Goldwater, desert Nixon when the "smoking gun" is discovered that proves Nixon covered up the crimes of the Watergate scandal. Nixon resigns in disgrace, but his Secretary of State Henry Kissinger stays on in the moderately conservative administration of Gerald R. Ford.

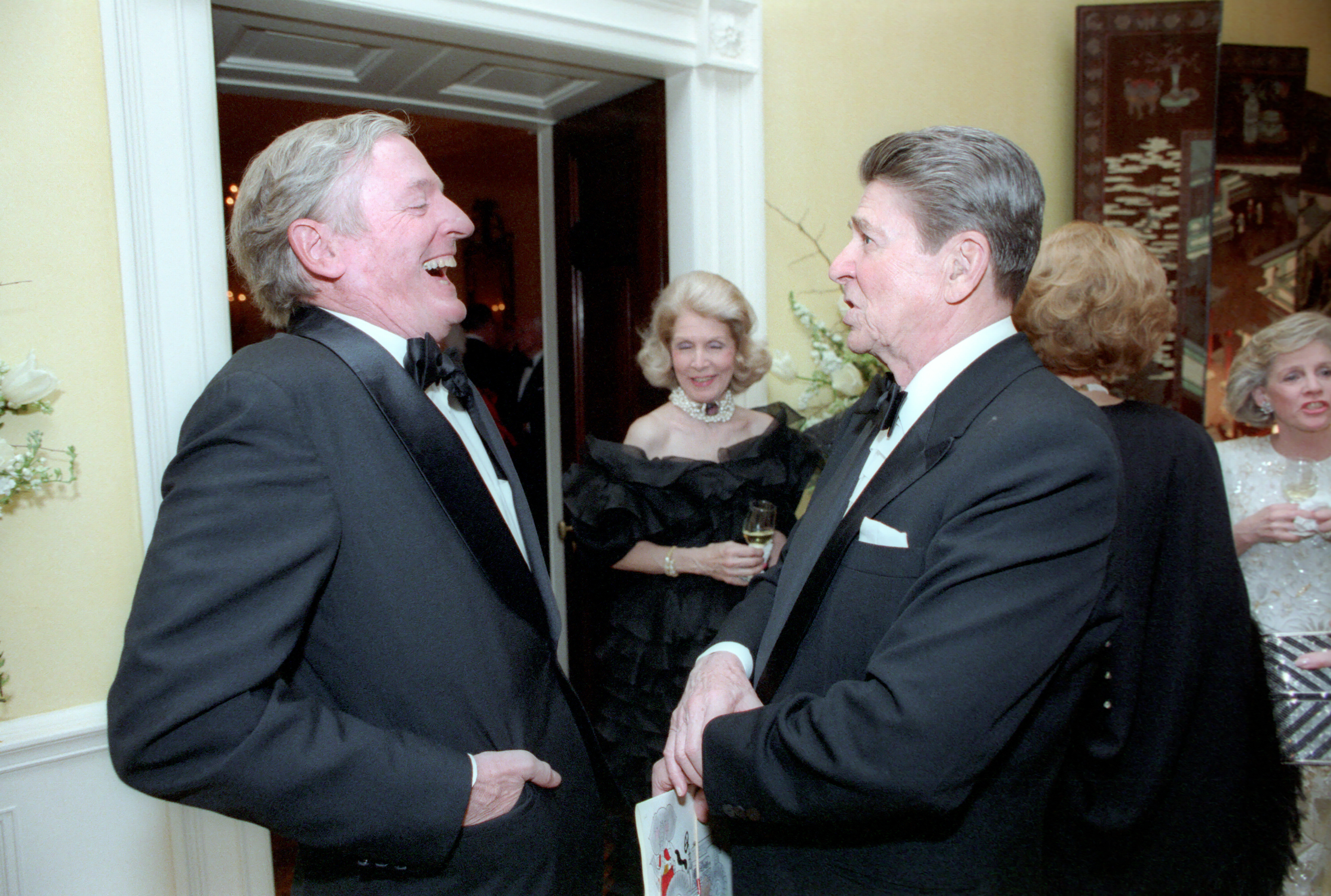
William F. Buckley Jr. (left) and Ronald Reagan, two of the most visible conservatives of the 1970s and 1980s

- November: Liberal Democrats attack Watergate and score major victories in the off-year elections.

1976

- Commentary, a monthly Jewish magazine on politics, foreign policy, society and cultural issues that began as a liberal voice in the 1940s moves sharply to the right by the mid-1970s under editor Norman Podhoretz. It becomes an influential voice for Israel, anti-communism and neoconservatism by 1976, and supports Reagan in the 1980s.
- George H. Nash publishes The Conservative Intellectual Movement in America Since 1945, arguing that Buckley's National Review fused together the traditional, libertarian and anti-Communist traditions to forge a conservative intellectual movement.

1977

- Focus on the Family is founded by psychologist James Dobson. The New York Times later calls Dobson "the nation's most influential evangelical leader."
- The Save Our Children movement is formed by celebrity singer Anita Bryant to oppose the gay rights movement.

1978

- Robert Grant, Paul Weyrich, Terry Dolan, Howard Phillips, and Richard Viguerie found Christian Voice, to recruit, train, and organize evangelical Christians to participate in elections. Grant later ousts the others.
- June: California unleashes a tax revolt, with Proposition 13 to limit property taxes, promoted by Howard Jarvis (1903–1986), a long-time activist. The movement was backed by the United Organizations of Taxpayers, the Los Angeles Apartment Owners Association and realtors' associations. Preconditions included steadily rising property taxes, "stagflation" and growing anger at government waste. California's tax revolt was followed by 30 other states.

1979

- In reaction against liberal and presidential support for the UN's International Women's Year, conservative women meet in Houston to coordinate their grass roots work. Led by Phyllis Schlafly, they block passage of the ERA and work to nominate Ronald Reagan as the Republican candidate for president.
- Beverly LaHaye and eight other women found Concerned Women for America (CWA) to oppose the Equal Rights Amendment. It later expands its scope to address socially conservative issues. CWA has been described as "a key player in conservative evangelical politics" and according to CWA it is the largest women's organization in the United States.
- February: Irving Kristol is featured on the cover of Esquire under the caption, "the godfather of the most powerful new political force in America – neoconservatism."
- June: Jerry Falwell founds Moral Majority, marking the reentry of Fundamentalists into partisan politics.

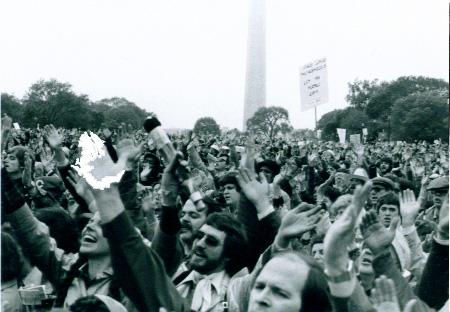
Washington for Jesus, 1980

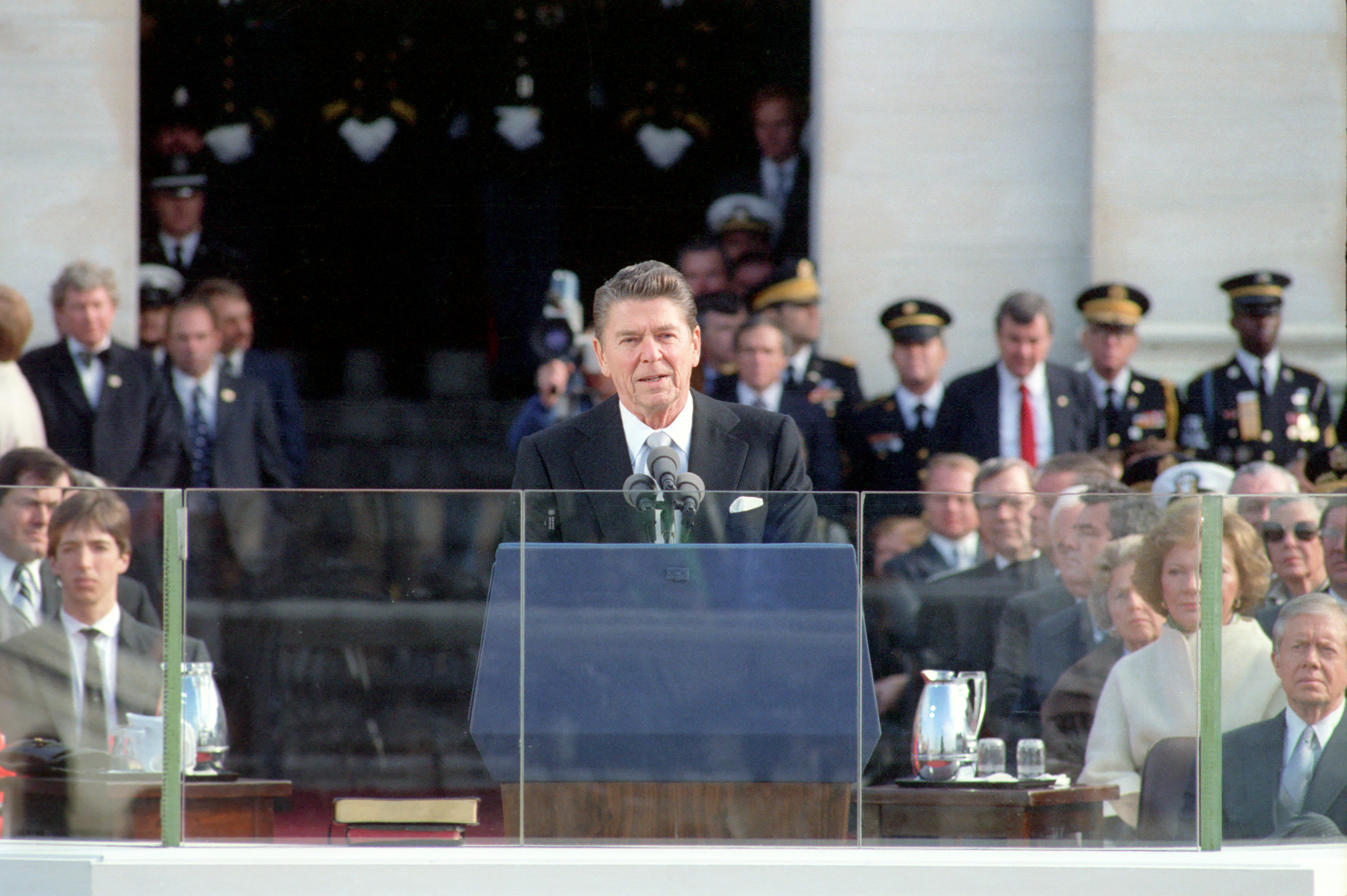

First inaugural address of Ronald Reagan, 1981 (audio only)

=== 1980s ===
The decade is marked by the rise of the Christian right and the Reagan Revolution. A priority of Reagan's administration is the rollback of Soviet communism in Latin America, Africa and worldwide. Reagan bases his economic policy, dubbed "Reaganomics", on supply-side economics.

1980

- April: Washington for Jesus marches in support of Reagan's positions on social issues as Pat Robertson brings together a theologically diverse coalition of charismatics, Pentecostals, Southern Baptists, and other evangelicals.
- November: After denouncing Jimmy Carter's failed presidency, Reagan is elected president running on a "peace through strength" platform. Republicans capture the Senate for the first time since 1953.

1981

- Reagan promotes "supply side economics", arguing that tax cuts will stimulate the economy, which suffers high unemployment and high inflation (called "stagflation").
- Reagan forms a coalition in Congress with conservative Democrats and passes his major tax cuts and increases in defense spending. He fails to cut welfare spending.
- The Cold War heats up as Reagan pursues a rollback strategy in Latin America and Africa. He supports the anti-Communist "Contra" rebels who attempt to overthrow the pro-Communist Sandinista regime in Nicaragua. Liberal Democrats in Congress try to block his moves and undercut the Contras, leading to a series of battles in the halls of Congress in which Reagan (mostly) prevails. The Sandinistas are forced to hold fair elections in 1990, which they lose by 41%–55%.

1982

- June: President Reagan tells the British Parliament that "the march of freedom and democracy will leave Marxism and Leninism on the ash heap of history" and calls for a "crusade for freedom."

1983

- March: President Reagan in a speech delivered to the National Association of Evangelicals denounces the Soviet Union (USSR) as an "Evil Empire".

"Evil Empire"
Ronald Reagan delivers "Evil Empire" speech on March 8, 1983

- The International Democrat Union, also called the Conservative International, a transnational alliance of conservative and liberal conservative political parties, is founded in London. Officers of the Konrad Adenauer Foundation and Vice President George H. W. Bush are instrumental in the founding.

1984

- November: proclaiming it's "Morning in America!" Reagan is reelected in a 49-state landslide victory over liberal Democrat Walter Mondale.

1986

- September: Associate Justice William Rehnquist is confirmed as Chief Justice of the Supreme Court. Reagan chooses Rehnquist in a deliberate effort to move the Court to the right, knowing he has the conservative constitutional agenda firmly in mind.
- Replacing Rehnquist as Associate Justice, Antonin Scalia is confirmed by the Senate 90–0. He has been called "the creative, brilliant, and outspoken intellectual leader of the Court's conservative majority."
- October: Congress enacts the Tax Reform Act of 1986, the second of the "Reagan Tax Cuts". The act simplifies the tax code, reduces the marginal income tax rate on the wealthiest Americans from 50% to 28%, and increases the marginal tax rate on the lowest-earning taxpayers from 10% to 15%.
- November: the Iran Contra scandal draws national attention and threatened to derail Reagan's progress. Working with the CIA Reagan had authorized National Security Council officials to engage in a complicated sale of missiles to Iran with the goal of funding the Contras fighting Nicaragua. Blame increasingly centered on the key operative, Oliver North. However, in week-long dramatic testimony North emerges a conservative hero. North is convicted on minor counts but the conviction is reversed on appeal because he did not receive a fair trial. Reagan's reputation survives and he leaves office more popular than he began.

1987

- June: In Berlin, President Reagan announces American terms for ending the Cold War, challenging Soviet leader Mikhail Gorbachev to "Tear down this wall!"; Gorbachev allows the Berlin Wall to come down in November 1989, ending Soviet control over Eastern European satellites.

"Tear down this wall"
Complete speech by Ronald Reagan at the Brandenburg Gate, June 12, 1987

- August: The Federal Communications Commission abolishes the Fairness Doctrine. Talk radio becomes dominated by conservative hosts.
- August: Pat Robertson (b. 1930), an Evangelical minister, founds the Christian Coalition, which becomes a prominent voice in the Christian right. Robertson also telecasts news and commentary on his own network, the Christian Broadcasting Network (CBN), founded in 1961. He runs poorly in the 1988 GOP presidential race and withdraws.

1988

- August: The Rush Limbaugh Show debuts on Premiere Radio Networks and will become the highest-rated talk radio show in the United States.
- November George H. W. Bush is elected president.

1989

- November: the Berlin Wall falls as the satellite states free themselves from Soviet control. West Germany absorbs East Germany in 1990, and in late 1991 Communism collapses in Russia as the red flag is lowered for the last time. Reagan becomes a hero in Eastern Europe.

=== 1990s ===
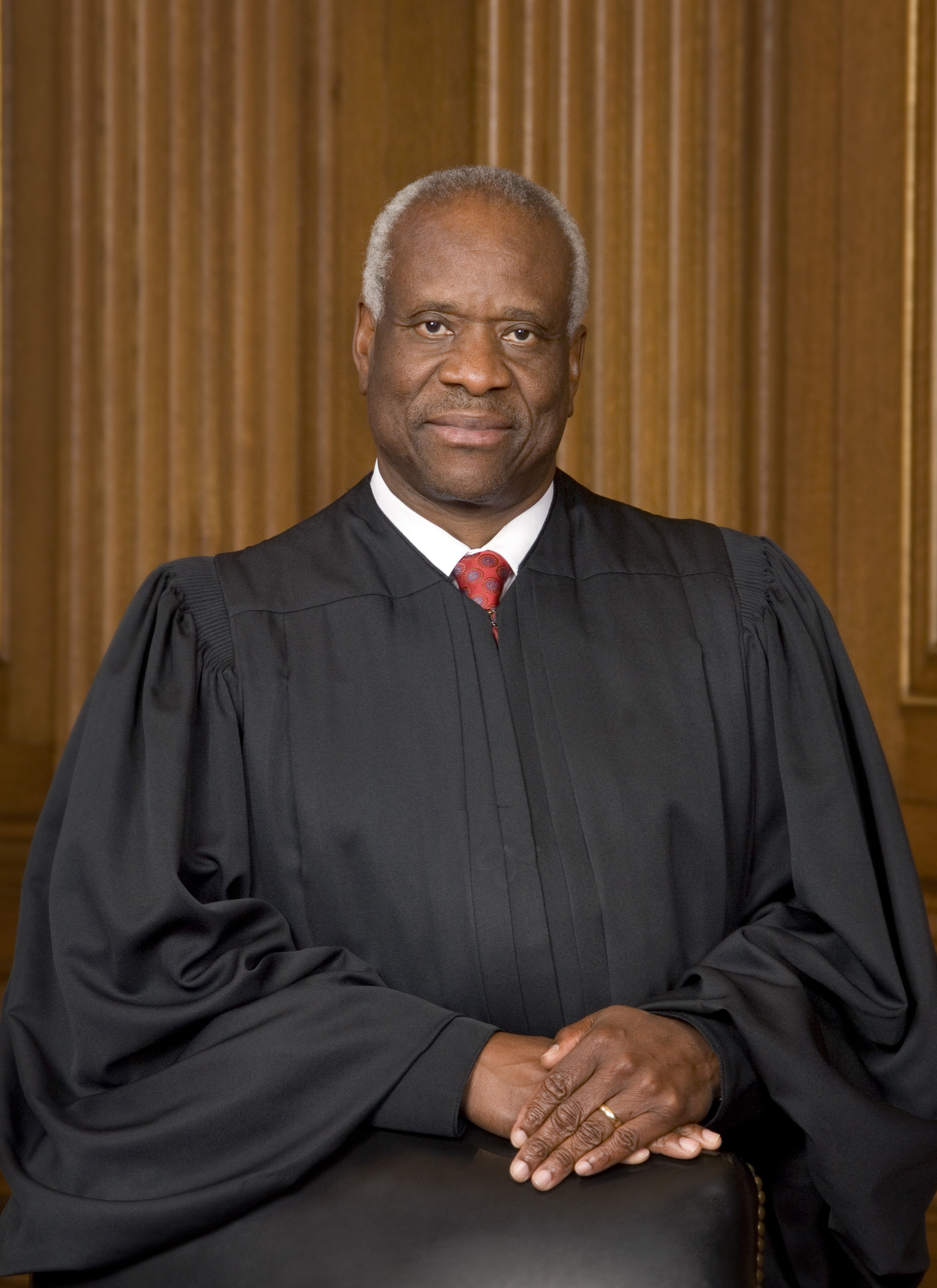
Clarence Thomas

Conservative think tanks 1990–97 mobilize to challenge the legitimacy of global warming as a social problem. They challenge the scientific evidence, argue that global warming will have benefits, and warn that proposed solutions would do more harm than good.

1991

- October: Clarence Thomas, a black Republican, is confirmed as an Associate Justice of the Supreme Court after controversial hearings that focus less on his strongly conservative beliefs than his relationship with one of his aides, Anita Hill, who accuses him of sexual harassment.

1992

- November: George H. W. Bush is defeated by Bill Clinton in the presidential election. Bush had alienated much of his conservative base by breaking his 1988 campaign pledge: "Read my lips: no new taxes" He also seemed much more interested in remote foreign affairs than the domestic issues that concerned most voters.

"Read my lips: no new taxes"
George H. W. Bush speaking about taxes at the 1988 Republican National Convention

1994

- September: The Contract with America is released on the steps of the Capitol. Designed by GOP House Whip Newt Gingrich, it had the effect of "nationalizing" the off-year election, as most Republican candidates endorsed it and used it as a template to promote a conservative agenda in economic policy. The Contract avoided divisive social issues.
- November: in the Republican Revolution, Republicans take control of the House of Representatives for the first time in 40 years. The Democrats lose 52 seats in the House and 8 in the Senate, giving the GOP margins of 230 to 204 and 53 to 47.

1995

- January: Newt Gingrich becomes Speaker of the House. His "Contract with America" scores mixed results in Congress. Its main points (and their fate in Congress) were:

Legislation	Result
Welfare reform	Passed (Personal Responsibility and Work Opportunity Act of 1996)
Term limits for Congressmen	Did not pass (U.S. Term Limits, Inc. v. Thornton)
Balanced budget amendment	Did not pass
Increase rights of victims of crime	Passed (Taking Back Our Streets Act)
Pro-family tax credits	Passed (American Dream Restoration Act)
Decrease United States role in the United Nations	Did not pass
Capital gains tax cut	Passed (Job Creation and Wage Enhancement Act)
Limit punitive damages on product liability	Passed, but vetoed (Product Liability Fairness Act)

- September: The Weekly Standard, founded by William Kristol, Fred Barnes and John Podhoretz, publishes its first issue. It is known as "a redoubt of 'conservatism'".

1996

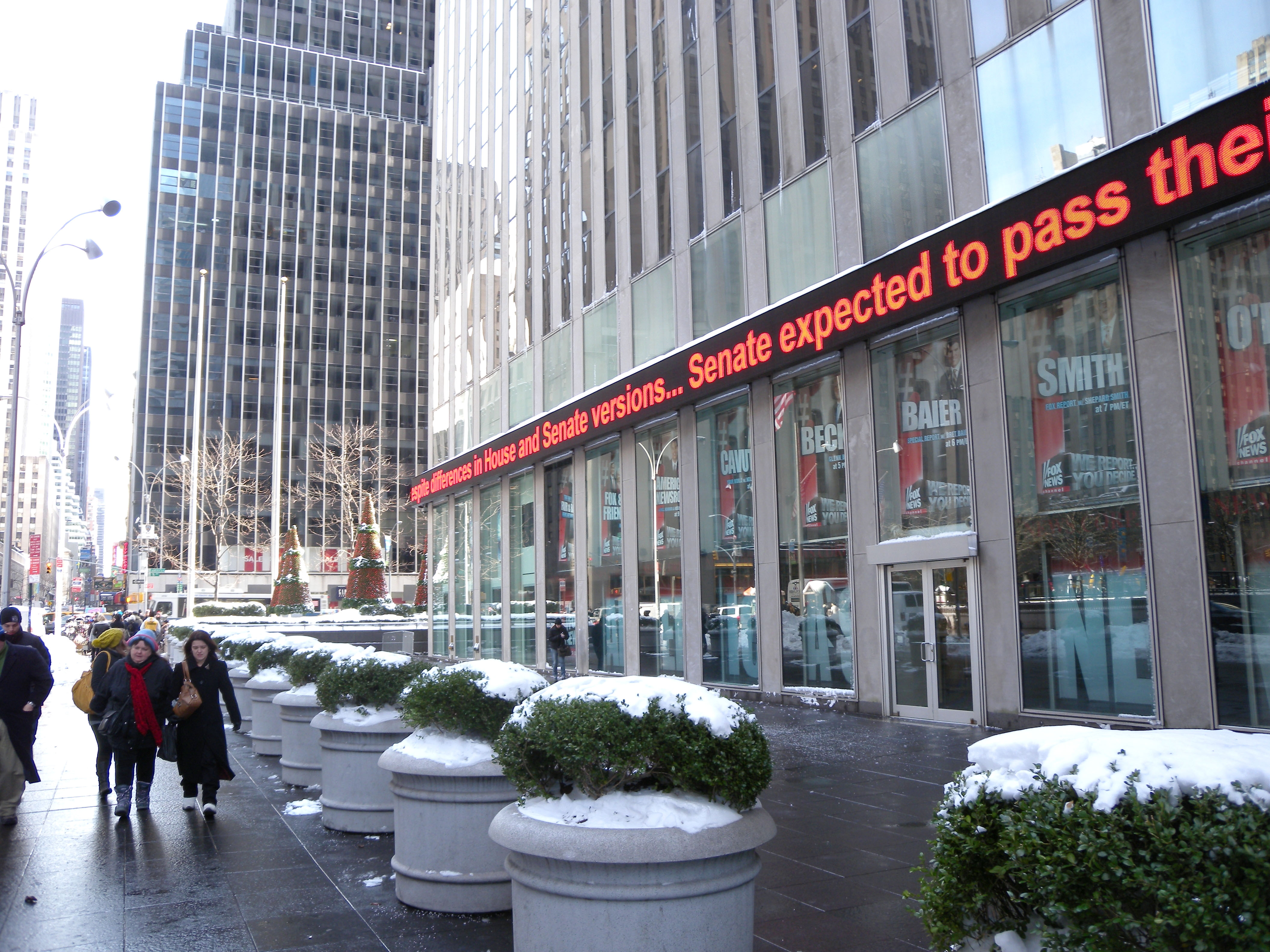
Fox News building on 48th Street

- September: Congress passes and Clinton signs the Defense of Marriage Act. DOMA was ruled unconstitutional by the Supreme Court in 2013.
- October: Australian media mogul Rupert Murdoch launches Fox News Network. Its strong appeal to conservative viewers on cable television soon gives it more viewers than arch-rival Cable News Network (CNN).

1997

- Matt Drudge launches his news website the Drudge Report. His first assistant is Andrew Breitbart (1969–2012), who later becomes a prominent conservative voice on the web. The Drudge Report achieves national prominence on January 17, 1998, when it publishes a story which comes to be known as the Monica Lewinsky scandal.
- September: Christopher W. Ruddy starts conservative news website Newsmax. Its hourly updates provided timely ammunition to conservative talk show hosts.

=== 2000s ===
The terror attack on September 11, 2001, reorients the administration towards foreign policy and terrorism issues, providing an opportunity for neoconservatives to have a greater influence on foreign policy. The Bush Doctrine leads to long-term interventions in Afghanistan (2001–2021) and Iraq (2003–2011).

On the domestic front Bush promises compassionate conservatism and works to improve education, address poverty nationwide, increase financial aid to poor countries and help alleviate AIDS in Africa.

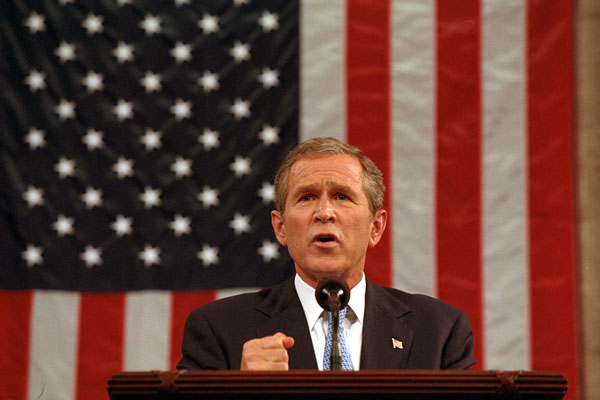

At a joint session of Congress, President Bush pledges to defend America's freedom against the fear of terrorism, a policy known as the Bush Doctrine, September 20, 2001 (audio only).

2000

- December: George W. Bush wins the 2000 presidential election after the Supreme Court halts a highly contentious recount in Florida.

2001

- June: President Bush signed his 10-year tax cut into law; in 2000 he had promised to return the federal budget surplus through an across-the-board reduction in federal income taxes.
- September: 9-11 terrorists attacks redefine the conservative role in foreign policy.

2002

- Scott McConnell, Patrick Buchanan, and Taki Theodoracopulos found the paleoconservative magazine, The American Conservative.

2003

- November: The Partial-Birth Abortion Ban Act is enacted.

2004

- November: Conservatives mobilize to reelect President Bush; he defeats John F. Kerry.

2005

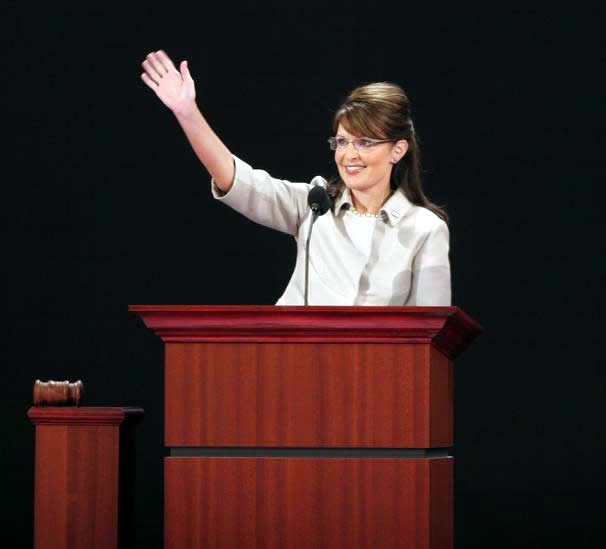
Sarah Palin addresses the 2008 Republican National Convention.

- Bush pushes for a private dimension to Social Security —allowing workers to invest a portion of their Social Security taxes in stocks and bonds—but it goes nowhere.

2006

- January: Samuel Alito, a staunch conservative nominated by George W. Bush, is confirmed as an Associate Justice of the United States Supreme Court on a party-line vote in the Senate.
- November: Democrats make major gains in off-year elections, attacking the unpopular war in Iraq and the bungling of Hurricane Katrina relief.

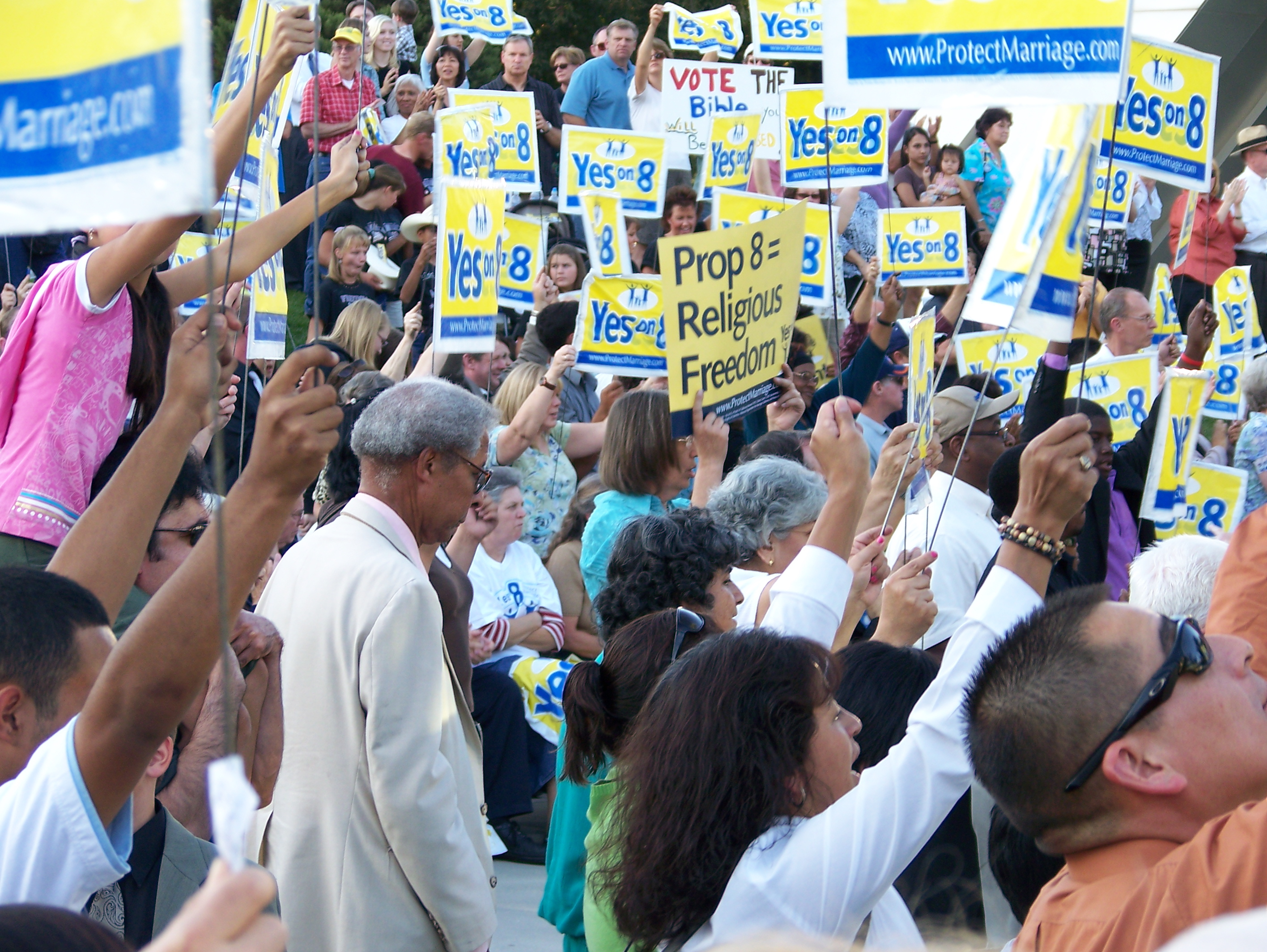
Yes on 8 rally in Fresno, California

2007

- May: Christian right leader and founder of the Moral Majority, Jerry Falwell dies in his office in Lynchburg, Virginia.
- Conservative talk show hosts mobilize fierce public opposition to the McCain–Kennedy immigration reform bill, which eventually fails.

2008

- August: Little-known Alaska Governor Sarah Palin becomes the first woman on a national GOP ticket as nominee for Vice President.
- November: Democrat Barack Obama defeated Republican John McCain by 53% to 46%. Barack Obama was elected and officially inaugurated as president of the United States of America on January 20, 2009. He was re-elected president in November 2012 and was sworn in for a second term on January 20, 2013. The national exit poll shows self-identified conservatives comprise 34% of the voters and support McCain 78% to 20%. Liberals comprise 22% of the voters and support Obama 89% to 10%. Moderates comprise 44% of the voters and support Obama 60% to 39%.

Taxpayer March on Washington

- November: Proposition 8 which prescribes that marriage is between a man and a woman in California is passed with 52.2% of the vote.

2009

- The Tea Party movement is founded, in part emerging from libertarian conservative Ron Paul's 2008 campaign for the Republican nomination. The loosely organized conservative movement demands rigorous adherence to the Constitution, lower taxes, lower deficits, restrictions on illegal immigrants, and opposes Obama's health care proposals.
- Activists Hannah Giles and James O'Keefe make sting videos compromising the integrity of Association of Community Organizations for Reform Now (ACORN); ACORN soon dissolves.

=== 2010s ===
Numerous historians after 1990 re-examined the role of conservatism in recent American history, according it much greater importance than before. One school of thought rejects the older consensus that liberalism was the dominant ethos. Instead it argues conservatism dominated American politics since the 1920s, with the brief exceptions of the New Deal era (1933–36) and the Great Society (1963–66). However Historian Julian Zelizer argues that "liberalism survived the rise of conservatism."

2010

- Supreme Court decision in Citizens United v. FEC holds that the free speech clause of the First Amendment applies to political speech during elections, making spending limits unconstitutional in certain cases. The Court majority upheld the libertarian approach to free speech, while the dissenters took an egalitarian approach.

2010 House election results: dark blue denotes Democratic gain, blue denotes Democratic hold, dark red denotes Republican gain and red denotes Republican hold.

- November: in the largest GOP gain since 1938, 2010 became one of the most important elections in conservative history as GOP candidates make major gains in midterm elections across the country for Congress, governorships and state legislatures. Conservative voters (self-identified) comprise 42% of the voters and support GOP House candidates 84% to 13%. Liberals comprise 20% of the voters and support Democrats 90% to 8%. Moderates comprise 38% of the voters and support the GOP 55% to 42%. Republicans gain 63 seats in the House of Representatives and six seats in the U.S. Senate.

2012

- A central concern for conservatives in the 2012 GOP primaries was whether front-runner Mitt Romney is conservative enough. Numerous other challengers on the right rose and fell, notably Herman Cain, Rick Santorum, Newt Gingrich, Rick Perry, and Michele Bachmann. Romney moved sharply to the right and chose deficit hawk Representative Paul Ryan of Wisconsin as his running mate. Obama, however, successfully mobilized his base and won reelection, as Democrats made small gains in the House and Senate.

2014

- November: Republicans win majorities in both houses of Congress, and flip several governorships in the 2014 midterm elections.

2016

- November: Republicans continue to hold both houses of Congress as well as take the White House. Donald Trump is elected as President of the United States in the 2016 presidential election.

2017

- April: Neil Gorsuch, nominated by Donald Trump, is confirmed as associate justice to the Supreme Court.

2018

- October: Brett Kavanaugh, nominated by Donald Trump, is confirmed as associate justice to the Supreme Court.
- November: Democrats take control of the House in the midterm elections, while Republicans retain control of the Senate.

=== 2020s ===
2020

- October: Amy Coney Barrett, nominated by Donald Trump, is confirmed as associate justice to the Supreme Court.
- November: Joe Biden defeats Donald Trump in the 2020 presidential election, and Democrats retain control of the house and take control of the Senate.

2021

- January: The January 6 attack on the Capital occurs, which saw right-wing extremists storm the capital building in support of Donald Trump.

2022

- November: Republicans take control of the House in the midterm elections, while Democrats retain control of the Senate.

2024

- November: Donald Trump is re-elected President of the United States in the 2024 presidential election, and Republicans retain control of the house and take control of the Senate.

2025

- September: Right-wing activist Charlie Kirk is assassinated.

== See also ==
- Bibliography of conservatism in the United States

Timelines

- Timeline of Black conservatism in the United States
- Timeline of the Cold War
- Timeline of libertarian thinkers
- Timeline of United States history

== Bibliography ==
- Allitt, Patrick. The Conservatives: Ideas and Personalities Throughout American History (2009)
- Carey, George (2008). "Conservatism". In Hamowy, Ronald (ed.). The Encyclopedia of Libertarianism. Thousand Oaks, CA: Sage; Cato Institute. pp. 93–95. doi:10.4135/9781412965811.n61. ISBN 978-1412965804. LCCN 2008009151. OCLC 750831024.
- Carlisle, Rodney P. (2005). Encyclopedia of Politics: The Left and the Right. Sage Publications. ISBN 978-1452265315.
- Congressional Quarterly. Congress and the Nation: 1945–1964 (1965); Congress and the Nation: 1965–1968 (1969); with new volumes every four years, 1973, 1977... etc. Highly detailed nonpartisan timelines of political activity in Washington.
- Crane, Michael (2004). The Political Junkie Handbook. SP Books. ISBN 978-1561718917. elaborate details on hundreds of political groups and media across the spectrum
- Critchlow, Donald T. The Conservative Ascendancy: How the Right Made Political History (2nd ed. 2011)
- Cunningham, Sean P. Cowboy Conservatism: Texas and the Rise of the Modern Right (2010).
- Filler, Louis. Dictionary of American Conservatism (Philosophical Library, 1987)
- Frohnen, Bruce et al. eds. American Conservatism: An Encyclopedia (2006); the most detailed reference
- Nash, George H. The Conservative Intellectual Movement in America Since 1945 (1976)
- Sandbrook, Dominic. Mad as Hell: The Crisis of the 1970s and the Rise of the Populist Right (Anchor, 2012) 544 pp; popular history
- Schneider, Gregory. The Conservative Century: From Reaction to Revolution (2009)
- Story, Ronald; Bruce Laurie (2007). Rise of Conservatism in America, 1945–2000: A Brief History with Documents. Bedford/St. Martin's.

Videos

- Allitt, Patrick N. (2009). The Conservative Tradition (CD). The Teaching Co. ISBN 978-1598035483.
