= New Right =

Form of right-wing politics that emerged in the 1960s

New Right is a label used to refer to various right-wing political groups, policies, ideologies, and viewpoints that emerged in different countries at different points in time. The term New Right has also been used to describe the emergence of certain European parties after the dissolution of the Soviet Union.

Within the US, the term was used to describe a more combative, anti-egalitarian, and uninhibited right following the 1964 presidential campaign of Barry Goldwater. Although this American brand of New Right had little in common with the "European New Right," both used the expression "conservative revolution" (but only the European New Right used it in a way similar to that of the conservative revolutionary Moeller van den Bruck).

The Second New Right campaigned against abortion, LGBT civil rights, the Equal Rights Amendment (ERA), the Panama Canal Treaty, affirmative action, and most forms of taxation.

== History ==
The term New Right originally appeared during the 1964 presidential campaign of Barry Goldwater to designate the emergence, in response to American-style liberalism (that is, social liberalism), of a more combative, anti-egalitarian, and uninhibited right. Popularized by Richard Viguerie, the term was later used to describe a broader global movement: proponents of the night-watchman state, who were also socially conservative, such as Ronald Reagan, Margaret Thatcher, Turgut Özal, or Augusto Pinochet. However, as Jean-Yves Camus and Nicolas Lebourg note, this leaning had only a few aspects in common with the "European New Right" that had been emerging since the 1960s, which was more inspired by the conservative revolutionary Moeller van den Bruck than by the classical liberal Adam Smith. Anarcho-capitalism, a form of libertarianism that advocates replacing all state institutions with private ones, is usually seen as part of the New Right.

== New Right by country ==
=== Australia ===
In Australia, the New Right refers to a late 1970s/1980s onward movement both within and outside of the Liberal/National Coalition which advocates economically liberal and increasingly socially conservative policies (as opposed to the old right which advocated for economically conservative policies and "small-l liberals" with more socially liberal views). In contrast to the United Kingdom and United States, but similar to neighbouring New Zealand, the 1980s saw the Australian Labor Party pursue Third Way economic reforms, which bore some familiarity to New Right ideology. The establishment of the Howard government in 1996 ended the 13-year rule of the Hawke-Keating Labor governments. Howard increased economic reforms, including wholesale labor market deregulation (e.g., WorkChoices), the introduction of a Goods and Services Tax (GST), the privatisation of the telecommunications monopoly Telstra, and sweeping welfare reform including "work for the dole". The H. R. Nicholls Society, a think tank which advocates full workplace deregulation, contains some Liberal MPs as members and is seen to be of the New Right.

Economic liberalism is also called economic rationalism in Australia. The term economic rationalism was first used by Labor's Gough Whitlam to describe a market-oriented form of social democracy, but its meaning subsequently evolved. It is a philosophy which tends to advocate a free market economy, increased deregulation, privatisation, lower direct taxation and higher indirect taxation, and a reduction of the size of the welfare state. The politicians favouring the New Right were referred to as dries, while those advocating continuation of the economic policies of the post-war consensus, typically Keynesian economics, or who were more socially liberal, were called wets (the term wets was similarly used in Britain to refer to those Conservatives who opposed Thatcherite economic policies, but dries in this context was much rarer in British usage).

=== Brazil ===
The New Right in Brazil has grown sharply in recent years within population, intelligentsia, and academia. That is mainly due to a generalized discontent with the previous left-wing government and its policies.

This new movement distinguishes itself from what is known in Brazil as old right, which was ideologically associated to the Brazilian military government, União Democrática Nacional (National Democratic Union), and Integralism. It is identified by positive views regarding democracy, personal freedom, free-market capitalism, reduction of bureaucracy, privatization of state-run companies, tax cuts, parliamentary, political reform. It rejects "cultural Marxism", modern socialism and populism.

There have been two major phenomena relating to the rise of the new Brazilian right: the Free Brazil Movement, which has managed to bring together millions of people on demonstrations against the government in March 2015; and the creation of the New Party (Partido Novo) and Libertários, the first liberal party since the First Brazilian Republic.

Some Brazilian new-right thinkers are Kim Kataguiri and his movement Movimento Brasil Livre (Free Brazil Movement), Roberto Campos, Wilson Martins, Olavo de Carvalho, Luiz Felipe Pondé, Paulo Francis, José Guilherme Merquior, Bruno Tolentino, and Miguel Reale.

As a result of this movement, in the 2018 Brazilian election, Jair Messias Bolsonaro was elected President of Brazil with 55% of the votes; his Minister of Finance, Paulo Guedes, graduated from the University of Chicago, famous for its economically liberal school of economics.

=== Chile ===
The term New Right (Spanish: Nueva derecha) has come into mainstream political discourse since the election of Sebastián Piñera in 2010, when interior minister Rodrigo Hinzpeter used it to describe his government. Hinzpeter's introduction of the term caused a buzz among newspapers, politicians and analysts. According to a column published in The Clinic, the New Right is different from the old dictatorial right of Augusto Pinochet, in the sense that it embraces democracy. It is also different from the religiously conservative Unión Demócrata Independiente party, in that it is more open to discussing issues like divorce. According to the same analysis, the New Right is becoming increasingly pragmatic, as shown by their decision to increase taxes following the 2010 Chilean earthquake.

=== France ===
In France, the New Right (or Nouvelle Droite) has been used as a term to describe a modern think-tank of French political philosophers and intellectuals led by Alain de Benoist. Another noted intellectual, who was once part of Alain de Benoist's GRECE, is Guillaume Faye. Although accused by some critics as being "far-right" in their beliefs, they themselves claim that their ideas transcend the traditional left–right divide and that the New Right actively encourages free debate. France also has one Identitarian New Right group (which is connected with Thule Seminar in Germany); that is Terre et Peuple of Pierre Vial, who was once an integral part and founding member of Alain de Benoist's GRECE.

=== Germany ===
In Germany, the Neue Rechte (literally, new right) consists of two parts: the Jungkonservative (literally, young conservatives), who search for followers in the civic part of the population; and, secondly, the "Nationalrevolutionäre" (national revolutionists), who are looking for followers in the ultra-right part of the German population and use the rhetoric of right-wing politicians such as Gregor and Otto Strasser. Another noted New Right group in Germany is Thule Seminar of Pierre Krebs.

=== Greece ===
Failos Kranidiotis, a Greek politician who had been expelled by New Democracy chairman Kyriakos Mitsotakis for expressing views similar to those of political rival Golden Dawn, founded the New Right party, based on national liberalism, in May 2016. His views diverged from those of former Prime Minister of Greece Konstantinos Mitsotakis, whose legacy expressed the most important principle of its recently elected leadership, including Adonis Georgiadis, who had been a member only since leaving far-right Popular Orthodox Rally in 2012.

=== Iran ===
In Iran, New Right and the term Modern Right (Persian: راست مدرن) are associated with the Executives of Construction Party, which has split from the Islamic Right (Persian: راست اسلامی); both Modern Right and Traditional Right (or "Principlists") are separated from Islamic Right, but Modern Right is part of the Reformists.

=== Israel ===
New Right is a right-wing political party in Israel, founded in 2018 and led by Ayelet Shaked and Naftali Bennett. The party advocates the preservation of a strong right wing in Israel, and is open to both secular and religious people.

=== Japan ===
The Japanese New Right, or Minzoku-ha, is a Japanese ethno-nationalist faction that emerged after postwar Japan. The Japanese New Right is known to be more anti-American (反米保守, lit. "anti-American conservative") than mainstream conservatives or Japanese nationalists. It originated among the student agitations of the 1960s and 1970s, many of whom were followers of Yukio Mishima. In postwar Japan, mainstream conservatives prioritized "anti-communism" (反共主義) over Japanese "ethnic nationalism" (民族主義) in the context of the Cold War; however, minzoku-ha was critical of the pro-Americanism of mainstream conservatives. Minzoku-ha grew up influenced by Yukio Mishima's nationalism and the Japanese New Left.

=== Netherlands ===
The New Right (NR) was the name of a far-right/nationalist political party in the Netherlands from 2003 to 2007. The Party for Freedom (PVV), founded in 2005 and led by Geert Wilders, also is a New Right movement. Since March 2017, Forum for Democracy is another New Right party in the Dutch parliament.

=== New Zealand ===
In New Zealand, as in Australia, it was the Labour Party that initially adopted New Right economic policies. Rogernomics involved monetarist approaches to controlling inflation, corporatisation of government departments, and the removal of tariffs and subsidies, while the party also pursued social liberal stances such as decriminalisation of male homosexuality, pay equity for women and adopting a nuclear-free policy. This meant temporary realignment within New Zealand politics, as New Right middle-class voters voted Labour at the 1987 New Zealand general election in approval of its economic policies. At first, Labour corporatised many former government departments and state assets, then emulated the Conservative Thatcher administration and privatised them altogether during Labour's second term of office. However, recession and privatisation together led to increasing strains within the Labour Party, which led to schism, and the exit of Jim Anderton and his NewLabour Party, which later formed part of the Alliance Party with the Greens and other opponents of New Right economics.

However, dissent and schism were not to be limited to the Labour Party and Alliance Party alone. During the Labour Party's second term in office, the Opposition New Zealand National Party (popularly known as National) selected Ruth Richardson as Opposition finance spokesperson, and when National won the 1990 general election, Richardson became Minister of Finance, while Jenny Shipley became Minister of Social Welfare. Richardson introduced deunionisation legislation, known as the Employment Contracts Act, in 1991, while Shipley presided over social welfare benefit cuts, designed to reduce welfare dependency – both core New Right policy initiatives.

In the early 1990s, maverick National Party MP Winston Peters also came to oppose New Right economic policies and led his elderly voting bloc out of the National Party. As a result, his New Zealand First anti-monetarist party has been a partner in coalition governments led by both National (1996–98) and Labour (2005–08 and 2017–20). Due to the introduction of the MMP electoral system, a New Right "Association of Consumers and Taxpayers" party, known as ACT New Zealand, was formed by ex-Labour New Right–aligned Cabinet Ministers like Richard Prebble and ex-National MPs including Derek Quigley among others, and maintained existing New Right policy initiatives such as the Employment Contracts Act, while also introducing U.S.-style welfare reform. ACT New Zealand aspired to become National's centre-right coalition partner but has been hampered by lack of party unity and populist leadership that often-lacked strategic direction.

As for Labour and National themselves, their fortunes have been mixed. Labour was out of office for most of the nineties, only regaining power when Helen Clark led it to victory and a Labour/Alliance coalition and centre-left government (1999–2002). However, the Alliance disintegrated in 2002. National was defeated in 1999 due to the absence of a suitable stable coalition partner, given New Zealand First's partial disintegration after Winston Peters abandoned the prior National-led coalition. When Bill English became leader of National in 2001, it was thought that he might lead the party away from its prior hardline New Right economic and social policies, but his indecisiveness and lack of firm policy direction led to ACT New Zealand gaining the New Right middle-class voting basis in 2002. When Don Brash became leader, New Right middle-class voters returned to National's fold, causing National's revival in fortunes at the 2005 New Zealand general election. However, at the same time, ACT New Zealand strongly criticised it for deviating from its former New Right economic policy perspectives, and at the same election, National did little to enable ACT's survival. Don Brash resigned as National party leader, being replaced by John Key, who was a more moderate National MP.

As for the centre-left, Helen Clark and her Labour-led coalition were criticised by ex-Alliance members and non-government organisations for their alleged lack of attention to centre-left social policies, while trade union membership recovered due to Labour's repeal of the Employment Contracts Act 1991 and labour market deregulation and the deunionisation that had accompanied it in the nineties. It is plausible that Clark and her Cabinet were influenced by Tony Blair and his British Labour Government, which pursued a similar balancing act between social and fiscal responsibility while in government.

=== Poland ===
In Poland, a conservative libertarian and eurosceptic political party Congress of the New Right (New Right) was founded on 25 March 2011 from former political parties Freedom and Lawfulness (WiP) and Real Politics Union (UPR) by Janusz Korwin-Mikke. It is backed up by various voters, usually between 1% and 7%, it received the most support in its history in the 2011 parliamentary and the 2014 European parliamentary elections. Congress of the New Right has also supported Grzegorz Braun in the 2025 presidential election, where he received 6,34% of the vote.

New Right was succeeded by the KORWiN party (later renamed to the New Hope party) in 2015, where the new party had received 4,76% of the vote in the parliamentary election and Korwin, its backed candidate, received 3,26% of the vote in the presidential election. The New Hope party continued the New Right party's conservative libertarian and eurosceptic views, while also adding right-wing populist and conservative liberal views. In 2022, Sławomir Mentzen succeeded Korwin as the leader of the party and had taken measures to distance himself from Korwin, eventually leading to Korwin's removal from the New Hope in 2023. This also distanced the party from the New Right movement.

In 2024, after his removal from New Hope Korwin founded a new party, which he has also called KORWiN. He stated that the party's postulates will be the same as the old KORWiN/New Hope's party postulates, before Mentzen's takeover. In 2025 Korwin's new party joined Braun's political extremist and anti-establishment coalition, the Broad Fire Extinguisher Front. Originally, Korwin and Braun had planned to create a new party together, called the Cobra (Polish: Kobra), but they decided on a broad coalition instead.

=== South Korea ===
In South Korea, the South Korean New Right movement is a Korean attempt at ultraconservative politics. The Lee Myung-bak government led by President Lee Myung-bak and the conservative Grand National Party is noted for being a benefactor of the domestic New Right movement.

=== United Kingdom ===
In the United Kingdom, the term New Right more specifically refers to a strand of Conservatism that Margaret Thatcher and Ronald Reagan influenced. Thatcher's style of New Right ideology, known as Thatcherism, was heavily influenced by the work of Friedrich Hayek (in particular the book The Road to Serfdom). They were ideologically committed to economic liberalism as well as being socially conservative.

=== United States ===
In the United States, New Right refers to two historically distinct conservative political movements. These American New Rights are distinct from and opposed to the more moderate tradition of the so-called Rockefeller Republicans. The New Right also differs from the Old Right (1933–55) on issues concerning foreign policy with neoconservatives being opposed to the non-interventionism of the Old Right.

==== First New Right ====
The first New Right (1955–68) was centered on the right-wing libertarians, traditionalists, and anti-communists at William F. Buckley's National Reviewfounded around 1955. Sociologists and journalists had used new right since the 1950s; it was first used as self-identification in 1962 by the student activist group Young Americans for Freedom.

The first New Right embraced what it called "fusionism" (an ostensible synthesis of classical liberal economics, traditional social values, and anti-communism) and coalesced in the years preceding the 1964 presidential campaign of Barry Goldwater. The Goldwater campaign, which failed to defeat incumbent President Lyndon B. Johnson, hastened the formation of a new political movement.

First New Right figures:

- William F. Buckley Jr., editor of National Review
- James Burnham, anti-communist political theorist
- M. Stanton Evans, journalist and author of Young Americans for Freedom's Sharon Statement
- Barry Goldwater, U.S. Senator from Arizona and Republican U.S. presidential candidate
- Frank Meyer, anti-communist libertarian and creator of the "fusionist" political theory

==== Second New Right ====
The second New Right (1968 to present) was formed in the wake of the Nixon campaign and had a more populist tone than the first New Right. The second New Right tended to focus on wedge issues (such as abortion) and was often linked with the Religious Right.

The mobilization of religious/social conservatives into the Second New Right took part in phases, rather than at once. Specifically, some historians note three specific phases by activist Paul Weyrich. The first phase was Weyrich's intitial attempts to mobilize conservatives through moral issues such as opposition to the ending of school prayer (1962), pornography (1969), the Equal Rights Amendment (1972), and abortion (1973). Weyrich himself claimed that these attempts were unsuccessful. In 1975, conservatives responded to the IRS notifying Bob Jones University that it intended to revoke its tax-exempt status due to racial segregation policies. Paul Weyrich noticed the conservative response, and began the second phase of mobilization by using race issues as a wedge. Once religious conservatives had joined the Republican bloc, Weyrich began the third phase by pivoting back to social-moral issues, such as abortion in the 1978 midterm elections. By 1980, the alignment of religious conservatives into the Republican party had settled.

1972 marked a key year for the entrance of social conservatism into presidential politics, when the Nixon campaign informally used the phrase "acid, amnesty, and abortion" as an attack against their Democrat opponent. In 1976, the phrase "family values" was used in the GOP national platform. Later in 1980, social conservatism was confirmed as a pillar of the then Reagan led GOP as Reagan famously quoted the GOP as standing on three pillars. The three pillars referred to Gipper's stool, consisting of fiscal, social, and foreign policy conservatism.

The second New Right formed a policy approach and electoral apparatus that brought Ronald Reagan into the White House in the 1980 presidential election. The New Right was organized in the American Enterprise Institute and The Heritage Foundation to counter the so-called "liberal establishment", which they viewed as a contributor to corruption and mismanagement of the federal government. In elite think tanks and local community organizations alike, new policies, marketing strategies, and electoral strategies were crafted over the succeeding decades to promote strongly conservative policies. The second New Right objected to a perceived decline in morality, including increased drug use, more public and open displays of sexuality, rising crime rates, race riots and unrest from civil rights protesters, and Vietnam War protesters.

Second New Right figures:

- James Dobson, founder of Focus on the Family
- Pat Buchanan, political commentator, founder of The American Conservative, and candidate in the 1992 Republican Party presidential primaries
- Terry Dolan, founder of the National Conservative Political Action Committee
- Jerry Falwell, Southern Baptist minister, founder of Liberty University and Moral Majority
- Newt Gingrich, former Congressman, Speaker of the House, candidate for the Presidency of the United States, author
- Robert Grant, Christian right activist and founder of Christian Voice
- Rush Limbaugh, nationally syndicated talk radio and former cable news host, author
- Milton Friedman, neoclassical economist of the Chicago school of economics, recipient of the 1976 Nobel Memorial Prize in Economic Sciences
- Howard Phillips, founder of The Conservative Caucus
- Ronald Reagan, 40th president of the United States, actor, 33rd governor of California, union leader
- Phyllis Schlafly, anti-feminist activist and founder of the Eagle Forum
- Richard Viguerie, direct mail activist
- Paul Weyrich, founder of The Heritage Foundation and the Free Congress Research and Education Foundation

==== Third New Right ====
The Third New Right is a lesser-known and loosely coordinated group that began to emerge during the Trump presidency. The group consists of members who disassociate themselves from mainstream conservatism and with the extremist white identitarian alt-right, while still accepting some moderate forms of white identitarian politics. They may accept relatively non-violent movements such as "groypers" while excluding violent groups like "wignats".

The group consists of factions such as National Conservatives, postliberals, and the Nietzschean right. Other characterizations include factions such as "the Claremonters", Catholic Integralists and tech authoritarian-libertarians, among others. The group can be characterized as skeptical of mainstream conservatism for being too liberal. Yoram Hazony was quoted at a National Conservative conference saying "We declare independence from neoliberalism, from libertarianism, from what they call classical liberalism, you can give it any name you want, but that set of ideas that sees the atomic individual, the free and equal individual [as highly important in politics]." Some analysts consider Trump to be only a prelude to the new right.

Third New Right figures:

- Ron DeSantis, 46th governor of Florida
- JD Vance, 50th Vice President of the United States
- Yoram Hazony, philosopher and chairman of the Edmund Burke Foundation
- Josh Hawley, United States senator from Missouri
- Patrick Deneen, political theorist and professor at the University of Notre Dame
- Sohrab Ahmari, author and co-founder of Compact Magazine
- Adrian Vermeule, legal scholar and professor of constitutional law at Harvard Law School
- Stephen Wolfe, author of The Case for Christian Nationalism
- Curtis Yarvin, aka Mencius Moldbug, blogger and founder of the Dark Enlightenment
- Costin Vlad Alamariu, aka Bronze Age Pervert, internet personality and author
- Carl Benjamin, aka Sargon of Akkad, internet personality
- Peter Thiel, venture capitalist, co-founder of PayPal, Palantir Technologies, and Founders Fund
- Balaji Srinivasan, entrepreneur and former CTO of Coinbase
- Marc Andreessen, venture capitalist, co-founder of Mosaic, Netscape, Andreessen Horowitz, Opsware, and Ning
- Ben Horowitz, entrepreneur and co-founder of Andreessen Horowitz
- Steve Sailer, columnist and blogger
- Steve Bannon, political strategist, pundit, former White House Chief Strategist
- Michael Anton, essayist, speechwriter, and Director of Policy Planning
- R. R. Reno, theologian, political philosopher, and editor of the First Things magazine
- Jonathan Keeperman, owner of Passage Publishing

== See also ==
- Neoconservatism
- Neo-nationalism
- New Left
- Old Right (United States)
- One-nation conservatism (UK)
- Paul Joseph Watson
