= Ed McAteer =

American businessman and Baptist (1926–2004)

Edward Eugene McAteer, known as Ed McAteer (July 29, 1926 – October 6, 2004) was an American businessman and founder of the Religious Roundtable.

== Biography ==
McAteer was born in Memphis, Tennessee, in 1926; he stated he grew up impoverished and an orphan during the Great Depression. He later studied at, though did not graduate from, Memphis State University and Southern Law School. During World War II, McAteer served in the United States Navy. McAteer credited his tough upbringing for his Christian faith and pro-free-enterprise views.

He married Faye Carter. The couple had two sons, Edward Jr. and Timothy McAteer.

McAteer was religiously active, serving as interim pastor at Southern Baptist churches, organizing evangelical rallies, and serving as board member for multiple large Christian organizations, including The Gideons International and Wycliffe Bible Translators.

McAteer worked for Colgate-Palmolive for 28 years. In 1976, he left his job as district sales manager to work full-time for Christian Freedom Foundation (CFF), an organization founded by J. Howard Pew and Howard Kershner in 1950 with the goal of influencing clergy politically. By the 1970s, it focused on recruiting workers and training leaders to encourage Christians—particularly evangelicals—to vote for members of Congress who explicitly share their views on conservative economics. He became national field director of the struggling CFF, which had recently been taken over as a non-profit foundation to receive donations for Bill Bright and John Conlan's Third Century Publishers, which promoted a connection between evangelical Christianity and conservative politics. In addition, McAteer was also national field director of The Conservative Caucus. Noting the lower rate of political participation among evangelicals at the time, McAteer saw a lack of understanding of the political process and a need to mobilize conservative Christian voters—particularly at a time of growing debate on social issues such as gay rights and abortion. McAteer founded the Religious Roundtable, a conservative religious coalition patterned after Business Roundtable, in 1979. Similar to a trade association, the organization focused on gathering and directing New Right leaders, including clergy; it sought to use leaders "willing to fight in the political arena for pro-God, pro-family, pro-America causes". He saw himself as fighting against the moral decay of society and secular humanism.

The Religious Roundtable arranged seminars featuring speakers such as Jesse Helms, Howard Phillips, and Paul Weyrich who spoke to clergy on political mobilization of their congregations; the organization also held voter registration drives at churches. In 1980, the organization held its National Affairs Briefing in Dallas, Texas; invitations were mailed to 160,000 clergy. Then presidential candidate Ronald Reagan was the only major candidate in attendance. Reagan stated, "I know you can't endorse me. But…I want you to know that I endorse you." The New York Times has called McAteer's Religious Roundtable "instrumental in Ronald Regan's election to the presidency in 1980, forging a bond between the Republican Party and the religious right that endures to this day." Along with organizations like Jerry Falwell's Moral Majority and Robert Grant's Christian Voice, McAteer's Religious Roundtable was one of the leading national groups comprising the New Christian right of the 1980s.

In 1984, McAteer ran for United States Senate, initially as a Republican but later as an independent, to fill Republican Howard Baker's seat. McAteer lost to Democrat Al Gore.

McAteer died of cancer at 78 years of age.
