= Coalition for Religious Freedom =

The Coalition for Religious Freedom is a religious right organization founded by Tim LaHaye and Robert Grant to lobby against government regulation of religion. In the 1980s the organization concentrated its efforts on defending the Unification Church.

== See also ==
- International Coalition for Religious Freedom
- Christian right
- Christian Voice
- American Freedom Coalition
