= Anthony R. Dolan =

American journalist (1948–2025)

Tony Dolan
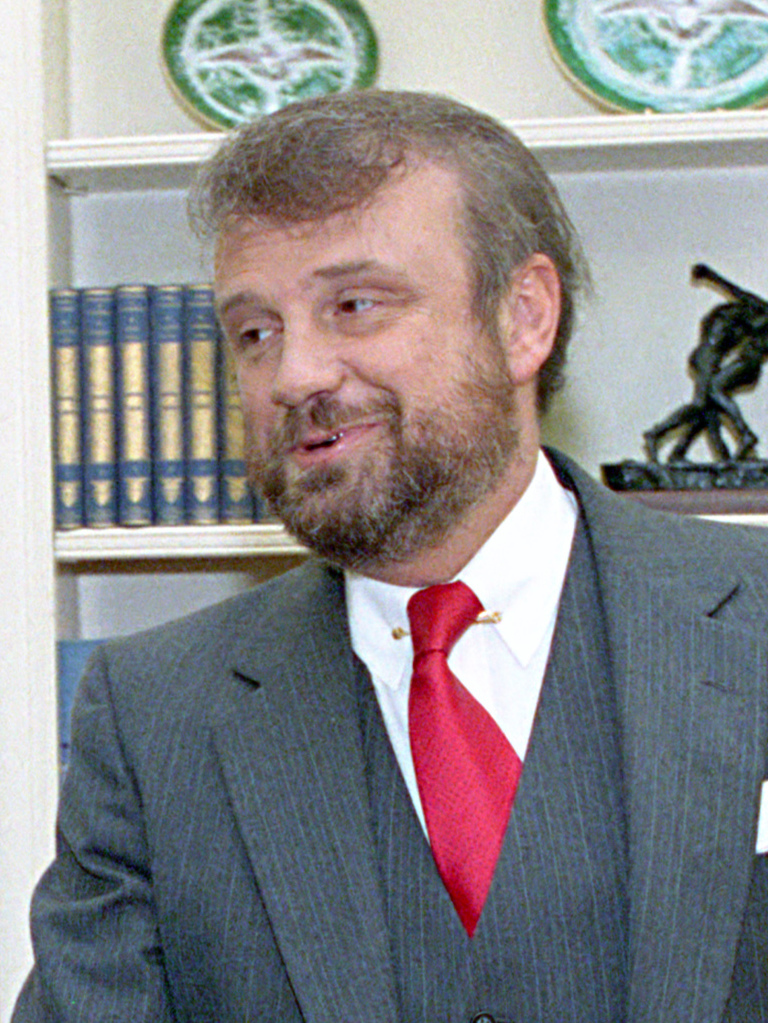
- Dolan in 1989

White House Chief Speechwriter
- In office November 17, 1981 – January 20, 1989; Acting: May 3, 1981 – November 17, 1981
- President: Ronald Reagan
- Preceded by: Ken Khachigian
- Succeeded by: Chriss Winston (Director of Speechwriting)

Personal details
- Born: July 7, 1948 Norwalk, Connecticut, U.S.
- Died: March 10, 2025 (aged 76) Alexandria, Virginia, U.S.
- Party: Republican
- Relatives: Terry Dolan (brother)
- Education: Yale University (BA)

Anthony Rossi Dolan (July 7, 1948 – March 10, 2025) was an American journalist and speechwriter who wrote for President Ronald Reagan from March 1981 until the end of Reagan's second term in 1989. Dolan served as the director of special research and Issues and in the Office of Research and Policy at the Headquarters of the Reagan-Bush Committee. He continued to advise Republican candidates and presidential administrations throughout the remainder of his life.

== Background ==
Anthony Rossi Dolan was born in Norwalk, Connecticut, on July 7, 1948, one of three children born to a Catholic family. He was active in Republican politics from an early age. Dolan was educated at Fairfield College Preparatory School and Yale University. He also served in the United States Army.

== Career ==
After a few years in politics, including as a press secretary for James L. Buckley during the 1970 United States Senate election in New York, Dolan returned to Connecticut and went into journalism, writing for The Stamford Advocate. At age 29, he won the 1978 Pulitzer Prize for Local Investigative Specialized Reporting for a series of articles on municipal corruption published in The Advocate. He left the paper upon joining the Reagan administration, where he remained for nearly the entirety of the Reagan presidency. As speechwriter, he wrote the speeches "Ash Heap of History" (1982) and "Evil Empire" (1983).

During the presidency of President George W. Bush, Dolan served as Senior Advisor in the office of Secretary of State (December 2000 to July 2001) and Special Advisor in the Office of the Secretary of Defense (August 2001 to December 2007). He remained active in politics until the end of his life, and was named to advise the United States Domestic Policy Council during the second presidency of Donald Trump in January 2025.

Under the name Tony Dolan he had been, for a time, a conservative folk-singer who put out the album "Cry, The Beloved Country" and appeared on The Merv Griffin Show.

== Personal life and death ==
Dolan was a devout Catholic. His late brother Terry Dolan was co-founder and chairman of the National Conservative Political Action Committee (NCPAC).

Dolan died at Inova Alexandria Hospital in Alexandria, Virginia, on March 10, 2025, at the age of 76.
