= Haven University =

Private Christian university in California

Coordinates: 33.9277°N 117.9599°W

- Type: Private university
- Established: 1969
- Accreditation: TRACS
- Religious affiliation: Nondenominational Christianity
- President: Joshua Smith
- Location: Garden Grove, California, United States
- Website: haven.edu

Haven University is a private Christian university in Garden Grove, California, United States.

== History ==
The California Graduate School of Theology was founded and chartered in California in 1969 by William S. McBirnie, an ordained Southern Baptist pastor, author, and educator. Joining with McBirnie in this effort were psychologist and syndicated columnist and prominent Methodist layman George Crane and Robert Grant. It opened its doors one year later on the campus of the United Community Church in Glendale. Classroom facilities and a library were built on the site. Past presidents have included W. S. McBirnie, Holland London, Donald Ellis, and Lawrence Wilkes. Since its inception over 6,000 students have become alumni.

Under the presidency of Lawrence Wilkes, the school relocated to the campus of the Crystal Cathedral in Garden Grove before moving to its present location, also in Garden Grove, California. The university also has a teaching location in Las Vegas, Nevada, two in Los Angeles County and three in Thailand.

The current president is Joshua Smith.

== Academics ==
In 2025, the California Bureau for Private Postsecondary Education (BPPE) reapproved the school to offer degrees ranging from the Bachelor of Arts/Theology, Bachelor of Science in Business Administration Master of Arts (MA), Master of Divinity (M.Div.), Master of Business Administration (M.B.A), Doctor of Ministry (D.Min.). The university also offers certificate programs in ESL, Christian Legal Studies and Organizational Leadership.

Haven University (CGSOT) is accredited by the Transnational Association of Christian Colleges and Schools (TRACS) to grant bachelors, masters, and doctoral degrees. In 2020, the undergraduate school took the name Haven University, with the graduate theology division retaining the name California Graduate School of Theology.
