= Ash heap of history =

English phrase

The phrase "ash heap of history", (Note: Alternatively: "dustbin of history", "dust heap of history", "trash heap of history", "garbage heap of history", and "ashcan of history".) is a derogatory metaphorical reference to oblivion of things or persons no longer relevant.

In 1887 the English essayist Augustine Birrell (1850–1933) coined the term in his series of essays, Obiter Dicta: "that great dust heap called 'history.'"

A notable usage was that of the Russian Bolshevik Leon Trotsky referring to the Mensheviks: "Go where you belong from now on – into the dustbin of history!" as the Menshevik faction walked out of the All-Russian Congress of Soviets on 25 October 1917 in Petrograd. (Note: Trotsky actually said "na svalku istorii" (на свалку истории), "to the dump of history".)

In a speech to the British House of Commons, on 8 June 1982, U.S. President Ronald Reagan later responded that "freedom and democracy will leave Marxism and Leninism on the ash heap of history". The speech was written by Reagan's chief speechwriter, Anthony Dolan, who stated that they had deliberately echoed Trotsky's statement "to throw it back in the communists' faces."

After the midterm election in USA 2026, republican politician Stephen Miller praised president Donald Trump for having “saved the Republican party from the ash heap of history and has made it stronger, more popular and more resilient than ever before”.

== See also ==
- Memory hole
- We will bury you
