= Moral Majority =

American right-wing Christian political organization

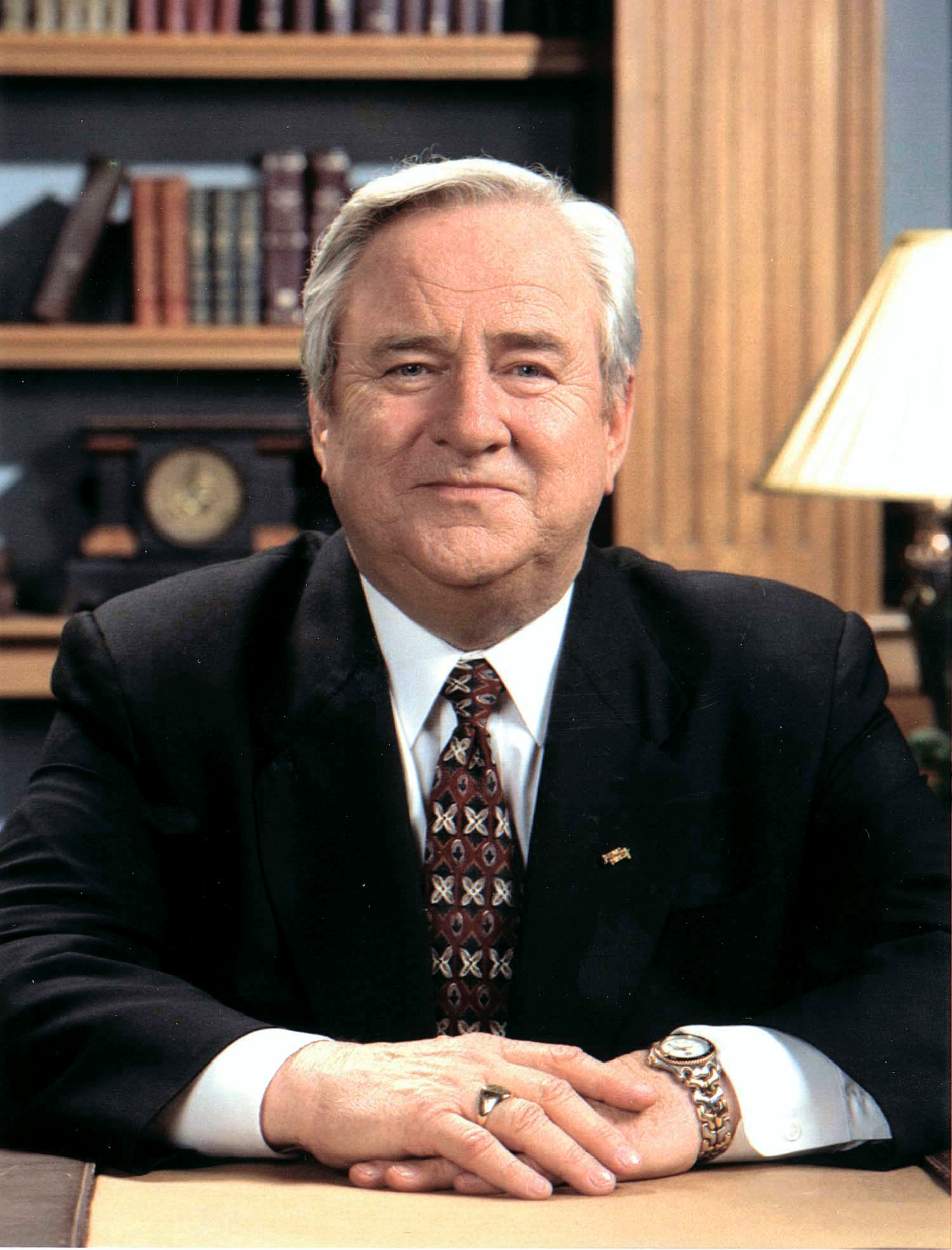
Jerry Falwell Sr., whose founding of the Moral Majority was a key step in the formation of the New Christian Right

The Moral Majority was an American political organization and movement associated with the Christian right and the Republican Party in the United States. It was founded in 1979 by Baptist minister Jerry Falwell Sr. and Paul Weyrich, and dissolved in the late 1980s. It played a key role in the mobilization of conservative Christians as a political force and particularly in Republican presidential victories throughout the 1980s.

== History ==
=== Before establishment ===
In 1971 a federal court ruled in Green v. Connally that racially discriminatory private schools were not entitled to federal tax exemption. Falwell had founded Lynchburg Christian Academy in 1967; the Lynchburg News described it as "a private school for white students". The IRS revoked Bob Jones University's tax exemption in 1976 over its ban on interracial dating, and in August 1978 proposed treating private schools founded around the time of local desegregation as presumptively discriminatory. More than 100,000 letters of protest followed, and Congress barred the agency from implementing the rule.

Historian Randall Balmer has argued that this dispute, rather than the 1973 Roe v. Wade decision, was the catalyst for the rise of the Christian right. Balmer cites Paul Weyrich, who said that "what galvanized the Christian community was not abortion, school prayer, or the ERA", but rather "Jimmy Carter's intervention against the Christian schools, trying to deny them tax-exempt status on the basis of so-called de facto segregation". Balmer also notes that the policy had been ordered by President Richard Nixon in 1970, and that Bob Jones University lost its exemption a year and a day before Carter was inaugurated.

In 1976 Baptist minister Jerry Falwell Sr. embarked on a series of "I Love America" rallies across the country to raise awareness of social issues important to him. These rallies were an extension of Falwell's decision to go against the traditional Baptist principle of separating religion and politics, a change of heart Falwell says he had when he perceived what he described as the decay of the nation's morality. Through hosting these rallies, Falwell was able to gauge national support for a formal organization and also raise his profile as a leader. Having already been a part of a well-established network of ministers and ministries, within a few years Falwell was favorably positioned to launch the Moral Majority.

The impetus for the Moral Majority was the struggle for control of an American conservative Christian advocacy group known as Christian Voice during 1978. Robert Grant, Christian Voice's president, said in a news conference that the religious right was a "sham... controlled by three Catholics and a Jew." Following this, Paul Weyrich, Terry Dolan, Richard Viguerie (the Catholics) and Howard Phillips (the Jew) left Christian Voice.

During a 1979 meeting, they urged televangelist Jerry Falwell Sr. to found the Moral Majority (a phrase coined by Weyrich). This was the period when the New Christian Right arose. Joining Falwell in the Moral Majority was Ed McAteer, who the same year, founded the Religious Roundtable in Memphis, Tennessee. Falwell also brought in Tim LaHaye, leader of a clergy group opposed to gay rights and John Birch Society figure, as an organizer.

=== Establishment and organizational activity ===
Falwell and Weyrich founded the Moral Majority in June 1979. According to former Arkansas governor Mike Huckabee, who was Texas evangelist James Robison's communications director at the time, Robison's "Freedom Rally" at the Dallas Convention Center was the genesis of the Moral Majority.

The Moral Majority was predominately a Southern-oriented organization of the Christian Right, although its state chapters and political activity extended beyond the South. The number of state chapters grew quickly, with organizations in eighteen states by 1980. The variety of resources available to the Moral Majority at its founding facilitated this rapid expansion, and included Falwell's mailing list from his program, Old Time Gospel Hour. In addition, the Moral Majority took control of the Old Time Gospel Hour's publication, Journal Champion, which had been distributed to the show's donors. Through the 1980s, Falwell was the organization's best-known spokesperson. By 1982, Moral Majority surpassed Christian Voice in size and influence.

The Moral Majority's headquarters were in Lynchburg, Virginia, where Falwell was the presiding minister of the nation's largest independent Baptist church, Thomas Road Baptist Church. Virginia has been a seat of Christian Right politics, being the state where the Christian Coalition's first headquarters were established. Falwell was at the head of the Moral Majority and maintained an advisory board, constituting the organization's primary leadership. This leadership was drawn mostly from Falwell's fellow members of the Baptist Bible Fellowship. Falwell insisted the Moral Majority leadership also include Catholics and Jews, although not all members of the leadership approved of this inclusion.

The Moral Majority was an organization made up of conservative Christian political action committees which campaigned on issues its personnel believed were important to maintaining its Christian conception of moral law. They believed this represented the opinions of the majority of Americans (hence the movement's name). With a membership of millions, the Moral Majority became one of the largest conservative lobby groups in the United States and at its height, it claimed more than four million members and over two million donors. These members were spread among about twenty state organizations, of which Washington State's was the largest. The Moral Majority was incorporated into the Liberty Federation in 1985, remaining a distinct entity but falling under the Liberty Federation's larger jurisdiction. In 1987, Falwell retired as the formal head of the Moral Majority, and was succeeded by Jerry Nims, although he maintained an active and visible role within the organization. The same year, a major effort which Falwell made to bring scandal-ridden Jim Bakker's PTL ministries out of financial trouble proved unsuccessful.

=== Dissolution ===
By the end of Ronald Reagan's presidential administration, Christian Right organizations were generally in a phase of decline. After Reagan's two terms in office, donations were decreasing, because after eight years of Christian Right-supported leadership, the nation was no longer seen as in the same state of supposed moral peril as it was when Reagan first took office. The Moral Majority's financial base seriously eroded by the time it became part of the Liberty Federation; its financial difficulties ultimately were a major factor in the decision to disband the organization. Falwell offered an optimistic public opinion about the Moral Majority's dissolution. Disbanding the Moral Majority in 1989 in Las Vegas, Falwell declared, "Our goal has been achieved... The religious right is solidly in place and [...] religious conservatives in America are now in for the duration."

== Organizational goals and composition ==
The Moral Majority sought to mobilize conservative Americans to become politically active on issues they thought were important. A variety of tactics were used to garner support. These tactics included direct-mail campaigns, telephone hotlines, rallies, and religious television broadcasts. Although the Moral Majority operated for only a decade, it rapidly became a visible political force and was relatively effective in its mobilization goals. According to Robert Liebman and Robert Wuthnow, common explanations for this success include:

- The Moral Majority was founded with strong financial backing already in place.
- Its leaders frequently communicated with its constituents, enabling consistent messages to resonate throughout all levels.
- Its leaders generally had previous organizational and management experience.
- The general public was amenable to the issues the Moral Majority emphasized.

Scholar Carmen Celestini argues that the culture war issues, conspiratorialism, apocalypticism, and fear emphasized in the John Birch Society were key aspects in the successful mobilization of the Moral Majority, particularly through Tim LaHaye, a Moral Majority figure and John Birch Society member and speaker.

Some issues for which the Moral Majority campaigned included:

- Promotion of traditional family values
- Opposition to media outlets accused of promoting an anti-family agenda
- Opposition to the Equal Rights Amendment and Strategic Arms Limitation Talks
- Opposition to state recognition or acceptance of homosexual acts
- Prohibition of abortion, including in cases involving incest or rape
- Support for Christian prayers in schools
- Proselytising to Jews and other non-Christians for conversion to Christianity

=== Social agenda ===
The Moral Majority successfully campaigned to create an integrated social platform that appealed to most conservative Christians by packaging a variety of previously disparate issues under the banner of "traditional family values". The Moral Majority portrayed issues such as abortion, divorce, feminism, gay and lesbian rights, and the Equal Rights Amendment as attacks on the traditional concept and values of American families and tapped into a sense of societal moral decay that resonated with many evangelicals. They also campaigned for the inclusion of prayer in schools and tax incentives for married couples as protection for the traditional family structure. Under this pro-family agenda, they mobilized a large base of supporters with issue-centric dialogue that they proliferated in their network of preachers and mailings.

==== Gay rights issues ====
In particular, the anti-gay rhetoric that they publicized through fundraising letters and Christian broadcasting had higher contribution rates than other topics. While not explicitly anti-gay in their public platforms during the 1970s, their internal mobilization as "shared anti-gay sentiment aided in solidifying a collective set of grievances and ideologies, in establishing a collective identity of constituents, and in constructing a hostile enemy against which the conservative Christian activists were to fight". The Moral Majority refrained from directly speaking out against gays, feminists, and pro-abortion parties and instead used "pro-family" rhetoric to articulate their point. For example, instead of coming out directly against homosexuality and gay families, leaders of the Moral Majority defined a family as "two heterosexual parents", which appealed to many conservatives.

Later, as the organization gained more influence in the 1980s, their rhetoric became more explicit in their stance on gay rights as they characterized the movement as an attack on the American family. Jerry Falwell Sr. expressed that because gay people were rejected by most of society, they had no choice but to prey on the young and were therefore a threat to children and families. Various Moral Majority members also expressed more extreme opinions, such as Moral Majority commentator Charlie Judd, who argued that "There are absolutes in this world. Just as jumping off a building will kill a person, so will the spread of homosexuality bring about the demise of American culture as we know it".

== Organizational structure ==
The Moral Majority comprised four distinct organizations:

- Moral Majority Inc. – the organization's lobbying division, which addressed issues on local, state, and national levels.
- Moral Majority Foundation – the organization's educational component, through which the Moral Majority educated ministers and lay people on political issues and conducted voter registration drives.
- Moral Majority Legal Defense Fund – the organization's legal instrument, used primarily to challenge the American Civil Liberties Union and secular humanist issues in court.
- Moral Majority Political Action Committee – the organization's mechanism for supporting the candidacy of people whose political platforms reflected Moral Majority values.

The state chapters of the Moral Majority were financially independent from the national organization and relied on local resources to conduct their activities. Consequently, the national organization encouraged local chapters to cooperate with their policies but had little control over local chapters' activities. Political activity of the Moral Majority divided accordingly, with the national Moral Majority office usually focused on addressing multiple issues through Congress while local branches tended to work on a single issue within their respective states.

== Political involvement ==
The Moral Majority engaged in political activity in a variety of ways, including national media campaigns and grassroots organization aimed at supporting particular candidates in elections and using mail and phone calls to reach office-holders. The Moral Majority's initial political actions were aimed at supporting Jesse Helms' proposed legislation on school prayer. Before long, the Moral Majority became heavily invested in presidential elections and national politics; although at the state level branches of the Moral Majority continued to pursue specific issues at lower levels of government. As far as elections, state Moral Majority chapters tended to deliberately focus their efforts towards particular candidates. For example, state chapters participated in campaigns to oust liberal members of Congress during the 1980 election. Also, in 1981, the Moral Majority mobilized delegates to the Virginia Republican state nominating convention in order to support Guy Farley, an evangelical candidate for lieutenant governor.

Nationally, the Moral Majority encouraged electoral participation among its members and used registration drives to register church-goers to vote, with the logic that Moral Majority members would be likely to vote for Moral Majority-endorsed candidates, thus strengthening the organization's electoral efficacy and strengthening its endorsements. Leaders within the Moral Majority asked ministers give their congregants political direction, reminding congregants when to vote, whom to vote for, and why the Moral Majority held particular positions on issues. The Moral Majority, however, is probably best known for its involvement in presidential elections, specifically those of Ronald Reagan.

=== Presidential elections ===
The 1976 election of Jimmy Carter as President of the United States marked a milestone for evangelical Christians. For the first time, a self-professed evangelical Christian had been elected to the nation's highest office, bringing the national awareness of evangelical Christianity to a new level. Despite commonality in religious identification, however, evangelical Christians in general and eventually the newly formed Moral Majority in particular came to be disappointed with Carter's policies. Carter did not share the Moral Majority's political imperative to unify personal and political positions and would instead support the positions of his own party, the Democratic Party. In particular, Carter did not actively oppose his party's general pro-choice platform on abortion, nor did Carter work to bridge the church–state divide, both factors in the Moral Majority's decision to support Ronald Reagan's candidacy in 1980.

==== 1980 ====
The Moral Majority was a relatively early supporter of Reagan, endorsing him before the Republican convention. According to Jimmy Carter, "that autumn [1980] a group headed by Jerry Falwell purchased $10 million in commercials on southern radio and TV to brand me as a traitor to the South and no longer a Christian." Naturally, the Moral Majority continued working on behalf of Reagan after he gained the Republican nomination. Following the organization's lead, more than one-fifth of Moral Majority supporters that had supported Carter in 1976 voted for Reagan in 1980. After Reagan's victory, Falwell attributed Reagan's success directly to the Moral Majority and others registering and encouraging church-goers to vote who had never before been politically active. Empirical evidence suggests that Falwell's claim about the role of Christian Right organizations in Reagan's victory has some truth, though difficult to determine definitively.

Reagan sought input from the Moral Majority leadership during his campaign and appointed the Rev. Robert Billings, the Moral Majority's first executive director, to be a religious advisor to the campaign. Later, Reagan appointed Billings to a position in the Department of Education. This appointment was particularly significant for the Moral Majority, which had lobbied on education policy issues, especially those regarding private schools.

==== 1984 ====
The Moral Majority maintained their support for Reagan's 1984 reelection campaign and, alongside other Christian Right organizations, influenced the Republican platform for the election, shaping the party's campaign stances on school prayer and abortion. The nation's political climate, however, had changed since Reagan's first campaign. Although Reagan won reelection, the role of the Moral Majority in the victory had changed since 1980. A study of voters in the 1984 election showed that more anti-Moral Majority voters voted for Walter Mondale than pro-Moral Majority voters voted for Reagan, suggesting the Moral Majority may have actually had a negative effect on Reagan's campaign.

==== 1988 ====
1988 was the last presidential election for which the Moral Majority was an active organization. With Reagan having reached his two-term limit, the Republican nomination was open to a variety of primary contenders. The evangelical minister and televangelist Pat Robertson sought the Republican nomination and would have been, at first glance, a natural choice for the Moral Majority's support. Although Robertson's political platforms were extremely similar to the ones the Moral Majority supported, Falwell gave his organization's endorsement to contender George H. W. Bush instead. Falwell's decision highlighted the rivalry between Falwell and Robertson as televangelists but also revealed the deep-seated tension that still persisted between competing evangelical traditions – Falwell's fundamentalist tradition was at odds with Robertson's charismatic tradition.

== Challenges to the Moral Majority ==
By 1987–88, the views of the Moral Majority were challenged widely and the organization started to crumble. With its waning support, critics said "The Moral Majority is neither", meaning the organization was neither moral nor a majority. By 1988, there were serious cash flow problems and Falwell dismantled the organization in 1989.

=== Bob Jones ===
During its existence the Moral Majority experienced friction with other evangelical leaders and organizations as well as liberal leaders and organizations. For example, Bob Jones particularly sought to challenge the public position of the Moral Majority and was known to make public statements that the Moral Majority was an instrument of Satan, due to Falwell’s abandonment of strict separatism and willingness to collaborate with Catholics and Orthodox Jews. Such rivalries affected the Moral Majority's grassroots efforts. In South Carolina, the Moral Majority had no presence because Bob Jones University's religious network had already organized the state's independent Baptists. The tension between Falwell and Pat Robertson also affected the Moral Majority.

=== Norman Lear ===
On the ideologically opposed side, Norman Lear's liberal organization People for the American Way was formed with the specific intention of opposing the platforms of the Moral Majority and other Christian Right organizations.

== Moral Majority Coalition ==
In November 2004, Falwell revived the Moral Majority name for a new organization, the Moral Majority Coalition. The intent of the organization is to continue the "evangelical revolution" to help conservative politicians get elected. Referring to the Coalition as a "21st century resurrection of the Moral Majority," Falwell, a father of the modern "religious right" political movement, committed to leading the organization for four years. He died on May 15, 2007.

== Notable people within the movement ==
- Ed Dobson
- Jerry Falwell Sr. (founder)
- Robert Grant
- Jesse Helms
- D. James Kennedy
- Beverly LaHaye
- Tim LaHaye
- Trent Lott
- Jerry Prevo
- Penny Pullen
- Judith A. Reisman
- Pat Robertson
- James Robison
- Charles Stanley
- Cal Thomas
- Richard Viguerie
- George Wallace
- Paul Weyrich

== See also ==
- Save Our Children
- Seven Mountain Mandate
- The Eyes of Tammy Faye (2021 film)
