= National Conservative Political Action Committee =

US new right political action committee

The National Conservative Political Action Committee (NCPAC; pronounced "nick-pack"), based in Alexandria, Virginia, was a New Right political action committee in the United States that was a major contributor to the ascendancy of conservative Republicans in the early 1980s, including the election of Ronald Reagan as President, and that innovated the use of independent expenditures to circumvent campaign finance restrictions.

In 1979 Time magazine characterized NCPAC, the Conservative Caucus and the Committee for the Survival of a Free Congress (headed by Paul Weyrich) as the three most important ultraconservative organizations making up the New Right.

== History ==
=== Founding ===
NCPAC was founded in 1975 by conservative activists Terry Dolan, Charles Black and Roger Stone, with help from Richard Viguerie and Thomas F. Ellis. The group got its start through direct mail solicitations. "The shriller you are, the better it is to raise money," explained co-founder Terry Dolan.

NCPAC worked diligently for the nomination of Ronald Reagan in the 1976 Presidential election. Its efforts fell just short in a bitter disappointment. Kenny Klinge (Reagan's Convention manager) and Roger Stone then chose to dedicate NCPAC to the 1977 elections in Virginia, backing Wyatt Durrette for Attorney General and a number of General Assembly candidates. While Durrette was generally considered the favorite having been Reagan's co-chair in Virginia, he lost the nomination to Marshall Coleman by 0.46 votes in a contentious convention in Roanoke. A number of NCPAC-backed Assembly candidates did win that fall. (Written by Donald Smith, a Field Rep for NCPAC in 1977.)

NCPAC became one of the first groups to circumvent the contribution limits of the [Federal Election Campaign Act] (FECA) by exploiting the "independent expenditure" loophole permitted under a 1976 U.S. Supreme Court ruling. Although federal law restricted political action committees' expenditures to $10,000 per candidate, an organization could spend unlimited amounts of money supporting or opposing a particular candidate as long as their campaign activity was not coordinated with a candidate. NCPAC pooled independent contributions in order to make independent expenditures on campaign attack ads. Not only did this circumvent campaign finance restrictions, but it prevented candidates from being associated with advertising created on their behalf. NCPAC Chairman Terry Dolan was quoted as saying, "A group like ours could lie through its teeth, and the candidate it helps stays clean." Dolan later said he was describing a hypothetical situation, not NCPAC's actual tactics.

=== 1978 election ===
NCPAC's first major target was Democratic Senator Dick Clark of Iowa in the election of 1978. Three weeks before the November 1978 election, incumbent Clark had a 30 percentage-point lead in campaign polls, but he lost to Republican Roger Jepsen, 52 to 48 percent. Clark's defeat was attributed to intense anti-Clark campaigning conducted by direct mail, mailgrams, and leaflet distribution during the final weeks of the campaign, attacking Clark for his positions on abortion, gun control, and the Panama Canal Treaty. NCPAC took credit for Clark's defeat and was encouraged to expand its efforts in the 1980 election.

=== 1980 election ===
Clark's defeat, for which NCPAC took credit, encouraged the group and other allied organizations to expand their efforts in the 1980 election, when NCPAC spent at least $1.2 million. Four of the six incumbent Democratic Senators targeted by NCPAC in 1980, John Culver (Iowa), George McGovern (South Dakota), Frank Church (Idaho), and Birch Bayh (Indiana), were unseated. Senators Alan Cranston of California and Thomas Eagleton of Missouri were also targeted, but achieved re-election.

=== 1982 election ===
NCPAC hoped to repeat its success in the 1982 election. Initially, the group targeted a list of 20 Senators for defeat, including Pat Moynihan of New York, Ted Kennedy of Massachusetts, Paul Sarbanes of Maryland and John Melcher of Montana. The organization later trimmed its target list to five incumbents, and spent $4.5 million in the 1982 elections. However, only one of its targets, Democrat Howard Cannon of Nevada, failed to win re-election. Sarbanes was charged with being "too liberal for Maryland," but voters did not respond to the NCPAC message. Sarbanes made NCPAC's tactics a major issue in his campaign. Democratic Senator John Melcher, a veterinarian, countered a commercial that claimed he was "too liberal for Montana" by running a TV commercial of his own featuring cows. After a shot of "out-of-staters" carrying a briefcase full of money off an airplane, one cow remarked, "Did ya hear about those city slickers bad-mouthing Doc Melcher? One of 'em was stepping in what they've been trying to sell." In a 1981 fundraising letter for the NCPAC, Senator Jesse Helms of North Carolina warned, "Your tax dollars are being used to pay for grade school classes that teach our children that cannibalism, wife-swapping, and the murder of infants and the elderly are acceptable behaviour."

=== Later years ===
L. Brent Bozell succeeded Dolan as the group's head after Dolan's death in December 1986, but resigned at the end of the following August over disagreement with the board on future direction of the group. The organization faded away a few years later.
