= Terry Dolan (activist) =

American political activist (1950–1986)

John Terrence "Terry" Dolan (1950 – December 28, 1986) was an American New Right political activist who was a co-founder and chairman of the National Conservative Political Action Committee (NCPAC). Dolan was also, during the mid to late 1970s, in the leadership of Christian Voice, "the nation's oldest conservative Christian lobby".

While Dolan was a proponent of family values and the organizations he led were persistently critical of gay rights, he was revealed to have been a closeted homosexual, who frequented gay bars in Washington, D.C. At a Washington fundraising event in 1985, AIDS activist Larry Kramer reportedly tossed a glass of water in his face. Dolan died from complications of AIDS at the age of 36. He is one of many with panels dedicated to them (in his case three panels) in the AIDS Quilt.

== Political activities ==
=== College Republicans ===
A native of Connecticut, Dolan became active in politics during his teens as a Republican volunteer. At age 21, he worked as a paid organizer in Richard Nixon's 1972 presidential re-election campaign. The following year, he was a candidate for chairman of the College Republican National Committee but lost to Karl Rove.

=== Christian Voice to Moral Majority ===
After Christian Voice co-founder Dr. Robert Grant ousted Dolan, Howard Phillips, and Richard Viguerie from the Christian Voice organization, the trio went on to help persuade Jerry Falwell to build a new Christian Right organization, the Moral Majority.

=== National Conservative Political Action Committee ===
Dolan was later a co-founder and chairman of the National Conservative Political Action Committee (NCPAC). He co-authored Reagan: A President Succeeds with Gregory Fossedal. His brother, Anthony R. Dolan, was also a political activist and Ronald Reagan's chief presidential speechwriter.

Dolan was a member of the Council for National Policy Board of Governors, a member of the advisory board for CAUSA International (an educational, anti-communist organization founded by Unification Church leader Sun Myung Moon), and Director of Conservatives Against Liberal Legislation (CALL).
