= Robert Grant (Christian leader) =

Robert G. Grant (born 1936) is an American political activist, and the former leader of several Christian right groups in the United States. He is considered by many the "father" of the Christian Right in the US. He served as the chairman of Christian Voice, "the nation’s oldest conservative Christian lobby", and the American Freedom Coalition.

== Early life and education ==
Grant earned a B.A. in history from Wheaton College in Wheaton, Illinois, a Bachelor of Divinity and Master of Divinity from Fuller Theological Seminary in Pasadena, California, and a Ph.D from California Graduate School of Theology in Garden Grove, California. He was also awarded a diploma from the St. Paul Bible College in St. Paul, Minnesota.

== Political activism ==
Concerned about what he saw as moral decay in America, Grant founded American Christian Cause in Southern California in 1974 to fight against pornography and homosexual rights. In 1978, he relocated to Washington, D.C., and founded Christian Voice, the first major Christian Right organization in America. Grant quickly built Christian Voice, recruiting over 107,000 dues paying members including nearly 37,000 pastors. Grant involved national conservative leaders in his movement, including Gary Jarmin, Howard Phillips, Terry Dolan, and Richard Viguerie. Christian Voice-backed candidates, including Ronald Reagan, Steve Symms, Dan Quayle, and John Porter East, defeated incumbents in the 1978 and 1980 elections.

Grant's group campaigned for the election of President Ronald Reagan in the 1980 presidential election. After Phillips, Dolan, and Viguerie left several years later, they and Jerry Falwell formed a new Christian right organization, the Moral Majority. Similar groups subsequently founded included Concerned Women for America, American Coalition for Traditional Values, and the Christian Coalition. Grant was the founding president of the American Freedom Coalition with Ralph Abernathy. He is currently on the board of governors of the Council for National Policy.

== Media work ==
Grant appeared on 60 Minutes, Nightline, CBS, NBC News, the Morton Downey, Jr. Show, Good Morning America, CBS Nightwatch and various local and national radio and television talk shows. He has been quoted in Time, Newsweek, U.S. News & World Report, Washington Post, Christianity Today, and other publications.

Grant has also worked as a radio talk show host, as the co-host of the television talk show Let Freedom Ring, and on the publisher's council of Conservative Digest Magazine, and is the publisher of American Freedom Journal.

== Pastoral work ==
Grant is an ordained Baptist minister. He has worked in various ministerial positions, as the religion editor of The Washington Times, and has led over 125 pilgrimages to Israel. He was the founder of the California Graduate School of Theology. He was a member of Ed McAteer's organization, Religious Roundtable. He was founding chairman Coalition for Religious Freedom and the Traditional Values Coalition, both with Tim LaHaye. He founded the United Community Church of Glendale, California.

== Awards and recognition ==
- Shalom Award, Nation of Israel
