= Christian Voice (United States) =

American political advocacy group

- Founded: 1978
- Founder: Rev. Dr. Robert Grant
- Dissolved: 2012
- Type: 501(4)
- Headquarters: Washington, D.C., U.S.
- Key people: Rev. Dr. Robert Grant
- Website: Internet Archives

Christian Voice was an American conservative political advocacy group, known as part of the Christian right within U.S. politics. In 1980, Christian Voice claimed 107,000 members including 37,000 pastors from 45 denominations. Christian Voice was headquartered at The Heritage Foundation in the 1970s and 1980s and was located in Alexandria, Virginia.

Christian Voice was best known as the originator and developer of the Moral Report Cards the "Congressional Report Card" and the "Candidates Scorecard" that were issued mainly between 1980 and 1984. It helped organize grassroots action through use of its "Church Networking Guide".

== History ==
Christian Voice was founded by Robert Grant and Richard Zone in 1978. Paul Weyrich, the leader of the conservative think tank the Heritage Foundation, and a chief architect of the Christian right movement, which the Christian Voice was a part of, met with Grant in 1976 and agreed to let Grant set up headquarters for his future organization at the headquarters of The Heritage Foundation. Weyrich, a member of the Melkite Greek Catholic Church, then recruited others to join the group.

Weyrich, Viguerie and Phillips also abandoned the group in 1978 after Grant announced that the Christian Voice was "a sham" that was "controlled by three Catholics and a Jew;" they then decided to align with Jerry Falwell and form the Moral Majority.

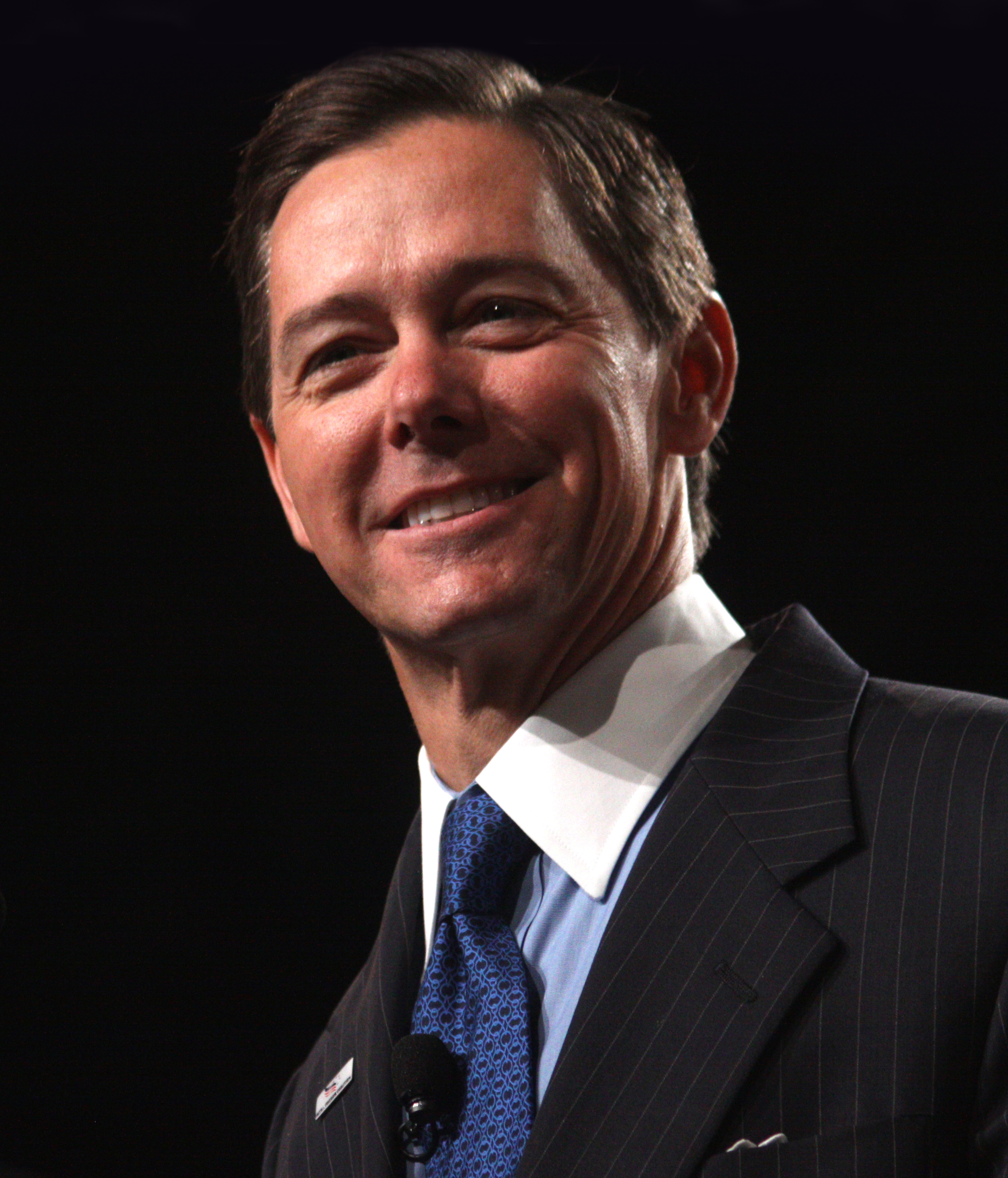
Ralph Eugene Reed Jr. (formerly of the Christian Coalition of America), 2011.

Christian Voice sought to counter US President Jimmy Carter's influence over the American Christian community. A Democrat who embraced the born-again Christian label, Carter gained high levels of popularity among Christian conservatives during his 1976 campaign.

The organization's board of directors included US Senators Orrin Hatch, Roger Jepsen and James A. McClure.

== Decline ==
As of 2012, the Christian Voice was still maintained by the American Service Council as a vehicle for direct mail campaigns both the targeting of voters and contributors and the delivery of petitions to the U.S. federal government. The American Service Council did not maintain a separate Christian Voice web site and stopped listing the Christian Voice on its own web site by 2014. The American Service Council dissolved in 2024.

== Principals ==
- Terry Dolan
- Colonel V. Doner, Chief Strategist (1978–1986)
- Robert Grant, Founder, Chairman and CEO (1978–1998; 2003–2008)
- Richard Viguerie
