= Christian right =

Socially conservative Christian political ideology

The Christian right are Christian political factions characterized by their strong support of socially conservative and traditionalist policies. Christian conservatives seek to influence politics and public policy with their interpretation of the teachings of Christianity.

In the United States, the Christian right (otherwise known as the New Christian Right or the Religious Right) is an informal coalition which was formed around a core of conservative Evangelical Protestants and conservative Roman Catholics. The Christian right draws additional support from politically conservative mainline Protestants, Orthodox Jews, and Latter Day Saints. The movement in American politics became a dominant feature of U.S. conservatism from the late 1970s onwards. The Christian right gained powerful influence within the Republican Party during the presidency of Ronald Reagan in the 1980s. Its influence draws from grassroots activism as well as from focus on social issues and the ability to motivate the electorate around those issues. With the ongoing second presidency of Donald Trump, the influence of the Christian right and Christian nationalism have risen heavily within the United States.

The Christian right has advanced socially conservative positions on issues such as creationism in public education, school prayer, temperance, Christian nationalism, and Sunday Sabbatarianism, as well as opposition to the teaching of biological evolution, secularism, LGBTQ rights, (Note: comprehensive sex education,) abortion, euthanasia, pornography, embryonic stem cell research, and the use of drugs. Although the term Christian right is most commonly associated with U.S. politics, similar Christian conservative groups can be found in the political cultures of other Christian-majority countries.

== Terminology ==
In the United States, the Christian right is otherwise known as the New Christian Right (NCR) or the Religious Right, although some consider the religious right to be "a slightly broader category than Christian Right".

John C. Green of the Pew Forum on Religion and Public Life states that Jerry Falwell used the label religious right to describe himself. Gary Schneeberger, vice president of media and public relations for Focus on the Family, states that "[t]erms like 'religious right' have been traditionally used in a pejorative way to suggest extremism. The phrase 'socially conservative evangelicals' is not very exciting, but that's certainly the way to do it."

Evangelical Protestant leaders like Tony Perkins of the Family Research Council have called attention to the problem of equating the term Christian right with Evangelical Christianity. Although Evangelicals constitute the core constituency of the Christian right, not all Evangelicals fit the description, and a number of Roman Catholics are also members of the Christian right's core base. The problem of description is further complicated by the fact that the label religious conservative or conservative Christian may apply to other religious groups as well. For instance, Anabaptist Christians (most notably Amish, Mennonites, Hutterites, the Bruderhof Communities, Schwarzenau Brethren, River Brethren, and Apostolic Christians) are theologically, socially, and culturally conservative; however, there are no overtly political organizations associated with these Christian denominations, which are usually indifferent towards politics. Evangelical theologian and pastor Tim Keller stated that conservative Christianity (theology) predates the Christian right (politics). Keller asserted that being a theological conservative does not require a person to be a political conservative, and that some political progressive views around economics, helping the poor, the redistribution of wealth, and racial diversity are compatible with theologically conservative Christianity. Conservative writer Rod Dreher has stated that a Christian can be theologically conservative while still holding left-wing economic views or even socialist views.

== History ==
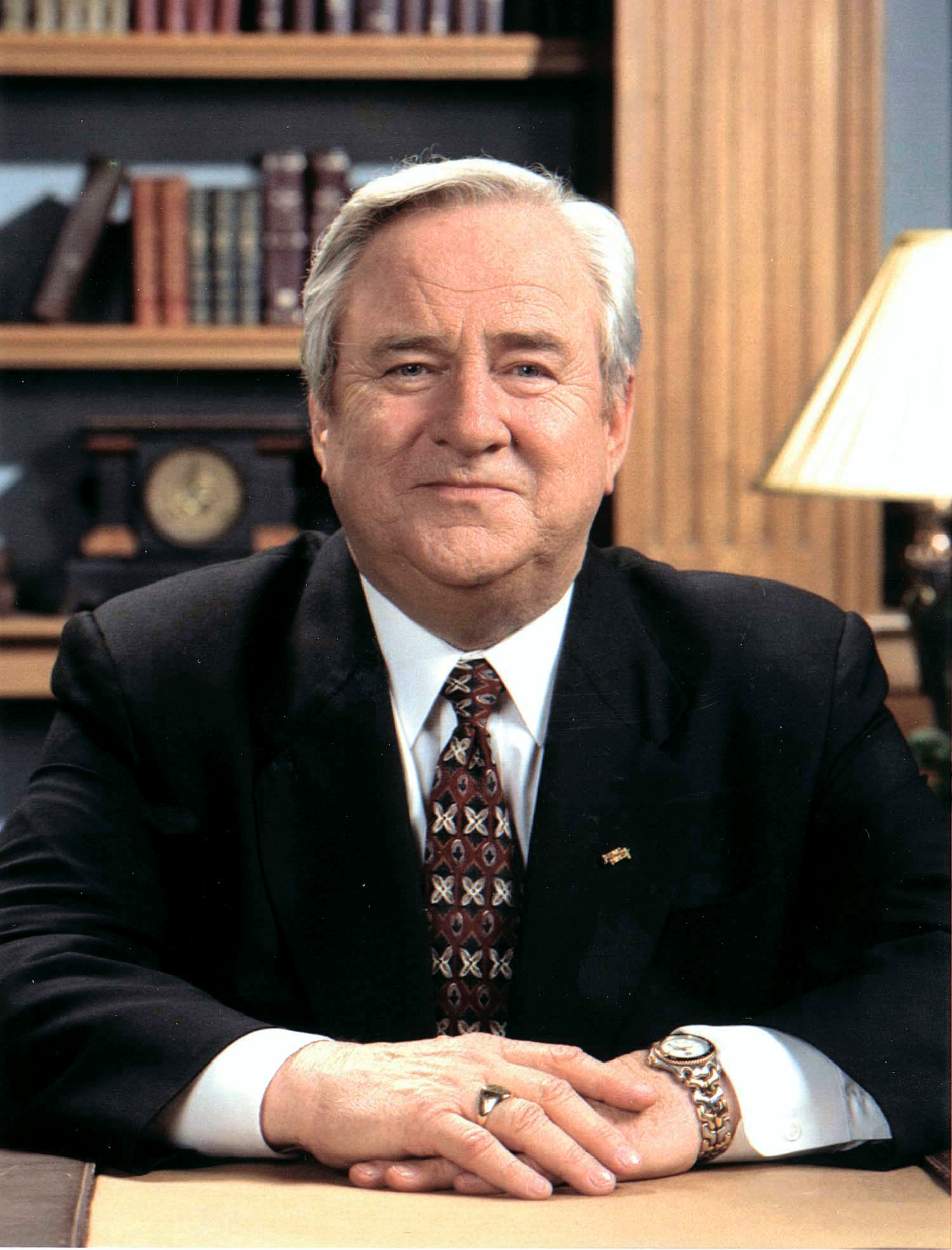
Jerry Falwell, whose founding of the "Moral Majority" was a key step in the formation of the "New Christian Right"

=== Background and predecessors ===
In 1863, representatives from eleven Christian denominations in the United States organized the National Reform Association. The organization's goal was to amend the U.S. Constitution to make the country a Christian state. The National Reform Association is one of the first organizations through which adherents from several Christian denominations worked together in an attempt to enshrine Christianity in American governance. The Christian Civic League of Maine (founded in 1897), and other early organizations of the Christian right, supported the aims of the temperance movement. During the 19th and early 20th centuries, there were also a number of Evangelical Protestants who supported progressive causes. The Scopes trial in 1925 reportedly resulted in most Evangelicals abandoning the political arena in an organized fashion. An Evangelical political subculture emerged, largely isolated from the outside world, consisting of various organizations that laid the groundwork for the Christian right in the late 1970s.

While the beginning of the influence of the Christian right is typically traced to the late 1970s, Daniel K. Williams argues in God's Own Party that it had actually been involved in politics for most of the twentieth century. He also notes that the Christian right had previously been in alliance with the Republican Party in the 1940s through 1960s on matters such as opposition to communism and defending "a Protestant-based moral order". Similarly, scholar Celestini Carmen traces the John Birch Society (JBS)'s focus on culture war issues and rhetoric of apocalypticism, conspiracism, and fear to the rise of the Christian right through JBS members and Christian rightist activists Tim LaHaye, Phyllis Schlafly, and others.

In light of the state atheism espoused by communist countries aligned with the Eastern Bloc during the height of the Cold War (1950s–1960s), secularization came to be seen by many Americans sympathetic to proto-Christian right narratives as the biggest threat to American and Christian values. These fears resulted in a number of actions by the U.S. federal government throughout the 1950s, including the establishment of the National Day of Prayer, the addition of the motto "In God We Trust" to U.S. currency, and the addition of the phrase "Under God" to the Pledge of Allegiance. The alienation of Southern Democrats from the Democratic Party contributed to the rise of the right, as the counterculture of the 1960s provoked fear of social disintegration amongst many conservatives. In addition, as the Democratic Party became identified with progressive and liberal policies, social conservatives joined the Republican Party in increasing numbers. Despite these trends, many White Evangelicals remained politically inactive and were not a unified voting bloc, with many on the Evangelical left believing political activism and engagement to be inconsistent with their beliefs.

=== Early history and rise, 1970s–1980s ===
The movement that would become the Christian right had much of its origin in the work and activism of conservative operative Paul Weyrich, who had foreseen the potential to organize conservative Evangelicals and Roman Catholics into a political force in the early 1960s and had reportedly started trying to do so during the 1964 U.S. Presidential election. Weyrich tried a number of wedge issues throughout the 1960s and early 1970s, including abortion, pornography, the proposed Equal Rights Amendment, and school prayer, without success. Weyrich was not successful until the legality of segregation academies began to be challenged in the early 1970s. In 1970, the Internal Revenue Service adopted a policy of rescinding the tax-exempt status of private schools that did not admit African–American students, and the following year, the Supreme Court ruled in Coit v. Green that organizations that voluntarily practice racial discrimination are not eligible for tax exemption. The origin of this case was a legal challenge to the tax-exempt status of a group of segregation academies in Holmes County, Mississippi. Many of the schools targeted by these rulings were church-sponsored, and these actions reportedly caught the attention of a number of evangelical leaders, including Jerry Falwell. The largest educational institution targeted by the IRS was Bob Jones University, which lost its tax exemption in 1976 due to its policy prohibiting interracial dating. This action reportedly further caught the ire of evangelical leaders, many of whom believed that the IRS was overstepping its legal authority. Weyrich also sought to frame the IRS crackdown on segregation academics as an issue of government intrusion and attacks on religious freedom, effectively diverting attention from the racial aspect of the issue.

During the 1976 U.S. Presidential election, Jimmy Carter, who described himself as an Evangelical, born-again Christian, received the support of a majority of American evangelicals and the emerging Christian right largely because of his much-acclaimed religious conversion. However, the issue of segregation academies carried over into Carter's presidency, and in 1978, the IRS proposed a new rule that would have revoked the tax exemption of private schools based on their racial demographic composition relative to that of their respective communities. While this rule never went into effect, it provoked fierce backlash and protests from evangelical leaders and church congregants alike, with many believing it to be an attack on non-discriminatory institutions and religious freedom. The IRS reportedly received over 150,000 letters in opposition to this proposal, mostly from Christians. This action reportedly encouraged many white evangelicals to become politically active for the first time, and turned them against Jimmy Carter. Weyrich later stated that what got evangelicals involved in politics was "Jimmy Carter's intervention against the Christian schools, trying to deny them tax-exempt status on the basis of so-called de facto segregation", and Richard Viguerie said that the 1978 IRS action "kicked a sleeping dog." Others, including religious right leader Ed Dobson and conservative activist Grover Norquist have affirmed this as the beginnings of the religious right.

Around the same time, Weyrich realized that support for segregation academies was not viable and began to look for other issues. The unexpected success of predominantly Catholic anti-abortion activists in the 1978 midterms convinced Weyrich that opposition to abortion might work as a wedge issue to keep evangelicals politically mobilized. He favored the issue because it could be framed in the context of family values and be used to claim moral superiority, as well as attack second-wave feminism. Prior to this time, the Catholic Church was the only Christian denomination that was staunchly anti-abortion, with many Protestant and evangelical denominations, including the Southern Baptist Convention, either supporting the legalization of the procedure in some circumstances, or not taking a stance on the issue. The following year, filmmaker Frank Schaeffer produced a series of anti-abortion films titled Whatever Happened to the Human Race?, starring his father, evangelist Francis Schaeffer and pediatric surgeon Dr. C. Everett Koop. That same year, abortion was reportedly suggested as a wedge issue during a conference call between a number of religious right leaders, although many were still skeptical of its ability to mobilize evangelicals. Schaeffer's films were also reportedly met with tepid reception during a tour in which they were shown at numerous churches around the United States, and leaders like Jerry Falwell were initially hesitant to utilize abortion, believing that its stereotype amongst evangelicals as a "Catholic issue" would hinder its ability to politically mobilize them. It was not until the early 1980s that abortion would become in effect the signature wedge issue of the religious right, and conservative evangelicals began joining the anti-abortion movement in large numbers.

In 1979, the Moral Majority, widely considered the first religious right organization, was founded by Falwell, Weyrich, and other associates and began emphasizing such issues as abortion, pornography, gay rights, and opposition to the Equal Rights Amendment, and a perceived moral decline of the United States, and played a major role in mobilizing evangelicals to support Ronald Reagan in the 1980 United States presidential election. Some Christians expressed skepticism of Reagan's background as a twice-married former Hollywood actor with a liberal abortion record and support for no fault divorce as Governor of California. In response to the rise of the Christian right, the 1980 Republican Party platform assumed a number of its positions, including the resumption of public school prayer. While the platform also opposed abortion, leaned towards restricting taxpayer funding for abortions, and sought a constitutional amendment bestowing personhood to fetuses, it also acknowledged the fact that many Americans, including Republicans, were divided on the issue. At this time, both major political parties were divided internally on abortion rights, and it was not until the late 1980s that abortion came to be viewed as a partisan issue. Throughout his 1980 presidential campaign, Reagan said that if he were stranded on a desert island he would want the Bible, promised religious leaders that he wouldn't let the IRS interfere with Christian schools, questioned the legitimacy of evolution and suggested that creationism should also be taught, and encouraged evangelicals to become more politically active. Against the backdrop of Bob Jones University v. United States, Reagan's DOJ informed the supreme court "that the Administration was dropping its opposition to lawsuits brought by the Bob Jones and Goldsboro schools, seeking restoration of their tax-exempt status." Reagan's administration defended the move by arguing that the denial of tax-exempt status was up to Congress. After a backlash from critics, Reagan proposed legislation that would deny tax-exempt status to segregated schools, but Congress never passed the legislation, believing that the IRS already had this authority. Over the next two decades, Christian rightist citizens became more politically active in a time period labeled the New Christian Right. In addition to the "Moral Majority" (which dissolved in the late 1980s), the Christian right was associated with new organizations throughout the 1980s and 1990s, including the Christian Coalition of America, Focus on the Family, the Alliance Defending Freedom, the Family Research Council, and the American Center for Law & Justice.

=== Later history, 1990s to present ===
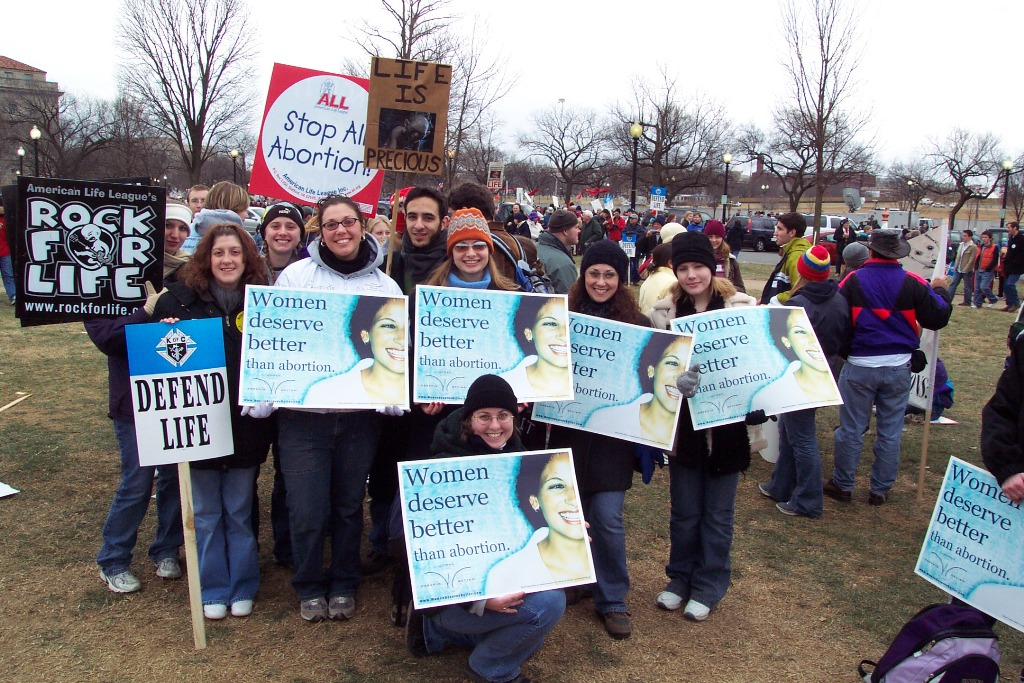
Demonstrators at the 2004 March for Life in Washington, D.C.

Writing in 2016, Patricia Miller states that the "alliance between evangelical leaders and the Catholic bishops has been a cornerstone of the Christian Right for nearly twenty years".

Since its inception, the Christian right has engaged in battles over abortion, euthanasia, contraception, pornography, gambling, obscenity, Christian nationalism, Sabbatarianism (concerning Sunday blue laws), state-sanctioned public school prayer, public school textbook inclusion of creationism (if not prohibition on teaching mainstream evolutionary science), LGBTQ rights, and sexual education. Ralph Reed, the chairman of the Christian Coalition, stated that the 1988 presidential campaign of Pat Robertson was the "political crucible" that led to the proliferation of Christian right groups in the United States. The Christian right is perhaps best known for its alliance with the U.S. anti-abortion movement and its efforts to overturn the 1973 Roe v Wade ruling, which established abortion as a constitutionally protected right in the U.S. Changing political contexts led to the Christian right's advocacy for other issues, such as opposition to euthanasia and campaigning for abstinence-only sex education.

In the 2016 presidential election, the Christian right supported Donald Trump, who promised to appoint Supreme Court justices who would overturn Roe v Wade. Many evangelicals were initially hesitant to support Trump due to his character flaws and lack of religiosity. Trump ultimately appointed three justices to the Supreme Court, all of whom voted to overturn the 1973 decision in Dobbs v. Jackson Women's Health Organization in 2022. Trump's support amongst evangelicals has also been attributed by some, including journalist Tim Alberta, to a fear that white evangelicals and evangelicalism, if not Christianity more broadly, are losing their political power. Since the 1990s, the share of Americans who identify as Christian has declined, part of a larger decline of Christianity in the Western world. Alberta, and others, have argued that many white evangelicals see Trump as a savior figure, and that his rhetoric about returning the United States to a perceived state of former greatness, embodied by his campaign slogan "Make America Great Again", resonates strongly with them. In addition to their declining numbers, many have also reported a fear of an increasingly secularizing world, which some scholars and commentators have argued led them to embrace Trumpism. On many occasions, Trump has stated that he believes Christianity is under attack in the United States. Trump continued to receive strong support from the Christian right in the 2020 and 2024 presidential elections. Since the 2010s, the Christian right has increasingly supported other measures targeting the separation of church and state, including school vouchers and efforts to integrate the Christian Bible and the Ten Commandments into public school curricula. By the 2020s, the Christian right has increasingly been influenced by Christian nationalism.

=== Organizational ability ===
==== Grassroots activism ====
The Christian right wields significant influence in American politics due to their high voter turnout and strong motivation to support right-wing candidates. They actively participate in political events, canvassing and distributing literature without needing financial compensation, driven by their devotion to the cause.

==== Political leaders and institutions ====
Led by Robert Grant's advocacy group Christian Voice, Jerry Falwell's Moral Majority, Ed McAteer's Religious Roundtable Council, James Dobson's Focus on the Family, Paul Weyrich's Free Congress Research and Education Foundation, and the Heritage Foundation, and Pat Robertson's Christian Broadcasting Network, the new Christian right combined conservative politics with evangelical and fundamentalist religion. The birth of the new Christian right, however, is usually traced to a 1979 meeting wherein televangelist Jerry Falwell was urged to create a "Moral Majority" organization. In 1979, Weyrich was in a discussion with Falwell when he remarked that there was a "moral majority" of Americans ready to be called to political action. Weyrich later recalled in a 2007 interview with the Milwaukee Journal Sentinel that after he mentioned the term "moral majority", Falwell "turned to his people and said, 'That's the name of our organization.'"

Weyrich would then engineer a strong union between the Republican Party and many culturally conservative Christians. Soon, "moral majority" became a general term for the conservative political activism of evangelicals and fundamentalists such as Pat Robertson, James Robison, and Jerry Falwell. Howard Schweber, professor at the University of Wisconsin-Madison, writes that "in the past two decades", "Catholic politicians have emerged as leading figures in the religious conservative movement."

== Institutions in the United States ==
=== National organizations ===
An early attempt to bring the Christian right into American politics began in 1974 when Robert Grant, a movement leader, who founded the American Christian Cause to advocate Christian ideological teachings in Southern California. Concerned that Christians overwhelmingly voted for President Jimmy Carter in 1976, Grant founded Christian Voice to rally Christian voters behind socially conservative candidates. Prior to his alliance with Falwell, Weyrich sought an alliance with Grant. Grant and other Christian Voice staff soon set up their main office at the headquarters of Weyrich's Heritage Foundation. The alliance between Weyrich and Grant fell apart in 1978.

In the late 1980s, Pat Robertson founded the Christian Coalition of America, building from his 1988 presidential run, with Republican activist Ralph Reed, who became the spokesman for the Coalition. In 1992, the national Christian Coalition, Inc., headquartered in Virginia Beach, Virginia, began producing voter guides, which it distributed to conservative Christian churches, both Protestant and Catholic, with the blessing of the Roman Catholic Archdiocese of New York. Under the leadership of Reed and Robertson, the Coalition quickly became the most prominent voice in the conservative Christian movement, its influence culminating with an effort to support the election of a conservative Christian to the presidency in 1996. In addition, they have encouraged the convergence of conservative Christian ideology with political issues, such as healthcare, the economy, education and crime.

Political activists lobbied within the Republican party locally and nationally to influence party platforms and nominations. More recently James Dobson's group Focus on the Family, based in Colorado Springs, and the Family Research Council in Washington D.C. have gained enormous respect from Republican lawmakers. While strongly advocating for these ideological matters, Dobson himself is warier of the political spectrum and much of the resources of his group are devoted to other aims such as media. However, as a private citizen, Dobson has stated his opinion on presidential elections; on February 5, 2008, Dobson issued a statement regarding the 2008 presidential election and his strong disappointment with the Republican party's candidates.

In an essay written in 1996, Ralph Reed argued against the moral absolutist tone of Christian right leaders, arguing for the Republican Party Platform to stress the moral dimension of abortion rather than placing emphasis on overturning Roe v. Wade. Reed believes that pragmatism is the best way to advocate for the Christian right.

=== Partisan activity of churches ===
Overtly partisan actions by churches could threaten their 501(c)(3) tax-exempt status due to the Johnson Amendment of the Internal Revenue Code. In one notable example, the former pastor of the East Waynesville Baptist Church in Waynesville, North Carolina "told the congregation that anyone who planned to vote for Democratic Sen. John Kerry should either leave the church or repent". The church later expelled nine members who had voted for Kerry and refused to repent, which led to criticism on the national level. The pastor resigned and the ousted church members were allowed to return.

The Alliance Defense Fund, a Christian right group now known as the Alliance Defending Freedom, started the Pulpit Freedom Initiative in 2008. ADF states that "[t]he goal of Pulpit Freedom Sunday is simple: have the Johnson Amendment declared unconstitutional – and once and for all remove the ability of the IRS to censor what a pastor says from the pulpit."

=== Electoral activity ===
White evangelicals in the US have tended toward affiliation with the Republican party.

Mainline Protestants, which once defined the center of American political, religious, and cultural life, have declined by two-thirds in the past fifty years.

Christian voters, especially white Christian voters, generally favored Donald Trump over Kamala Harris in the 2024 US Presidential election.

Both Christian right and secular polling organizations sometimes conduct polls to determine which presidential candidates will receive the support of Christian right constituents. One such poll is taken at the Family Research Council's Values Voter Summit. George W. Bush's electoral success owed much to his overwhelming support from white evangelical voters, who comprise 23% of the vote. In 2000 he received 68% of the white evangelical vote; in 2004 that percentage rose to 78%. In 2016, Donald Trump received 81% of the white evangelical vote.

=== Education ===
The Home School Legal Defense Association was co-founded in 1983 by Michael Farris, who would later establish Generation Joshua and Patrick Henry College, and Michael Smith. This organization attempts to challenge laws that serve as obstacles to allowing parents to home-school their children and to organize the disparate group of homeschooling families into a cohesive bloc. The number of homeschooling families has increased in the last twenty years, and around 80 percent of these families identify themselves as evangelicals.

The main universities associated with the Christian right in the United States are:

- Bob Jones University – Protestant Fundamentalist institution, founded in 1927.
- Christendom College – Roman Catholic institution, founded in 1977
- Liberty University – Baptist institution, founded in 1971
- Regent University – Evangelical Christian institution, founded in 1977

=== Media ===
The media has played a major role in the rise of the Christian right since the 1920s and has continued to be a powerful force for political Christianity today. The role of the media for the Religious right has been influential in its ability to connect Christian audiences to the larger American culture while at the same time bringing and keeping religion into play as both a political and a cultural force. The political agenda of the Christian right has been disseminated to the public through a variety of media outlets including radio broadcasting, television, and literature.

Religious broadcasting began in the 1920s through the radio. Between the 1950s and 1980s, TV became a powerful way for the Christian right to influence the public through shows such as Pat Robertson's The 700 Club and The Family Channel (now Freeform). The Internet has also helped the Christian right reach a much larger audience. These organizations' websites play a strong role in popularising the Christian right's stances on cultural and political issues, and inform interested viewers on how to get involved. For example, the Christian Coalition of America has used the Internet to inform the public, as well as to sell merchandise and gather members.

== Views ==
=== Capital punishment ===
Support for the death penalty has divided Catholics and Evangelical Protestants within the Christian Right: The Roman Catholic Church is against capital punishment, while the Southern Baptist Convention and the Lutheran Church-Missouri Synod support it. Certain conservative Catholics, however, have supported the death penalty. The Moral Majority made strong support for capital punishment part of its socially conservative agenda. Surveys have found that Evangelical Protestants are more likely than any other American religious group to favor the death penalty.

=== Education ===
The Christian right strongly advocates for a system of educational choice, using a system of school vouchers, instead of public education. Vouchers would be government funded and could be redeemed for "a specified maximum sum per child per years if spent on approved educational services". This method would allow parents to determine which school their child attends while relieving the economic burden associated with private schools. The concept is popular among constituents of church-related schools, including those affiliated with Evangelical Lutheranism and Roman Catholicism.

=== Evolution ===
The Protestant members of the Christian right in the United States generally promote the teaching of creationism and intelligent design as opposed to, or alongside, biological evolution. Some supporters of the Christian right have opposed the teaching of evolution in the past, but they did not have the ability to stop it being taught in public schools as was done during the Scopes Trial in Dayton, Tennessee, in which a science teacher went on trial for teaching about the subject of evolution in a public school. Other "Christian right organizations supported the teaching of creationism, along with evolution, in public schools", specifically promoting theistic evolution (also known as evolutionary creationism) in which God is regarded as the originator of the process.

Members of and organizations associated with the Christian right, such as the Discovery Institute, created and popularized the modern concept of intelligent design, which became widely known only with the publication of the book Of Pandas and People in 1989. The Discovery Institute, through their intelligent design initiative called the Center for Science and Culture, has endorsed the teach the controversy approach. According to its proponents, such an approach would ensure that both the strengths and weaknesses of evolutionary theory were discussed in the curriculum. This tactic was criticized by Judge John E. Jones III in Kitzmiller v. Dover Area School District, describing it as "at best disingenuous, and at worst a canard."

The overwhelming majority of scientific research, both in the United States and elsewhere, has concluded that the theory of evolution, using the technical definition of the word theory, is the only viable explanation of the development of life, and an overwhelming majority of biologists strongly support its presentation in public school science classes. Outside the United States, as well as among American Catholics and Mainline Protestants, Christian conservatives have generally come to accept the theory of evolution.

=== Sex education ===
Some Christian groups advocate for the removal of sex education literature from public schools, for parental opt-out of comprehensive sex education, or for abstinence-only sex education. Sam Harris has written that thirty percent of America's sex-education programs are abstinence based and ineffective.

=== Schooling ===
The Christian right promotes homeschooling and private schooling as a valid alternative to public education for parents who object to the content being taught at school. The percentage of children being homeschooled rose from 1.7% of the student population in 1999 to 2.2% in 2003, and much of this increase has been attributed to the desire to incorporate Christian teachings into the curriculum. In 2003, 72% of parents who homeschooled their children cited the ability to provide religious or moral instruction as the reason for removing their children from public schools. The Kitzmiller v. Dover Area School District case established that creationism cannot be taught in public schools, and in response officials have increasingly appropriated public funds for charter schools that teach curricula like Accelerated Christian Education.

=== Sunday Sabbatarianism ===
The Christian right is in favor of legislation that maintains and promotes Sunday Sabbatarianism, such as Sunday blue laws that forbid shopping and restrict the sale of alcohol on Sundays, which is the Lord's Day in mainstream Christianity.

=== Role of government ===
Supporters of the Christian right have no one unified stance on the role of government since the movement is primarily one that advocates social conservatism; in fact, "struggles [have] broken out in state party organizations" between supporters of the Christian right and other conservatives. It promotes conservative interpretations of the Bible as the basis for moral values and enforcing such values by legislation. Evangelical Christians have generally supported laissez-faire economic policies since the New Deal era, while Catholics alternatively accept the Catholic Church's strong support for labor unions.

=== Church and state relations ===
The Christian right believes that separation of church and state is not explicit in the American Constitution, believing instead that such separation is a creation of what it claims are activist judges in the judicial system. In the United States, the Christian right often supports their claims by stating that the country was "founded by Christians as a Christian Nation." Members of the Christian right take the position that the Establishment Clause bars the federal government from establishing or sponsoring a state church (e.g., the Church of England), but does not prevent the government from acknowledging religion. The Christian right points out that the term "separation of church and state" is derived from a letter written by Thomas Jefferson, not from the Constitution itself. Furthermore, the Alliance Defending Freedom (ADF) takes the view that the concept of "separation of church and state" has been used by the American Civil Liberties Union and its allies to inhibit public acknowledgment of Christianity and restrict the religious freedoms of Christians.

Thus, Christian right leaders have argued that the Establishment Clause does not prohibit the display of religion in the public sphere. Leaders, therefore, believe that public institutions should be allowed, or even required, to display the Ten Commandments. This interpretation has been repeatedly rejected by the courts, which have found that such displays violate the Establishment Clause. Public officials though are prohibited from using their authority in which the primary effect is "advancing or prohibiting religion", according to the Lemon Supreme Court test, and there cannot be an "excessive entanglement with religion" and the government. Some, such as Bryan Fischer of the American Family Association, argue that the First Amendment, which specifically restricts Congress, applies only to the Congress and not the states. This position rejects the incorporation of the Bill of Rights.

Generally, the Christian right supports the presence of religious institutions within government and the public sphere, and advocates for fewer restrictions on government funding for religious charities and schools. Both Catholics and Protestants, according to a 2005 Gallup study, have been supportive of school prayer in public schools.

=== Economics ===
Early American fundamentalists, such as John R. Rice often favored laissez-faire economics and were outspoken critics of the New Deal and later the Great Society. The contemporary Christian right supports economic conservative policies such as tax cuts and social conservative policies such as child tax credits.

This tradition carried forward into the late 20th century, when Reagan era Christian Right leaders helped merge social conservatism with neoliberal economic policy. Organizations such as the Moral Majority aligned themselves with supply-side tax cuts, deregulation, and globalization, even as religious rhetoric was used to frame economic recovery as a moral imperative.

In contemporary politics, this synthesis remains visible but has evolved in notable ways. Survey data show that White evangelical Protestants are among the strongest proponents of capitalism as a defining feature of American identity (PRRI, 2019). At the same time, they have shown significant support for protectionist measures, including tariffs under Donald Trump, with roughly two-thirds expressing support in 2025 and a continued majority backing Trump-era policies more broadly in 2026. This reflects a shift from earlier emphases on free trade toward a more nationalist economic posture.

=== Israel ===
Many evangelical Protestant supporters of the religious right have strongly supported Christian Zionism and the state of Israel in recent decades, encouraging support for Israel within the United States government. Some of them have linked Israel to Biblical prophesies; for example, Ed McAteer, founder of the Moral Majority, said "I believe that we are seeing prophecy unfold so rapidly and dramatically and wonderfully and, without exaggerating, makes me breathless." This belief, an example of dispensationalism, arises from the idea that the establishment of Israel is a prerequisite for the Second Coming of Jesus, because it represents the Biblically prophesied Gathering of Israel. A 2017 poll indicates that this belief is held by 80% of evangelicals, and that half of evangelicals consider it an important cause of their support for the state of Israel. However, other Protestant churches and Christian right ideologues have rejected a religious basis for Zionism and condemned the ideology.

=== Abortion and contraception ===
Historically, large percentages of American Catholics and Evangelical Protestants oppose and have opposed abortion, believing that life begins at conception and that abortion is murder. Therefore, those in the movement have worked toward the overturning of Roe v. Wade (1973), and Planned Parenthood v. Casey (1992). The Christian right has also supported incremental steps to make abortion less available. Such efforts include bans on late-term abortion (including intact dilation and extraction), prohibitions against Medicaid funding and other public funding for elective abortions, removal of taxpayer funding for Planned Parenthood and other organizations that provide abortion services, legislation requiring parental consent or notification for abortions performed on minors, legal protections for unborn victims of violence, legal protections for infants born alive following failed abortions, and bans on abortifacient medications.

The Christian right element in the Reagan coalition strongly supported him in 1980, in the belief that he would appoint Supreme Court justices to overturn Roe v. Wade. They were astonished and dismayed when his first appointment was Sandra Day O'Connor, whom they feared would tolerate abortion. They worked hard to defeat her confirmation but failed.

The Christian right contends that morning-after pills such as Plan B and Ella are possible abortifacients, able to interfere with a fertilized egg's implantation in the uterine wall. The labeling mandated by the U.S. Food and Drug Administration (FDA) for Plan B and Ella state that they may interfere with implantation, but according to a June 2012, The New York Times article, many scientists believe that they work only by interfering with ovulation and are arguing to have the implantation language removed from product labels. The Christian right maintains that the chemical properties of morning-after pills make them abortifacients and that the politics of abortion is influencing scientific judgments. Jonathan Imbody of the Christian Medical Association says he questions "whether ideological considerations are driving these decisions." Specifically, many Catholic members, as well as some conservative Protestant members, of the Christian right have campaigned against contraception altogether.

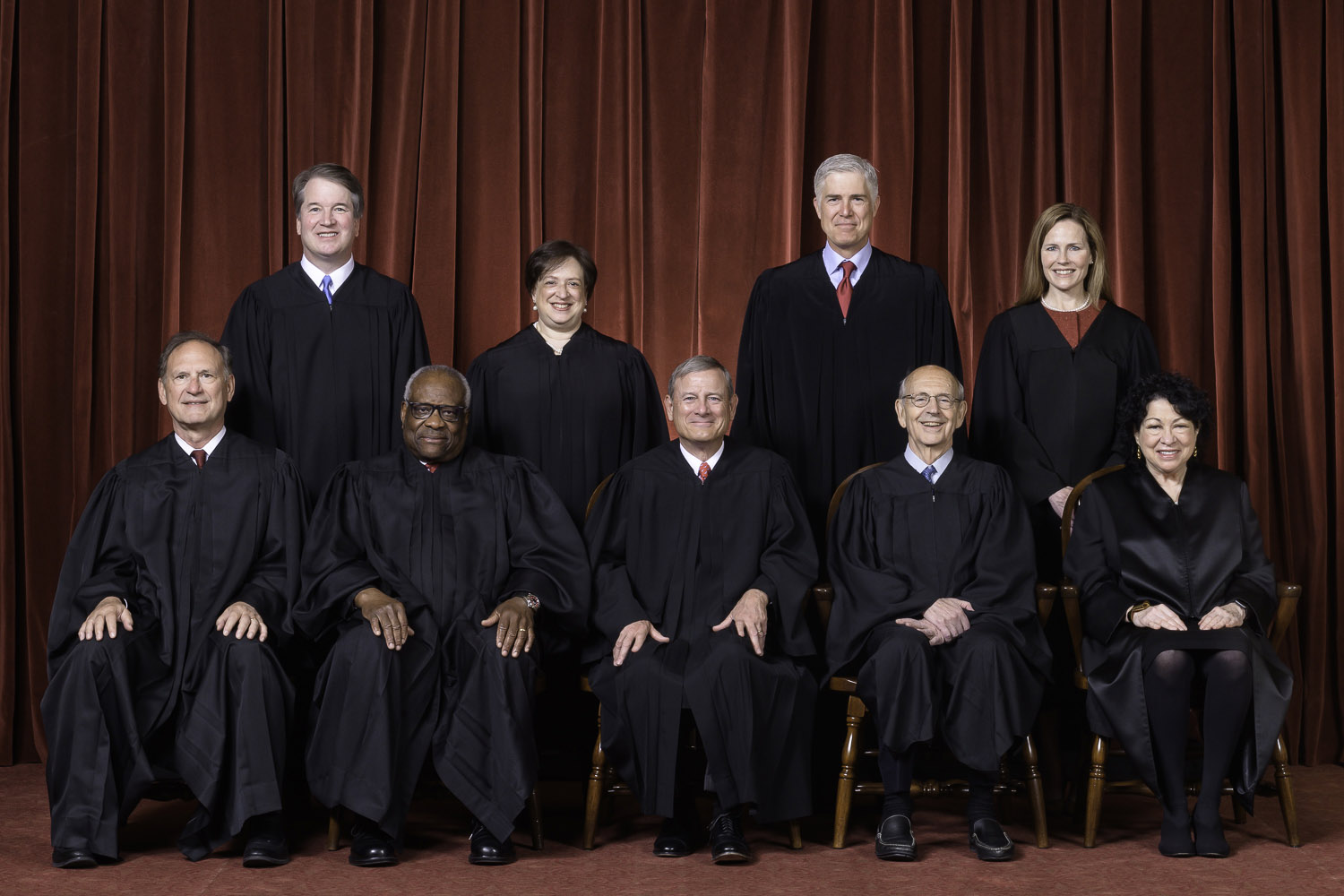
The Roberts Court in 2020. This court oversaw the landmark United States Supreme Court case Dobbs v. Jackson Women's Health Organization in 2022.

In May 2022, Politico published a leaked draft majority opinion, written by Justice Samuel Alito. It would overturn Roe and Casey by nullifying the specific privacy rights in question, eliminating federal involvement, and leaving the issue to be determined by the states. Through a statement made by the Chief Justice of the United States, John Roberts, the Court confirmed the document's authenticity but said that it was not a final decision or the Justice's final decision, which was expected by June or July.

The decision was issued on June 24, 2022, ruling 6–3 to reverse the lower court rulings; a more narrow 5–4 ruling overturned Roe and Casey. The majority opinion stated that abortion was not a constitutional right, and that states should have discretion in regulating abortion. The majority opinion, written by Alito, was substantially similar to the leaked draft. Chief Justice Roberts agreed with the judgment upholding the Mississippi law but did not join the majority in the opinion to overturn Roe and Casey.

=== Biotechnology ===
Due to the Christian right's views regarding ethics and to an extent due to negative views of eugenics common to most ideologies in North America, it has worked for the regulation and restriction of certain applications of biotechnology. In particular, the Christian right opposes therapeutic and reproductive human cloning, championing a 2005 United Nations ban on the practice, and human embryonic stem cell research, which involves the extraction of one or more cells from a human embryo. The Christian right supports research with adult stem cells, amniotic stem cells, and induced pluripotent stem cells which do not use cells from human embryos, as they view the harvesting of biological material from an embryo lacking the ability to give permission as an assault on a living being.

The Christian right also opposes euthanasia, and, in one highly publicized case, took an active role in seeking governmental intervention to prevent Terri Schiavo from being deprived of nutrition and hydration.

=== Opposition to drugs ===
The Christian right has historically supported the temperance movement, such as maintaining Sunday blue laws, adding alcohol packaging warning messages to bottles and limiting alcohol advertising. It has advocated for the prohibition of drugs and has opposed efforts to legalize marijuana. However, the Roman Catholic Church in Canada is in support of medical marijuana for therapeutic reasons.

=== Sex and sexuality ===
The modern roots of the Christian right's views on sexual matters were evident in the years 1950s–1960s, a period in which many conservative Christians in the United States viewed sexual promiscuity as not only excessive, but in fact as a threat to their ideal vision of the country. Beginning in the 1970s, conservative Christian protests against promiscuity began to surface, largely as a reaction to the "permissive Sixties" and changes in sexual behavior confirmed by Roe v. Wade and the LGBT rights movement. The Christian right proceeded to make sexuality issues a priority political cause.

Anita Bryant organized Save Our Children, a widespread campaign to oppose legislation prohibiting discrimination on the basis of sexual orientation in Miami-Dade County, Florida. The group argued that gay people were "recruiting" or "molesting children" in order to make them gay. Bryant said, "As a mother, I know that homosexuals cannot biologically reproduce children; therefore, they must recruit our children," and also said that "If gays are granted rights, next we'll have to give rights to prostitutes and to people who sleep with St. Bernards and to nail biters." The Bryant campaign achieved success in repealing some city anti-discrimination laws, and proposed other citizen initiatives such as a failed California ballot question designed to ban gay people or those who supported LGBT rights from holding public teaching jobs. Bryant's campaign attracted widespread opposition and boycotts which put her out of business.

From the late 1970s onwards, some conservative Christian organizations such as the Christian Broadcasting Network, Focus on the Family, Concerned Women for America, the American Family Association, and the Christian Coalition of America, along with right-wing Christian hate groups such as the Westboro Baptist Church, have been outspoken against LGBT rights. Late in 1979, a new religious revival among conservative Evangelical Protestants and Roman Catholics ushered in the Republican coalition politically aligned with the Christian right that would reign in the United States between the years 1970s and 1980s, becoming another obstacle for the progress of the LGBTQ rights movement. During the HIV/AIDS epidemic of the 1980s, LGBTQ communities were further stigmatized as they became the focus of mass hysteria and suffered isolation, marginalization and violence.

The Christian right champions itself as the "self-appointed conscience of American society". During the 1980s, the movement was largely dismissed by political pundits and mainstream religious leaders as "a collection of buffoonish has-beens". Later, it re-emerged, better organized and more focused, taking firm positions against abortion, pornography, sexual deviancy, and extreme feminism. Beginning around the first presidency of Donald Trump, Christian conservatives have largely refrained from engaging in debates about sexual morality.

Influential Christian right organizations at the forefront of the anti-gay rights movement in the United States include Focus on the Family, Family Research Council, and the Family Research Institute. An important stratagem in Christian right anti-gay politics is in its rejection of "the edicts of a Big Brother" state, allowing it to profit from "a general feeling of discontent and demoralization with government". As a result, the Christian right has endorsed smaller government, restricting its ability to arbitrate in disputes regarding values and traditions. In this context, gay rights laws have come to symbolize the government's allegedly unconstitutional "[interference] with individual freedom".

The central tenets of Focus on the Family and similar organizations, such as the Family Research Council, emphasise issues such as abortion and the necessity of gender roles. A number of organizations, including the New Christian Right, "have in various ways rejected liberal America in favor of the regulation of pornography, anti-abortion legislation, the criminalization of homosexuality, and the virtues of faithfulness and loyalty in sexual partnerships", according to sociologist Bryan S. Turner.

Some members of the Christian right view same-sex marriage as a central issue in the culture wars, more so than other gay rights issues and even more significantly than abortion. The legalization of same-sex marriage in Massachusetts in 2004 changed the Christian right, causing it to put its opposition to these marriages above most other issues. It also created previously unknown interracial and ecumenical coalitions, and stimulated new electoral activity in pastors and congregations.

=== Empathy ===
The approach to empathy is a controversial discourse within certain factions of the Christian right that emerged in the mid-2020s. Joe Rigney in his book The Sin of Empathy, distinguishes empathy from compassion: the former fully immerses in another's pain, potentially endorsing sin or falsehood to avoid seeming heartless. This view posits empathy as a tool for emotional manipulation, weaponized in culture wars over issues like abortion or LGBTQ+ rights, where it pressures affirmation of perceived wrongs.

== Criticism ==
Criticisms of the Christian right often come from Christians who believe Jesus's message was centered on social responsibility and social justice. Theologian Michael Lerner has summarized: "The unholy alliance of the Political Right and the Religious Right threatens to destroy the America we love. It also threatens to generate a revulsion against God and religion by identifying them with militarism, ecological irresponsibility, fundamentalist antagonism to science and rational thought, and insensitivity to the needs of the poor and the powerless."

Commentators such as Rob Schenck, Randall Balmer, and Charles M. Blow criticized the Christian right for its tolerance and embrace of Donald Trump during the 2016 presidential election despite Trump's failure to adhere to any of the principles advocated by the Christian right groups for decades. In a 2023 interview with NPR, Russell D. Moore stated that he had come to believe that Christianity was "in a crisis" after hearing multiple pastors speak of congregation members rejecting quotes from the Sermon on the Mount as "liberal talking points" and not backing down upon being informed of their source.

=== Interpretation of Christianity ===
One argument which questions the legitimacy of the Christian right posits that Jesus Christ may be considered a leftist on the modern political spectrum. Jesus's and Catholics' concern with the poor and feeding the hungry, among other things, are argued, by proponents of Christian leftism, to be core attributes of modern-day socialism and social justice. However, others contend that while Jesus's concern for the poor and hungry is virtuous and that individuals have a moral obligation to help others, the relationship between charity and the state should not be construed in the same manner.

According to Frank Newport of Gallup, "there are fewer Americans today who are both highly religious and liberal than there are Americans who are both highly religious and conservative." Newport also noted that 52% of white conservatives identify as "highly religious" while only 16% of white liberals identify as the same. However, African Americans, "the most religious of any major racial or ethnic group in the country", are "strongly oriented to voting Democratic". While observing that African-American Democrats are more religious than their white Democrat counterparts, Newport further noted, however, that African-American Democrats are "much more likely to be ideologically moderate or conservative."

Some criticize what they see as a politicization of Christianity because they say Jesus transcends political concepts.

Mikhail Gorbachev referred to Jesus as "the first Socialist".

=== Race and diversity ===
The Christian right has tried to recruit social conservatives in the black church. Prior to the 2016 United States presidential election, African-American Republican Ben Carson emerged as a leader of the Christian right. Other Christian African Americans who identify with conservatism are Supreme Court justice Clarence Thomas, rapper Kanye West, Alveda King, and pastor Tony Evans.

=== LGBT rights ===
Whilst the Christian right in the United States generally identifies with aspects of LGBT rights opposition, other Christian movements argue that the biblical texts only oppose specific types of divergent sexual behaviour, such as paederasty (i.e. sexual intercourse between boys and men). During the Trump administration, there was a growing push for religious liberty bills, aimed to exempt individuals and businesses from anti-discrimination laws intended to protect LGBT people, if they claimed that their actions were motivated by religious beliefs. Among the most powerful organizations that promoted anti-LGBT and anti-transgender legislation under the Trump administration is the Alliance Defending Freedom.

=== Use of dominionism labeling ===
Some social scientists have used the word "dominionism" to refer to adherence of dominion theology, as well as to the influence in the broader Christian Right of ideas inspired by Dominion Theology. Although such influence (particularly of Reconstructionism) has been described by many authors, full adherents to Reconstructionism are few and marginalized among conservative Christians.

In the early 1990s, sociologist Sara Diamond defined dominionism in her PhD dissertation as a movement that, while it includes Dominion Theology and Reconstructionism as subsets, is much broader in scope, extending to much of the Christian Right. She was followed by journalists who included Frederick Clarkson and Chris Hedges and others who have stressed the influence of Dominionist ideas on the Christian right.

The terms "dominionist" and "dominionism" are rarely used for self-description, and their usage has been attacked from right-leaning quarters. Stanley Kurtz labeled it "conspiratorial nonsense", "political paranoia", and "guilt by association", and decried Hedges' "vague characterizations" that allow him to "paint a highly questionable picture of a virtually faceless and nameless 'Dominionist' Christian mass." Kurtz also complained about a perceived link between average Christian evangelicals and extremism such as Christian Reconstructionism:

The notion that conservative Christians want to reinstitute slavery and rule by genocide is not just crazy, it's downright dangerous. The most disturbing part of the Harper's cover story (the one by Chris Hedges) was the attempt to link Christian conservatives with Hitler and fascism. Once we acknowledge the similarity between conservative Christians and fascists, Hedges appears to suggest, we can confront Christian evil by setting aside "the old polite rules of democracy." So wild conspiracy theories and visions of genocide are really excuses for the Left to disregard the rules of democracy and defeat conservative Christians – by any means necessary.

Lisa Miller of Newsweek said that many warnings about "dominionism" are "paranoid" and she also said that "the word creates a siege mentality in which 'we' need to guard against 'them.'" Ross Douthat of The New York Times noted that "many of the people that writers like Diamond and others describe as 'dominionists' would disavow the label, many definitions of dominionism conflate several very different Christian political theologies, and there's a lively debate about whether the term is even useful at all." According to Joe Carter of First Things, "the term was coined in the 1980s by Diamond and is never used outside liberal blogs and websites. No reputable scholars use the term for it is a meaningless neologism that Diamond concocted for her dissertation", while Jeremy Pierce of First Things coined the word "dominionismist" to describe those who promote the idea that there is a dominionist conspiracy.

Another criticism has focused on the proper use of the term. Berlet wrote that "some critics of the Christian Right have stretched the term dominionism past its breaking point", and argued that, rather than labeling conservatives as extremists, it would be better to "talk to these people" and "engage them". Sara Diamond wrote that "[l]iberals' writing about the Christian Right's take-over plans has generally taken the form of conspiracy theory", and argued that instead one should "analyze the subtle ways" that ideas like Dominionism "take hold within movements and why."

Dan Olinger, a professor at the fundamentalist Bob Jones University in Greenville, South Carolina, said, "We want to be good citizens and participants, but we're not really interested in using the iron fist of the law to compel people to do everything Christians should do." Bob Marcaurelle, interim pastor at Mountain Springs Baptist Church in Piedmont, said the Middle Ages were proof enough that Christian ruling groups are almost always corrupted by power. "When Christianity becomes the government, the question is whose Christianity?" Marcaurelle asked.

== Movements outside the United States ==
While the Christian right is a strong movement in the United States, it also has a presence in Canada. Alan Curtis suggests that the American Christian right "is a phenomenon that is very hard for Europeans to understand." Robin Pettitt, a professor at Kingston University London, states, however, that like the Christian right in the US, Christian Democratic movements in Europe and Latin America are "equally driven by the debate over the role of the state and the church in political, social and moral life."

=== Australia ===
In Australia, the Christian right draws from both Catholics and Protestants. Historically, the first Christian right party was the Democratic Labor Party. The Democratic Labor Party was formed in 1955 as a split from the Australian Labor Party (ALP). In Victoria, and New South Wales, state executive members, parliamentarians and branch members associated with the Industrial Groups or B. A. Santamaria and "The Movement" (and therefore strongly identified with Roman Catholicism) were expelled from the party, and formed the Democratic Labor Party (DLP). Later in 1957, a similar split occurred in Queensland, with the resulting group subsequently joining the DLP. The party also had sitting members from Tasmania and New South Wales at various times, though it was much stronger in the former mentioned states. The goals of the party were anti communism, the decentralization of industry, population, administration and ownership. The party decided in its view that the ALP was filled with communists, and that it would preference the ruling conservative Liberal and Country parties over the ALP.

The DLP heavily lost ground in the federal election of 1974 that saw its primary vote cut by nearly two-thirds, and the election of an ALP government. The DLP never regained its previous support in subsequent elections and formally disbanded in 1978, but a small group within the party refused to accept this decision and created a small, reformed successor party (now the Democratic Labour Party). Though his party was effectively gone, Santamaria and his National Civic Council (NCC) took a strong diametrically opposed stance to dominant Third Way/neoliberal/New Right tendencies within both the ALP and Liberal parties throughout the 1980s and early 1990s.

The B. A Santamaria and the Democratic Labor party produced many alumni who became the base of the Christian right in Australia. In Liberal party, these were Tony Abbott and Kevin Andrews. Outside the Liberal party, conservative commentators such as Greg Sheridan and Gerrard Henderson also had links to Santamaria. Within the Australian Labor Party (ALP), this alumni can be found in the Shop, Distributive and Allied Employees Association (SDA), which de-affiliated from the ALP with the industrial Groups in the 1950s, and then re-affiliated in the 1980s. The SDA opposed gay marriage and abortion, which were some reasons for workers to form another competing union. Tony Burke, who opposed euthanasia, came from the SDA. Currently, the NCC functions as a minority organization within the Christian Right.

The more Protestant strands of the Christian Right have been far more diverse. Fundamentalist Christianity directly inspired Fred Nile and his parties. Nile in 1967–68 was assistant director of the Billy Graham Crusade in Sydney. The Christian Democratic Party (initially known as the "Call to Australia" party) is on the strongly religious conservative end of the Australian political spectrum, promoting social conservatism, opposing gay rights and abortion. It gained 9.1% of the vote in the New South Wales (NSW) state election of 1981, Its support base has generally been restricted to NSW and Western Australia, where it usually gains between 2–4% of votes, with its support being minuscule in other states. The party started to fall apart in 2019 when the moderate faction member, Paul Green, lost his seat, and when a faction of younger people attempted to dismiss the governing board. Whilst this failed, it opened up a rift between the traditional party factions that led to prolonged legal disputes and the party winding up in 2022. Fred Nile would quickly join a new party.

The Family First Party is a former political party which was linked with Pentecostal Church and other smaller Christian denominations, and was also identified with the strongly religious conservative end of the Australian political spectrum. It has had one or two members in the SA parliament since 2002, and in 2004 also managed to elect a Victorian senator. Its electoral support is small, with the largest constituencies being South Australia (4–6%), and Victoria (around 4%). Family First generally receives lower support in national elections than in state elections. Family First was merged with the Australian Conservatives Party in 2017.

Outside of the Catholic links to B.A. Santamaria and the minor Protestant parties, some party members of the Liberal and National Party Coalition and the Australian Labor Party also support some of the values of the Christian right on abortion and gay rights. The Australian Christian Lobby argues for opposition to same-sex marriage in state and federal politics.

=== Brazil ===
In Brazil, the evangelical caucus have a great influence at the parliament and in the society in general. The bloc promotes strong socially conservative positions, like opposition to abortion, LGBT rights, marijuana legalization, sexual and gender education at schools and support to decrease of age of defense of infancy. Except for left-wing and far-left parties with strong social progressive beliefs like Workers' Party or Socialism and Liberty Party, Christian conservatives can be found in all political parties of Brazil, but nevertheless they are more common associated with parties like Social Democratic Party, Democratas, PSL, Social Christian Party, Brazilian Republican Party, Patriota and in the Party of the Republic. In 2016, Marcelo Crivella, a licensed pentecostal pastor from the Universal Church of the Kingdom of God, won in a runoff the election to mayor of Rio de Janeiro, the second biggest city in Brazil, with the Brazilian Republican Party, making for the first time an evangelical bloc member mayor of a big city in Brazil. In 2018, Jair Bolsonaro was elected president with massive support of conservative Catholics, Charismatics, Evangelicals and Pentecostals; Another candidate, Cabo Daciolo, from Patriota, attracted much attention from media and public in general, despite a lower votation. Both had a right-wing populist, Christian nationalist program, but Bolsonaro was near to a national conservative and economic liberal one, contrasting with an Ultranationalist, theocratic and protectionist style of Daciolo.

=== Canada ===
Religion has been a key factor in Canadian politics since well before the Canadian Confederation was established in 1867, when the Conservatives were the party of traditionalist Catholics and Anglicans and the Liberals were the party of Protestant dissenters and anti-clerical Catholics. This pattern largely remained until the mid-twentieth century when a new division emerged between the Christian left (represented by the Social Gospel philosophy and ecumenicism) and the Christian right (represented by fundamentalism and biblical literalism). The Christian left (along with the secular and anti-religious left) became supporters of the New Democratic Party while the right moved to the Social Credit Party, especially in Western Canada, and to a lesser extent the Progressive Conservatives.

The Social Credit Party, founded in 1935, represented a major change in Canadian religious politics. Until that time, fundamentalists had shunned politics as "worldly", and a distraction from the proper practice of religion. However, the new party was founded by fundamentalist radio preacher and Bible school teacher William Aberhart or "Bible Bill". Aberhart mixed his own interpretation of scripture and prophecy with the monetary reform theories of social credit to create a movement that swept across Alberta, winning the provincial election of 1935 in a landslide. Aberhart and his disciple Ernest Manning then governed the province for the next forty years, several times trying to expand into the rest of Canada

In 1987, Manning's son, Preston Manning, founded the new Reform Party of Canada, which soon became the main party of the religious right. It won majorities of the seats in Western Canada in repeated elections, but was unable to break through in Eastern Canada, though it became the official opposition from 1997 to 2003 (Reform was renamed the Canadian Alliance in 2000). In 2003 the Canadian Alliance and the Progressive Conservatives merged to create the Conservative Party of Canada, led by Stephen Harper, a member of the Christian and Missionary Alliance, who went on to become prime minister in 2006.

The Canadian Charter of Rights and Freedoms, introduced by the patriation of the Canadian Constitution in 1982, has been controversial within the Christian right in Canada. Although this Charter entrenches rights and freedoms (such as the freedom of religion) that are central in the belief systems of the Christian right, it has also been interpreted by the Supreme Court of Canada to strike down many laws supported by the Christian right. In 1982, the Supreme Court struck down Canada's Lords' Day Act, which required many stored to be closed on Sundays, as an infringement the freedom of conscience and religion. Abortion, partly decriminalized in 1969 by an act of Parliament, was completely decriminalized after the two R. v. Morgentaler cases (in 1988 and in 1993). Parliament attempted to pass a new law governing abortion in 1993, but this legislation failed after a tie vote in the Senate. A series of provincial superior court decisions which legalized same-sex marriage led the federal government to introduce legislation that legalized same-sex marriage in all of Canada. Before he took office, former Conservative prime minister Stephen Harper stated that he would hold a free vote on the issue, and declared the issue closed after it was voted down in the House of Commons in 2006.

In 2013, the Supreme Court struck down Canada's prostitution law in Canada v Bedford, prompting the Stephen Harper government to introduce a new prostitution law fashioned after the Nordic Model. In 2015, the Supreme Court struck down Canada's prohibition on euthanasia in Carter v Canada, again leading Parliament to pass a new law governing euthanasia. The Christian right has been critical of all these judicial decisions and have generally been the greatest advocates for the stringent laws against abortion, same-sex marriage, prostitution, and euthanasia, though in differing degrees. For instance, the Christian right in Canada is strongly and vocally organized on the topic of abortion, but criticism of same-sex marriage is far more seldom. In 2021 the Canadian government passed Bill C-4, banning conversion therapy nationwide, which received opposition from the Christian Right and Conservative members of parliament. Christian Pastors altered their preaching schedules to criticize and discuss this new law.

=== The Caribbean, Latin America, and Sub-Saharan Africa ===
Christian right politics in the Caribbean, Latin America, and Sub-Saharan Africa is strongly connected with the growing propagation of the Evangelical-Pentecostal movement in the Global South and Third World countries. Roman Catholics in the Caribbean, Latin America, and Sub-Saharan Africa, despite being normally socially conservative, tend to be more left-wing in economics due to the traditional teachings of the Catholic social doctrine. Evangelical-Pentecostal Christians, on the other hand, are mostly from the neo-Pentecostal movement, and thus believers in the Prosperity theology that justifies most of their neoliberal economic ideas. They are also strongly socially conservative, even for Latin American standards.

=== Mexico ===
In Mexico, the interests of the Christian right are represented by different political organisations and civil associations. The most notable case is the National Action Party, a conservative party aligned with Christian Democratic ideas, notably influenced by the Social teaching of the Catholic Church, and which has held the presidency of Mexico twice. The party's platform states strong opposition to abortion, same-sex marriage and the legalisation of drugs, among many other conservative policies. In addition, prominent figures in the party have been linked to Catholic Church organisations. The evangelical caucus, albeit for a relatively short time, was represented by the Social Encounter Party and the Solidarity Encounter Party, the latter being the successor to the former. Both parties were founded by Hugo Eric Flores, who according to some sources was an evangelical minister before entering politics. Initially statewide for Baja California, Social Encounter came to govern that state in coalition with the National Action Party. The party would later be officialised as a political party at the federal level. Other organisations and associations adhering to the ideals of the Christian right include the Frente Nacional por la Familia, the Organización del Bien Común, colloquially known as El Yunque and with close ties to the PAN, and the Legionaries of Christ, a Roman Catholic clerical religious order of priests and candidates for the priesthood established in Mexico.

=== Netherlands ===
In the Netherlands, Calvinist Protestants have long had their own political parties, now called the Reformed Political Party (SGP) on the right, and the ChristianUnion (CU) in the center. For generations they operated their own newspapers and broadcasting association. The SGP has about 28,000 members, and three out of 150 members of the Dutch parliament's lower house. It has always been in opposition to the government.

=== Northern Ireland ===
In Northern Ireland, Ian Paisley led a Protestant fundamentalist party, the Democratic Unionist Party, which had a considerable influence on the province's culture. For a time after the 2017 United Kingdom general election, the DUP provided confidence and supply to the governing Conservative Party, although this agreement provoked concern from socially liberal elements of the party about possible DUP influence on social policy. Although there is no evidence this occurred. Karen Armstrong has mentioned British evangelical leader Colin Urquhart as advocating positions similar to the Christian Right.

=== Other countries ===
In Fiji, Sodelpa is a conservative, nationalist party which seeks to make Christianity the state religion, while the constitution makes Fiji a secular republic. Following the 2014 general election, Sodelpa is the main opposition party in Parliament.

In Hungary, the ruling national-conservative party Fidesz can also be considered to be a party of the Christian right. Viktor Orbán is known for his use of conservative Christian values against immigration and the rise of Islam in Europe.

In the Philippines, due to Spanish colonization, and the introduction of the Catholic Church, religious conservatism has a strong influence on national policies. Some have argued that the U.S. Christian right may have roots in the Philippines.

In Poland, the Roman Catholic national-conservative party Law and Justice can be considered to be a party of the Christian right.

In Russia, the United Russia has collaborated closely with the Russian Orthodox Church, boosting the Kremlin's appeal to social conservatives.

In Scandinavia, the Faroe Island's Centre Party is a bible-oriented fundamentalist party with about 4% of the vote. However, the Norwegian Christian People's Party, the Swedish Christian Democrats and Danish Christian Democrats are less religiously orthodox and are similar to mainstream European Christian Democracy.

In Switzerland, Federal Democratic Union is a small conservative Protestant party with about 1% of the vote.

== Associated minor political parties ==
Some minor political parties have formed as vehicles for Christian right activists:

- Australian Christians (Australia)
- Christian Democratic Party (Australia)
- Christian Party of Austria (Austria)
- Botswana Movement for Democracy (Botswana)
- We Believe (Bolivia)
- Alliance for Brazil (Brazil)
- Patriota (Brazil)
- Christian Heritage Party (Canada)
- National Restoration Party (Costa Rica)
- Christian Democratic People's Party (Hungary)
- Kataeb Party (Lebanon)
- Christian Liberal Party (South Korea)
- Christian Values Party (Sweden)
- Katipunan ng Demokratikong Pilipino (Philippines)
- Swiss People's Party (Switzerland)
- Reformed Political Party (Netherlands)
- Nicaraguan Party of the Christian Path (Nicaragua)
- The Christians (Norway)
- Law and Justice (Poland)
- Alliance for the Union of Romanians (Romania)
- Christian Party (United Kingdom)
- Christian People's Alliance (United Kingdom)
- Indian National Christian Party (India)
- Christian Liberty Party (United States)
- American Solidarity Party (United States)
- Constitution Party (United States)
- Prohibition Party (United States)
- Democratic Unionist Party (United Kingdom)
- Traditional Unionist Voice (United Kingdom)
- Christian Conservative Party, a political party in Norway
- Conservative Christian Party – BPF, a political party in Belarus

=== Groups ===
- Roman Catholic Church (social, moral, and cultural issues)
  - Traditionalist Catholicism
- Southern Baptist Convention
- Assemblies of God
- Presbyterian Church in America
- Lutheran Church–Missouri Synod and Wisconsin Evangelical Lutheran Synod
- Continuing Anglicans
- Free Methodist Church and Global Methodist Church
- Other denominations of conservative evangelicalism
- The Church of Jesus Christ of Latter-day Saints
- Unification Church of the United States

== See also ==
- Christian fascism
- Christian fundamentalism
- Christian libertarianism
- Christian revival
- Christianity and politics
- Christian values
- Independent Baptist
- Liberty Institute
- Manhattan Declaration: A Call of Christian Conscience
- Religion and authoritarianism
- Theonomy
