= Generation Joshua =

American Christian youth organization

- Generation Joshua logo
- Named after: Joshua
- Formation: 2003
- Founder: Michael Farris, Mike Smith
- Dissolved: 2025
- Headquarters: One Patrick Henry Circle; Purcellville, Virginia
- Executive Director: Joel Grewe
- Director: Jeremiah Lorrig
- Parent organization: Home School Legal Defense Association
- Website: generationjoshua.org

Generation Joshua, often called "GenJ" by its members, was an American Christian fundamentalist youth organization founded in 2003 that aimed to encourage youth participation in government, civics, and politics toward conservative Christian values. GenJ was a division of the Home School Legal Defense Association, which is a non-profit 501(c)4 organization based in Purcellville, Virginia. The organization was founded by Michael Farris and Mike Smith and was located on the campus of Patrick Henry College.

GenJ participants, composed of mostly homeschooled teenagers, campaigned for conservative Republican candidates who support homeschooling, and who oppose abortion and LGBT rights. During election years, GenJ students were often sent to areas where voter outreach and registration could play a significant role. Their volunteer work helped some of their preferred candidates win elections. Prominent former members of GenJ include Madison Cawthorn, who was in the United States House of Representatives for one term.

== History ==
=== Founding ===
Generation Joshua, also known as GenJ, was founded in December 2003 as a web-based program by its parent organization, the Home School Legal Defense Association (HSLDA). The HSLDA is a non-profit 501(c)4 organization primarily composed of Christian fundamentalists who homeschool their children, although it is open to students who attend traditional schools. The HSLDA was founded by attorneys Mike Smith and author Michael Farris, a protégé of Tim LaHaye and founder of Patrick Henry College (PHC) where GenJ is headquartered. The group's name comes from the Biblical story of Joshua, who succeeded Moses as leader of the Israelites when they conquered Canaan.

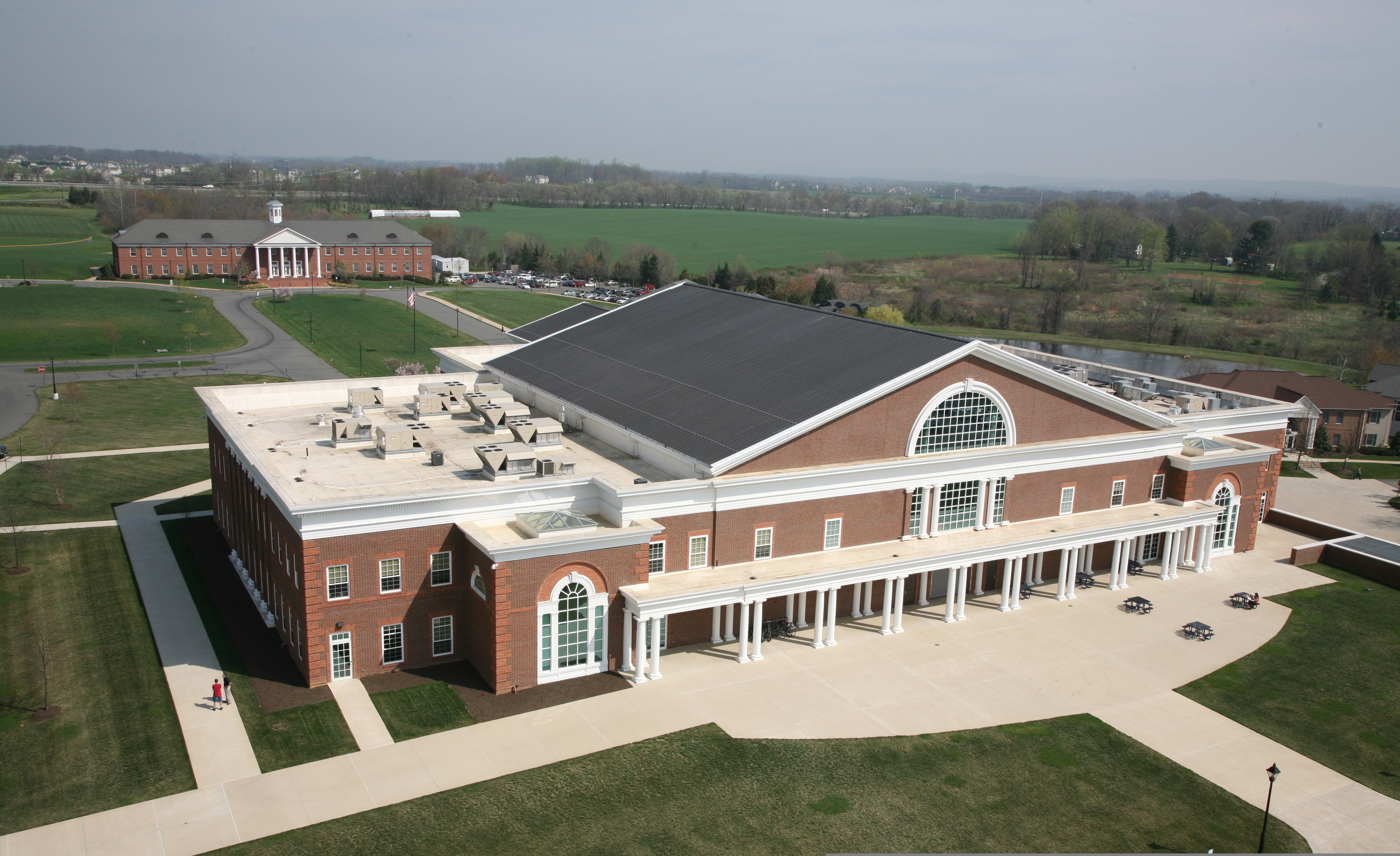
Generation Joshua was headquartered on the campus of Patrick Henry College.

In February 2004, Farris sent letters to HSLDA families encouraging them to enroll their children into GenJ, describing it as a hands-on program that would offer civic lessons, help conservative candidates win elections, and encourage conservative church members to vote. PHC and GenJ share the same philosophy of fueling "a vision in young people to help America return to her Judeo-Christian foundations" which includes involving young people in conservative politics. GenJ was founded after PHC students campaigned during local and state elections in Virginia, including Mark Earley's unsuccessful bid in the gubernatorial race. When GenJ was launched, Farris said, "We believe that some day homeschooled young people will help reverse Roe v. Wade [and] stop same-sex marriage" and "Home-school teens could become one of the most powerful forces in American politics, rivaling the labor unions in effectiveness."

The primary goal in founding GenJ was to send thousands of homeschooled teenagers to campaign in tightly-contested political races across the country. The groups, called Student Action Teams, are composed of 25 to 200 youths and campaign for candidates who support homeschooling, the anti-abortion movement, and other socially conservative issues. One of the first campaigns GenJ assisted with was for a 2004 Republican primary candidate in North Carolina's 5th congressional district. Although their candidate was unsuccessful, then-director Ned Ryun, who worked as a speechwriter for President George W. Bush, said, "This is the first real attempt to get them organized in a cohesive effort in the right direction" and "It's no secret that homeschoolers are excellent grass-roots workers." Ryun also stated GenJ would be active in the upcoming national elections. GenJ coordinated with Republican Party officials that year, spending around $60,000 on the hundreds of homeschooled kids that acted as campaign volunteers.

=== Early years ===
During the next few years, Farris wrote the book, The Joshua Generation: Restoring the Heritage of Christian Leadership, while GenJ expanded to all 50 states and continued to assist with local and national election campaigns, with many of their candidates being successful. Students would study in the morning, campaign in the afternoon, and do homework in the evening. In addition to working on political campaigns, assisting with voter registration drives, and visiting state legislators, students could take one of ten civics courses, join the GenJ Book Club, attend iGovern leadership camps, and participate in the Benjamin Rush Awards Program, whereby they could earn points for completing various projects. The winner of the competition would receive a scholarship to PHC and an all-expense paid trip to Washington, D.C.

GenJ played a large role in helping Republicans win close races in the 2006 and 2008 elections. Then-Representative Michele Bachmann, who homeschooled her five children and received praise by HSLDA for her support of the Family Education Freedom Act, credited GenJ with her win in 2008. She addressed GenJ's national conference in Washington, D.C., the following year and after receiving further help from the group in 2010, Bachmann said GenJ volunteers "help us become confident that we'll reach more people and meet our voter contact goals before the polls close on Election Day." Mike Huckabee's surprise second place in the 2007 Ames straw poll was credited to his support from Farris and GenJ. Ryun, however, disagreed with GenJ's endorsement of Huckabee, and abruptly resigned from his post as director in the summer of 2007. He attributed his resignation to lack of freedom of thought and conscience, believing that "[d]issent is not allowed in Mike Farris' world".

In 2008, then-presidential candidate Barack Obama started an outreach program called the Joshua Generation that was geared towards young evangelical voters. Farris claimed that this was an intentional act by the Obama campaign officials to confuse voters, going on to state the following: "This is an improper invasion of our trademark and we’ve retained legal counsel to notify the Obama campaign to stop this."

=== 2010s ===
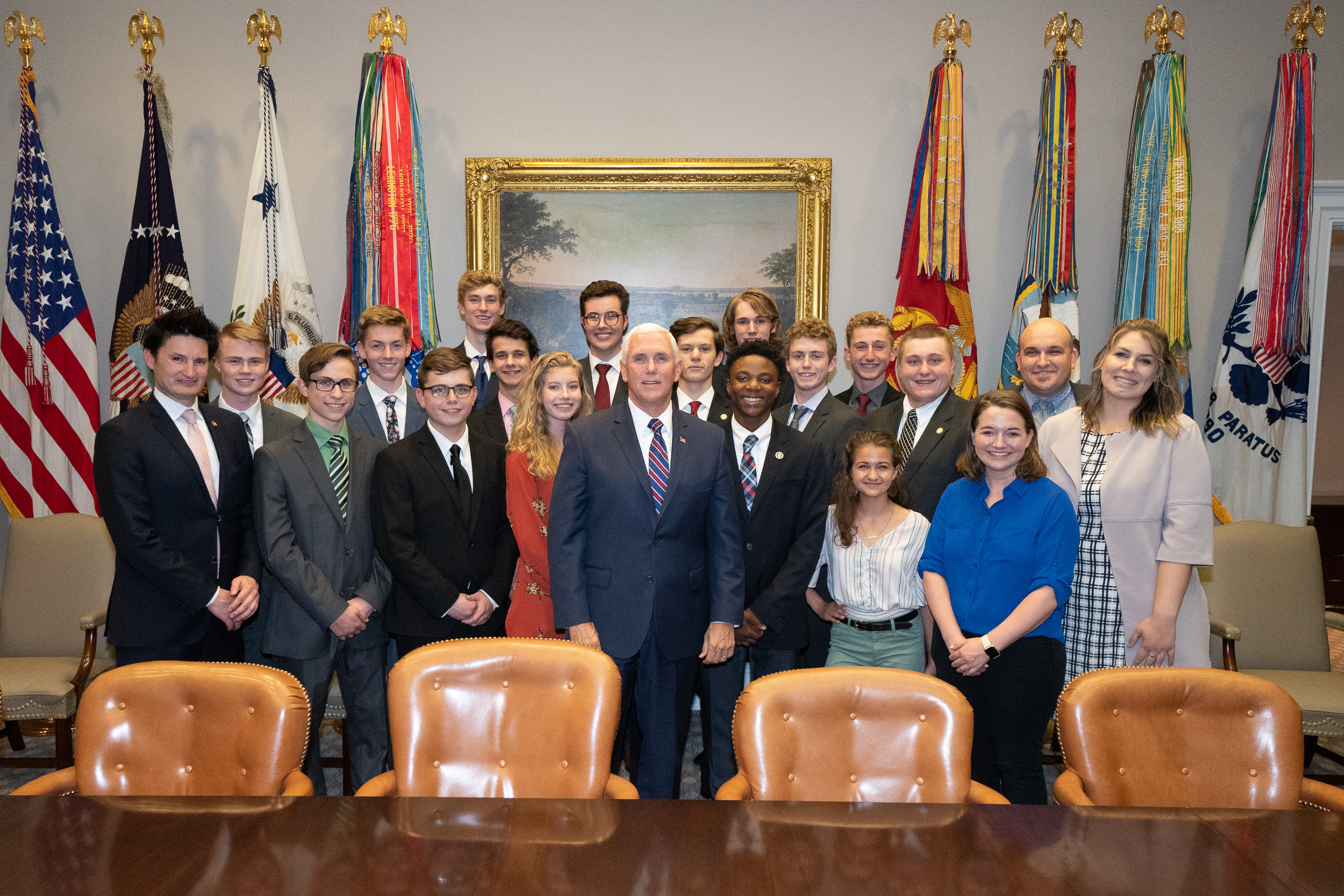
Vice President Mike Pence with Generation Joshua students at the White House in 2019

GenJ students continued working in local and national campaigns during the 2010s. A few days before the 2013 Virginia gubernatorial election, the Republican Party of Virginia Inc. committee paid $79,500 to HSLDA's state political action committee. At the time, GenJ was posting support on its Facebook page for Republican candidate Ken Cuccinelli.

During the 2016 United States Senate elections, GenJ students were very active in several close campaigns, helping Marco Rubio, Pat Toomey, Roy Blunt, and Ron Johnson win their races. The candidates' campaigns covered the costs of traveling, lodging, and food for GenJ volunteers. In exchange, the youths were given addresses to visit and phone numbers to call to increase voter participation. Then-director Joel Grewe said potential voters are more open to speaking with teenagers. During the final days of the 2016 election, GenJ students contacted 680,235 voters in nine states. After winning his election, Blunt said "The Generation Joshua volunteers did a great job throughout the state talking to Missourians about issues that matter to them."

The following year Farris became the CEO of Alliance Defending Freedom, a conservative Christian legal advocacy group. He later played a role in attempts to overturn the 2020 United States presidential election on behalf of Donald Trump.

=== 2020s ===
In the 2020 United States House of Representatives elections, former GenJ member Madison Cawthorn was elected to Congress. He was homeschooled and attended PHC for one semester before dropping out. He became a proponent of conservative college students dropping out unless they were studying to be a lawyer, doctor, or engineer. Cawthorn served one term in Congress before losing the 2022 Republican primary. That year Ted Budd, who homeschools his children, won the Senate election in North Carolina with assistance from 86 GenJ volunteers, who contacted around 120,000 voters, almost the same amount by which Budd won the election.

In 2023, a group of Virginia legislators proposed a resolution to commend GenJ for its 20th anniversary. The resolution was sponsored by Delegates Karen Greenhalgh and Dave LaRock, and State Senators Bill DeSteph, John Cosgrove, and Bryce Reeves. It was noted GenJ had over 28,000 students participate in its programs since 2003, that it was beneficial to its students during the COVID-19 pandemic, and that it "aspires to establish a local GenJ Club in every congressional district in the nation to allow the organization to more fully achieve its mission and objectives".

In the 2023 documentary series Shiny Happy People: Duggar Family Secrets, which focused on the Duggar family, Christian homeschooling, the Institute in Basic Life Principles and its founder Bill Gothard, GenJ was discussed. It was noted former members have interned or been hired by politicians, judges, and White House officials. One former GenJ leader interviewed for the documentary also explained the Quiverfull theological position, whereby married couples do not use any form of birth control in order to have large families that will "take America back for Christ."

In November 2025 a statement released by Farris and HSLDA president Jim Mason stated the HSLDA Board and leadership had decided to permanently shut down the GenJ program. The reason cited for this decision is fiscal responsibility to the main mission of HSLDA. In December 2025, the former staff of GenJ launched a new organization, Project Pathfinder. It will be continuing some of GenJ's core programs, including government simulations and their summer camp in Virginia.

== See also ==
- Homeschooling in the United States
- National Christian Forensics and Communications Association
