= Jack Haye =

American banker and academic administrator

3rd President of Patrick Henry College
- Incumbent
- Assumed office 2015
- Preceded by: Graham Walker

Personal details
- Children: 8
- Education: Baylor University (BS); Arizona State University (MBA)

Jack Haye is an American banker and academic administrator serving as the third president of Patrick Henry College, a Christian liberal arts school in Purcellville, Virginia.

== Education ==
Haye earned a bachelor's degree from Baylor University and Master of Business Administration in accounting from the American Graduate School of International Management.

== Career ==
Prior to assuming his role at Patrick Henry College, Haye worked in the banking industry. After time at Bank of America, Haye worked at Wells Fargo for 20 years, serving as Senior Vice President of Corporate Lending and Executive Vice President and National Manager of Treasury Management Consulting. He also served on the board of directors of the Baylor University School of Music. In 1998, Haye became a founding trustee of Patrick Henry College. From 2012 to 2015, he served as the executive pastor at the First Baptist Church of McKinney in Dallas, Texas. Haye was selected to serve as president of Patrick Henry College in 2015, succeeding Graham Walker.

== Personal life ==
Haye and his wife have eight children.
