= Home School Legal Defense Association =

American political organization

- "HSLDA: Advocates for homeschooling"
- Abbreviation: HSLDA
- Formation: March 28, 1983; 43 years ago
- Founder: Michael Farris and J. Michael Smith
- Type: Advocacy organization
- Legal status: 501(c)(3) nonprofit
- Purpose: Homeschool advocacy
- Location: Purcellville, Virginia
- Coordinates: 39.140479°N 77.690248°W
- President: Jim Mason
- Publication: Home School Court Report (quarterly); Home School Heartbeat (daily, audio)
- Website: hslda.org

The Home School Legal Defense Association (HSLDA) is an American political organization that seeks to advance the freedom of parents to homeschool their children. HSLDA describes itself as a "Christian organization."

HSLDA is organized as a 501(c)(3) nonprofit organization, located in Purcellville, Virginia, which is also the home of Patrick Henry College, founded by Michael Farris in 2000. Farris was also CEO of the conservative Christian legal organization Alliance Defending Freedom from 2017 to 2022.

== History ==
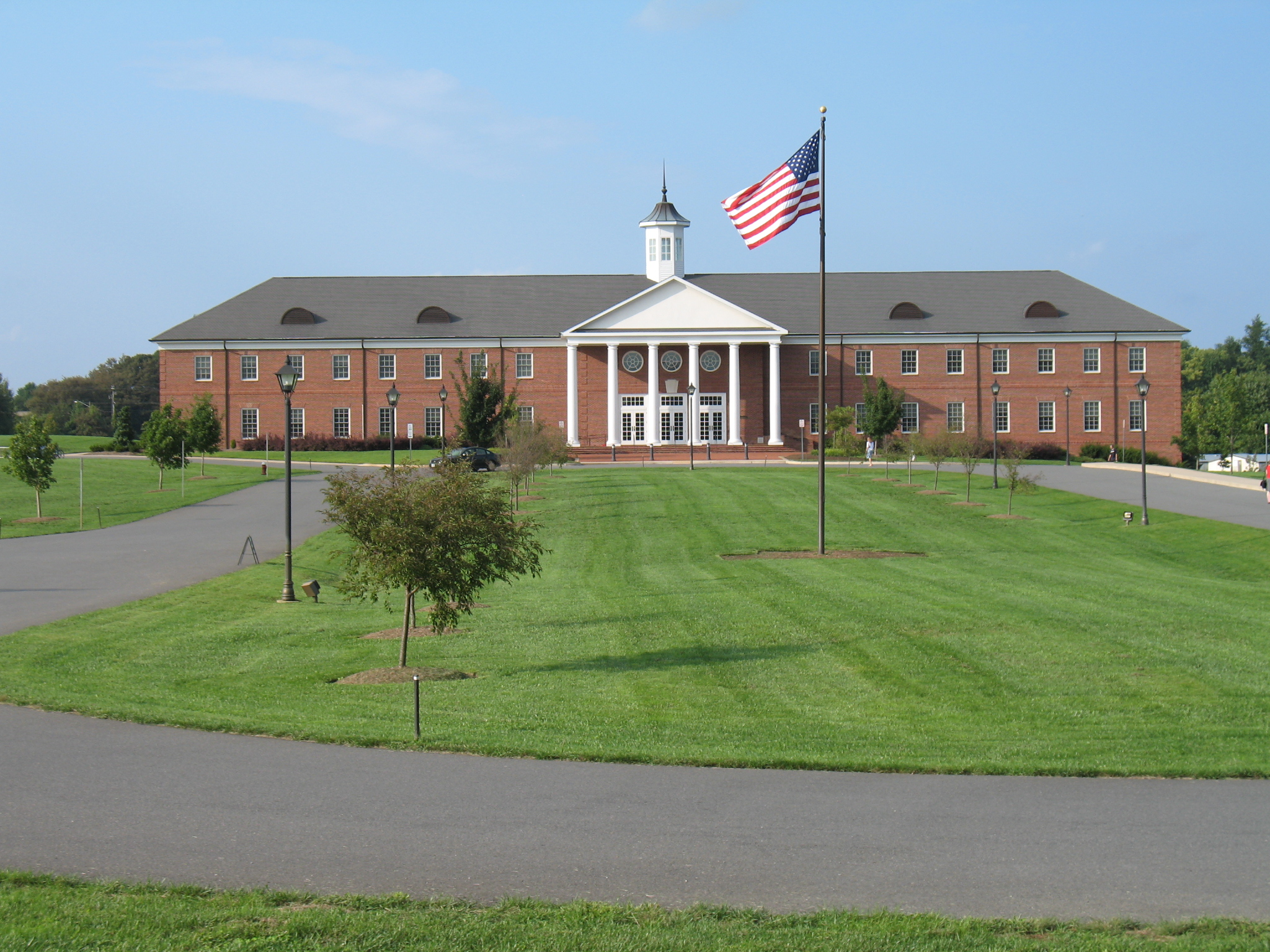
Founders Hall and Patrick Henry Circle

HSLDA was founded by Michael Farris in 1983 for the purpose of defending homeschooling parents. At that time, homeschooling was not specifically legal in most of the states of the U.S. under compulsory schooling laws. Those who practiced homeschooling were often harassed or prosecuted. Through a combination of legal action and legislative lobbying, HSLDA played a large part in the legalization of homeschooling throughout the U.S.

A high point of HSLDA's existence was its central role in the 1994 defeat of language in bill H.R. 6. This bill would have required all teachers in the U.S., potentially including home educators, to have teacher certification. HSLDA used their grassroots lobbying system in each of the 50 states which coordinated members to contact their legislators about pending legislation. Their members overloaded the phone switchboards at Capitol Hill, and through the efforts of their members and other organizations, the bill was amended to remove the problematic language. While HSLDA is proud of this, some homeschoolers disagreed. As noted by Mark Hegener, then publisher of Home Education Magazine, "HSLDA used homeschooling families to jump strongly on the Federal side of the scale of State's rights vs. Federal rights. For homeschoolers this means someday, some poor federal bureaucrat is going to be stuck with the task of writing regulations which define homeschooling."

HSLDA's speech and debate league broke off to form the National Christian Forensics and Communications Association in 2001. That same year, Patrick Henry College was founded by Michael Farris, who was the college's president until 2006. Today, HSLDA's 80,000+ members receive free legal assistance if they are contacted by public school officials, or need legal help in relation to their rights to homeschool.

HSLDA has been criticized, from both inside and outside the larger homeschooling movement, for its ties to the Christian Right and its advocacy for various conservative political and religious causes, some of which are unrelated to homeschooling.

== Other HSLDA programs ==
=== Generation Joshua ===
In 2003, HSLDA, feeling a need to educate youth in civics and politics, founded Generation Joshua. Generation Joshua (often abbreviated as "Gen J" by its members,) is an American Conservative Christian youth organization that aims to encourage the involvement of 11- to 19-year-olds in politics. Its members, which number 6,000 as of 2006, participate in civics education, over 60 clubs, student action teams, voter registration drives, and "Benjamin Rush" Awards, which offer members a chance to earn a trip to Washington, D.C., amongst other things.

On November 20, 2025, a statement was released by Jim Mason (president of HSLDA) and Michael Farris (founder of HSLDA) stating that the HSLDA Board and leadership had decided to permanently shut down the Generation Joshua program. The reason cited for the decision was fiscal responsibility to the main mission of HSLDA.

=== HSLDA Online Academy ===
HSLDA and Patrick Henry College founded HSLDA Online Academy in 2009 to provide online Christian courses to homeschool families. Originally named Patrick Henry College Preparatory Academy, HSLDA Online Academy has expanded beyond college preparatory courses and now offers an array of high school classes online, including English & writing, mathematics, social studies, and foreign languages.

=== Publications ===
- The HSLDA publishes a bimonthly magazine which is mailed to all of its members.
- The HSLDA published Constitutional Law for Enlightened Citizens by Michael P. Farris.

=== HSLDA Compassion ===
HSLDA Compassion provides "Assistance to needy home schooling families".

=== NCFCA ===
The National Christian Forensics and Communications Association, or NCFCA, is a speech and debate league for homeschooled students in the United States, established in 2001 after outgrowing HSLDA, which had been running the league since it was originally established in 1995. NCFCA is now organized under its own board of directors with regional and state leadership coordinating tournaments and other activities.

=== Patrick Henry College ===
Patrick Henry College, or PHC, is a private, non-denominational Protestant college, founded by HSLDA, that focuses on teaching classical liberal arts and government, located in Purcellville, Virginia. It is the first college in America founded specifically for Christian home-schooled students. The school was incorporated in 1998 by Michael Farris. It officially opened September 20, 2000, with 92 students, and has since grown to approximately 325 students.

== Significant court cases ==
=== Federal courts ===
Calabretta v. Floyd

- In the 1990s, HSLDA represented a family in their suit against a Yolo County, California, police officer and social worker who conducted a warrantless search, including strip search of minor children, during a child abuse investigation. The social worker argued that she was not bound by the Fourth Amendment restrictions against unreasonable search and seizure. Furthermore, both the social worker and police officer claimed immunity from suits regardless of whether or not they violated a family's constitutional rights. The Ninth Circuit Court of Appeals ruled on August 26, 1999, that "a social worker and a police officer are not entitled to qualified immunity for investigating a report of a child crying by making a nonconsensual entry into a home without a search warrant or special exigency and coercing a parent to aid them in strip-searching her child." This ruling clarified that social workers are government officials and are bound by the Fourth Amendment and may be sued for violations of that amendment and has been cited repeatedly in subsequent court rulings regarding searches in child abuse investigations.

Camdenton R-III School District v. Mr. and Mrs. F

- In 2006, HSLDA represented a family that sought to have their son protected from a government mandated "special needs evaluation". The Eighth Circuit Court of Appeals ruled that a school district may not force a child to undergo a special needs evaluation against the desires of the child's parents. The school district rested its arguments on the federal Individuals with Disabilities Act (IDEA). However, the court ruled that "Where a home-schooled child's parents refuse consent [for an evaluation], privately educate the child, and expressly waive all benefits under the IDEA, an evaluation would have no purpose. . . . [A] district may not force an evaluation under the circumstances in this case."

Loudermilk vs. Arpaio, et al.

- A 2007 decision by the Arizona District Court states that entry by law enforcement and child protective services personnel into a private residence is not consensual when it is given after law enforcement threatens the family with the arrest of the parents and seizure of their children.

=== State courts ===
F vs. Braxton Family

- Maine Supreme Court ruled that parents' rights to their children override grandparents' rights to their grandchildren. HSLDA represented a family against the grandparents. The grandparents disagreed with the parents' child-rearing decisions and sued the parents to have unrestricted, court-mandated access to the children. The Maine Supreme Court affirmed a lower court ruling against the grandparents.

The People v. DeJonge

- Michigan Supreme Court struck down the state's teacher certificate requirement as an unconstitutional abridgment of the constitution's free exercise of religion clause. The DeJonges were convicted of teaching their children without a government issued teacher's certificate. HSLDA represented the family in its appeals which established that parents do not need a teacher's certificate to teach their children.

In the Matter of Stumbo

- The North Carolina Supreme Court unanimously affirmed that social services may not begin an investigation based solely on an anonymous tip. Furthermore, it reaffirmed that social service workers are bound, as government employees, to the Fourth Amendment assurances against unreasonable search and seizure.

In Re Gauthier Children: Petition to Compel Cooperation with Child Abuse Investigation

- HSLDA represented a family which faced a court-ordered home visit by a social service worker after the family was accused of medical neglect. The juvenile court approved the court-order without probable cause. The Superior Court of Pennsylvania found that the court-order was illegal in that it "was unsupported by probable cause and therefore violated their state and federal constitutional rights against unreasonable searches and seizures."

== See also ==
- Generation Joshua
- Patrick Henry College
- National Christian Forensics and Communications Association (NCFCA)
