= Witters v. Washington Department of Services for the Blind =

- Supreme Court of the United States

Argued November 6, 1985 Decided January 27, 1986
- Full case name: Witters v. Washington Department of Services for the Blind
- Docket no.: 84-1070
- Citations: 474 U.S. 481 (more) 106 S. Ct. 748; 88 L. Ed. 2d 846

Case history
- Prior: Washington Supreme Court denied Witters's petition for relief, 102 Wash. 2d 624 (1984); 689 P. 2d 53 (1984). US Supreme Court granted certiorari.
- Subsequent: On remand, the Washington Supreme Court declined to require the Department to provide to Witters with vocation aid under the Free Exercise Clause, and the US Supreme Court declined certiorari.

Holding
- The Establishment Clause is not violated by providing financial aid that is then conveyed by an individual to a religious organization.

Court membership
- Chief Justice Warren E. Burger Associate Justices William J. Brennan Jr. · Byron White; Thurgood Marshall · Harry Blackmun; Lewis F. Powell Jr. · William Rehnquist; John P. Stevens · Sandra Day O'Connor

Case opinions
- Majority: Marshall, joined by Burger, Brennan, White, Blackmun, Powell, Rehnquist, Stevens
- Concurrence: White
- Concurrence: Powell, joined by Burger, Rehnquist
- Concurrence: O'Connor

Laws applied
- U.S. Const. amend. I

Witters v. Washington Department of Services for the Blind, 474 U.S. 481 (1986), is a decision by the Supreme Court of the United States in which the Court ruled that the Establishment Clause did not prevent the state of Washington from providing financial vocational assistance to a blind man who sought to study at a Christian college to become a pastor, missionary, or youth pastor. The Court ruled that the Establishment Clause does not prevent financial assistance from a state vocational rehabilitation program from being used for religious instruction.

== Background ==
Larry Witters was eligible under Washington state law to receive financial assistance to pursue vocational instruction. At the time, he was attending a private Bible college with the intent to pursue a career as a pastor, missionary, or youth minister. The Commission for the Blind denied him aid on the basis that the Washington State Constitution barred state funds from being used to assist an individual in pursuit of a career or degree in theology. The Washington Supreme Court sustained the Commission's decision but used the US Constitution as the basis for its decision.

== Decision ==
In a 9-0 holding, the Court ruled in favor of Witters. The Court reasoned that the test established in Lemon v. Kurtzman was applicable and that aid to Witters would meet the Lemon test. The Court found that there was a clear secular purpose to the law. Also, the Court ruled that the primary effect of the statute was an effect on Witters, not religion. Finally, the case was ruled to have no entanglement with religion since the decision as to where the aid money would be spent was made solely by the individual, not by any government agency so the Establishment Clause was not violated.

The case was remanded back to the state court. On remand, after the United States Supreme Court reversed the Establishment Clause holding, the Washington court held the program inconsistent with one of its Blaine Amendments, a decision the United States Supreme Court declined to review.

== Counsel ==
Witters was represented by Michael P. Farris. Timothy R. Malone represented the respondent.
