= Sara Diamond (sociologist) =

American sociologist, journalist and attorney

Sara R. Diamond
- Education: University of California, Irvine; University of California, Berkeley (PhD)
- Occupations: Sociologist, journalist and attorney
- Known for: Books about the Christian Right in the United States, and The Sara Diamond Collection on the U.S. Right, at the Bancroft Library

Sara Diamond (born 1958) is an American sociologist, journalist and attorney, and the author of four books that "study and expose the agenda and tactics of the American political right wing", including three which focused on the Christian Right in the United States.

== Early life and education ==
Sara Rose Diamond was born on November 28, 1958 in Boston, Massachusetts.

Diamond attended the University of California, Irvine, graduating in 1979. She then attended graduate school at U.C. Berkeley, where she earned a M.A in sociology in 1988, followed by a Ph.D. in 1993.

== Career ==
Following the publication of her first book, Spiritual Warfare: The Politics of the Christian Right, Diamond was interviewed frequently on Pacifica Radio stations during the 1990s, as well as on the Alternative Radio program.

Having conducted research since the early 1980s, Diamond's Ph.D. dissertation, entitled "Right-Wing Movements in the United States, 1945-1992", served as the basis for her second book, Roads to Dominion, which focused on Christian Dominionism.

Diamond's book, Not by Politics Alone: The Enduring Influence of the Christian Right, was reviewed by Booklist, Kirkus Reviews, Library Journal, and Publishers Weekly.

Diamond has taught journalism and sociology at several California universities, and for several years wrote a regular column for Z Magazine. She is also known for her critique of the US Institute of Peace.

Diamond then switched careers, attending the University of California College of the Law, San Francisco, from which she graduated in 2003. Her law offices are located in Richmond, California.

=== U.C. Berkeley archive ===
The Bancroft Library at U.C. Berkeley maintains the Sara Diamond Collection on the U.S. Right, an archive of the materials she assembled about the conservative movement in the United States. University publications have described it as one of the largest collections of its type in the country.

== Books ==
- Spiritual Warfare: The Politics of the Christian Right, South End Press, Boston. 1989.
- Roads to Dominion: Right-Wing Movements and Political Power in the United States, Guilford Press, New York. 1995. ISBN 0-89862-862-8
- Facing the Wrath: Confronting the Right in Dangerous Times, Common Courage Press, Monroe, Maine. 1996.
- Not by Politics Alone: The Enduring Influence of the Christian Right, Guilford Press, New York. 1998. ISBN 1-57230-385-9

=== Reviews ===
- Nation, April 26, 1999, Abby Scher, "Political Chapter, Bible Verse," p. 30.
- Women's Review of Books, December, 1999, Kathleen M. Blee, "Right Makes Might," pp. 5–6.
