= Western Christian High School (Upland, California) =

Co-educational private Christian high school in California

Coordinates: 34°5′43″N 117°39′13″W

Western Christian High School, also known as Western Christian Schools, is a co-educational private Christian high school in Upland, California. The school was established in 1920. Western Christian also has a middle school, elementary school and preschool in Claremont, California. In 2020, the superintendent was John Attwood.

In 1970, Western Christian High School moved to real estate formerly used by Azusa Pacific College, where the enrollment that year was of about 235 students. The school at the time had a choir of about 50 students, called the Good News Singers. Bill May was the principal at the time. By 1992, the school's choir had 54 members.

In 1997, it started a home-schooling program called Western Christian PSP (Private Satellite Program), in association with the founders of that program, Marilyn and Bill Stephens. The Western Christian PSP later became Legacy Christian School Private Satellite Program.

In 2005, the cheerleading coach was Jaime Fulton, who lead a 20-girl squad. In 2013, the American Legion nominated Western Christian students to the California American Legion Boys State, which was held in Sacramento. Despite campaigning, the Western Christian students did not win elections there.

== Notable alumni ==
- Bre Payton (Western Christian Schools Private Satellite Program)
- Calyx Hampton professional wrestler
