= Bre Payton =

American journalist (1992–2018)

- Born: Breanna Claire Payton; June 8, 1992; San Dimas, California, U.S.
- Died: December 28, 2018 (aged 26); San Diego, California, U.S.
- Cause of death: H1N1 flu and meningitis
- Education: Patrick Henry College
- Occupation: Conservative commentator
- Employer: The Federalist

Breanna Claire Payton (June 8, 1992 – December 28, 2018) was an American conservative writer.

== Early life and education ==
Payton was born on June 8, 1992, in San Dimas, California. She graduated from high school at the Western Christian High School. For a time, she worked as a Watchdog.org reporter. She earned a degree in journalism from Patrick Henry College in 2015.

== Career ==
Payton worked as a commentator for The Federalist from 2015 to 2018, which labeled her as a "rising star". She was also a conservative commentator on television, appearing on BBC News, Fox News, Fox Business, and the One America News Network. She was a 2018 Claremont Institute Publius Fellow.

== Death ==
Payton died unexpectedly of influenza A virus subtype H1N1 and meningitis on December 28, 2018.
