= Gene Edward Veith =

American Lutheran author, scholar, and professor

- Born: October 15, 1951 (age 75)

Academic background
- Education: University of Kansas

Academic work
- Discipline: English, Literature
- Institutions: Concordia University Wisconsin; Patrick Henry College

Gene Edward Veith (born October 15, 1951) is an author, scholar, and Professor of Literature emeritus at Patrick Henry College. He received his Ph.D. in English from the University of Kansas in 1979. Additionally, he holds honorary doctorates from Concordia Theological Seminary, Concordia University Irvine, and Patrick Henry College.

== Background ==
He served there as Dean of Academic Affairs and Provost, and was the culture editor of World magazine. He has written 20 books and over 100 scholarly works. Veith served previously on the faculty as Professor of English at Concordia University Wisconsin, as well as being the Dean of the School of Arts and Sciences and the director of the Cranach Institute.

== Works ==
- Authentic Christianity: How Lutheran Theology Speaks to a Postmodern World
- Christianity in an Age of Terrorism
- Christians in a .Com World: Getting Connected Without Being Consumed
- Classical Education: The Movement Sweeping America
- Classical Education: Towards The Revival of American Schooling
- Family Vocation: God's Calling In Marriage, Parenting, And Childhood
- The Gift of Art: The Place of the Arts in Scripture
- God at Work: Your Christian Vocation in All of Life
- Honky-Tonk Gospel: The Story of Sin and Salvation in Country Music
- Imagination Redeemed: Glorifying God with a Neglected Part of Your Mind
- Loving God With All Your Mind: Thinking as a Christian in a Postmodern World
- Modern Fascism: Liquidating the Judeo-Christian Worldview
- Modern Fascism: The Threat to the Judeo-Christian View
- Fascism: Modern and Postmodern
- Painters of Faith: The Spiritual Landscape in Nineteenth Century America
- A Place to Stand
- Post-Christian: A Guide to Contemporary Thought and Culture
- Postmodern Times: A Christian Guide to Contemporary Thought and Culture
- Reading Between the Lines
- Reformation Spirituality: The Religion of George Herbert
- The Soul of Prince Caspian: Exploring Spiritual Truth in the Land of Narnia
- The Soul of the Lion, the Witch, & the Wardrobe
- The Spirituality of the Cross
- State of the Arts: Bezalel to Mapplethorpe
