= 1993 Virginia lieutenant gubernatorial election =

- November 2, 1993
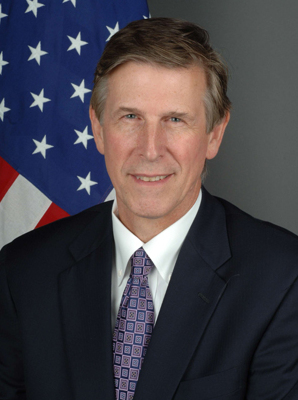

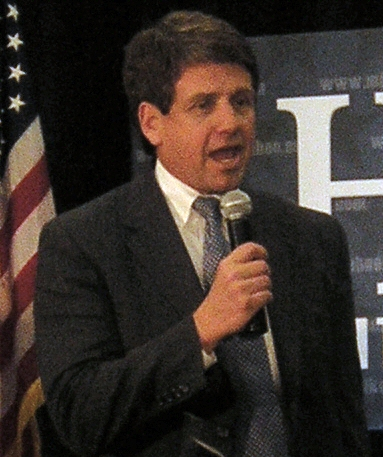
Nominee	Don Beyer	Michael Farris
Party	Democratic	Republican
Popular vote	947,837	791,593
Percentage	54.49%	45.51%
- Beyer: 50–60% 60–70% 70–80% Farris: 50–60% 60–70% 70–80%
Lieutenant Governor before election
Don Beyer
Democratic
Elected Lieutenant Governor
Don Beyer
Democratic

The 1993 Virginia lieutenant gubernatorial election was held on November 2, 1993. Democratic incumbent Don Beyer defeated Republican nominee Michael Farris with 54.49% of the vote.

== General election ==
=== Candidates ===
- Don Beyer, Democratic, Incumbent
- Michael Farris, Republican, Attorney

=== Results ===
1993 Virginia lieutenant gubernatorial election
Party	Candidate	Votes	%	±%
Democratic	Don Beyer (incumbent)	947,837	54.49%	
Republican	Michael Farris	791,593	45.51%	
Majority		156,244		
Turnout				
Democratic hold		Swing		
