= Graham Walker (academic) =

American academic

- Born: Graham Hewitt Walker
- Education: B.A., Houghton College; Ph.D. in Political Philosophy from the University of Notre Dame
- Occupations: University administrator, Professor
- Employer: Patrick Henry College
- Known for: Second president of Patrick Henry College
- Title: President of Patrick Henry College, Government professor
- Term: 2006 – 2014
- Predecessor: Michael Farris
- Successor: Gene Edward Veith Jr.
- Website: PHC - Office of the President

Graham Hewitt Walker is an American academic, professor, and Senior Research Scholar at the Witherspoon Institute. Walker received his Ph.D. in political philosophy from Notre Dame in 1988. He also received a diploma in international security studies from the Geneva Graduate Institute in Switzerland. He is a former administrator in Christian higher education, serving as the Vice President for Academic Affairs and Dean of Oklahoma Wesleyan University as well as the second President of Patrick Henry College. Walker has previously taught at the University of Pennsylvania, The Catholic University of America and Patrick Henry College.

Academic offices
Preceded by Michael Farris	President of Patrick Henry College; 2006 – 2014	Succeeded by Gene Edward Veith Jr.
