= Patrick Henry College =

Private Conservative Christian college in Purcellville, Virginia

Coordinates: 39.140479°N 77.690248°W

- Other name: PHC
- Motto: Pro Christo et Libertate
- Motto in English: For Christ and for Liberty
- Type: Private liberal arts
- Established: 2000
- Chancellor: Michael Farris (emeritus)
- President: Jack Haye
- Provost: Gene Edward Veith (emeritus)
- Dean: Mark Mitchell (Academic affairs)
- Faculty: 19 full-time
- Students: 380
- Location: 10 Patrick Henry Circle, Purcellville, Virginia 20132, U.S.
- Campus: Suburban, c. 100 acres (40 ha)
- Colors: Blue and gold
- Nickname: Sentinels
- Website: phc.edu

Patrick Henry College (PHC) is a private liberal arts non-denominational conservative Protestant Christian college located in Purcellville, Virginia. Its departments teach classical liberal arts, government, strategic intelligence in national security, economics and business analytics, history, journalism, environmental science and stewardship, and literature. The university has accreditation from the Commission on Colleges of the Southern Association of Colleges and Schools (SACS-COC) as of 2022. Patrick Henry College continues to be accredited by the Transnational Association of Christian Colleges and Schools (TRACS), which is also recognized as an institutional accreditor by the United States Department of Education. Its graduation rate is 67%.

== History ==
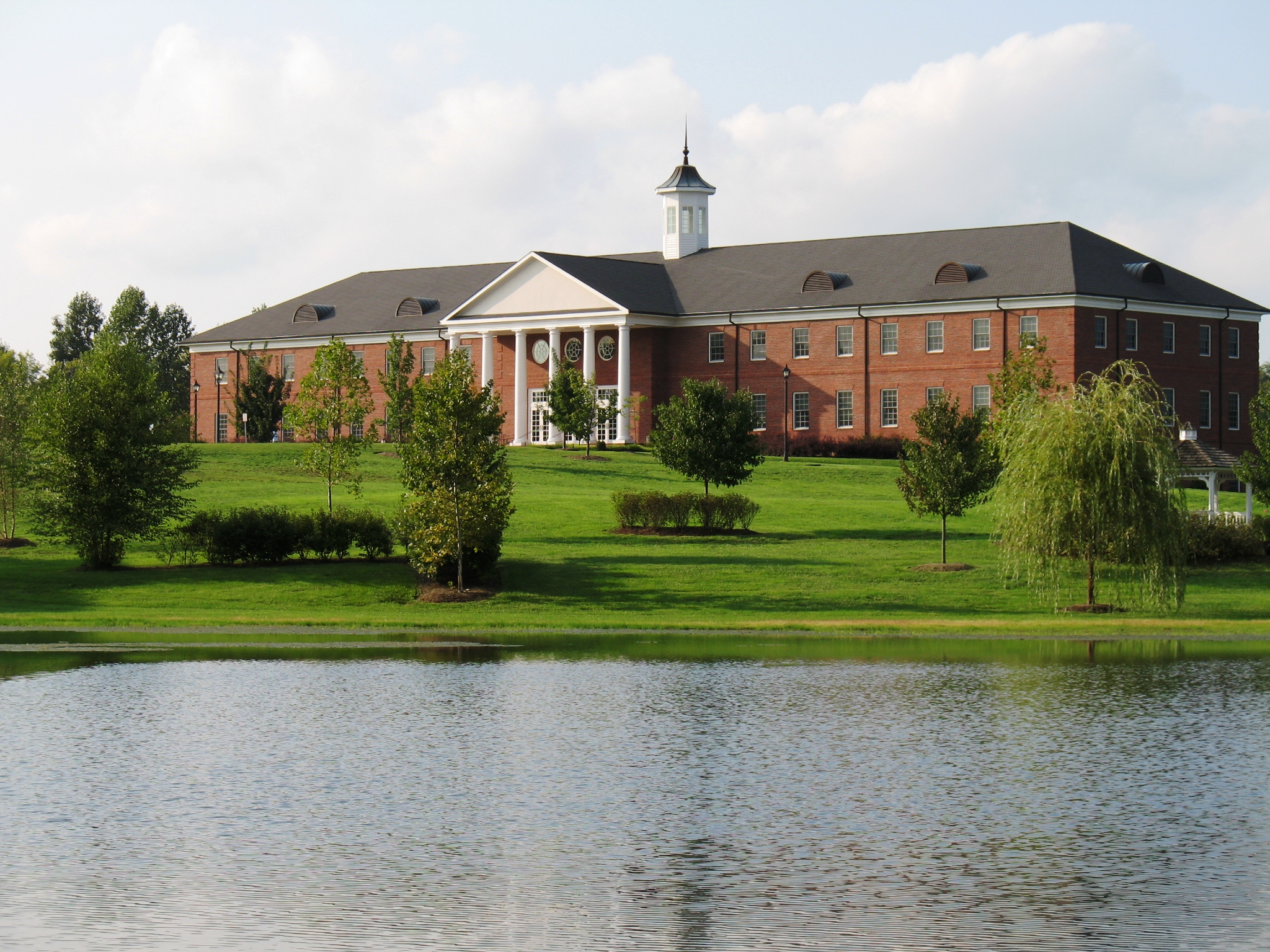
Patrick Henry College – Purcellville, Virginia

Patrick Henry College was incorporated in 1998 by Michael Farris, who is also the founder and chairman of the board of the Home School Legal Defense Association, with which PHC is still closely connected. It officially opened September 20, 2000, with a class of 92 students. The college eschews federal financial aid and is therefore relieved from United States Department of Education requirements on demographic makeup and other quotas. The school does not ask about race or ethnicity on applications.

PHC receives all of its funding from tuition fees and donations. The college states that it does not accept any money from sources that seek to supersede the authority of its Board of Trustees or conflict with its foundational statements. PHC adds new facilities and programs only as funds are available.

PHC is a member of the advisory board of Project 2025, a collection of conservative and right-wing policy proposals from the Heritage Foundation to reshape the United States federal government and consolidate executive power should the Republican nominee win the 2024 presidential election.

=== Accreditation ===
Patrick Henry College received accreditation in 2007 from the Transnational Association of Christian Colleges and Schools, a national accrediting organization for Christian colleges, universities, and seminaries created by the Institute for Creation Research. In June 2021, the college received Candidacy status from The Commission on Colleges of the Southern Association of Colleges and Schools (SACS-COC). As of June 2022, the school is accredited by the Southern Association of Colleges and Schools. The college was denied accreditation by the American Academy for Liberal Education in 2002 because creationism was part of the curriculum. On June 30, 2005, the school was officially recognized by the United States Department of Education (ED) as an institution eligible for ED programs. It also allowed students to use more scholarships and grants and made donors and students eligible for various tax benefits. In 2012, the Transnational Association of Christian Colleges and Schools reaffirmed Patrick Henry College's accreditation for a period of ten years.

== Religious affirmations ==
Students must sign a "Statement of Faith" before they enroll, affirming belief in what the college considers core Christian doctrines. For example, students are asked to acknowledge "Satan exists as a personal, malevolent being who acts as tempter and accuser, for whom Hell, the place of eternal punishment, was prepared, where all who die outside of Christ shall be confined in conscious torment for eternity. [...] Man is by nature sinful and is inherently in need of salvation, which is exclusively found by faith alone in Jesus Christ and His shed blood. [...] Christ's death provides substitutionary atonement for our sins." The college professes non-denominational Christian beliefs, informed by Evangelical Protestantism.

Teaching faculty must also sign the Statement of Faith and a more detailed Statement of Biblical Worldview, which represents the college's requirements for what should be taught. For example, the Biblical Worldview Applications states, "Any biology, Bible, or other courses at PHC dealing with creation will teach creation from the understanding of Scripture that God's creative work, as described in Genesis 1:1–31, was completed in six twenty-four-hour days."

In 2006, PHC founder Farris commented that the college held the view that its faith was the only true faith ("we believe that there is truth and there is error") and expressed disapproval of religious and social toleration. "Tolerance cannot coexist with liberty" because "the crowd of tolerance wants to ban speech."

PHC does not receive federal funding: "In order to safeguard our distinctly Christian worldview, we do not accept or participate in government funding." In consequence, PHC is not required to follow federal guidelines, like most other institutions, concerning sex-based and other forms of discrimination.

== Campus ==
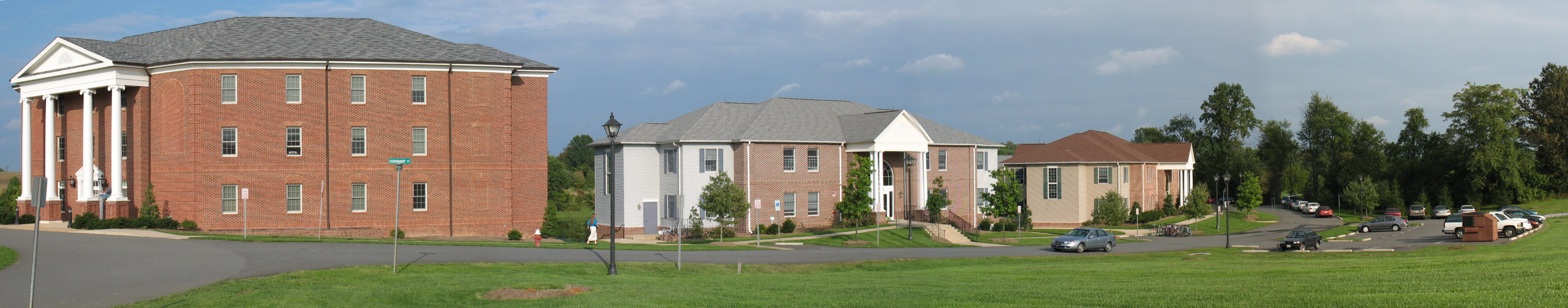
Patrick Henry College Residential Village (prior to the construction of the Barbara Hodel Center)

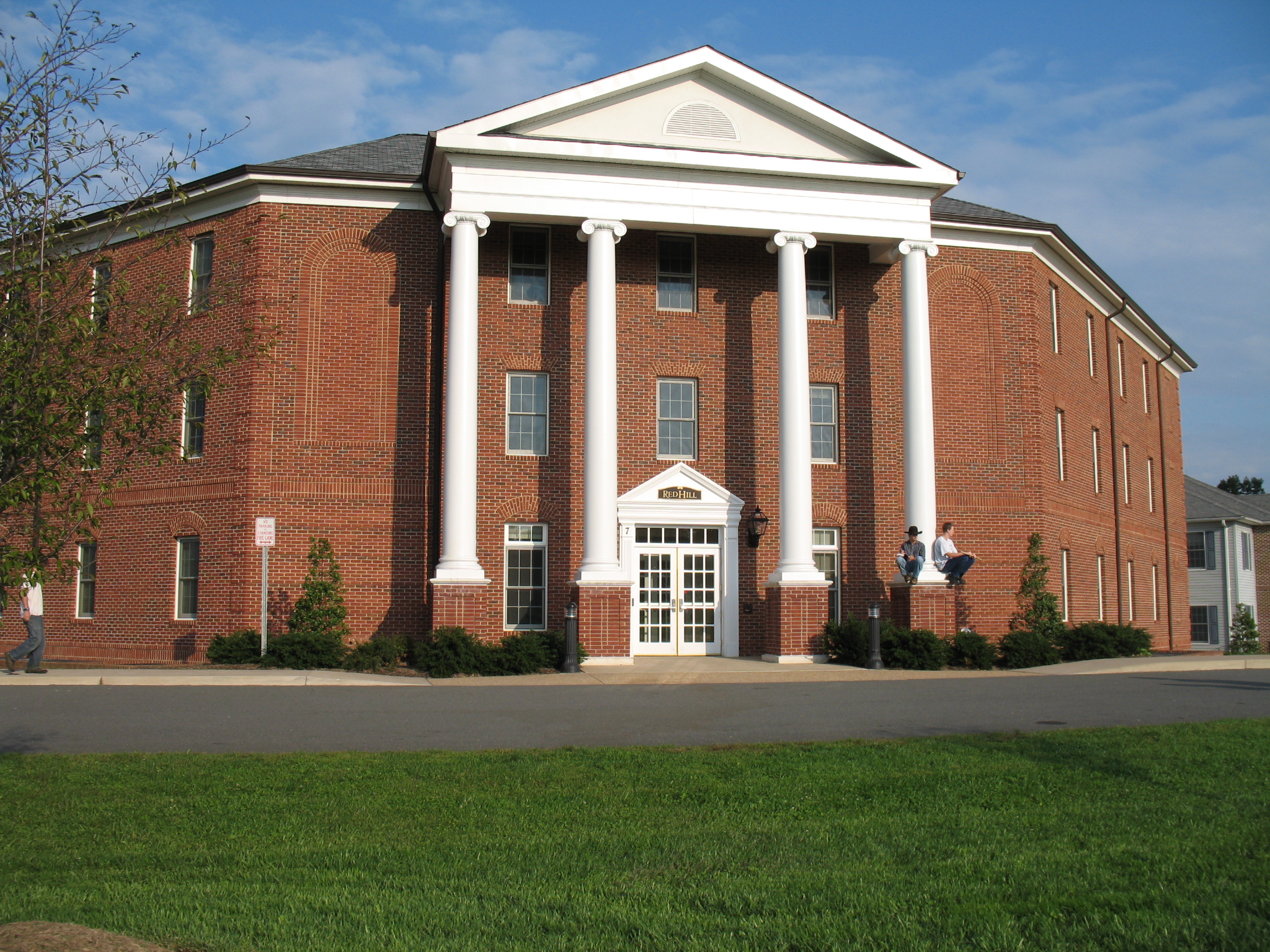
Red Hill

Patrick Henry College is located in the town of Purcellville in rural northern Virginia, approximately 40 miles (64 km) northwest of Washington, D.C. The campus currently consists of seven buildings arranged around a retention pond popularly called "Lake Bob", as well as several athletic fields. The oldest structure, Founders Hall, opened in 2000 and contains three classrooms, the college library, and various administrative and faculty offices. It is also home to the offices of the Home School Legal Defense Association. Hanna Rosin, author of God's Harvard, described the campus as "tiny, less like an Ivy League college than like a Hollywood set of an old Ivy League school." The buildings are of Colonial Revival architecture. The artwork in Founders Hall consists of copies of portraits of the Founding Fathers placed along a staircase, leading to a picture of Patrick Henry at the second Virginia convention which features a light from heaven guiding Henry's speech. The artwork is designed to, in the words of Hanna Rosin, "remind the students that America was founded as a Christian nation."

The school's residential village is composed of six residence halls located along the edges of the lake. There are three men's and three women's dormitories. The four smaller dormitories opened in 2001, while Red Hill, a male dormitory, was opened in 2003. The school's sixth dormitory, Shiloh, opened in 2024 and is a women's dormitory. When Shiloh opened, the school changed the Montpelier dormitory from a women's dormitory to a men's dormitory. Located in the basement of Mount Vernon is an auditorium referred to as Town Hall, where the school's daily chapel sessions and other special events are held. The residence halls are set up in an arc shape around the lake.

=== Barbara Hodel Student Center ===
In August 2009 the college opened a 106,000-square-foot (9,800 m^{2}) student life center, which significantly expanded dining, classroom, recreational, and athletic facilities. Approximately 1,000 people attended the dedication ceremony featuring evangelical leader James Dobson of Focus on the Family as keynote speaker.

== Governance ==
The college's founder, Mike Farris, announced his resignation as president of the college on March 6, 2006, to become chancellor. Graham Walker served as the second president of the college from 2006 to 2014. The editor of World, Gene Edward Veith, served as Interim President.

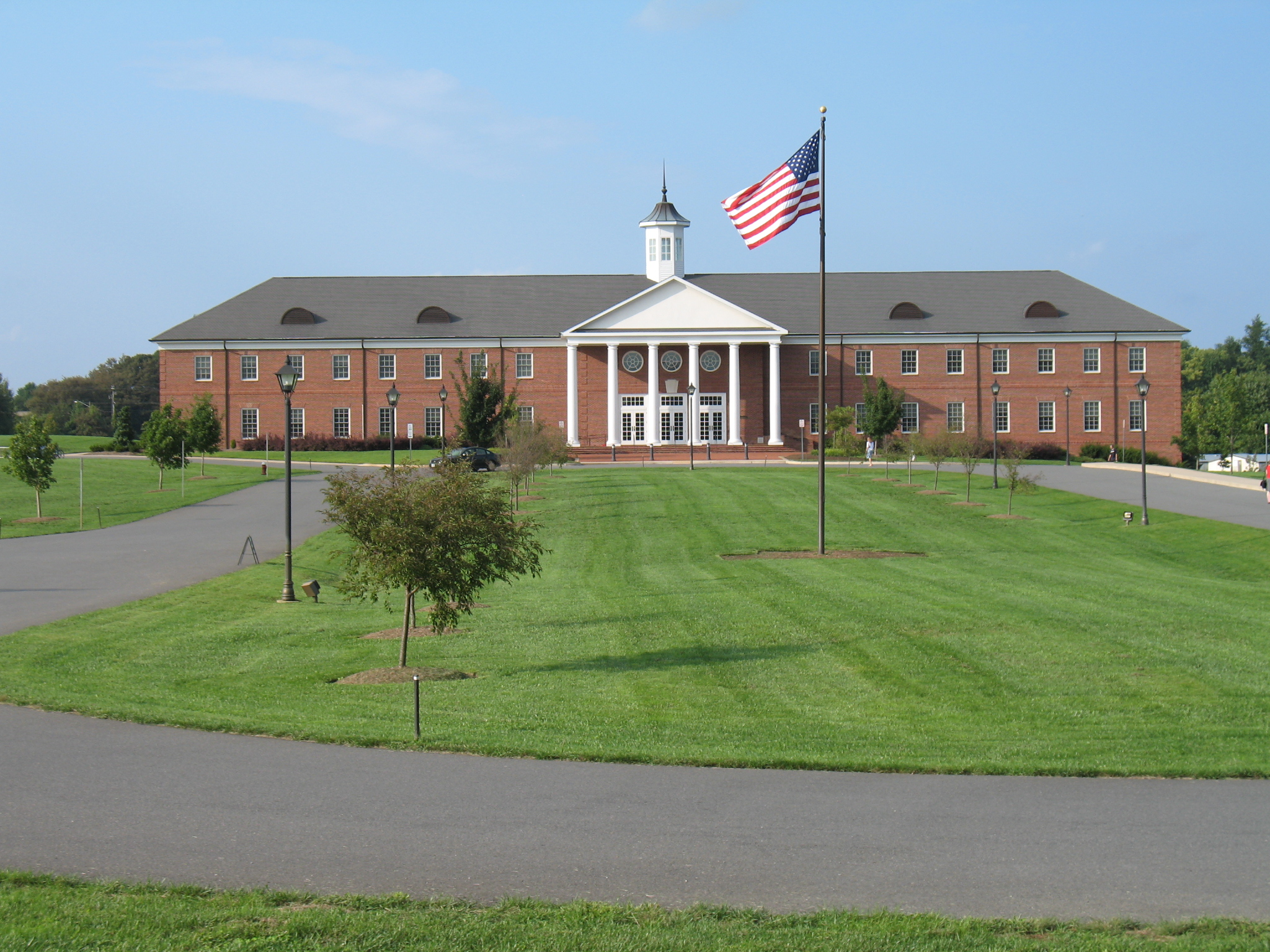
Founders Hall and Patrick Henry Circle

Jack Haye was made third President of Patrick Henry College in 2015. He was a banker for thirty years.

== Academics ==
Students at the college can choose their major from within seven fields of study. The Government Department offers majors in Government, Journalism, Economics & Business Analytics, and Strategic Intelligence in National Security. The Government major provides an option to specialize in American Politics and Policy, International Politics and Policy, Political Theory, Strategic Intelligence, or a General Government track. The Classical Liberal Arts Department offer degrees in Classical Liberal Arts, History, and Literature and Minors in Biblical Studies, Classics, History, Journalism, Music, and Philosophy.

On January 24, 2007, the school successfully completed an on-site review by a TRACS assessment team, and was granted accreditation in April.

=== Faculty ===
In 2024, PHC's website listed twenty full-time professors, of which eighteen held terminal degrees in their field. As of 2023, PHC also listed twenty-seven part-time faculty, all of whom have received a master's degree or higher. Chancellor Emeritus Mike Farris has a J.D., has authored several novels and critiques of constitutional law, and has argued numerous cases before federal and state high courts, as well as the United States Supreme Court. In addition to serving as Chancellor Emeritus of Patrick Henry College, he is also chairman and General Counsel of the Home School Legal Defense Association. From 2017 through 2022, he was CEO and general counsel for Alliance Defending Freedom.

==== 2006 academic freedom dispute ====
In 2005, a library clerk was asked to resign for promoting the idea that baptism is essential for salvation, considered a violation of the Statement of Faith. Further, in March 2006, five of the college's sixteen faculty members—Erik Root, Robert Stacey, Kevin Culberson, Todd Bates, and David Noe—resigned in protest, saying that the president's interpretation of the Biblical Worldview Policy conflicted with their views on academic freedom.

The resignations led to a discussion about the practical implementation of a strong liberal arts education along with conservative biblical beliefs and what a balanced discussion between the two might look like. David C. Noe, an assistant professor of classics at PHC, departed after disagreements on how non-Christian authors should be viewed and valued when compared to Biblical texts. He found PHC's application of its statement of faith incompatible with his personal view of Christianity.

=== Forensics ===
==== Moot court ====
Since 2001, PHC's moot court program has reached the final round in 18 out of 22 years and won 12 times in the American Moot Court Association National Competition. In 2016, the team won the Nelson Mandela World Human Rights Moot Court Competition. Until 2022, the program held the number one position in the American Moot Court Association's official rankings. While the program did not reach the final round in 2021 and 2022 (ceding its top ranking to the University of Chicago), in 2023 it reclaimed its top ranking.

In 2019, Dean of Academic Affairs, Pre-Law Advisory, and the college's Moot Court and Mock Trial coach, Frank Guliuzza, died after coaching the Moot Court team through 8 of its 11 championship titles.

==== Mock Trial ====
PHC fields a mock trial team in the American Mock Trial Association. In the 2021–2022 season, PHC advanced two teams to the National Championship Tournament. PHC A came 4th place in its division, while PHC B earned an Honorable Mention as the 11th place in its division. As of the 2022–2023 season, PHC is the only college in the nation to have two teams within the top 20 teams in AMTA's Team Power Rankings, with PHC A at #6 and PHC B at #16, respectively. This is a repeat achievement by PHC has repeated this feat; in the prior 2021–2022 season, PHC A sat at #3, with PHC B at #20.

In 2022, PHC graduate Benjamin Crosby won the UCLA Law & Drexel Law's Trial By Combat competition, a one-on-one competition hosted for outstanding competitors in AMTA. With his victory, PHC became the fifth school to field a Trial by Combat champion, along with NYU, the University of Cincinnati, Duke University, and the University of California, Los Angeles.

==== Civic Debate ====
In 2021, 52 students represented PHC in civic debate, nearly two-thirds of them being freshmen or sophomores. PHC participated in a mix of virtual and in-person events. At the 2021 Lafayette Debates National Championship hosted jointly by George Washington University and France's École de guerre-Terre, PHC students won 1st and 2nd place. In the spring 2022 NATO Summit, which included masters' level students and undergraduates, PHC students achieved 2nd through 5th places. At the General Welfare debates, PHC students achieved 1st through 3rd place. These resulted in possible internship offers to several students from the distinguished event judges. Recently, PHC students outperformed Ivy League universities, including Harvard and Yale, to win the European Union Delegation's 2023 Schuman Challenge.

==== Pre-Law Advising ====
PHC's LSAT scores rank among the best in the United States. In both 2019 and 2020, PHC students (including both alumni and current students) earned an average of 167.6 on the Law School Admission Test. In 2021, graduating seniors averaged 171, and all PHC students taking the LSAT (including alumni) averaged 170.6. These results are in the 98th percentile.

== Student life ==
Students may not have sex outside of marriage, or use alcohol or tobacco while under the authority of the college, which is defined as any time during a semester while enrolled, on or off campus. Men and women are not allowed in each other's dorm rooms except during open dorm days, and underclassmen are subject to a curfew. Firearms are prohibited on campus.

In the 2000s, Hanna Rosin, author of God's Harvard, said that "never would you find a group of better-behaved teenagers than on the campus of Patrick Henry."

=== Civic involvement ===
Students are involved in the community, and PHC requires its Government students to fulfill up to 24 credits of apprenticeship projects, which include internships, research and writing projects, and extracurricular activities such as moot court, Model United Nations, and Mock Trial. Students currently serve as interns in a wide variety of political organizations, such as the White House, a variety of government agencies, congressional offices and think-tanks. Students are active in local and national politics, often working with local political action groups to lobby for conservative issues at the federal and state levels. Classes are canceled the day of the national elections and the day before, so that students may volunteer on political campaigns; and many students act as Student Action Team leaders for Generation Joshua, leading groups of usually homeschooled high school students volunteering on campaigns across the United States.

=== Athletics ===
Patrick Henry College competes as the Sentinels, fielding teams in men's and women's intercollegiate soccer and basketball, and is a member of the United States Collegiate Athletic Association (USCAA). In 2026, the Patrick Henry men's basketball team won the Bible College National Invitational Tournament in Chicago, Illinois.

=== Sexual assault controversy ===
Several female students and alumni have accused the college administration of blaming them for sexual assaults that occurred during their enrollment at Patrick Henry College. In 2020, PHC dropout and U.S. Representative Madison Cawthorn was accused by over 150 college alumni of engaging in "sexually predatory behavior" toward fellow students during his time on campus.

=== LGBT discrimination ===
On April 12, 2007, LGBT rights group Soulforce selected PHC as one of the targets of its annual "Equality Ride" to protest the stance of conservative Christian colleges concerning homosexuality. Patrick Henry College officials did not allow Soulforce to enter the university premises but did suggest that student representatives engage in a formal debate at a neutral location on the merits of the proposed Federal Marriage Amendment to the US Constitution. Soulforce organizers declined this suggestion and notified the college of their intent to enter the campus. After being refused entry, Soulforce protesters formed a picket line outside of the campus entrance and protested for approximately five hours.

== Notable alumni ==
- Gabe Evans (class of 2009), politician, U.S. representative for Colorado's 8th congressional district
- Alyssa Farah Griffin (class of 2011), co-host of The View and former White House Director of Strategic Communications
- Bre Payton (class of 2015), writer, conservative commentator
- Teresa Scanlan (class of 2016), Miss America 2011
- Lindsey See, commissioner, Federal Energy Regulatory Commission
- Simon Sefzik (class of 2021), former member of the Washington State Senate from the 42nd district
