= Religious views on euthanasia =

There are many religious views on euthanasia, although many moral theologians are critical of the procedure.

== Buddhism ==
There are many views among Buddhists on the issue of euthanasia, but many are critical of the procedure.

An important value of Buddhism is compassion. Some Buddhists use compassion to justify euthanasia because the person suffering is relieved of pain. However, Buddhist ethicist Damien Keown, in a 2005 piece in The Lancet, argued that "to embark on any course of action whose aim is to destroy human life, irrespective of the quality of the individual's motive," is immoral.

In Theravada Buddhism, a lay person recites each day: "I undertake the precept to abstain from destroying living beings." For Buddhist monastics (bhikkhu), however, the rules are more explicit. For example, the monastic code (Patimokkha) states:

Should any bhikkhu intentionally deprive a human being of life, or search for an assassin for him, or praise the advantages of death, or incite him to die (thus): "My good man, what use is this wretched, miserable life to you? Death would be better for you than life," or with such an idea in mind, such a purpose in mind, should in various ways praise the advantages of death or incite him to die; he also is defeated and no longer in communion.

== Christianity ==
=== Catholicism ===
The Catholic Church opposes active euthanasia and physician-assisted suicide on the grounds that life is a gift from God and should not be prematurely shortened. However, the church allows dying people to refuse extraordinary treatments that would minimally prolong life without hope of recovery, a form of passive euthanasia.

Catholic opposition to active euthanasia can be traced back to ancient Jewish and early Christian attitudes towards suicide. Later in the Middle Ages and Renaissance, Thomas Aquinas exemplified and shaped mainstream Christian views on suicide. He condemned suicide for violating the natural inclination towards self-preservation and self-perpetuation, for injuring other people and the community, and for defying divine authority over life. Western opinions against suicide among the sick were near-uniform until the mid-19th century, though Catholic thinker Thomas More may have been a notable exception. In Utopia, More appears to advocate for active euthanasia (though the specific term did not exist at the time), but some scholars have questioned whether More's position was serious or satirical.

In the early modern period, Catholic theologians considered moral questions pertaining to refusing medical treatment and passive dying. Francisco de Vitoria argued that a person does not violate the obligation to protect and preserve life if they choose not to take medicine prescribed by a doctor. Domingo Báñez distinguished between ordinary means of preserving life, such as eating and procuring clothing, and extraordinary means, such as painful medical procedures. He asserted that while one is morally obligated to eat and cloth oneself, one is not morally obligated to undergo the amputation of a limb to save one's life. John de Lugo contended that while one must use ordinary means to preserve life, one is not obligated to use ordinary means with no hope of benefit. He also maintained that there is a clear moral distinction between actively killing oneself and allowing death to occur naturally by refusing burdensome treatments.

The Catholic Church became one of the leading opponents of the modern euthanasia movement in the early 1900s. Pope Pius XII was a vocal critic of euthanasia in the 1940s, but in 1957, he wrote "The Prolongation of Life: An Address of Pope Pius XII to an International Congress of Anesthesiologists" in which he declared that physicians did not have an obligation to prolong patients' lives with extraordinary treatments, such as providing ventilator support for patients without hope of recovery. Historian Ian Dowbiggin notes that this permits passive euthanasia in some circumstances without violating Christian doctrine.

On 5 May 1980, the Vatican Congregation for the Doctrine of the Faith issued the Declaration on Euthanasia, condemning euthanasia as a "violation of the divine law, an offense against the dignity of the human person, a crime against life, and an attack on humanity". It noted that advances in medical technology had blurred the line between ordinary and extraordinary means of sustaining life, but allowed terminally ill patients to refuse life-prolonging treatment in situations in which a physician believes the treatment's harm would outweigh the benefit. The declaration stated that a patient's refusal of disproportionate or extraordinary treatment "is not the equivalent of suicide", but instead "should be considered as an acceptance of the human condition". On 22 September 2020, the Congregation for the Doctrine of the Faith issued the letter "Samaritanus bonus", restating the church's opposition to euthanasia and physician-assisted suicide, criticising end-of-life protocols such as do-not-resuscitate orders, urging Catholic hospitals and health-care workers not to engage in "plainly immoral conduct", including referring patients to other hospitals where they might undergo euthanasia, and accusing lawmakers who approved of euthanasia of being "accomplices of a grave sin". However, the letter also repeated the church's allowance for terminally ill patients to refuse life-extending treatments. Reuters noted that the letter did not alter church doctrine, but instead reiterated existing doctrines in stronger language at a time when governments around the world, including those of some traditionally Catholic countries, were liberalising end-of-life care options.

=== Evangelical-Lutheranism ===
The Evangelical-Lutheran Churches teach that "Anything which aims for the death of those who suffer is murder, which God strictly prohibits in His Law."

=== Jehovah's Witnesses ===
Similarly to Catholicism, the sect of Jehovah's Witnesses is in strong opposition to assisted dying; though it has a policy of tacit support for passive euthanasia.

=== Methodism ===
The United Methodist Church has eschewed euthanasia, holding that “the taking of a life” is “an offense against God’s sole dominion over life, and abandonment of hope and humility before God, and an affront to the dignity of and the solidarity among human beings.”

=== Eastern Orthodoxy ===
The Orthodox Church in America, along with other Eastern Orthodox Churches, also opposes euthanasia, stating that it must be condemned as murder stating that, "Euthanasia is the deliberate cessation to end human life."

=== Christian groups in support of euthanasia ===
Groups claiming to speak for Christians rather than the official viewpoints of the Christian clergy have sprung up in a number of countries.

== Hinduism ==
There are two Hindu points of view on euthanasia. By helping to end a painful life a person is performing a good deed and so fulfilling their moral obligations. Euthanasia may also be acceptable if it is used for selfless motives. On the other hand, by helping to end a life, even one filled with suffering, a person is disturbing the timing of the cycle of death and rebirth. This is a bad thing to do, and those involved in the euthanasia will take on the remaining karma of the patient. Death is a natural process, and will come in time.

It is clearly stated in the Vedas that man has only two trustworthy friends in life, the first is called Vidya (knowledge), and the 2nd is called Mrityu (Death). The former is something that is beneficial and a requirement in life, and the latter is something that is inevitable sometimes even unexpected. It is not the euthanasia that is the act of sin, but worldly attachment which causes euthanasia to be looked upon as an act of sin. Even a Sannyasin or Sannyasini if they decide to, are permitted to end his or her life with the hope of reaching moksha i.e. emancipation of the soul.

== Islam ==
Muslims are against euthanasia. They believe that all humans life is sacred because it is given by God, and that God chooses how long each person lives. Human beings should not interfere in this. It is forbidden for a Muslim to plan, or come to know through self-will, the time of his own death in advance.

== Jainism ==
Jainism is based on the principle of non-violence (ahinsa) and is best known for it. Jainism recommends voluntary death or sallekhana for both ascetics and srāvaka (householders) at the end of their life. Sallekhana (also known as Santhara, Samadhi-marana) is made up of two words sal (meaning 'properly') and lekhana, which means to thin out. Properly thinning out of the passions and the body is sallekhana. A person is allowed to fast unto death or take the vow of sallekhana only when certain requirements are fulfilled. It is not considered suicide as the person observing it, must be in a state of full consciousness. When observing sallekhana, one must not have the desire to live or desire to die. Practitioner shouldn't recollect the pleasures enjoyed or, long for the enjoyment of pleasures in the future. The process is still controversial in parts of India. Estimates for death by this means range from 100 to 240 a year. Preventing santhara invites social ostracism.

== Judaism ==
Jewish medical ethics has become divided, partly following denominational lines, over euthanasia and end-of-life treatment since the 1970s. Generally, Jewish thinkers oppose voluntary euthanasia, often vigorously (e.g., J. David Bleich and Eliezer Waldenberg), though there is some backing for voluntary passive euthanasia in limited circumstances. In Conservative Judaism, there has been increasing support for passive euthanasia, including from Elliot Dorff and Byron Sherwin. In Reform Jewish responsa, the preponderance of anti-euthanasia sentiment has shifted in recent years toward increasing support for certain passive euthanasia options. Secular Judaism is a separate category with increasing support for euthanasia. A popular supporter of euthanasia is secular Jewish rabbi Miriam Jerris.

A study performed in 2010 investigated older Jewish women who identified as either Hasidic Orthodox, non-Hasidic Orthodox, or non-observant Orthodox. The study found that all of the Hasidic Orthodox responders disapproved of voluntary euthanasia, whereas a majority of the non-observant Orthodox responders approved of it.

== Shinto ==
In Japan, where the dominant religion is Shinto, 69% of the religious organisations agree with the act of voluntary passive euthanasia. The corresponding figure was 75% when the family asked for it. In Shinto, the prolongation of life using artificial means is a disgraceful act against life. Views on active euthanasia are mixed, with 25% Shinto and Buddhist organisations in Japan supporting voluntary active euthanasia.

== Unitarian Universalism ==
The Unitarian Universalist Association (UUA) recommends observing the ethics and culture of the resident country when determining euthanasia. In 1988 the UUA gathered to share a commitment to The Right to Die with Dignity document which included a resolution supporting self-determination in dying.

== Influence of religious views ==
Religious views on euthanasia are both varied and complicated. While one's view on the matter doesn't necessarily connect directly to their religion, it often impacts a person's opinion. While the influence of religion on one's views towards palliative care do make a difference, they often play a smaller role than one may think. An analysis of the connection between the religion of US adults and their view on euthanasia was done in order to see how they combine. The findings concluded that the religious affiliation one associates with does not necessarily connect with their stance on euthanasia. Research shows that while many belong to a specific religion, they may not always see every aspect as relevant to them.

Some metadata analysis has supported the hypothesis that nurses’ attitudes towards euthanasia and physician assisted suicide are influenced by religion and world view. Attributing more importance to religion also seems to make agreement with euthanasia and physician assisted suicide less likely. A 1995 study of public opinion found that the tendency to see a distinction between active euthanasia and suicide was clearly affected by religious affiliation and education. In Australia, more doctors without formal religious affiliation were sympathetic to active voluntary euthanasia, and acknowledged that they had practiced it, than were doctors who gave any religious affiliation. Of those identifying with a religion, those who reported a Protestant affiliation were intermediate in their attitudes and practices between the agnostic/atheist and the Catholic groups. Catholics recorded attitudes most opposed, but even so, 18 percent of Catholic medical respondents who had been so requested, recorded that they had taken active steps to bring about the death of patients.

== See also ==
- Catholic Church and Nazi euthanasia

== Sources ==
- Dowbiggin, Ian (2003). A Merciful End: The Euthanasia Movement in Modern America. Oxford: Oxford University Press. p. 182-183. ISBN 9780195154436.
- Jain, Vijay K. (2011), Acharya Umasvami's Tattvârthsûtra, Vikalp Printers, ISBN 978-81-903639-2-1, "Non-Copyright"
- Kakar, Sudhir (2014), "A Jain Tradition of Liberating the Soul by Fasting Oneself", Death and Dying, Penguin UK, ISBN 9789351187974
