= Michael Farris (lawyer) =

American lawyer (born 1951)

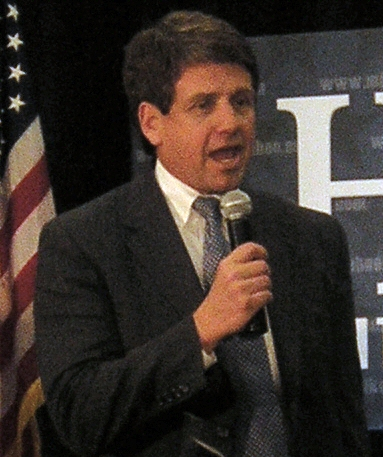
- Farris in 2008

Personal details
- Born: August 27, 1951 (age 75) Conway, Arkansas, U.S.
- Party: Republican
- Spouse: Vickie Farris
- Children: 10
- Education: Western Washington University (BA); Gonzaga University (JD); University of London (LLM)

Michael P. Farris (born August 27, 1951) is an American lawyer. He is a founder of the Home School Legal Defense Association (HSLDA) and Patrick Henry College, which share a campus in Purcellville, Virginia. From 2017 through 2022, he was CEO of and general counsel for Alliance Defending Freedom.

== Early life and education ==
Farris graduated, magna cum laude, with a BA in political science from Western Washington University (formerly Western Washington State College). He then earned his JD from Gonzaga University School of Law. Farris received an LL.M. in public international law from the University of London in 2011.

== Career ==
In 1981, Farris became legal counsel for Concerned Women for America, a socially conservative women's advocacy group founded by Beverly LaHaye, wife of evangelical Christian minister and author Tim LaHaye. In 1983, Farris founded the Home School Legal Defense Association, serving as chairman and general counsel. Farris founded Patrick Henry College, a Christian college, in 2000. He held the positions of president and professor of government from 2000 to 2006. Farris resigned his position as president of HSLDA to take on these new roles. In March 2006, Farris stepped down as president and became chancellor of the college. In January 2017, Farris retired from the position of chancellor but retained the title of "chancellor emeritus."

=== Legal and political career ===
As a lawyer, Farris's cases include over forty reported decisions as lead counsel. These decisions were given by the United States Supreme Court, five U.S. circuit courts of Appeal, seven state Supreme Courts, and five state Courts of Appeal. Farris has argued for the petitioners in the Supreme Court cases Witters v. Washington Department of Services For the Blind in 1985–1986 and National Institute of Family and Life Advocates v. Becerra in 2018.

In 1993, Farris ran unsuccessfully for lieutenant governor of Virginia and was defeated by Democrat Don Beyer, 54–46 percent. However, fellow Republicans George Allen and James Gilmore were elected on the same ballot as governor and attorney general, respectively. Farris's close connection to conservative leaders like Jerry Falwell of the former Moral Majority, Pat Robertson of the Christian Coalition and Phyllis Schlafly of the Eagle Forum proved too controversial. These concerns, inflamed by negative ads by Beyer that portrayed him even more radically, alienated enough moderate voters to cause his defeat.

In 2009 and 2010, Farris represented the plaintiffs in Clemons, John T., Et Al. v. Dept. of Commerce, Et Al., which was dismissed on appeal to the Supreme Court. Apportionment.us brought the case in attempt to apply the "One Man, One Vote" principle of Baker v. Carr to the relative size of congressional districts across state lines. That would have had the effect of expanding the size of the United States House of Representatives beyond its current 435 members.

Along with Mark Meckler, Farris was co-founder of the Convention of States Project, founded in 2013 to encourage a convention to propose amendments to the Constitution. He served as senior fellow for constitutional studies for the project's parent organization, Citizens for Self-Governance, and as a member of CSG's legal board of reference.

In June 2016, Farris wrote op-ed in the Washington Post criticizing presumptive Republican presidential nominee Donald Trump from a principled conservative evangelical Christian position (see: Never Trump movement): "Trump most clearly fails the traditional standard championed by the Christian right on the subject of personal character." He concluded the piece by refusing to fall in line and vote for Trump.

Now, we’re being asked to give up our character and just vote Republican. That may be the choice of many voters, but it’s not why evangelicals like me got involved in politics. I, for one, won’t do it. Neither candidate qualifies as the lesser of the two evils.

In 2017, Alliance Defending Freedom announced that Farris would become its CEO and general counsel.

After Donald Trump lost the 2020 presidential election and refused to concede while making claims of fraud, Farris worked behind the scenes in his personal capacity on legal documents filed by Texas attorney general Ken Paxton to overturn the election results (Texas v. Pennsylvania).

On October 1, 2022, Kristen Waggoner succeeded Farris as CEO and president of ADF, retaining her role as general counsel.

Farris received the 2021 Boniface Award from the Association of Classical Christian Schools, given to recognize "a public figure who has stood faithfully for Christian truth, beauty, and goodness with grace."

== Personal life ==
He married in 1971 and has ten children and many grandchildren.

Party political offices
Preceded by Edwina P. Dalton	Republican nominee for Lieutenant Governor of Virginia; 1993	Succeeded by John Hager
Academic offices
New office	President of Patrick Henry College; 2000–2006	Succeeded by Graham Walker
New office	Chancellor of Patrick Henry College; 2006–present	Incumbent
