= American Opportunity =

American economic policy and education think tank

Coordinates: 38°48′51.6″N 77°02′40.5″W

- American Opportunity and Security
- Formation: 1977 (49 years ago)
- Founder: Paul Weyrich
- Founded at: Washington, DC
- Type: nonprofit
- Tax ID no.: 52-1096057
- Legal status: 501(c)(3)
- Purpose: economic policy and education
- Headquarters: Ste 206; 901 N Washington St; Alexandria, VA 22314-1535; United States
- CEO: Dan Kreske
- Key people: Jim Gilmore
- Website: americanopportunity.org

American Opportunity (formerly the Free Congress Research and Education Foundation) is a conservative think tank founded by Paul Weyrich. The full name of the organization is American Opportunity and Security (Note: IRS form 990EZ year 2018) but its DBA (Note: Doing-Business-As) name is American Opportunity Foundation. (Note: IRS form 990EZ year 2016) Based in Alexandria Virginia it is a nonprofit (Note: IRS 501(c)(3)) research and education organization. From 2010 through 2018 the organization had been headed by former Governor of Virginia Jim Gilmore. The current CEO (starting in 2019) is Dan Kreske (a close associate of Jim Gilmore).

== Activities ==
Under Weyrich, the foundation focused on cultural concerns, such as forming the "next conservatism", anti-abortion, public transportation concerns, and Fourth-generation warfare. Under Gilmore, with the aid of former Reagan-era Department of the Treasury official Gary Robbins, American Opportunity has focused on lowering taxes across the board, with the aim of completely removing all taxes on shareholder dividends and capital gains, as well as removing the inheritance tax entirely.
