= Fairfax Memorial Park =

Cemetery in Virginia, United States

Coordinates: 38.832293°N 77.285781°W

- Interactive map of Fairfax Memorial Park

Details
- Established: 1957
- Location: Fairfax, Virginia

Fairfax Memorial Park is a cemetery in Fairfax, Virginia. The cemetery was founded in 1957 by Cornelius H. Doherty, Sr.

The cemetery was opened in 1969 to provide space for Catholics in the area who required a Catholic burial, but it is now a secular cemetery. The cemetery, along with its associated funeral home, is now owned by Houston-based conglomerate, Carriage Services.

== Notable burials ==
- Robert Bork (March 1, 1927–December 19, 2012), Solicitor General of the United States (1973 to 1977) and Judge on the United States Court of Appeals for the District of Columbia Circuit (1982 to 1988)
- Clint Hill (January 4, 1932 – February 21, 2025), United States Secret Service (1958 to 1975), famously was the first responding agent during the assassination of President John F. Kennedy where he leaped onto the back of the presidential limousine to shield First Lady Jacqueline Kennedy with his body.
- Antonin Scalia (March 11, 1936–February 13, 2016): United States Supreme Court Associate Justice (1986 to 2016)
- William L. Scott (July 1, 1915–February 14, 1997), U.S. Congressman (1967 to 1973) and U.S. Senator (1973 to 1979)
- Paul Weyrich (October 7, 1942–December 18, 2008), American conservative activist, co-founder of The Heritage Foundation, the Free Congress Foundation, and the American Legislative Exchange Council

== See also ==
- List of burial places of justices of the Supreme Court of the United States
