= William S. Lind =

American military writer

- Born: July 9, 1947 (age 79); Cleveland, Ohio, United States
- Other name: Thomas Hobbes
- Education: Dartmouth College; Princeton University
- Occupation: Writer
- Known for: Fourth-generation warfare, conservative commentary

William S. Lind (born July 9, 1947) is an American conservative author, described as being aligned with paleoconservatism. He is the author of many books and one of the first proponents of fourth-generation warfare (4GW) theory and is director of the American Conservative Center for Public Transportation. He used the pseudonym Thomas Hobbes in a column for The American Conservative.

== Early life and education ==
Lind graduated from Dartmouth College in 1969 and from Princeton University in 1971, where he received a master's degree in history.

== Political and activist career ==
In 1973, having grown tired of doctoral work at Princeton, Lind wrote to Senator Robert Taft Jr., a Republican from Ohio, requesting his help in securing a job with Amtrak. In response, Taft instead offered Lind a job in his office, where he eventually began analyzing defense policy (Taft was a member of the United States Senate Committee on Armed Services).

Lind served as a legislative aide for Taft from 1973 through 1976 and held a similar position with Senator Gary Hart, a Democrat from Colorado, from 1977 to 1986.

=== Writing on warfare ===
Lind is the author of the Maneuver Warfare Handbook (Westview Press, 1985) and co-author, with Hart, of America Can Win: The Case for Military Reform.

In 1989, alongside several U.S. military officers, Lind helped to originate fourth-generation war (4GW) theory.

Lind has written for the Marine Corps Gazette, Defense and the National Interest, and The American Conservative.

According to the book Boyd: The Fighter Pilot Who Changed the Art of War by the writer Robert Coram, Lind was doing lectures on maneuver warfare sometimes criticized for having never served in the military and for having "never dodged a bullet, he had never led men in combat, he had never even worn a uniform."

=== Free Congress Foundation ===
Lind was the director of the Center for Cultural Conservatism at the Free Congress Foundation from 1986 to 2009. He advocates a Declaration of Cultural Independence by cultural conservatives in the United States and believes that the federal government ceased to represent their interests and began to coerce them into negative behavior and to affect their culture in a negative fashion. The foundation believes that American culture and its institutions are headed for a collapse and that cultural conservatives should separate themselves from that calamity. It also supports setting up independent parallel institutions with a right to secession and a highly decentralized nature that would rely on individual responsibility and discipline to remain intact but prevent the takeover of the institutions by those hostile to cultural conservatism.

Lind has authored and co-authored (with Paul Weyrich) monographs on behalf of the Free Congress Foundation that attempt to persuade American conservatives to support government funding for mass transit programs, especially urban rail transit. Lind was associate publisher of a quarterly magazine called The New Electric Railway Journal from its launch in 1988 to 1996, and from January 1994, he also co-hosted a monthly program about light rail on the National Empowerment Television network; the program used the same name as the magazine.

Lind and Weyrich popularized the Cultural Marxism conspiracy theory as being an organized conspiracy against what Lind views as the traditional Christian values of America, as described by the Southern Poverty Law Center (SPLC). As a paleoconservative, Lind has often criticized neoconservatives in his commentaries. While not a libertarian, he has also written for LewRockwell.com. He is a self-proclaimed conservative and monarchist. He is a supporter of a non-interventionist foreign policy.

In his column of December 15, 2009, Lind announced that he was leaving the staff of the Center unexpectedly and that his series of articles was on hiatus.

=== "Cultural Marxism" ===
In a 1994 article with two Marine reservists published in the Marine Corps Gazette, Lind wrote that "next real war we fight is likely to be on American soil", blaming "a new ideology, usually known as 'multiculturalism' or 'political correctness,' that is in essence Marxism translated from economic into social and cultural terms". Analyzing military alienation in 1997, the journalist Thomas E. Ricks wrote that Lind's rhetoric of Marxist cultural subversion was different from the "standard right-wing American rhetoric of the '90s".

In 2002, Lind gave a speech at a Holocaust deniers conference organized by Willis Carto, accusing a small number of all-Jewish leftist intellectuals of poisoning American culture, according to the SPLC.

A 2003 SPLC report said that Lind was the principal promoter and popularizer of the Cultural Marxism conspiracy theory, which claims that a coterie of Jewish-German philosophers, the Frankfurt School, had seized control of American popular culture, and have been systematically subverting Christian churches and ethics within the US. The conspiracists' preoccupation with the Jewishness of most Frankfurt School intellectuals is seen as confirming that Cultural Marxism is an antisemitic canard. The SPLC reported that in 1999 Lind wrote, "The real damage to race relations in the South came, not from slavery, but [from] Reconstruction, which would not have occurred if the South had won [the civil war]."

Lind wrote the fiction book Victoria: A Novel of 4th Generation War in which a group of "Christian Marines" leads an armed resistance against Cultural Marxism as the US federal government collapses.

== Reception and influence ==
In The Future of Freedom: Illiberal Democracy at Home and Abroad (2003), Fareed Zakaria said, "There are those in the West who agree with bin Laden that Islam is the reason for the Middle East's turmoil. Preachers such as Pat Robertson and Jerry Falwell Sr., and writers such as Paul Johnson and William Lind have made the case that Islam is a religion of repression and backwardness."

The manifesto of Anders Breivik is built around Lind's theory on cultural Marxism and contains 27 pages taken directly from his writings.
