= The New Electric Railway Journal =

American rail transport magazine

- Editor: Richard R. Kunz
- Categories: Urban public transportation, mainly rail
- Frequency: Quarterly
- First issue: Autumn 1988
- Final issue: Winter 1998 (published January 1999)
- Country: United States
- Based in: Washington, DC
- ISSN: 1048-3845

The New Electric Railway Journal (ISSN 1048-3845) was a quarterly American magazine primarily about electric urban rail transit in North America, published from 1988 to 1998, with an international circulation. Its name was a tribute to a much earlier magazine with similar coverage, the Electric Railway Journal, established in 1884 and published until 1931.

== Publication history ==
The first issue was that dated Autumn 1988. The magazine was published by the Free Congress Research and Education Foundation (FCF) for most of its run, from 1988 until mid-1996. Starting with the Summer 1996 issue, publication was transferred to CityRail, Ltd., a not-for-profit corporation based in Illinois. The magazine abbreviated its own name as TNERJ (as opposed to "NERJ").

The magazine's publisher was Paul M. Weyrich, a noted American conservative and FCF's founder and president. Weyrich was a longtime advocate of light rail transit and streetcars. As TNERJ publisher, he penned an opinion column for every issue, and he acknowledged that it was unusual for an American political conservative to support government investment in mass transit, but in the magazine he explained why he believed support for urban transit, and particularly rail transit, made sense and did not run counter to what he considered a "proper definition of conservatism." In the magazine's premiere issue, Weyrich wrote that he was "committed to rail transit" and that "rail transit – all but abandoned in the 1950s as yesteryear's mode of transportation – is back in a major way all across the nation." He also made it clear that, while the magazine's commentary sections would generally be advocating investment in rail transit, he and the editors would not hesitate to criticize existing or proposed rail-transit systems when they believed criticism was deserved.

Editor-in-chief of TNERJ for its entire run was Richard R. Kunz, who had previously worked as Rail Transit Editor of Passenger Train Journal.

Modes of transportation covered by The New Electric Railway Journal included light rail transit, streetcars, rapid transit (subway/metro) systems, commuter rail, trolley buses and, to a more limited extent, monorails and people-movers. The change to a different publishing company in 1996 did not change the magazine's focus, as the editor-in-chief and most other contributing editors remained the same.

Publication ceased in late 1998, when the issue carrying the date of "Winter 1998" was published, as a result primarily of the death of the editor, Richard Kunz.

== Content overview ==
Each issue generally included about three or four feature articles, plus a news section reporting on recent developments by city, on the aforementioned modes of transportation. Regular geographic coverage extended to Canada and Mexico as well as the United States, but most issues also had a page or two of non-North American content, occasionally several pages.

Issues were 46–50 pages in length until 1994, thereafter 38–40 pages. The magazine used high-quality paper, and over half of its pages were printed in color. In some issues, 100% of the illustrations were in color.

=== Opinion columns ===
Along with publisher Weyrich and editor Kunz, others who contributed opinion columns – generally about one page in length each – on a regular basis included associate publisher William S. Lind and George Krambles, a former executive director of the Chicago Transit Authority (1976–1980).

=== Periodic features ===
Certain features were included only about once a year. In the Spring issue, a one- to three-page feature called "Status Report" included a table listing all cities in North America served by electric transit, indicating which modes each had, and a calendar with projected dates of future significant developments, such as the opening of a new light rail system or line. The annual Status Report and calendar were accompanied by a feature called "Rating the Rails", in which every electric urban transit operation (including the continent's then-eleven trolley bus systems) was given a performance rating on a scale of 1 to 5 by the editorial team, with 1 defined as "poor; multiple major problems" and 5 as "superior performance" in the original 1-to-5 scale, which was changed to a 1-to-10 scale in 1990. Accompanying comments explained the editors' rationale in cases of very low or very high ratings, or whenever a particular system's rating had changed from the previous edition of the list. One review of TNERJ in a British magazine said "the worth of" the annual Status Report and Rating the Rails features "seems a little questionable", but overall called the magazine "attractively produced", with "high standards" of editing.

Once per year, the editorial team selected a notable person working professionally in the North American transit industry, for the honor of "Man of the Year". The award was given to someone deemed to have "made a significant positive contribution to the electric transit industry" in North America. Among the recipients was David Gunn, who had managed large transit systems in Philadelphia, New York City, Washington, D.C., and Toronto. The 1995 recipient was female, so honoree Shirley DeLibero was appropriately referred to as TNERJ's "Woman of the Year".

In a 1989 review of the magazine, Railfan & Railroad called TNERJ "one of the most worthwhile new products to enter the already saturated rail publication field", noting its "attractive color and black & white photos, maps and responsible writing".

== Beyond the printed magazine ==
The American Public Transportation Association transcribed most of TNERJ's 1992–1998 articles about heritage streetcar systems or topics onto its Heritage Trolley website, where they remain available in 2017.

Starting in January 1994, a monthly television show using the same name as the magazine began airing on the then-new National Empowerment Television satellite network, co-hosted by the magazine's associate publisher, Bill Lind, concerning the same topics as the magazine. The program aired on the last Sunday of each month.

As CityRail, Ltd., prepared to take over publication of the printed magazine, a supplementary digital newsletter called "CityRail" became available by email, offering greater detail of news coverage and more frequent reporting (monthly), as a separate subscription.

In early 2000, a little over one year after TNERJ ceased publication, its former publisher Paul Weyrich launched a website to provide a place for continued commentary and news reporting on electric rail transit, which he called "The New New Electric Railway Journal". Weyrich and former TNERJ associate publisher William Lind were regular contributors to the website. The site remained active until 2009 (Weyrich died in December 2008).

== See also ==
- List of railroad-related periodicals
