= 1972 Virginia ballot measures =

The 1972 Virginia State Elections took place on Election Day, November 7, 1972, the same day as the U.S. Presidential, U.S. Senate, U.S. House elections in the state. The only statewide elections on the ballot were two constitutional referendums to amend the Virginia State Constitution. All referendums were referred to the voters by the Virginia General Assembly.

== Question 1 ==
This amendment asked voters to reduce the minimum age for qualified voters of the State from 21 to 18. This amendment was introduced in order to synchronize Virginia State Constitution with the U.S. Constitution following the recent passage of the 26th Amendment in 1971.

Question 1
Choice	Votes	%
For	765,635	76.22
Against	238,937	23.78
Total	1,004,572	100.00
Source: - Official Results

== Question 2 ==
This amendment asked voters to extend in the legal definition of "city" to any incorporated community which became a city as provided by law before 12 P.M. on July 1, 1971.

Question 2
Choice	Votes	%
For	679,025	78.04
Against	191,073	21.96
Total	870,098	100.00
Source: - Official Results
