= William L. Scott =

American politician (1915–1997)

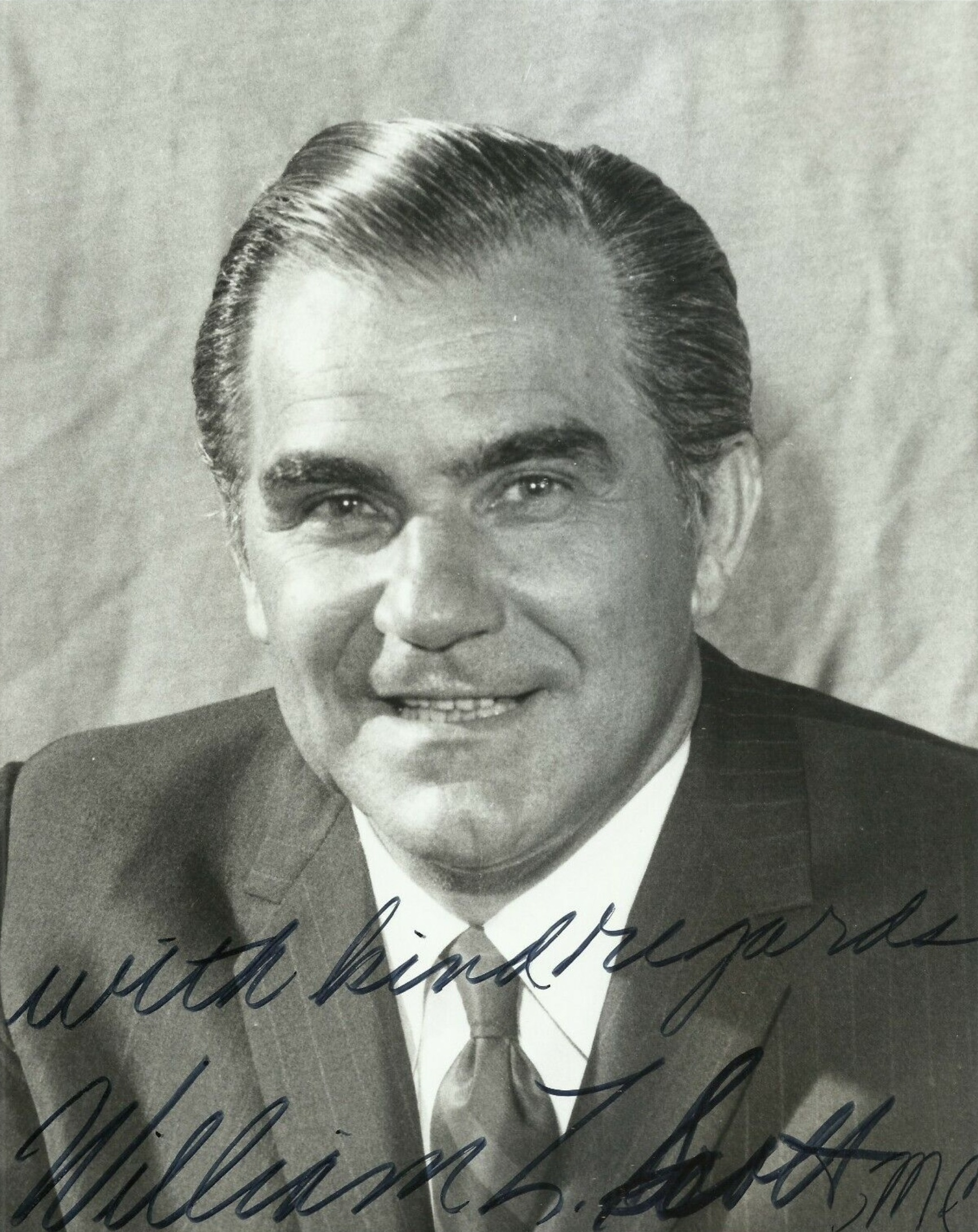
- Official portrait of Scott; c. 1969

United States Senator from Virginia
- In office January 3, 1973 – January 1, 1979
- Preceded by: William B. Spong Jr.
- Succeeded by: John Warner

Member of the U.S. House of Representatives from Virginia's 8th district
- In office January 3, 1967 – January 3, 1973
- Preceded by: Howard W. Smith
- Succeeded by: Stanford Parris

Personal details
- Born: William Lloyd Scott; July 1, 1915 Williamsburg, Virginia, U.S.
- Died: February 14, 1997 (aged 81) Fairfax Station, Virginia, U.S.
- Resting place: Fairfax Memorial Park
- Party: Republican
- Spouse: Ruth Inez Huffman (m. 1940)
- Children: 3
- Education: National University School of Law (LLB, LLM)
- Profession: Attorney

Military service
- Branch/service: United States Army
- Years of service: 1945
- Rank: Private
- Battles/wars: World War II

William Lloyd Scott (July 1, 1915 – February 14, 1997) was an American attorney and politician from the Commonwealth of Virginia. A Republican, he served in both the United States House of Representatives and United States Senate.

A native of Williamsburg, Virginia, Scott graduated from high school in St. Albans, West Virginia and began a career with the US Government Printing Office (now the United States Government Publishing Office). After completing LL.B. and LL.M. degrees at National University School of Law (now George Washington University Law School) in 1938 and 1939, he was admitted to the bar and worked as an attorney for the United States Department of Justice. In early 1945, he enlisted in the United States Army for World War II, and he served until the end of the war, receiving his discharge later that year.

In 1963 and 1965, Scott was an unsuccessful Republican candidate for the Virginia Senate. In 1966, he was a successful candidate for the U.S. House of Representatives. He was re-elected twice and served from 1967 to 1973. In 1972, he was elected to the U.S. Senate, the first Republican to win a Senate seat in Virginia since the end of Reconstruction. He served one term, 1973 to 1979. During his congressional service, Scott made headlines over frequent allegations of incompetence and racism.

After leaving the Senate, Scott retired to Fairfax Station, Virginia. He died in Fairfax, Virginia on February 14, 1997, and was buried at Fairfax Memorial Park in Fairfax.

== Early life ==
William L. Scott was born in Williamsburg, Virginia on July 1, 1915, the son of William David Scott and Nora Belle (Ingram) Scott. He graduated from high school in St. Albans, West Virginia and began a career with the Government Printing Office. He received an LL.B. from National University School of Law (now George Washington University Law School) in 1938 and an LL.M. in 1939. Scott was admitted to the bar, and was employed as a trial attorney with the Department of Justice until 1961.

Scott served in the United States Army during World War II, enlisting as a private in April 1945, and receiving his discharge later the same year as a result of the end of the war. He was later active in the American Legion.

He engaged in the private practice of law in Fairfax, Virginia from 1961 to 1966. In 1963 and 1965 he ran unsuccessfully for a seat in the Virginia State Senate. In 1965 he initially appeared to have won, but a recount showed that he had lost by 21 votes.

== United States House ==
Scott won the Republican nomination for Virginia's 8th congressional district in 1966. He expected to face 18-term incumbent and House Rules Committee chairman Howard W. Smith, a conservative Democrat, but Smith lost renomination to a more liberal Democrat, State Delegate George Rawlings. With support from conservative Democrats as well as Republicans, Scott handily defeated Rawlings in November. He was easily re-elected twice, and served from January 3, 1967 to January 3, 1973.

During his U.S. House service, Scott was appointed to the Committee on Post Office and Civil Service and the Committee on Veterans' Affairs. In February 1967, Scott was chosen to present the House's annual reading of Washington's Farewell Address; he was chosen for this event in part because his district included Washington's Mount Vernon home. Other initiatives and pet projects Scott advocated included a return to "old time" Independence Day celebrations.

== United States Senate ==
In 1972, Scott won the Republican nomination for the United States Senate and defeated Democratic incumbent William B. Spong Jr. in a close race, making Scott the first Republican Senator from Virginia since Reconstruction. Scott benefited from Richard Nixon's landslide victory in that year's presidential election, with Nixon winning Virginia by almost 38 points and carrying all but one county-level jurisdiction.

Scott served one term, January 3, 1973 to January 1, 1979. He did not run for re-election in 1978, and resigned two days before the end of his term. Scott's resignation enabled the Governor of Virginia to appoint the winner of the 1978 Senate election, John Warner, to fill the vacancy, giving Warner one day of seniority over other senators who were elected in 1978. During his Congressional service, Scott was criticized for excessive expenses incurred during his fact-finding trips abroad.

=== Racism and antisemitism ===
When addressing the implementation of the Post Office's ZIP Code program in 1973, Scott criticized the initiative by saying "the only reason we need zip codes is because niggers can't read."

In addition, his name appeared in an exposé of Congressional staff hiring practices as one of the members who had given "No Blacks" and other similar instructions to the Capitol Hill Placement Bureau. Scott was also alleged to have displayed antisemitism while in Congress. One news report indicated that during a job interview, Scott was told that the applicant was Jewish, and replied "Oh, I've got too many of them here now to hire you."

=== "Dumbest Member of Congress" ===
A 1974 article in New Times by Nina Totenberg reported that Scott had been ranked at the top of the list of "The Ten Dumbest Members of Congress".

Scott's critics cited many examples to support this claim. While being briefed about the military capabilities of the Union of Soviet Socialist Republics, Scott reportedly confused missile silos for grain silos and said "Wait a minute! I'm not interested in agriculture. I want the military stuff." In addition, 1975 press accounts of a trip he took to the Middle East stated that Scott was a "diplomat's nightmare" who mistook the Suez Canal for the Persian Gulf, refused to enter a mosque because it wasn't "a Christian building", and asked Israeli Prime Minister Yitzhak Rabin "What is this Gaza stuff? I have never understood that." Scott held a press conference to deny the claims of the New Times story, which had the effect of giving the allegation wider circulation and enhanced credibility.

In 2000 and afterward, journalist Harry Stein, who had provided much of the background information to Totenberg based on an earlier Stein article that he now considers a "hit piece", agreed with Scott's assessment at the time that the articles were written by "some left-wing kids from Richmond with an agenda." Stein wrote that at the time of the Totenberg article, Scott was a tempting target because he was roundly disliked by his colleagues and his staff, and widely regarded as incompetent.

== Retirement and death ==
In retirement Scott resided in Fairfax Station, Virginia. In his later years he suffered from Alzheimer's disease and resided in a Fairfax nursing center. Scott died in Fairfax on February 14, 1997, and was interred at Fairfax Memorial Park in Fairfax.

Party political offices
Preceded by James P. Ould Jr.	Republican nominee for U.S. Senator from Virginia (Class 2); 1972	Succeeded by Richard D. Obenshain
U.S. House of Representatives
Preceded by Howard W. Smith	Member of the U.S. House of Representatives from Virginia's 8th congressional district January 3, 1967 – January 3, 1973	Succeeded by Stanford E. Parris
U.S. Senate
Preceded by William B. Spong Jr.	U.S. senator (Class 2) from Virginia; January 3, 1973 – January 1, 1979; Served alongside: Harry F. Byrd Jr.	Succeeded by John W. Warner
