= William Spong Jr. =

American politician from Virginia (1920-1997)

William B. Spong Jr.
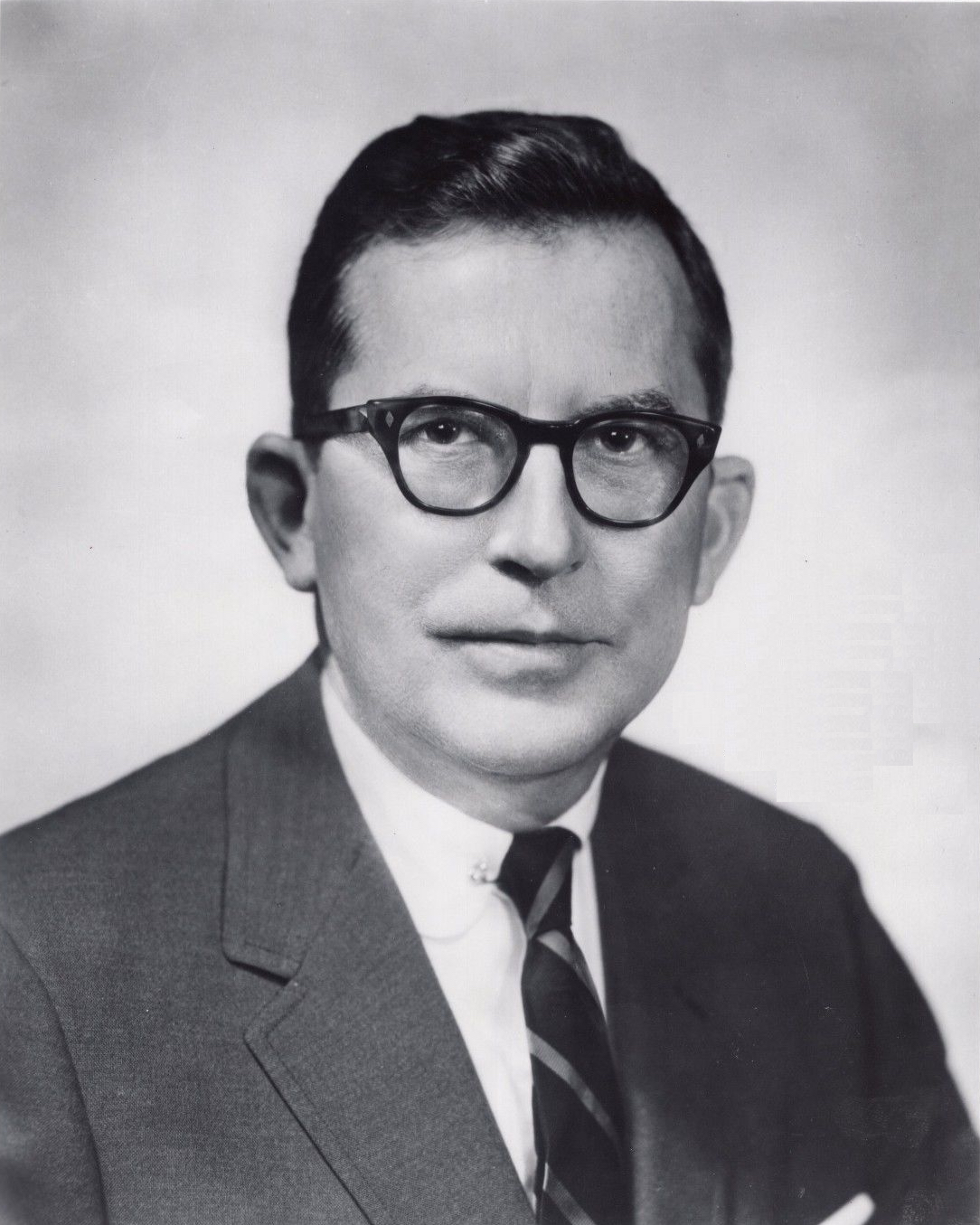

17th Dean of William & Mary Law School
- In office 1976–1985
- Preceded by: James P. Whyte Jr.
- Succeeded by: Timothy J. Sullivan

United States Senator from Virginia
- In office December 31, 1966 – January 3, 1973
- Preceded by: A. Willis Robertson
- Succeeded by: William L. Scott

Member of the Virginia Senate from the 3rd district
- In office January 12, 1966 – December 31, 1966 Serving with William Hodges & William Kellam
- Preceded by: Gordon F. Marsh
- Succeeded by: Willard J. Moody

Member of the Virginia Senate from the 10th district
- In office January 11, 1956 – January 12, 1966
- Preceded by: James D. Hagood
- Succeeded by: Edward E. Willey

Member of the Virginia House of Delegates from Portsmouth City
- In office January 13, 1954 – January 11, 1956 Serving with John A. MacKenzie
- Preceded by: R. Winston Bain
- Succeeded by: Willard J. Moody

Personal details
- Born: William Belser Spong Jr. September 29, 1920 Portsmouth, Virginia, U.S.
- Died: October 8, 1997 (aged 77) Portsmouth, Virginia, U.S.
- Party: Democratic
- Spouse: Virginia Wise Galliford
- Education: Hampden–Sydney College; University of Virginia; University of Edinburgh
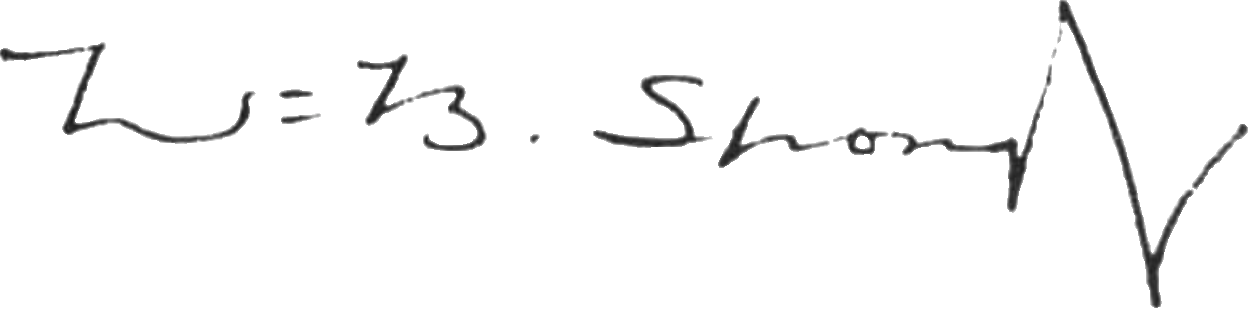
- Signature

Military service
- Branch/service: United States Army; Army Air Forces
- Years of service: 1942–1945
- Unit: 93rd Bombardment Group
- Battles/wars: World War II

William Belser Spong Jr. (September 29, 1920 – October 8, 1997) was an American Democratic Party politician and a United States senator who represented the state of Virginia from 1966 to 1973.

== Biography ==
=== Early life and education ===
Spong was born in Portsmouth, Virginia, and attended public schools, Hampden–Sydney College in Hampden Sydney, the University of Virginia in Charlottesville, and the University of Edinburgh in Scotland. He studied law, and was admitted to the bar in 1947, commencing practice in Portsmouth soon thereafter. During World War II, Spong served in the Army Air Corps, Eighth Air Force from 1942 to 1945. After the war, Spong was a lecturer in law and government at the College of William and Mary from 1948 to 1949.

=== State politics ===
Spong entered Virginia politics as a member of the Virginia House of Delegates from 1954 to 1955, and afterwards as a member of the Virginia State Senate from 1956 to 1966. While in the Senate, Spong was chairman of the Virginia Commission on Public Education from 1958 to 1962.

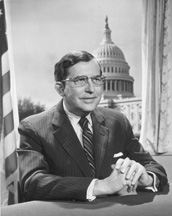
Spong during his tenure in the U.S. Senate

=== National politics ===
In 1966, Spong was personally recruited by President Lyndon Johnson to mount a primary challenge against 20-year incumbent Senator A. Willis Robertson. Johnson was angered at Robertson's opposition to the Civil Rights and Voting Rights Acts. Spong defeated Robertson in one of the biggest upsets in Virginia political history and breezed to victory in November. Robertson resigned on December 31, 1966; Governor Mills Godwin appointed Spong to the seat, giving Spong higher seniority than other senators elected that November. Spong's primary victory marked the beginning of the end of the Byrd Organization's long dominance of Virginia politics. Spong's Senate career was short-lived; in 1972, he was narrowly defeated for reelection by 8th District Representative William L. Scott.

Spong would be the last Democrat elected to the Senate from Virginia until Chuck Robb's victory in 1988. Spong's Senate colleague, Harry F. Byrd Jr., became an independent in 1970.

=== Later life and death ===
After his Senate career, Spong returned to the practice of law, and also served as a law professor and the dean of the Marshall-Wythe School of Law at the College of William and Mary from 1976 to 1985. In 1976, Spong was president of the Virginia Bar Association. He was appointed interim president of Old Dominion University in 1988, and was a resident of Portsmouth until his death. He is interred at the University of Virginia Cemetery in Charlottesville, Virginia.

== Personal life ==
=== Humor ===
A popular Internet joke claims that William B. Spong of Virginia and Hiram Fong of Hawaii sponsored a bill recommending the mass ringing of church bells to welcome the arrival in Hong Kong of the U.S. Table Tennis Team after its tour of Communist China. The bill failed to pass, cheating the Senate out of passing the Spong-Fong Hong Kong Ping Pong Ding Dong Bell Bill.

In fact, Senator Spong never sponsored such a bill, but he did have some fun with the press soon after arriving in Washington, D.C. As described in an article by his cousin, the Rt. Rev. John Shelby Spong, Senator Spong:

was invited with the other freshman senators to address the National Press Club. Fearful that someone on radio or television would call him Senator Sponge, he used his brief five-minute introductory speech to that body to secure proper name identification. His first act as a senator, he announced in his southern drawl, would be to introduce a bill to protect the rights of songwriters in Hong Kong. He would be joined in this effort by the senior senator of Louisiana, Russell Long, and the senior senator from Hawaii, Hiram Fong, and together they would present the Long Fong Spong Hong Kong Song Bill. His name was never mispronounced by members of the media.

Other sources crediting Spong with the humorous bill name suggest different contexts.

=== Family ===
Spong married Virginia Wise Galliford. They had two children, Martha and Tom.

Party political offices
Preceded by A. Willis Robertson	Democratic nominee for U.S. Senator from Virginia (Class 2); 1966, 1972	Succeeded by Andrew P. Miller
U.S. Senate
Preceded by A. Willis Robertson	U.S. senator (Class 2) from Virginia; December 31, 1966 – January 3, 1973; Served alongside: Harry F. Byrd Jr.	Succeeded by William L. Scott
Academic offices
Preceded by James P. Whyte Jr.	Dean of the College of William & Mary Law School; 1976–1985	Succeeded by Timothy J. Sullivan
Preceded by Dr. Joseph M. Marchello	President of Old Dominion University; 1989–1990	Succeeded by Dr. James V. Koch
