= James P. Whyte Jr. =

American lawyer

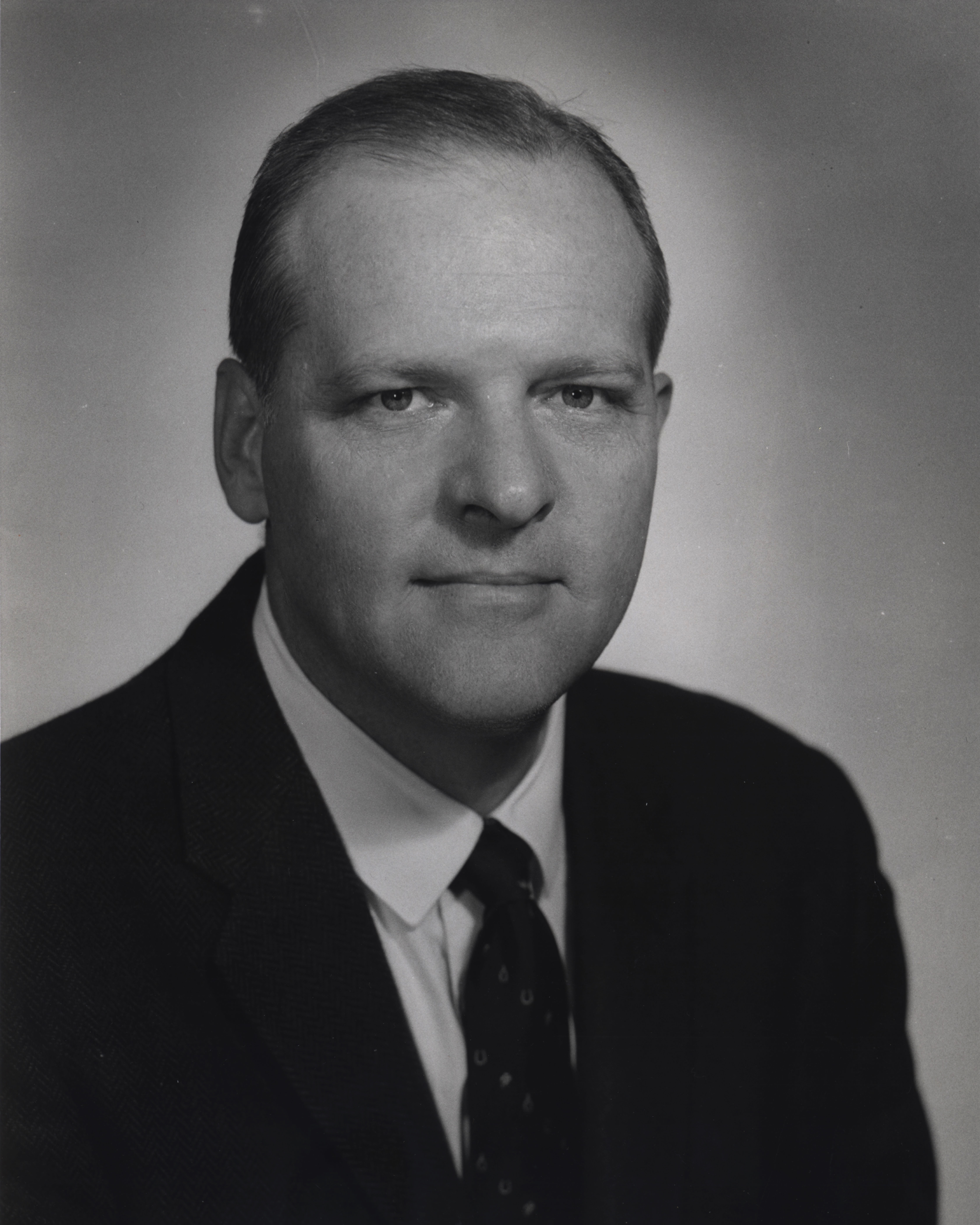
- Portrait of Whyte, 1975

16th Dean of William & Mary Law School
- In office 1969–1975
- Acting; 1969–1970
- Preceded by: Joseph Curtis
- Succeeded by: William B. Spong Jr.

Personal details
- Born: James Primrose Whyte Jr. August 25, 1921 Columbus, Mississippi, U.S.
- Died: January 7, 2007 (aged 85) Williamsburg, Virginia, U.S.
- Spouse: Martha Ann Jones
- Education: Bucknell University (AB); Syracuse University (MA); University of Colorado (LLB)

Military service
- Branch/service: United States Navy
- Years of service: 1943–1946 (active); 1946–1967 (reserve)
- Rank: Commander
- Battles/wars: World War II; Pacific theater

James Primrose Whyte Jr. (August 25, 1921 – January 7, 2007) was an American attorney and educator. He was a professor at William & Mary Law School and served as the school's dean from 1965 until his resignation to return to full-time teaching in 1975.

Academic offices
Preceded by Joseph Curtis	Dean of the College of William & Mary Law School; 1969–1975	Succeeded by William B. Spong Jr.
