= Cultural Marxism conspiracy theory =

Far-right antisemitic conspiracy theory

Cultural Marxism is a far-right and antisemitic conspiracy theory that misrepresents Western Marxism (especially the Frankfurt School) as being responsible for modern progressive movements, identity politics, and political correctness. The conspiracy theory posits that there is an ongoing and intentional academic and intellectual effort to subvert Western society via a planned culture war which undermines supposed Christian values of traditionalist conservatism and seeks to replace them with culturally progressive values.

The contemporary version (Note: In its dominant iteration, the US-originating conspiracy holds that a small group of Marxist critical theorists have conspired to destroy Western civilisation by taking over key cultural institutions.) of the conspiracy theory originated in the United States during the 1990s and takes inspiration from the Nazi propaganda term "Cultural Bolshevism". Originally found only on the far-right political fringe, the term began to enter mainstream discourse in the 2010s and is now found globally. The conspiracy theory of a Marxist culture war is promoted by right-wing politicians, fundamentalist religious leaders, political commentators in mainstream print and television media, and white supremacist terrorists, and has been described as "a foundational element of the alt-right worldview". Scholarly analysis of the conspiracy theory has concluded that it has no basis in fact.

== Origins ==
The phrase "cultural Marxism" to mean a cultural attack from the left aimed at destroying society and installing Marxism/Bolshevism can be traced back to the 1930s, appearing in the 1938 July–September volume of "British Union Quarterly", the journal of The British Union of Fascists. The short essay claims the source of cultural Marxism is the "deracinated" nature of "city-dwelling", and the "indiscriminate toleration-psychosis of liberalism, inherent in Social-Democracy".

European reactionaries, following their defeat in the culture wars of the 1960s against liberals and Marxists, split from the mainstream conservatism of the "Old Right", forming a loose intellectual grouping (the "New Right") that criticised the contemporaneous society and attempted to transform cultural norms and values. In the 21st century, The European New Right influenced the US alt-right to focus on nonviolent ways to delegitimize the liberal status quo. This included criticising the perceived decline of Western culture and the influence of pop culture, which they claimed was the result of a collusion between capitalism and what they called "Cultural Marxism".

=== Michael Minnicino and the LaRouche Movement ===
Michael Minnicino's 1992 essay New Dark Age: The Frankfurt School and 'Political Correctness' has been described as a starting point for the contemporary conspiracy theory in the United States. Minnicino's interest in the subject derived from his involvement in the LaRouche movement. Lyndon LaRouche had begun developing conspiracy theories regarding the Frankfurt School in 1974, when he alleged that Herbert Marcuse and Angela Davis were acting as part of COINTELPRO. Other features of the conspiracy theory had developed across the 1970s and 80s in the movement's magazine, EIR, according to the researcher Andrew Woods.

Minnicino's essay argued that late twentieth-century America had become a "New Dark Age" as a result of the abandonment of Judeo-Christian and Renaissance ideals, which he claimed had been replaced in modern art with a "tyranny of ugliness". He attributed this to an alleged plot to instill cultural pessimism in America, carried out in three stages by Georg Lukács, the Frankfurt School, and elite media figures and political campaigners.

Minnicino asserted there were two aspects of the Frankfurt School plan to destroy Western culture. Firstly, a cultural critique, by Theodor Adorno and Walter Benjamin, to use art and culture to promote alienation and replace Christianity with socialism. This included the development of opinion polling and advertising techniques to brainwash the populace and control political campaigning. Secondly, the plan supposedly included attacks on the traditional family structure by Herbert Marcuse and Erich Fromm to promote women's rights, sexual liberation, and polymorphous perversity to subvert patriarchal authority. (Note: On this point Minnicino speciously paraphrases Marcuse's 1965 essay on "Repressive Tolerance" in A Critique of Pure Tolerance. Minnicino incorrectly labels Marcuse's "Liberating tolerance…intolerance against movements from the Right, and tolerance of movements from the Left" as "repressive tolerance", which in Marcuse's essay respectively refers to "what is proclaimed and practiced as tolerance today, is in many of its most effective manifestations serving the cause of oppression".) Minnicino claimed the Frankfurt School was responsible for elements of the counterculture of the 1960s and a "psychedelic revolution", distributing hallucinogenic drugs to encourage sexual perversion and promiscuity.

After the 2011 terrorist attacks in Norway by Anders Breivik, a follower of the conspiracy theory, Minnicino repudiated his own essay. Minnicino wrote, "I still like to think that some of my research was validly conducted and useful. However, I see very clearly that the whole enterprise—and especially the conclusions—was hopelessly deformed by self-censorship and the desire to in some way support Mr. LaRouche's crack-brained world-view."

=== Paul Weyrich and William Lind ===
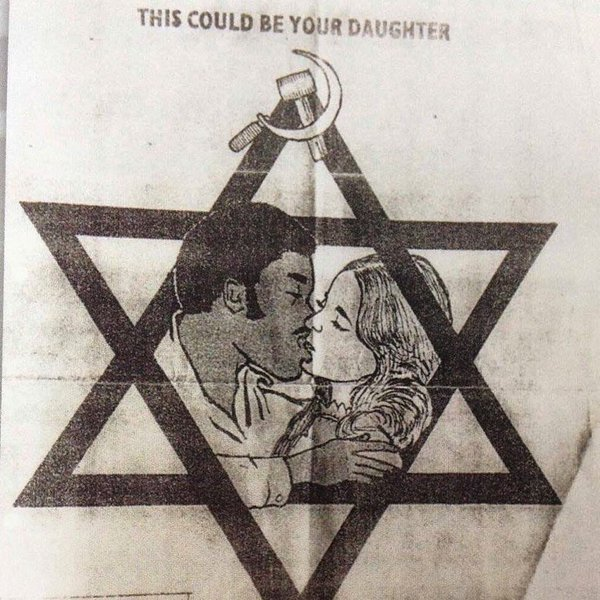
"This could be your Daughter", an antimiscegenation poster that associates miscegenation with communism and the Jews

Paul Weyrich and William Lind were prominent figures of cultural conservatism in the United States; Weyrich had co-founded right-wing groups including the Free Congress Foundation, which he led. Weyrich equated political correctness with Cultural Marxism in a speech to the Conservative Leadership Conference of the Civitas Institute in 1998. He argued that "we have lost the culture war" and that "a legitimate strategy for us to follow is to look at ways to separate ourselves from the institutions that have been captured by the ideology of Political Correctness, or by other enemies of our traditional culture".

For the Free Congress Foundation, Weyrich commissioned Lind, a "paleoconservative" activist, to write a history of Cultural Marxism, defined as "a brand of Western Marxism ... commonly known as 'multiculturalism' or, less formally, Political Correctness". In the 2000 speech The Origins of Political Correctness, Lind wrote, "If we look at it analytically, if we look at it historically, we quickly find out exactly what it is. Political correctness is cultural Marxism. It is Marxism translated from economic into cultural terms. It is an effort that goes back not to the 1960s and the Hippies and the peace movement, but back to World War I. If we compare the basic tenets of Political Correctness with classical Marxism, the parallels are very obvious."

Lind employed the conspiracy theory to argue that leftist and liberal ideologies were alien to the United States. He argued that Lukács and Antonio Gramsci had aimed to subvert Western culture because it was an obstacle to the Marxist goal of proletarian revolution. He alleged that the Frankfurt School under Max Horkheimer had hoped to destroy Western civilization and establish totalitarianism (even though some members had fled Nazi totalitarianism), using four main strategies. First, Lind said, Horkheimer's critical theory would undermine the authority of family and government while segregating society into opposing groups of victims and oppressors. Second, he said, concepts of the authoritarian personality and the F-scale measuring susceptibility to fascism, developed by Adorno, would be used to accuse Americans with right-wing views of having fascist principles. Third, he said, polymorphous perversity would undermine family structure by promoting free love and homosexuality. Fourth, he characterized Herbert Marcuse as saying that left victim-groups should be allowed to speak while groups on the right were silenced. Lind said that Marcuse considered a coalition of "Blacks, students, feminist women, and homosexuals" as a feasible vanguard of cultural revolution in the 1960s. Lind also wrote that Cultural Marxism was an example of fourth-generation warfare. In June 2002, Lind gave a talk at a conference put on by the Holocaust denial magazine, The Barnes Review.

Pat Buchanan brought more attention among paleoconservatives to Weyrich and Lind's iteration of the conspiracy theory. Jérôme Jamin refers to Buchanan as the "intellectual momentum" of the conspiracy theory, and to Anders Breivik as the "violent impetus". Both of them relied on Lind, who edited a multi-authored work called "Political Correctness: A Short History of an Ideology" that Jamin calls the core text that "has been unanimously cited as 'the' reference since 2004."

Lind and the Free Congress Foundation produced the video Political Correctness: The Frankfurt School in 1999. It was further distributed by the Council of Conservative Citizens, a white supremacist group, which added its own introduction. The film includes decontextualized clips of historian Martin Jay, who was not aware of the nature of the production at the time. Jay has since become a recognized expert on the conspiracy theory. Concerning right-wing exploitation of his statements, Jay wrote, "Those beans I allegedly spilled had been on the plate for a very long time", going on to confirm that the Frankfurt school were Marxists concerned with culture, and that Marcuse promulgated the idea of repressive tolerance. However, Jay says, the conspiracy theory presents an "impoverished cartoon version" of these ideas.

Jay wrote that Lind's documentary was effective Cultural Marxism propaganda because it "spawned a number of condensed, textual versions, which were reproduced on a number of radical, right-wing [web] sites." Jay further writes:

These, in turn, led to a plethora of new videos, now available on YouTube, which feature an odd cast of pseudo-experts regurgitating exactly the same line. The message is numbingly simplistic: All the 'ills' of modern American culture, from feminism, affirmative action, sexual liberation, racial equality, multiculturalism and gay rights to the decay of traditional education, and even environmentalism, are ultimately attributable to the insidious intellectual influence of the members of the Institute for Social Research who came to America in the 1930s.

Lind's documentary also features an interview from Lazlo Pasztor, a former member of the Hungarian Arrow Cross Party, who collaborated with the Nazis and later served five years in prison for crimes against humanity.

=== Others ===
David Solway sees a "master plan" in Marxist revolutionaries and Cultural Marxists advocating for or predicting the dissolution of marriage. The charge is that they have a "'master plan' for the overthrow of Western civilization from within, personified by those members of the Frankfurt School".

=== Popularization ===
Rachel Busbridge, Benjamin Moffitt and Joshua Thorburn describe the conspiracy theory as being promoted by the far-right, but note that it "has gained ground over the past quarter century"; they conclude that "[t]hrough the lens of the Cultural Marxist conspiracy, however, it is possible to discern a relationship of empowerment between mainstream and fringe, whereby certain talking points and tropes are able to be transmitted, taken up and adapted by 'mainstream' figures, thus giving credence and visibility to ideologies that would have previously been constrained to the margins."

Andrew Breitbart, founder of Breitbart News, authored a 2011 book Righteous Indignation: Excuse Me While I Save the World that represents one of the conspiracy theory's moves towards the mainstream. Breitbart's interpretation of the conspiracy is similar in most respects to that of Lind. Breitbart attributes the spread of the ideas of the Frankfurt School from universities to a wider audience to "trickledown intellectualism", and claims that Saul Alinsky introduced cultural Marxism to the masses in his 1971 handbook Rules for Radicals. Woods argues that Breitbart focuses on Alinsky in order to associate cultural Marxism with the modern Democratic Party, and Hillary Clinton. Breitbart claims that George Soros funds the alleged cultural Marxism project. Martin Jay wrote that Breitbart's book displayed "appalling ignorance" of the actual work of the Frankfurt School.

Breitbart News has published the idea that Theodor Adorno's atonal music was an attempt at inducing mental illness on a mass scale. Former Breitbart contributors Ben Shapiro and Charlie Kirk, founder of Turning Point USA, have promoted the conspiracy theory, especially the claim that Cultural Marxist activity is happening in universities.

In the late 2010s, Canadian clinical psychologist Jordan Peterson popularized the term, for example, by blaming "Cultural Marxism" for demanding the use of gender-neutral pronouns as a threat to free speech, thus moving the term into mainstream discourse. Critics state that Peterson misuses postmodernism as a stand-in term for the conspiracy without understanding its antisemitic implications, (Note: Peterson uses a variety of terms somewhat interchangeably, among them "postmodernism", "neo-Marxism" and "postmodern neo-Marxism", but almost never use the term "Cultural Marxism") specifying that "Peterson isn't an ideological anti-Semite; there's every reason to believe that when he re-broadcasts fascist propaganda, he doesn't even hear the dog-whistles he's emitting".

Journalist Ari Paul has criticized traditional media such as The New York Times, New York Magazine and The Washington Post for their coverage of the conspiracy theory, arguing that they have either not clarified the nature of the conspiracy theory or "allow[ed] it to live on their pages." An example is an article in The New York Times by David Brooks, who Paul argues "rebrands cultural Marxism as mere political correctness, giving the Nazi-inspired phrase legitimacy for the American right. It is dropped in or quoted in other stories—some of them lighthearted, like the fashion cues of the alt-right—without describing how fringe this notion is. It's akin to letting conspiracy theories about chem trails or vaccines get unearned space in mainstream press." Another is Andrew Sullivan, who went on "to denounce 'cultural Marxists' for inspiring social justice movements on campuses." Paul argues that failure to highlight the nature of the conspiracy theory "has bitter consequences" quoting Spencer Sunshine stating "It is legitimizing the use of that framework, and therefore it's coded antisemitism."

Supporters of the conspiracy theory include paleoconservative political philosopher Paul Gottfried. Gottfried was at one time a student of Herbert Marcuse (with whom he disagreed) and edited the academic journal Telos. Under Gottfried's tenure, Telos became far-right in its outlook, writing favorably about Carl Schmitt and Alain de Benoist. Gottfried influenced Richard Spencer and has been called the "godfather" of the alt-right. He defended William Lind against accusations that "Cultural Marxism" has antisemitic undertones. Gottfried identifies as reactionary and questions the value of political equality. Gottfried defines cultural Marxism as "a particular movement for change that combines some elements of Marxist socialism with a call for sexual and cultural revolution". However, he says that the term "cultural Marxism" is not ideal since the connection with Marxism is tenuous. Gottfried writes that the influence of the Frankfurt School lives on in modern left-wing politics mainly in the form of a tendency to conflate the right wing with fascism.

== Aspects ==
The conspiracy theory states that an elite of Marxist theorists and Frankfurt School intellectuals are subverting Western society. None of the Frankfurt School's members were part of any kind of international conspiracy to destroy Western civilization, and Horkheimer strictly prohibited members of the Frankfurt school from engaging in political activism in the United States. According to Marc Tuters, "the analysis of Marxism proffered by this literature would certainly not stand up to scrutiny by any serious historian of the subject." Conspiracy theorists misrepresent the nature of Theodor Adorno's work on the Princeton Radio Project, wherein Adorno sought to understand the ability of mass media to influence the public, which he saw as a danger to be mitigated, rather than a plan to be implemented.

Conspiracy theorists position themselves as defending "Western civilization", which serves as a floating signifier often focusing on capitalism and freedom of speech. The conspiracy theory is an extreme assessment of political correctness, accusing the latter of being a project to destroy Christianity, nationalism, and the nuclear family. Scholars associated with the Frankfurt School sought to create a better society by warning against patriarchy (Note: This has been disputed by some critics, who have suggested that the Frankfurt School's theory of historical development gives tacit support to patriarchy and imperialism.) and capitalist exploitation, goals that could seem threatening to others who have an interest in maintaining the status quo.

The conspiracy theory exaggerates the influence of the Frankfurt School; Stuart Jeffries, discussing it, noted their "negligible real-world impact". According to Joan Braune, Cultural Marxism in the sense referred to by the conspiracy theorists never existed, and does not correspond to any historical school of thought. She also states that Frankfurt School scholars are referred to as "Critical Theorists", not "Cultural Marxists". She points out that, contrary to the claims of the conspiracy theorists, postmodernism tends to be wary of or even hostile towards Marxism, including towards the grand narratives typically supported by Critical Theory.

== Antisemitism ==
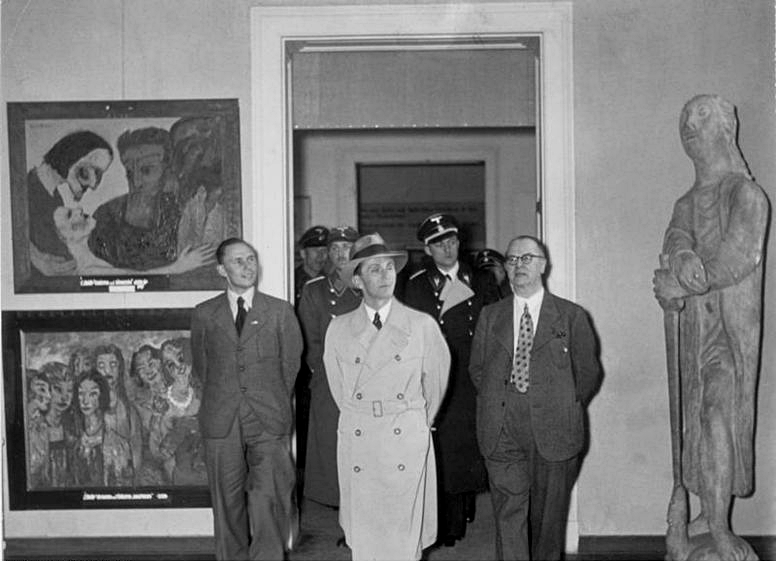
Joseph Goebbels views the Degenerate Art exhibition. The Cultural Marxism conspiracy theory is often compared to the antisemitic Nazi propaganda about "Cultural Bolshevism" and "degenerate art".

The author Matthew Rose wrote that arguments by the American neo-Nazi Francis Parker Yockey after World War II were an early example of the conspiracy theory.

William Lind on one occasion presented his theories at a Holocaust denial conference.

Spencer Sunshine, an associate fellow at the Political Research Associates, stated that "the focus on the Frankfurt School by the right serves to highlight its inherent Jewishness".

According to Samuel Moyn, "[t]he wider discourse around cultural Marxism today resembles nothing so much as a version of the Jewish Bolshevism myth updated for a new age." Maxime Dafaure likewise states that Cultural Marxism is a contemporary update of antisemitic conspiracy theories, such as the Nazi concept of "Cultural Bolshevism", and is directly associated with the concept of "Jewish Bolshevism". According to philosopher Slavoj Žižek, the term 'Cultural Marxism' "plays the same structural role as that of the 'Jewish plot' in anti-Semitism: it projects (or rather, transposes) the immanent antagonism of our socio-economic life onto an external cause: what the conservative alt-right deplores as the ethical disintegration of our lives (feminism, attacks on patriarchy, political correctness, etc.) must have an external cause—because it cannot, for them, emerge out of the antagonisms and tensions of our own societies." Dominic Green wrote a conservative critique of conservatives' complaints about Cultural Marxism in Spectator USA, stating: "For the Nazis, the Frankfurter School and its vaguely Jewish exponents fell under the rubric of Kulturbolschewismus, 'Cultural Bolshevism'."

Andrew Woods in the essay "Cultural Marxism and the Cathedral: Two Alt-Right Perspectives on Critical Theory" (2019), acknowledges comparisons to Cultural Bolshevism, but argues against the idea the modern conspiracy theory was derived from Nazi propaganda. He writes instead that its antisemitism is "profoundly American". In Commune magazine, Woods detailed a genealogy of the conspiracy theory beginning with the LaRouche movement.

Kevin MacDonald has written several anti-semitic texts centering on the Frankfurt School. MacDonald criticized Breivik's manifesto for not being more hostile to Jews.

=== Circulation in the alt-right ===
Neo-Nazi and white supremacists promoted the conspiracy theory and help expand its reach. Websites such as the American Renaissance have run articles with titles like "Cultural Marxism in Action: Media Matters Engineers Cancellation of Vdare.com Conference". The Daily Stormer regularly runs stories about "Cultural Marxism" with titles such as "Jewish Cultural Marxism is Destroying Abercrombie & Fitch", "Hollywood Strikes Again: Cultural Marxism through the Medium of Big Box-Office Movies" and "The Left-Center-Right Political Spectrum of Immigration = Cultural Marxism".

Neo-Nazis associated with the website Stormfront have strategically used the Frankfurt School as a euphemism to refer to Jewish people more generally, in venues where more forthright anti-semitism would be censored or rejected.

Timothy Matthews criticized the Frankfurt School from an explicitly Christian right perspective in the Catholic weekly newspaper The Wanderer. According to Matthews, the Frankfurt School, under the influence of Satan, seeks to destroy the traditional Christian family using critical theory and Marcuse's concept of polymorphous perversity, thereby encouraging homosexuality and breaking down the patriarchal family. Andrew Woods wrote that the plot Matthews describes does not resemble the Frankfurt School so much as the alleged aims of communists in The Naked Communist by W. Cleon Skousen. (Note: The article accused the Frankfurt School of having eleven primary aims: 1. The creation of racism offences; 2. Continual change to create confusion; 3. The teaching of sex and homosexuality to children; 4. The undermining of schools' and teachers' authority; 5. Huge immigration to destroy identity; 6. The promotion of excessive drinking; 7. Emptying of churches; 8. An unreliable legal system with bias against victims of crime; 9. Dependency on the state or state benefits; 10. Control and dumbing down of media; 11. Encouraging the breakdown of the family) Nonetheless, Matthews' account was circulated credulously by right-wing and alt-right news media, as well as in far-right internet forums, such as Stormfront.

Following the 2011 Norway attacks, the conspiracy theory was taken up by a number of far-right outlets and forums, including alt-right websites such as AltRight Corporation, InfoWars and VDARE which have promoted the theory. The AltRight Corporation's website, altright.com, featured articles with titles such as "Ghostbusters and the Suicide of Cultural Marxism", "#3 – Sweden: The World Capital of Cultural Marxism" and "Beta Leftists, Cultural Marxism and Self-Entitlement". InfoWars ran numerous headlines such as "Is Cultural Marxism America's New Mainline Ideology?" VDARE ran similar articles with similar titles such as "Yes, Virginia (Dare) There Is A Cultural Marxism—And It's Taking Over Conservatism Inc." Richard B. Spencer, head of the National Policy Institute, has promoted the conspiracy theory. Spencer's master's thesis was on the topic of Theodor Adorno.

A combination of homophobia and anti-globalism within the alt-right has produced the concept of "globohomo", a variant of "Cultural Marxism" alleging that media and business elites seek to impose a homogeneous "uniculture" on the world, and to weaken populations by promoting feminism, sexual freedom, gender fluidity, liberalism, and immigration. "Globohomo" stands in for global neoliberalism, which is believed to be responsible for replacing a diversity of local cultures (especially white, Western culture) with generic consumerism. The concept was promoted by pick-up artist James C. Weidmann through his blog Chateau Heartiste.

== Political violence ==
On July 22, 2011, Anders Breivik murdered 77 people in the 2011 Norway attacks. About 90 minutes before enacting the violence, Breivik e-mailed 1,003 people his manifesto 2083: A European Declaration of Independence and a copy of Political Correctness: A Short History of an Ideology. Cultural Marxism was the primary subject of Breivik's manifesto. Breivik wrote that the "sexually transmitted disease (STD) epidemic in Western Europe is a result of cultural Marxism", that "Cultural Marxism defines Muslims, feminist women, homosexuals, and some additional minority groups, as virtuous, and they view ethnic Christian European men as evil" and that the "European Court of Human Rights (ECHR) in Strasbourg is a cultural-Marxist-controlled political entity".

A number of other far-right terrorists have espoused the conspiracy theory. Jack Renshaw, a neo-Nazi child sex offender convicted of plotting the assassination of Labour MP Rosie Cooper, promoted the conspiracy theory in a video for the British National Party. John T. Earnest, the perpetrator of the 2019 Poway synagogue shooting, was inspired by white nationalist ideology. In an online manifesto, Earnest stated that he believed "every Jew is responsible for the meticulously planned genocide of the European race" through the promotion of "cultural Marxism and communism".

Concerning the real-life political violence caused by the conspiracy theory, law professor Samuel Moyn wrote: "That 'cultural Marxism' is a crude slander, referring to something that does not exist, unfortunately does not mean actual people are not being set up to pay the price, as scapegoats, to appease a rising sense of anger and anxiety. And for that reason, 'cultural Marxism' is not only a sad diversion from framing legitimate grievances but also a dangerous lure in an increasingly unhinged moment."

== Analysis ==
Sociologists Julia Lux and John David Jordan argue that the conspiracy theory can be broken down into its key elements: "misogynist anti-feminism, neo-eugenic science (broadly defined as various forms of genetic determinism), genetic and cultural white supremacy, McCarthyist anti-Leftism fixated on postmodernism, radical anti-intellectualism applied to the social sciences, and the idea that a purge is required to restore normality". They go on to say that all of these items are "supported, proselytised and academically buoyed by intellectuals, politicians, and media figures with extremely credible educational backgrounds".

In "Taking On Hate: One NGO's Strategies" (2009), the political scientist Heidi Beirich says the Cultural Marxism theory demonizes the cultural bêtes noires of conservatism such as feminists, LGBT social movements, secular humanists, multiculturalists, sex educators, environmentalists, immigrants and black nationalists.

Jamin writes on the flexibility of the conspiracy theory to serve the rhetorical purposes of different groups with diverse sets of enemies:

Next to the global dimension of the Cultural Marxism conspiracy theory, there is its innovative and original dimension, which lets its authors avoid racist discourses and pretend to be defenders of democracy. As such, Cultural Marxism is innovative in comparison with old styled theories of a similar nature, such as those involving Freemasons, Bavarian Illuminati, Jews or even Wall Street bankers. For Lind, Buchanan and Breivik, the threat does not come from the migrant or the Jew because he is a migrant or a Jew. For Lind, the threat comes from the Communist ideology, which is considered as a danger for freedom and democracy, and which is associated with different authoritarian political regimes (Russia, China, Cambodia, Cuba, etc.). For Buchanan, the threat comes from atheism, relativism and hard capitalism which, when combined, transform people and nations into an uncontrolled mass of alienated consumers. For Breivik, a self-indoctrinated lone-wolf, the danger comes from Islam, a religion seen as a totalitarian ideology which threatens liberal democracies from Western Europe as much as its Judeo-Christian heritage. In Lind, Buchanan and Breivik, overt racism is studiously avoided.

Literary scholar Aaron Hanlon wrote:

The objectives of proponents of conspiratorial views about Cultural Marxism were (and are) not to give a current account of Critical Theory, but to advance a conservative version of US liberalism against the scapegoat of global conspiracy theory ... In short, what Critical Theory provides to those who use 'critical theory' to signal a socialist threat to liberalism is not only a link to Marxist thought, but also a straw man against which to advance neoliberal politics.

On The Conversation, philosophy professor Matthew Sharpe noted:

The last four decades have seen a relative decline of Marxist thought in academia. Its influence has been superseded by 'post-structuralist' (or 'postmodernist') thinkers like Jacques Derrida, Michel Foucault, Judith Butler and Gilles Deleuze. Post-structuralism is primarily indebted to thinkers of the European 'conservative revolution' led by Nietzsche and Heidegger. Where Marxism is built on hopes for reason, revolution and social progress, post-structuralist thinkers roundly reject such optimistic 'grand narratives'. Post-structuralists are as preoccupied with culture as our conservative news columnists. But their analyses of identity and difference challenge the primacy Marxism affords to economics as much as they oppose liberal or conservative ideas.

== By country ==
=== Australia ===
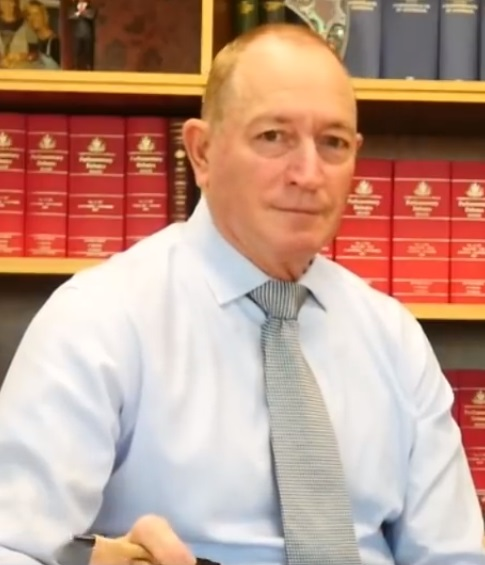
Fraser Anning

Shortly after the Norway attacks, mainstream right-wing politicians began espousing the conspiracy. In 2013, Cory Bernardi, a member of the ruling Liberal Party, wrote in his book The Conservative Revolution that "cultural Marxism has been one of the most corrosive influences on society over the last century".

Five years later, Fraser Anning, former Australian Senator, initially sitting as a member of Pauline Hanson's One Nation and then Katter's Australian Party, declared during his maiden speech in 2018 that "Cultural Marxism is not a throwaway line but a literal truth" and spoke of the need for a "final solution to the immigration problem".

=== Brazil ===
In Brazil, the government of Jair Bolsonaro contained a number of administration members who promoted the conspiracy theory, including Eduardo Bolsonaro, the president's son who "enthusiastically described Steve Bannon as an opponent of Cultural Marxism". Jair Bolsonaro sought to expunge the influence of Paulo Freire from Brazilian universities. This had the opposite effect, driving sales of Freire's book Pedagogy of the Oppressed.

=== Cuba ===
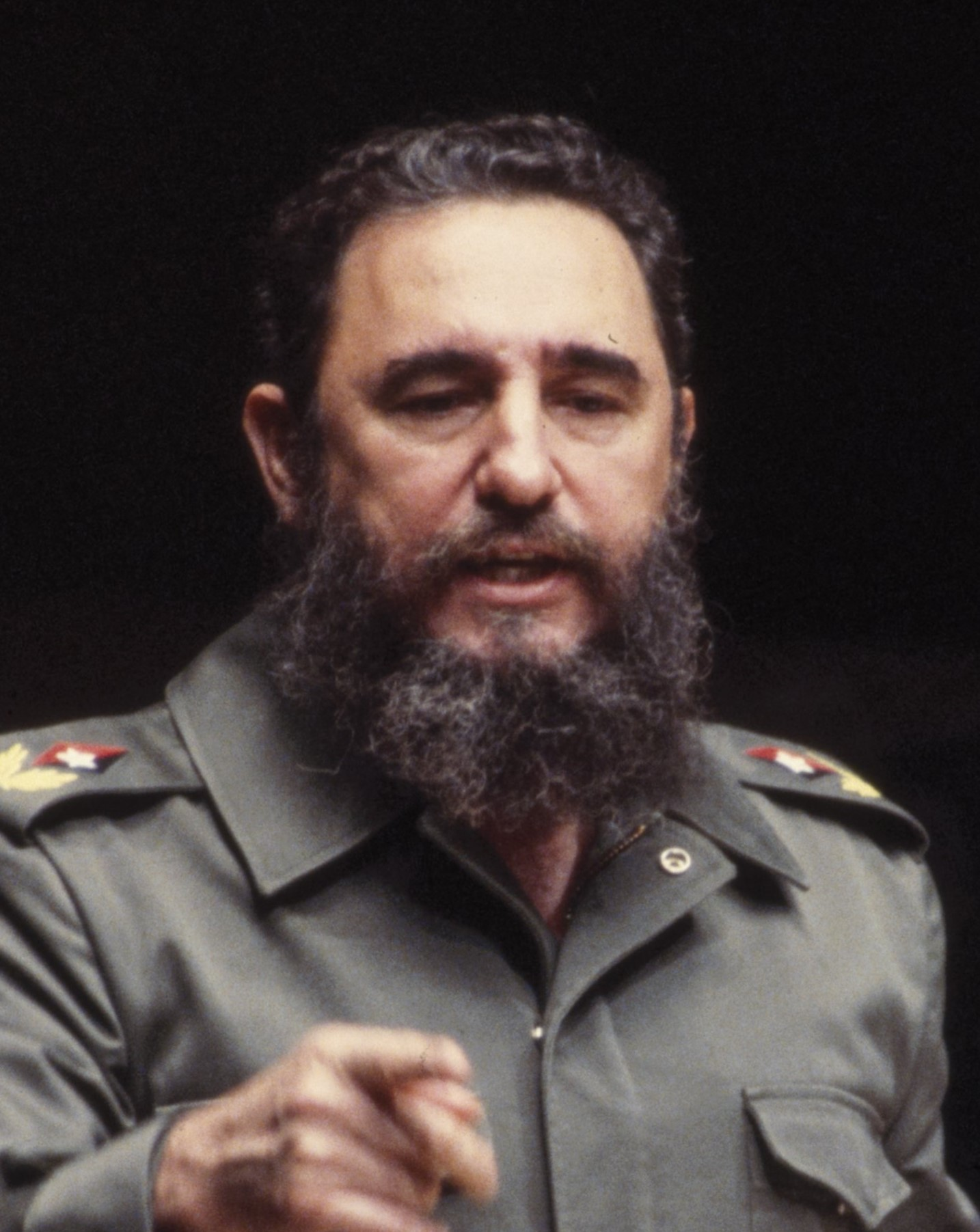
Fidel Castro

In 2010, former head of state Fidel Castro called attention to a version of the conspiracy theory by Daniel Estulin, which proposed that the Bilderberg Group sought to influence world events via the spread of rock and roll music. Estulin's work was based on Minnicino's 1992 essay which emphasized Adorno's involvement in the Radio Research Project. Martin Jay described Estulin's text as "risible" and explained that, although some in the Frankfurt School wrote about the potential for mass media to pacify labor movements, it was something they lamented rather than planned to implement. Castro invited Estulin to Cuba, where they issued a joint statement claiming Osama bin Laden was a CIA asset and that the United States was planning a nuclear war against Russia. In 2019, Jay wrote that Castro's interest in the conspiracy theory had no long-term consequences.

=== Hungary ===
Former Hungarian prime minister Viktor Orbán invoked a cultural Marxism frame in justifying certain illiberal policies and authoritarian centralization of power. Orbán, who wrote a master's thesis on Antonio Gramsci, references Gramscian cultural hegemony as an impetus to contest left-aligned epistemic institutions, including universities and the media. In alignment with the cultural Marxism frame, Hungarian minister Bence Rétvári said that gender studies should be regarded as ideology rather than science. The Hungarian government withdrew state recognition of gender studies degree programs in 2018.

=== United Kingdom ===
During the Brexit debate in 2019, a number of Conservatives and Brexiteers were criticized for using the phrase "cultural Marxism" due to its conspiracy theory connotations.

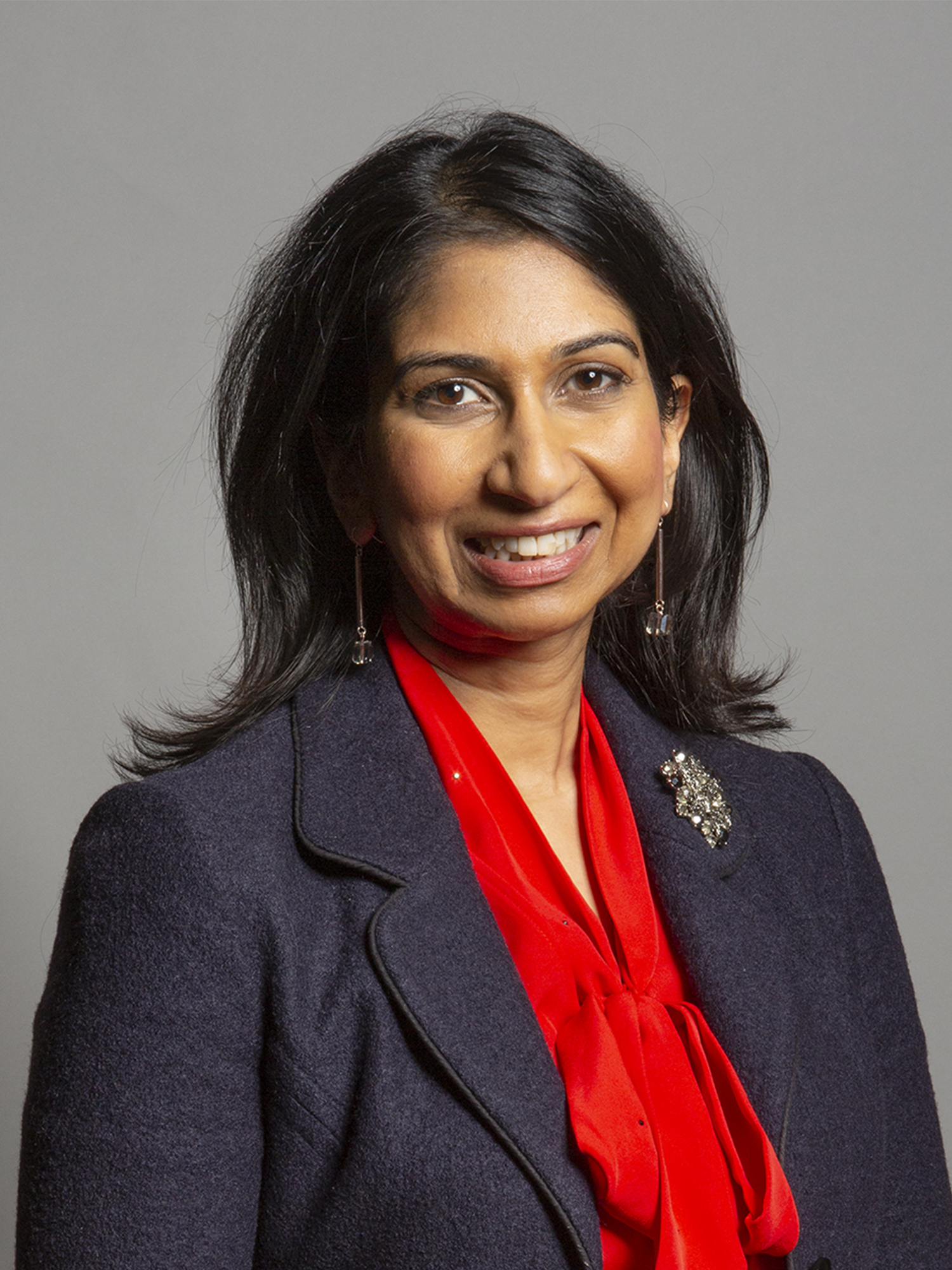
Suella Braverman, a British Member of Parliament, ignited controversy by using the term "Cultural Marxism".

Suella Braverman, a Conservative Member of Parliament (MP), said in a pro-Brexit speech for the Bruges Group, a Eurosceptic think tank, that "[w]e are engaging in many battles right now. As Conservatives, we are engaged in a battle against cultural Marxism, where banning things is becoming de rigueur, where freedom of speech is becoming a taboo, where our universities – quintessential institutions of liberalism – are being shrouded in censorship and a culture of no-platforming." Her usage of the conspiracy theory was condemned as hate speech by other MPs, the Board of Deputies of British Jews and the anti-racist organization Hope Not Hate. After meeting with her later, the Board of Deputies of British Jews said that she is "not in any way antisemitic". Braverman was alerted to this connection by journalist Dawn Foster, but she defended using the term. Braverman denied that the term "Cultural Marxism' is an antisemitic trope, stating during a question and answer session "whether she stood by the term, given its far-right connections. She said: 'Yes, I do believe we are in a battle against cultural Marxism, as I said. We have culture evolving from the far left which has allowed the snuffing out of freedom of speech, freedom of thought.'" Braverman further added that she was "very aware of that ongoing creep of cultural Marxism, which has come from Jeremy Corbyn".

Nigel Farage has promoted the cultural Marxist conspiracy theory, for which he has been condemned by Jewish groups, such as the Board of Deputies of British Jews, as well as a number of Members of Parliament, who said he used it as a dog-whistle code for antisemitism. Farage said that the United Kingdom faced "cultural Marxism", a term described in its report by The Guardian as "originating in a conspiracy theory based on a supposed plot against national governments, which is closely linked to the far right and antisemitism". Farage's spokesman "condemned previous criticism of his language by Jewish groups and others as 'pathetic' and 'a manufactured story'".

In The War Against the BBC (2020), Patrick Barwise and Peter York write how the Cultural Marxism conspiracy theory has been pushed by some on the right as part of an alleged bias of the BBC. Yasmin Alibhai-Brown cites Dominic Cummings, Tim Montgomerie and the right-wing website Guido Fawkes as examples of "relentlessly [complaining] about the institution's 'cultural Marxism' or left-wing bias. This now happens on a near-daily basis".

In November 2020, a letter signed by 28 Conservative MPs, published in The Telegraph, accused the National Trust of being "coloured by cultural Marxist dogma, colloquially known as the 'woke agenda'". The use of this terminology in the letter was described by the All-Party Parliamentary Group Against Antisemitism, Jewish Council for Racial Equality, anti-racist charity Hope Not Hate and the Campaign Against Antisemitism as antisemitic.

=== United States ===
Cultural Marxism discourse was found in several strands of U.S. right-wing politics from 2000, including the religious right and the Tea Party movement.

Shortly after the election of Donald Trump in 2016, Alex Ross wrote an article in The New Yorker titled "The Frankfurt School Knew Trump was Coming". It argued that Trump represented the kind of authoritarian identified by Theodor Adorno's F-scale. This idea prompted academic conferences on the same theme at the New School for Social Research and the Leo Baeck Institute. Martin Jay linked election rhetoric of Trump supporters as "deplorables" to Adorno's authoritarian personality concept, saying it "counterproductively forecloses treating those it categorized as anything but objects of contempt". Jay encouraged empathy and dialogue to resolve political polarization.

In 2017, it was reported that advisor Rich Higgins was fired from the United States National Security Council for publishing the memorandum "POTUS & Political Warfare" that alleged the existence of a left-wing conspiracy to destroy Donald Trump's presidency because "American public intellectuals of Cultural Marxism, foreign Islamicists, and globalist bankers, the news media, and politicians from the Republican and Democratic parties were attacking Trump, because he represents an existential threat to the cultural Marxist memes that dominate the prevailing cultural narrative in the US." Higgins also asserted that the Frankfurt School "sought to deconstruct everything in order to destroy it, giving rise to society-wide nihilism". The memo was read by Donald Trump Jr. who passed on a copy of it to his father.

Matt Shea, a Republican former member of the Washington House of Representatives has also promoted Higgins' memo.

In June 2023, Ron DeSantis, governor of Florida and candidate for President in the 2024 election, defined "woke" as a "form of Cultural Marxism". Texas U.S. senator Ted Cruz used both terms in the title of his 2023 book, Unwoke: How to Defeat Cultural Marxism in America.

=== South Korea ===
In September 2024, National Human Rights Commission of Korea chairperson Ahn Chang-ho stated, "Many cultural Marxists declared 'Our fundamental enemy is Christianity' and promoted homosexuality as a means of bringing about a communist revolution." During his nomination hearing he stated, "I have heard that there are some neo-Marxists who suggest that homosexuality is a key means in a communist revolution", and if an anti-discrimination law is enacted it would create a situation where "Marxists and fascists operate with impunity in society".

=== Japan ===
Following their rise to prominence in the 2025 upper house election, the far-right party Sanseitō submitted a written question to the cabinet titled "A written question regarding the infiltration of Communism and Cultural Marxism in the nation and its effects on the state". The question described Cultural Marxism as having roots in the Frankfurt School and Antonio Gramsci, and asserted that it required special attention due to its unconventional nature in infiltrating the society and transforming the institution from inside, as opposed to the conventional Marxist revolutionary ideology. The cabinet declined to give answers stating that it was unclear as to what was meant by the languages in the question.

== Online harassment ==
Gamergate was an online harassment campaign beginning in 2014, particularly targeting women, that had the purported aim of promoting ethics in video games journalism. Participants in Gamergate referred to their opposition as cultural Marxists, and cited free-speech grounds to justify harassing their targets. Noted harassment associated with the online movement included doxing, swatting, and threats of rape and death. The Southern Poverty Law Center described the Gamergate campaign as one in a number of examples of male supremacy, which it said views society as "a matriarchy propped up by 'cultural Marxism' meant to eradicate or subjugate men".

== See also ==
- Blood libel
- Doctors' plot
- Great Replacement conspiracy theory
- Judeo-Masonic conspiracy theory
- Pizzagate conspiracy theory
- QAnon
- White genocide conspiracy theory
- Zionist Occupation Government conspiracy theory
