= National Empowerment Television =

Former American conservative cable TV network

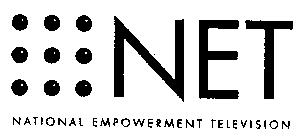
Logo

National Empowerment Television (NET), later known as America's Voice and eventually The Renaissance Network, was a cable TV network designed to rapidly mobilize politically conservative individuals for grassroots lobbying on behalf of the movement's policy aims. It was created by Paul Weyrich, a veteran strategist for the paleoconservative movement. At its peak, NET claimed to reach more than 11 million homes on selected cable systems or, in some markets, low-powered television stations. It accompanied the contemporaneous explosion of the popularity of talk radio, practically all of which was dedicated to propagating conservative political positions, on numerous issues in the United States during the 1990s. It was founded in 1993 and ceased business operations in 2000.

== History ==
Weyrich had long believed that the mainstream news and entertainment media exhibited a liberal bias, opposed structurally, as well as in terms of content, to what figures in the conservative movement defined as traditional American culture and government. In an attempt to help counter the perceived phenomenon, he mobilized groups and donors who were equally concerned by the supposed lack of journalistic integrity, and who were disgusted by the complete dismissals of these concerns by established broadcasters and publishers. Coordinated by Weyrich's Free Congress Foundation (FCF), the activists and donors launched a Washington, D.C.–based satellite television network called National Empowerment Television (NET). Its logo featured a square of nine dots, referring to a puzzle that cannot be solved without drawing lines "outside the box." NET went on air for the first time on 6 December 1993.

Academics and representatives of the mainstream media roundly criticized NET, namely because of its drastic departure from the mainstream 20th-century paradigm of disinterested reportage, in favor of what they viewed as blatant propaganda. For instance, the Columbia Journalism Review observed in 1994 that it spurned "broadcast journalism's caveat against partisan news programming... One-third of the programs on NET are produced by 'associate broadcasters' — organizations handpicked by Weyrich to share NET's airtime. Among the dozen associate broadcasters on NET are Accuracy in Media, the National Rifle Association of America, and the American Life League, an anti-abortion group.

The CJR analysis referred to FCF's attempt to circumvent mainstream media opposition by using associate broadcasters (i.e., organizations not legally related to FCF), local broadcasting channels for television syndication, and other non-traditional means of marketing. Thus, NET became a broader resource for United States' social and economic conservative movements. Many advertisers from organizations that had been traditionally shunned by major broadcasters bought airtime on the channel. These included televangelists on local religious stations and networks like Christian Coalition, the Cato Institute, Accuracy in Media, and others.

Nevertheless, the network was interested in a broad base of issues, including topics not typically associated with American conservatism. For instance, under the management of Weyrich, NET was involved in discussing – on programs entitled American on Track and The New Electric Railway Journal (affiliated with a print magazine of the same name) – public and mass transit issues, including local rail and interstate mass transit, and the deleterious effects of automotive-oriented planning on the American environment, economy, and urban quality of life. There were also programs and segments on family, community, and social issues, that featured writers, local community activists and representatives, and academic leaders. Other programs focused on issues important to FCF activity: Endangered Liberties discussed privacy issues; Legal Notebook emphasized judicial nominations and court trends, and Next Revolution covered activities within social conservatism. The most popular program was Direct Line with Weyrich, in which the host interviewed lawmakers and other prominent figures live, and permitted the public to call in directly with questions and comments, with Weyrich delivering commentary in the final segment. Additionally, the channel had programming on culinary and etiquette issues, and even occasional segments devoted to wines and music.

In all of its programming, the management team under Weyrich sought a highly professionalized approach to both its advocacy, and journalistic programming. Consequently, the channel featured high production values, and cost a great deal. The FCF claimed that various ideologically liberal organizations, individuals, and industry competitors pressured many advertising firms to withdraw or withhold support. The result was that revenue could not meet operating costs, and in response to donor and investor pressure for a clearer focus, FCF dropped all programs not directly related to public policy and conservative activism and rebranded the channel as NET: The Conservative NewsTalk Network, with the initials NET, no longer standing for anything, and the nine-dot logo replaced with one evoking the U.S. Capitol dome. It also began news reports and updates (akin to the likes of CNN, albeit keeping its ideological principles at the forefront), and a full-fledged investigative journalism program. However, the high cost of this strategy, perceived obstacles to entering the marketplace, and other factors combined to bring NET down by 1997.

As part of its audience mobilization strategy, NET invited viewers to participate in eight hours of live call-in television each day. Programs included:

- The Progress Report, hosted by then-House Minority Whip Newt Gingrich and Heather Higgins
- Capitol Watch, hosted by Burton Pines and Council Nedd II
- Direct Line, with Weyrich
- Borderline, a forum for discussion of restrictionist views on immigration policy
- The Cato Forum, provided the Cato Institute, an established libertarian think tank, with an ongoing opportunity to promote its beliefs concerning the illegitimacy of taxes and government regulation
- Legal Notebook, provided discussion and perspectives by legal analysts on crime in America
- Straight Talk, produced in conjunction with the Family Research Council
- On Target, produced in conjunction with the National Rifle Association
- Science Under Siege, co-produced with the Competitive Enterprise Institute

=== NET and Philip Morris ===
Some detractors of NET cite its support from Philip Morris. In a 1993 internal strategy paper, the company discussed options for increasing NET's adverse coverage of Bill Clinton's proposal to finance an expanded public healthcare system with increased taxes on tobacco. "Generate additional publicity by having NET dedicate a news crew and programming to the health care issue as well as other challenges to the industry. Regarding health care, the crew could cover the town hall meeting sponsored by Citizens for a Sound Economy (CSE) and broadcast the highlights nationally", the memo suggested.

"With respect to other issues, NET could produce their [sic] own version of a 60 Minutes show demonstrating the industry's side of controversial issues such as FDA/nicotine, and the EPA's risk assessment on ETS. Finally, NET could sponsor public opinion surveys in key congressional districts on the health care issue and broadcast the results," the memo stated.

While the company was hoping to get NET to assist in advancing its corporate agenda, Morris was willing to return the favor to NET. "Philip Morris could increase the impact of NET's coverage by assisting the network in getting additional cable companies to carry their broadcasts", the memo stated.

Funding was also an option; "Since NET is a TV network, we could fund these activities via product advertisements from the food and beer business", the memo suggested.

Despite the potential for controversy, the company's funding of NET was extremely minor. A March 1994 internal strategy document revealed that it spent only $200,000 to help fund NET. One proposed miniseries would 'focus on debunking the myths of the Clinton plan and the use of excises to fund such a plan, and to investigate more market-driven alternatives". Morris planned another miniseries critiquing the proposed Clinton health care plan, as a part of a broad-based effort by health care providers and businesses of all types to stop the nationalization of American health care.

== Donor intervention and controversy ==
NET was also a broader resource for U.S. social and economic conservatism. Many organizations bought the rights to air programs on the channel. This was part of NET's strategy of flouting the conventional media of the time. However, the strategy had flaws, as each associate added more oversight on NET's finances and programming segmentation, thereby inadvertently diluting the focus of NET. For instance, Philip Morris was hopeful NET could prove to be a powerful campaign tool. "If the health care miniseries goes well, the possibilities of working with NET to present our side of the story are virtually limitless (VNR's, district by district canvassing, etc.) … but will require a substantial amount of increased support", the internal report noted. Although Morris decided against such a strategy, the report delineated the potential hazards of relying mostly on outside organizations for programming.

Nevertheless, Weyrich and others remained steadfast in their programming orientation and optimism. In a proposal sent to potential sponsors, NET boasted that in its first nine months, the network had "confirmed the validity of its motivating premise: that public affairs broadcasting based upon solid American principles and values has appeal beyond the hearty but thin ranks of policy wonks by making discussion of public affairs exciting and compelling, by igniting viewers' passions, by bringing elected officials onto live programs to be grilled by caller [sic] around the country, and by hosting programs not with TV personalities but with veteran Washington hands familiar with how the nation's capital works." According to the proposal which states, "increasing conflict: Champions and opponents of measures increasingly face each other on the shows," one of the changes NET had made to its programs was to begin inviting opposing viewpoints to increase viewer interest. This was in keeping with the popularity of mainstream political programs such as CNN's Crossfire and PBS' The McLaughlin Group, both of which featured debate-style arguing, as well as a close ally of Weyrich in paleoconservative circles, Pat Buchanan.

Another supporter was the then-Speaker of the House of Representatives, Newt Gingrich, who hosted his own weekly program, Progress Report with Newt Gingrich. The program was paid for by Gingrich's Progress and Freedom Foundation and was reported to cost $140,000. Gingrich also helped out by hosting a February 1995 $50,000 plate fundraising dinner to build up NET's coffers.

In the ensuing controversy over Gingrich's role as a fundraiser for a conservative media organization, Weyrich rebuffed criticisms, defending his sponsor. "The fact is that but for the efforts of people like the speaker, NET would not continue", Weyrich wrote in a column in The Washington Times, itself another media vehicle for conservative ideology in the U.S.

According to NET's proposal, its first-year budget was $5.6 million, with $1 million to be raised from eight 'associate producers', with advertising scheduled to bring in only $365,000, and on-air fundraising another $262,000. NET hoped any shortfall would be eliminated by grants and pledges from unspecified sources.

In 1995, Weyrich wrote to its associate broadcasters, to inform them that from April 1, National Empowerment Television "will now be referred to as NET-Political NewsTalk Network".

"It seems that the name National Empowerment Television often led to some misconceptions about what we do. As we actively pursue new affiliates, we now hope to be more readily identifiable as a public policy organization", he explained. In practice, however, the "PNTN" sub-branding was very rarely used, and "NET" continued to be used on air, and by providers carrying the network to identify it.

== High costs bring changes ==
Although NET was launched with a budget of $10 million, it bled money. In 1995 alone, Weyrich transferred $2 million in assets to the project. Despite the initial support of its original associate broadcasters, it was only enough to cover the operating costs continuingly. Further, the apprehension of most big business corporations against sponsoring programs left the network isolated. When it failed to get continuing financial support, FCF split off NET as a private business and sought private funds.

FCF planned a new strategy to make NET a self-sustaining, even profitable, commercial enterprise, rather than a money-losing tool of outreach. However, the FCF blamed the hostility of other large media and agitation by liberal groups for the refusal of support from major advertising firms. Without enough revenue to cover its costs, the corporate board forced Weyrich to stop new segment programming and focus on retooling the network for a relaunch.

In a decision he later came to regret bitterly, Weyrich, under pressure from the associate broadcasters, turned over the day-to-day operation of the channel to Robert Sutton, an industry veteran who had been successful with other startups. It relaunched in the spring of 1997 as a for-profit TV channel called "America's Voice", with another $20 million in seed money. However, Sutton came from the ranks of mainstream media and refused to agree with Weyrich and others' ideological analysis that the television industry was failing to meet the demands of conservative and traditionalist viewers. A power struggle ensued, with Sutton persuading the network's board to force out Weyrich in a hostile takeover.

With Weyrich gone, under Sutton, the channel abandoned its conservative identity, marketing itself merely as a non-ideological forum for the public to make its views known to policymakers, akin to the call-in programs on C-SPAN. However, the network retained four conservative programs funded by the FCF and a few remaining supporters, but it had to pay to retain them. Finally, further pressure from advertisers and larger broadcasters allegedly forced even those to be removed.

With much of its original viewership alienated, and also with the rise of Fox News Channel as a popular and far-better-funded source of conservative opinion on cable television, financial support under Sutton collapsed, and Dish Network dropped it. Eventually, America's Voice was sold, becoming "The Renaissance Network" (TRN), airing on a few broadcast stations, mainly UHF and low-power channels. Facing ruin, TRN brought back FCF content, but it was not enough to save the operation.

== Legacy ==
Even without the financial and administrative issues that led to its demise, the future viability of NET would likely have been poor in any case, due to its orientation toward then-minority elements within conservatism such as right-wing populism, hard-core libertarianism, isolationist foreign policy, protectionist economics, and borderline anti-Semitism and racism. Instead, Fox News focused on then-mainstream issues, reflecting fusionist general ideology, neoliberal economics (not referring to political liberalism per se), and neoconservative foreign policy, a consensus that marked the Republican Party's governing philosophy at that time. In sharp contrast to the failed NET/America's Voice/TRN, Fox News went on to eventually become the highest-rated cable network devoted to public affairs.

Ironically, in response to the accession of Donald Trump to the U.S. presidency in 2017, and his celebrity among Republican voters, as well as intellectual and institutional leaders of the American political Right, Fox News began to incorporate paleoconservative, and even alt-right, perspectives. This eventually became the network's primary vantage point by the late 2010s, in both its reporting and talk programming, perhaps vindicating, posthumously, Weyrich's original vision for NET.
