= Shirley DeLibero =

Shirley DeLibero was chairman and CEO of the Metropolitan Transit Authority of Harris County, Texas from 1999 until 2004.

DeLibero was previously the deputy executive of Dallas Area Rapid Transit, and executive director of New Jersey Transit.

Her tenure at Texas was marked by the introduction of the METRORail light rail transit system and for scandals; In 2000, she was suspended for 30 days after failing to report a collision involving her company car. It was also revealed that DeLibero had falsified two claimed college degrees on her resume.
