= Paul Weyrich =

American conservative political activist (1942–2008)

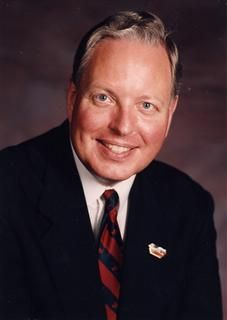

Personal details
- Born: Paul Michael Weyrich; October 7, 1942 Racine, Wisconsin, U.S.
- Died: December 18, 2008 (aged 66) Fairfax, Virginia, U.S.
- Resting place: Fairfax Memorial Park
- Party: Republican
- Spouse: Joyce Smigun
- Children: 5
- Education: University of Wisconsin, Parkside

Paul Michael Weyrich (/ˈwaɪrɪk/; October 7, 1942 – December 18, 2008) was an American conservative political activist and commentator associated with the New Right. He co-founded The Heritage Foundation, the Free Congress Foundation, National Empowerment Television, and the American Legislative Exchange Council, and coined the term "moral majority," co-founding an organization of the same name in 1979 with Jerry Falwell. He has been described as one of the founders of the 21st century Christian right. He was also a Melkite Catholic deacon.

== Early life and education ==
Paul Michael Weyrich was born in Racine, Wisconsin, to Virginia M. (née Wickstrom) and Ignatius A. Weyrich. His father was a German immigrant. Weyrich graduated from St. Catherine's High School in 1960 and attended the University of Wisconsin–Racine for two years.

== Career ==
=== Journalism ===
He was active in the Racine County Young Republicans from 1961 to 1963 and in Barry Goldwater's 1964 presidential campaign. He spent his early career in journalism as a political reporter for the Milwaukee Sentinel, as a political reporter and weekend anchor for WISN-TV in Milwaukee, in radio as a reporter for WAXO-FM in Kenosha, Wisconsin, WLIP-AM, and as news director of KQXI in Denver.

=== Ordination ===
After the Second Vatican Council, Weyrich transferred from the Latin Church of the Catholic Church to the Melkite Greek Catholic Church and was ordained as a deacon for the Melkite Greek Catholic Eparchy of Newton.

=== Political activism ===
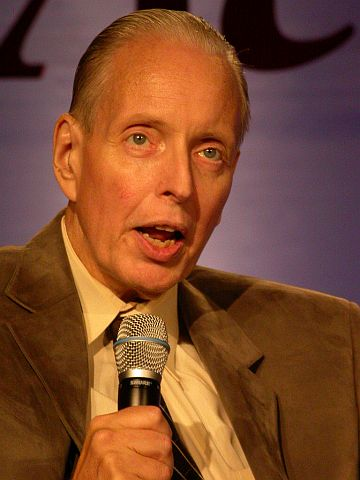
Weyrich in 2007

Weyrich foresaw a potential to organize conservative Christians into a voting bloc in the early 1960s, and reportedly started trying to do so during the 1964 presidential election campaign. Throughout the 1960s, he tried several wedge issues, including abortion, pornography, the proposed Equal Rights Amendment, and school prayer, without success. In 1966, Weyrich became press secretary to Republican U.S. Senator Gordon L. Allott of Colorado. While serving in this capacity, he met Jack Wilson, an aide of Joseph Coors, patriarch of the Coors brewing family. Frustrated with the state of public policy research, they founded Analysis and Research Inc. in 1971, but the organization failed to gain traction.

In 1973, persuading Joseph Coors to support it financially, Weyrich and Edwin Feulner co-founded The Heritage Foundation as a think tank to counter liberal views on taxation and regulation, which they considered to be anti-business. While the organization was at first only minimally influential, it grew into one of the world's largest public policy research institutes and has been hugely influential in advancing conservative policies. The following year, in 1976, again with support from Coors, Weyrich founded the Committee for the Survival of a Free Congress (CSFC). CSFC "became active in eastern European politics after the Cold War. Figuring prominently in this effort was Weyrich's right-hand man, Laszlo Pasztor, a former leader of the pro-Nazi Arrow Cross Party in Hungary, which had collaborated with Hitler's Third Reich. After serving two years in prison for his Arrow Cross activities, Pasztor found his way to the United States, where he was instrumental in establishing the ethnic-outreach arm of the Republican national Committee," author Martin Lee wrote in 1997. Under Weyrich, the CSFC proved highly innovative. It was among the first grassroots organizations to raise funds extensively through direct mail campaigns. It also was one of the first organizations to tap into evangelical Christian churches as places to recruit and cultivate activists and support for social conservative causes. Over the next two decades, Weyrich founded, co-founded, or held prominent roles in a number of other notable conservative organizations, including founding the American Legislative Exchange Council, an organization of state legislators, co-founding the Council for National Policy, a strategy-formulating organization for social conservatives, co-publishing Conservative Digest, a conservative magazine, and serving as national chairman of Coalitions for America, an association of conservative activist organizations. He also later reorganized CSFC into the Free Congress Foundation (FCF).

In the early 1970s, Weyrich was first able to politically mobilize conservative Protestants after federal courts ruled segregation academies ineligible for tax exemption, and the Internal Revenue Service began revoking tax exemptions of these schools. Most of these private schools were church sponsored and had been founded to serve white students who abandoned public schools after they were integrated. At this time, conservative Protestants were not an organized voting bloc, and many of them supported both major political parties. These court cases and actions by the IRS reportedly caught the ire of several evangelical leaders, including Jerry Falwell. Weyrich sought to frame the IRS crackdown on segregation academics as an issue of government intrusion and attacks on religious freedom, effectively diverting attention from the racial aspect of the issue. The largest institution targeted was fundamentalist Christian college Bob Jones University, which lost its tax exemption in 1976 due to a policy prohibiting interracial dating. This action further enraged evangelical leaders, many of whom believed that the IRS was overstepping its legal authority.

In 1977, Weyrich co-founded Christian Voice with Robert Grant. The following year, the IRS proposed a new rule that would have revoked the tax exemption of private schools based on their racial demographic composition relative to that of their respective communities. Weyrich later cited this as the beginnings of the religious right, but realized that another wedge issue would be required to keep evangelical Christians mobilized. The unexpected success of predominantly Catholic anti-abortion activists in the 1978 midterms convinced Weyrich that opposition to abortion might work as a wedge issue to keep evangelicals politically mobilized. He favored the issue because it could be framed in the context of family values and be used to claim moral superiority, as well as attack second-wave feminism. Prior to this time, the Catholic Church was the only Christian denomination that was staunchly anti-abortion, with many Protestant and evangelical denominations, including the Southern Baptist Convention, either supporting legalization of the procedure, or not taking a stance on the issue. Many evangelical leaders were hesitant to embrace opposition to abortion as a wedge issue, believing that its stereotype amongst evangelicals as a "Catholic issue" would hinder its ability to politically mobilize them, but conservative Christians began joining the anti-abortion movement in large numbers by the early 1980s. In 1979, Weyrich co-founded the Moral Majority with Jerry Falwell. The organization was credited with mobilizing evangelical Protestants to support Ronald Reagan, and electing him to the presidency in 1980.

In 1997, under the auspices of the Free Congress Foundation, Weyrich founded the Washington, D.C.–based satellite television station National Empowerment Television (NET), later relaunched as the for-profit channel "America's Voice" in 1997. That same year, Weyrich was forced out of the network he had founded when the network's head persuaded its board to force out Weyrich in a hostile takeover. Chip Berlet of Political Research Associates said this was, "apparently for his divisive behavior in attacking GOP pragmatists". From 1989 to 1996, he was also president of the Krieble Institute, a unit of the FCF that trained activists to support democracy movements and establish small businesses in Eastern Europe and the former Soviet Union.

By 1997, The Heritage Foundation and the Free Congress Foundation were two of the top five biggest and best funded conservative think tanks.

In his 2009 book "The Next Conservatism" which he co-wrote with William Lind, Weyrich argued that conservatives "should be fighting to return to family structures of the 1950s" which is a goal that has been picked up by leaders after him.

=== Rail transit activism ===
In contrast with many conservatives, Weyrich had a long history of ardent support for rail mass transit. He opposed "bus rapid transit" (a particular type of bus transit with higher capacity but also higher costs than ordinary bus transit), and instead supported rail transit as a more effective alternative. In 1988, he co-founded a quarterly magazine on the subject of urban rail transit, called The New Electric Railway Journal, which, until 1996, was published by FCF, and he was its publisher.

He wrote an opinion column for most issues and contributed a few feature articles. FCF discontinued its affiliation with TNERJ in 1996, but the magazine continued being produced, under a different publishing company, until the end of 1998, with Weyrich listed as "Publisher Emeritus". In early 2000, about a year after the last magazine was published, Weyrich and William S. Lind (who had been the magazine's associate publisher until 1996) launched a website where they could continue to post their views and news about rail transit. They called the webpage "The New New Electric Railway Journal", and Weyrich wrote numerous op-ed columns in favor of proposed light rail and metro systems. He also supported bringing back streetcars to U.S. cities.

Weyrich also served on the national board of Amtrak from 1987 to 1993 the Amtrak Reform Council, and on local and regional rail transit advocacy organizations.

== Views ==
As a key figure of the New Right—Harper's Magazine noted that he was "often described by his admirers as 'the Lenin of social conservatism'"—Weyrich positioned himself as a defender of traditionalist sociopolitical values, states' rights, marriage, anti-communism, and as a staunch opponent of the New Left.

In Thy Kingdom Come, Randall Balmer recounts comments that Weyrich, whom he describes as "one of the architects of the Religious Right in the late 1970s", made at a conference sponsored by a religious right organization that they both attended in Washington in 1990:

In the course of one of the sessions, Weyrich tried to make a point to his Religious Right brethren (no women attended the conference, as I recall). Let's remember, he said animatedly, that the Religious Right did not come together in response to the Roe decision. No, Weyrich insisted, what got us going as a political movement was the attempt on the part of the Internal Revenue Service (IRS) to rescind the tax-exempt status of Bob Jones University because of its racially discriminatory policies.

Bob Jones University had policies that refused black students enrollment until 1971, admitted only married blacks from 1971 to 1975, and prohibited interracial dating and marriage between 1975 and 2000.

Weyrich was a supporter of voter suppression, saying in 1980: "I don't want everybody to vote. Elections are not won by a majority of people. They never have been from the beginning of our country, and they are not now. As a matter of fact, our leverage in the elections quite candidly goes up as the voting populace goes down."

In October 1997, The New Republic published an article "Robespierre of the Right—What I Ate at the Revolution" by David Grann, which portrayed Weyrich as highly effective at creating a conservative establishment but also a volatile and tempestuous figure. Weyrich, supported by Larry Klayman of Judicial Watch, sued the magazine and others for libel; the case was dismissed, then remanded in January 2001, then dropped by Weyrich.

Weyrich abhorred Political Correctness which he called Cultural Marxism, seeing it as a deliberate effort to undermine what he believed was "our traditional, Western, Judeo-Christian culture" and the conservative agenda in American society. In 1999, writing that he believed "we have lost the culture war", he suggested "a legitimate strategy for us to follow is to look at ways to separate ourselves from the institutions that have been captured by the ideology of Political Correctness, or by other enemies of our traditional culture.... we need to drop out of this [alien and hostile] culture, and find places, even if it is where we physically are right now, where we can live godly, righteous and sober lives."

In response to a 1999 controversy covered by the press concerning a group of Wiccans in the United States military who were holding religious rituals and services on the grounds of the bases they were assigned to, Weyrich sought to exempt Wiccans from the Free Exercise Clause of the First Amendment and bar them from serving in the military altogether. Weyrich, as president of the Free Congress Foundation, led a coalition of ten religious right organizations that attempted a Christian boycott on joining the military until all Wiccans were removed from the services, saying:

Until the Army withdraws all official support and approval from witchcraft, no Christian should enlist or re-enlist in the Army, and Christian parents should not allow their children to join the Army. ...An Army that sponsors satanic rituals is unworthy of representing the United States of America. ...The official approval of satanism and witchcraft by the Army is a direct assault on the Christian faith that generations of American soldiers have fought and died for. ...If the Army wants witches and satanists in its ranks, then it can do it without Christians in those ranks. It's time for the Christians in this country to put a stop to this kind of nonsense. A Christian recruiting strike will compel the Army to think seriously about what it is doing.

=== Dominionism ===
According to TheocracyWatch and the Anti-Defamation League, both Weyrich and his Free Congress Foundation were closely associated with dominionism. TheocracyWatch listed both as leading examples of "dominionism in action," citing "a manifesto from Paul Weyrich's Free Congress Foundation," The Integration of Theory and Practice: A Program for the New Traditionalist Movement which "illuminates the tactics of the dominionist movement". TheocracyWatch which calls it "Paul Weyrich's Training Manual", and others, consider this manifesto a virtual playbook for how the "theocratic right" in American politics can get and keep power. The Anti-Defamation League identified Weyrich and the Free Congress Foundation as part of an alliance of more than 50 of the most prominent conservative Christian leaders and organizations that threaten the separation of church and state.

Weyrich continued to reject allegations that he advocated theocracy, saying, "[T]his statement is breathtaking in its bigotry", and dismissed the claim that the Christian right wished to transform America into a theocracy. Katherine Yurica wrote that Weyrich guided Eric Heubeck in writing The Integration of Theory and Practice, the Free Congress Foundation's strategic plan published in 2001 by the FCF, which she says calls for the use of deception, misinformation, and divisiveness to allow conservative evangelical Christian Republicans to gain and keep control of seats of power in the government of the United States.

Weyrich publicly rejected accusations that he wanted America to become a theocracy, saying:

Some political observers may see the presence of religious conservatives in the Republican Party as a threat. My former friend Kevin Phillips [author of American Theocracy], who in the early days of the New Right was so helpful, now acts as if a theocracy governs the nation. Phillips was the architect of President Richard M. Nixon's Southern strategy, which worked brilliantly until Nixon did himself in. Now that the South does have the upper hand in the Republican Party Phillips is bitter about it. I see no theocracy here. As someone who has helped the religious right transition to the political process, I would have nothing to do with something akin to Iran translated into Americanize.

=== Criticism of conservatives and homosexuality ===
Weyrich also often made an issue out of what he claimed were his fellow conservatives' behavior and abuse of power, and he encouraged a grassroots movement in conservatism he called "the next conservatism", which he said should work to "restore America" from the bottom up. Illustrating his point, Weyrich drew a comparison between "how the Christian church grew amidst a decaying Roman Empire" and "how the next conservatism can restore an American republic as a falling America Empire collapses around us."

He advocated a revival of the House Un-American Activities Committee and the Senate Internal Security Subcommittee of the U.S. Senate Committee on the Judiciary, with the aim of identifying and removing communists from the media, which he contended still harbors infiltrators from the former Soviet Union:

From what Igor Gaidar told me, we needed to have revived these committees with a focus not so much on Hollywood but on the media itself. We know that one New York Times reporter, who always portrayed Stalin as Good Old Uncle Joe, was in fact a Communist and operated for decades on the Times staff. Were there any more? How about the Washington Post? ... Why not reconstitute these two committees and let them work hand in glove with the FBI. That is what happened before 1965. J. Edgar Hoover would often suggest good targets to be investigated.

In a 2006 interview with Michele Norris of National Public Radio about the 2006 Mark Foley scandal, Weyrich expressed his views regarding homosexuality:

Weyrich: It has been known for many years that Congressman Foley was a homosexual. Homosexuals tend to be preoccupied with sex—the idea that he should be continued, or should have been continued as chairman on the Committee for Missing and Exploited Children, given their knowledge of that is just outrageous (Interview at 1:08).

Norris: Now, before we go on, I think I can say, Mr. Weyrich, that there're quite a few people who would take exception to the statement that homosexuals are preoccupied with sex.
Weyrich: Well, I don't care whether they take exception to it—it happens to be true.
Norris: That is your opinion.

Weyrich: Well, it's not my opinion, it's the opinion of many psychologists and psychiatrists who have to deal with them. (Interview at 1:40)

=== Culture war letter ===
Frustrated with public indifference to the Clinton–Lewinsky scandal, Weyrich wrote a letter in February 1999 stating that he believed conservatives had lost the culture war, urging a separatist strategy where conservatives ought to live apart from corrupted mainstream society and form their own parallel institutions:

I believe that we probably have lost the culture war. That doesn't mean the war is not going to continue, and that it isn't going to be fought on other fronts. But in terms of society in general, we have lost. This is why, even when we win in politics, our victories fail to translate into the kind of policies we believe are important.

Therefore, what seems to me a legitimate strategy for us to follow is to look at ways to separate ourselves from the institutions that have been captured by the ideology of Political Correctness, or by other enemies of our traditional culture.

What I mean by separation is, for example, what the homeschoolers have done. Faced with public school systems that no longer educate but instead 'condition' students with the attitudes demanded by Political Correctness, they have seceded. They have separated themselves from public schools and have created new institutions, new schools, in their homes.

I think that we have to look at a whole series of possibilities for bypassing the institutions that are controlled by the enemy. If we expend our energies on fighting on the "turf" they already control, we will probably not accomplish what we hope, and we may spend ourselves to the point of exhaustion.

This was widely interpreted as Weyrich calling for a retreat from politics, but he almost immediately issued a clarification stating this was not his intent. In the evangelical magazine World he wrote:

... [W]hen critics say in supposed response to me that 'before striking our colors in the culture wars, Christians should at least put up a fight,' I am puzzled. Of course they should. That is exactly what I am urging them to do. The question is not whether we should fight, but how. ...In essence, I said that we need to change our strategy. Instead of relying on politics to retake the culturally and morally decadent institutions of contemporary America, I said that we should separate from those institutions and build our own.

By 2004, Weyrich was reportedly more hopeful, given trends in public opinion and the reelection of President George W. Bush. In spite of his initial support for Bush, he often disagreed with Bush administration policies. Examples of their disagreement included the Iraq War, immigration, Harriet Miers, and fiscal policy.

After the fall of the Soviet Union, Weyrich made many trips to Russia and was a supporter of a close Russia-United States relationship.

== Personal life ==
Weyrich and his wife, Joyce Anne (née Smigun), who resided with him in Annandale, Virginia, had five children and 13 grandchildren.

== Spinal injury and disability ==
In 1996, Weyrich fell on black ice and was diagnosed with arachnoiditis, a spinal injury. From 2001 until his death in 2008, his injury left him in a wheelchair and in chronic pain. In July 2005, complications from the injury required bilateral, below-the-knee amputation of his legs.

== Death ==
On December 18, 2008, Weyrich visited Inova Fair Oaks Hospital in Fairfax, Virginia, for routine tests, and died there at age 66. His cause of death was not released. In addition to his spinal injury and amputation, Weyrich had been diagnosed previously with Type 2 diabetes. On December 22, 2008, he was interred in Fairfax Memorial Park in Fairfax, Virginia.
