= 1972 United States Senate election in Virginia =

- November 7, 1972
- Turnout: 44.7%
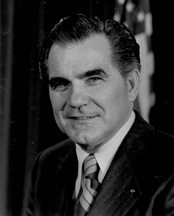

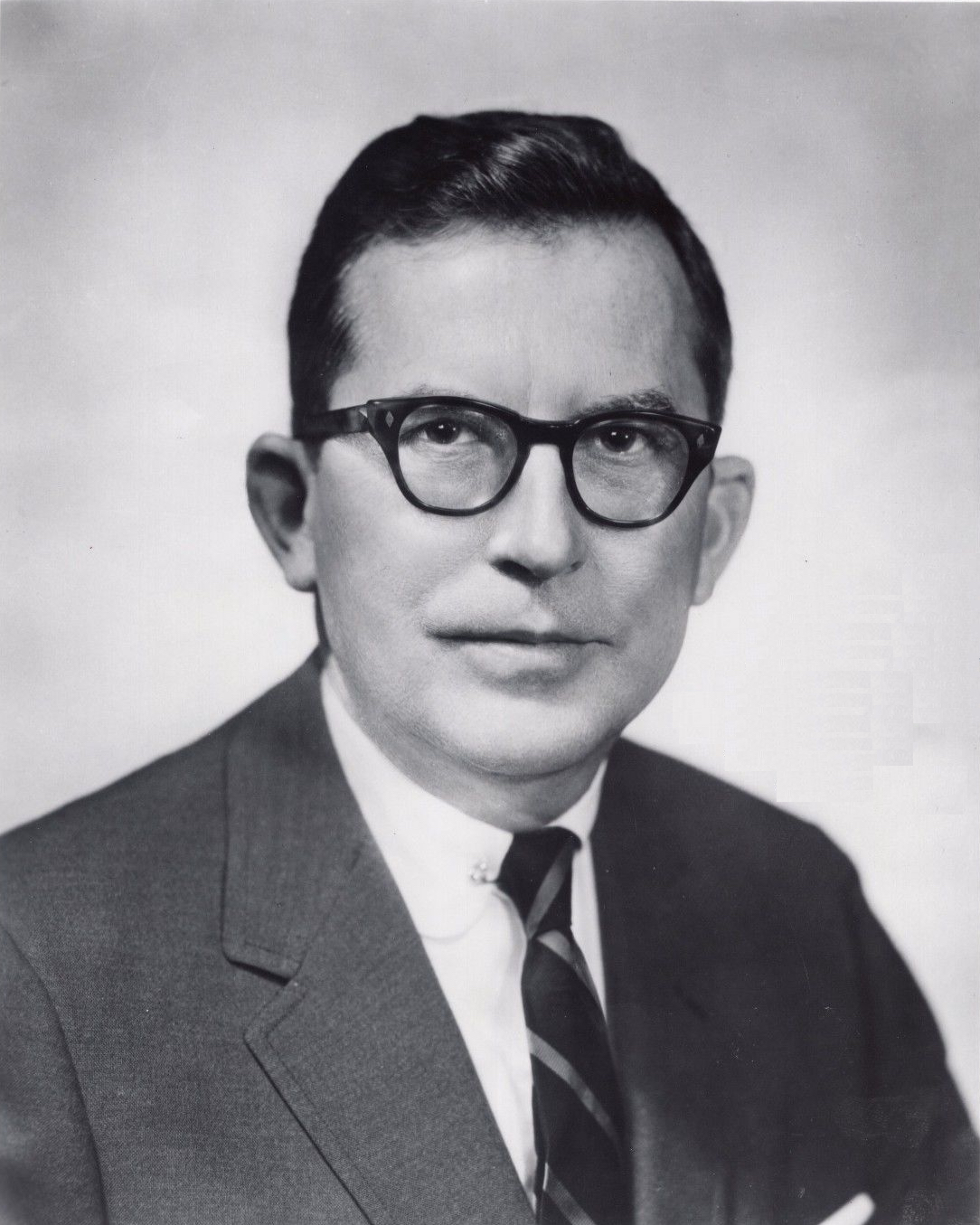
Nominee	William L. Scott	William Spong, Jr.
Party	Republican	Democratic
Popular vote	718,337	643,963
Percentage	51.45%	46.12%
- County and independent city results Scott: 40–50% 50–60% 60–70% 70–80% Spong: 40–50% 50–60% 60–70%
U.S. senator before election
William B. Spong, Jr.
Democratic
Elected U.S. Senator
William Lloyd Scott
Republican

The 1972 United States Senate election in Virginia was held on November 7, 1972. Republican U.S. Representative William L. Scott defeated incumbent Democratic Senator William Spong Jr.. Scott was the first Republican U.S. Senator from Virginia to be elected in over a century, as the most recent Republican senator was John F. Lewis, who had served during the Reconstruction era until 1875.

He was the first Republican to ever win this seat, and the first non-Democrat since 1889. This is the last time a candidate not named Warner won Virginia's Class 2 Senate seat.

== General election ==
=== Candidates ===
- Horace H. Henderson (Independent)
- William Lloyd Scott, U.S. representative from Fairfax (Republican)
- William B. Spong, Jr., incumbent U.S. senator (Democratic)

=== Results ===
United States Senate election in Virginia, 1972
Party	Candidate	Votes	%	±%
Republican	William Lloyd Scott	718,337	51.45%	+22.05%
Democratic	William B. Spong, Jr. (incumbent)	643,963	46.12%	−12.48%
Independent	Horace E. Henderson	33,912	2.43%	
Write-ins		56	<0.01%	−0.01%
Majority		74,374	5.33%	−19.77%
Turnout		1,396,268		
Republican gain from Democratic				

== See also ==
- 1972 United States Senate elections
