= Free Congress Research and Education Foundation =

American conservative think tank

- Abbreviation: FCF
- Successor: American Opportunity
- Formation: 1977 (49 years ago)
- Founder: Paul Weyrich
- Founded at: Washington, D.C.
- Type: nonprofit
- Tax ID no.: 52-1096057
- Legal status: 501(c)(3)
- Purpose: economic education and policy
- Locations: Washington, D.C., United States; Alexandria, Virginia, United States
- Key people: Paul Weyrich; Michael Lind; Jim Gilmore

The Free Congress Research and Education Foundation, also known as the Free Congress Foundation or FCF, was an American conservative think tank founded by Paul Weyrich and based near Capitol Hill in Washington, D.C.

After Weyrich's death in 2008, the Foundation was headed by former Virginia governor Jim Gilmore. Under Gilmore's leadership, the Free Congress Foundation was refocused on economic issues and not social issues. Eventually, the entire organization was renamed to American Opportunity, and is now based in Alexandria, Virginia.

== Origin ==
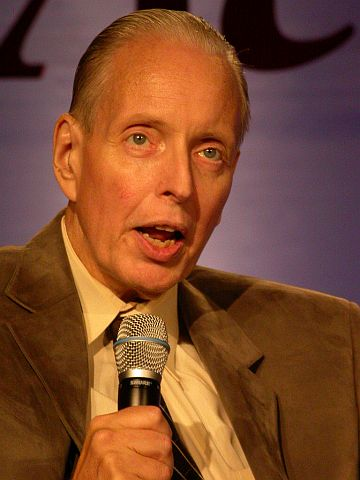
Paul Weyrich, FCF's founder

In the 1970s, the AFL-CIO-backed National Committee for an Effective Congress was highly influential. In 1974, in part to counteract its influence, Paul Weyrich founded the Committee for the Survival of a Free Congress (CSFC). The name was created in response to AFL-CIO leader George Meaney's brag that he wanted to elect a "veto-proof Congress".

CSFC was incorporated as a Political Action Committee. The post-Nixon Campaign Finance Reform law had recently created the political action committee as a legal entity. It was the second conservative PAC, the first being Terry Dolan's NCPAC - National Conservative PAC. Paul Weyrich had grown up in blue-collar labor union Racine, Wisconsin, and seen how labor unions did grassroots politics. Through CSFC, Weyrich taught Republicans how to do grassroots electoral politics.

Prior to CSFC, Weyrich had co-founded The Heritage Foundation a 501(c) (3) think tank. The board of Heritage was predominantly northeastern fiscal conservatives, and after Roe v. Wade was decided, they refused to engage on the abortion issue. That prompted Weyrich's organization of a PAC. CSFC was a pioneer in political direct mail fundraising.

The Political Report was published weekly by CSFC. Edited initially by Susan Marshner Arico and later by Stuart Rothenberg, t was a highly accurate, thoroughly objective analysis of different Congressional and Senate races, so objective that it became the first project of the Free Congress Research and Education Foundation, a 501(c)(3) which Weyrich organized in 1979. A few years later Coalitions for America was organized as a 501(c)(4) lobby organization.

== Activist training ==
Since its inception, FCF has trained conservatives in basic techniques of activism and election campaigns.

In 2001, the Foundation published "The Integration of Theory and Practice", an activist strategic plan which called for a new approach to activism and the creation of conservative parallel institutions as a counter to existing institutions, which it argued were dominated by the Left.

== Krieble Institute ==
Another initiative taken on by the foundation was the training of anti-communists in Eastern Europe and the former Soviet Union. This Institute bore the name of Robert Krieble, the primary donor to these activities.

Through the Krieble Institute, "Bob [Krieble] produced the first political commercials ever run on Ukrainian television. They promoted Ukrainian independence. And when 89 percent of the voters agreed with that message, their democratic will drove the last nail into the Soviet coffin."

== Privacy ==
The foundation's Center for Technology Policy and Coalition for Constitutional Liberties has opposed the USA PATRIOT Act, ECHELON, a national ID card and other measures often supported by conservatives for fighting crime, terrorism and illegal immigration.

== Judicial nominations ==
FCF has been involved in the judicial nominations battles since the early 1980s. Its Center for Law and Democracy and its Coalition for Judicial Restraint have criticized Republican Senators for not being aggressive enough in blocking liberal nominees or in confirming certain conservatives. The CLD has also researched and publicized information about nominees' decisions and writings, either to attack or defend them.

The FCF has promoted what it sees as a philosophy of judicial restraint, in which judges largely defer to the elected branches of government on controversial political and cultural decisions. The individual most closely associated with this philosophy-and the chief exponent for the Free Congress Foundation's views on this subject for many years-is Thomas Jipping, who has made numerous appearances on television and radio, as well as in both print and online media, supporting conservative judicial nominations put forward by the Bush administration and conversely, opposing what he considered liberal nominees chosen by the previous Clinton administration.

== Cultural conservatism ==
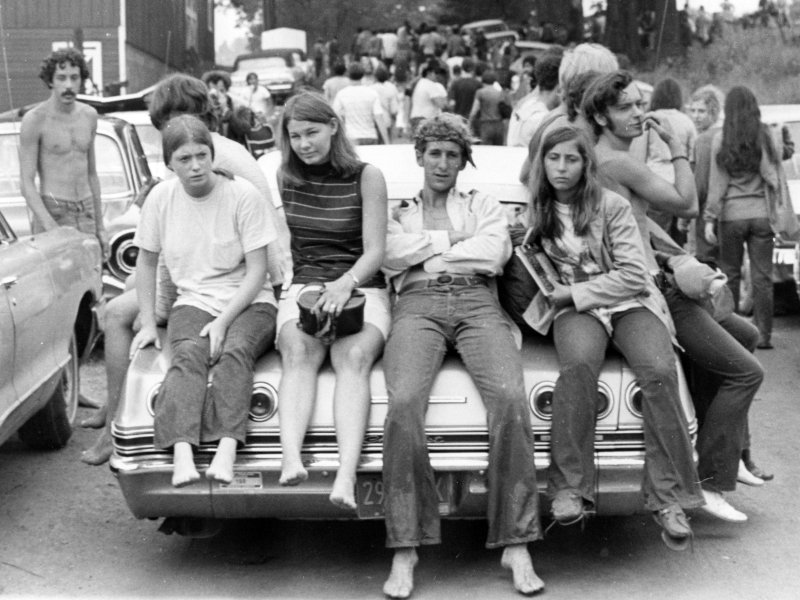
The Woodstock festival in 1969. According to FCF founder Paul Weyrich, the counterculture is now mainstream, so traditional values cannot be restored through politics but can be promoted by alternative institutions.

FCF played a founding role in galvanizing religious conservative political activism. By the late 1990s, Weyrich declared that social conservatives were no longer a majority having a liberal agenda forced on them by an elite but rather are a dwindling minority that have lost control over the culture; that traditional culture and the counterculture have traded places. He acknowledged the need for continued political involvement as a matter of self-defense but stated that politics could not restore traditional values or, in his views, hopeless efforts to recapture institutions such as prestige media, academia and mainline churches that had been lost to the left.

Instead he urged conservatives to invest their time and money in alternative institutions, which would, in his viewpoint, eventually become the norm due to the superior efficacy of traditional values. This sparked a firestorm of criticism from other conservatives, who accused Weyrich of giving up.

The ideas on "Cultural Marxism" promoted by the FCF influenced Anders Behring Breivik, who was responsible for the 2011 Norway attacks.

== Foreign policy and defense ==
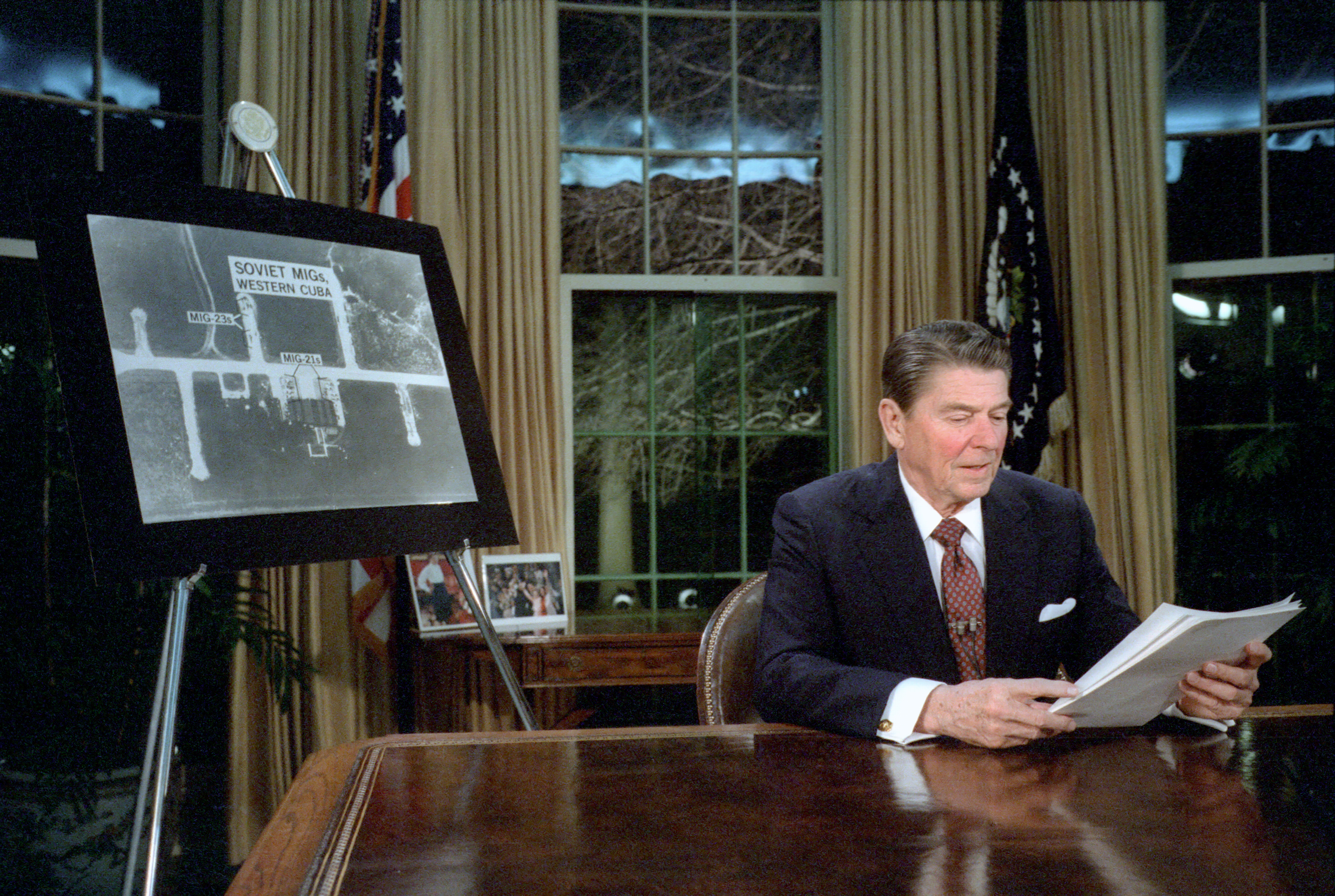
President Ronald Reagan delivering his Strategic Defense Initiative speech; FCF strongly supported the Strategic Defense Initiative, but were later restrained in their support for the War on terrorism following the September 11 attacks.

FCF took a hardline anti-communist stance in the Cold War, rejecting détente and arms control and supporting efforts to overthrow communist governments. However, other than Strategic Defense Initiative which it strongly backed, FCF did not fully endorse the Reagan program of spending on expensive weapon systems, a stance it continues to this day. It remains hostile to Communist China.

FCF has been friendlier to post-communist Serbia and Russia than most contemporary conservatives. It was against US intervention in the Balkans, leaning more toward the Orthodox Christian Serbs than the Muslim Bosnians and Albanians.

== Economics and trade ==
FCF departs from other conservative institutions in endorsing a protectionist approach on international trade. Furthermore, it is not as purely free-market, supporting government efforts in mass transit and privacy protection. These included its publishing a quarterly magazine, The New Electric Railway Journal, from 1988 to 1996, with FCF's Paul Weyrich and William S. Lind being its Publisher and Associate Publisher, respectively. It also supported mainstream conservative views on fiscal policy, calling for reduced spending and taxes.

== Broadcast efforts ==
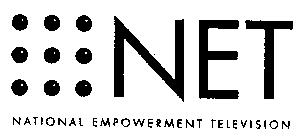
The logo of National Empowerment Television logo

Weyrich promoted a view that the mainstream news and entertainment media exhibit a liberal bias. In response, in 1993, FCF launched a Washington, D.C.–based satellite television station called National Empowerment Television (NET). Its logo featured a square of nine dots, referring to a puzzle that cannot be solved without drawing lines "outside the box."

NET served in part as a platform for FCF and Weyrich's views and interests. For example, Weyrich was a supporter of rail and Amtrak had a program on the channel called America on Track; another program, The New Electric Railway Journal, an extension of the magazine, covered light rail. Other programs focused on FCF activity: Endangered Liberties discussed privacy issues; Legal Notebook emphasized judicial nominations, and Next Revolution covered FCF's take on social conservatism. A popular program was Direct Line with Paul Weyrich, in which the host interviewed lawmakers and other prominent figures live, permitted the public to call in directly with questions and comments and delivered a commentary in the final segment.

NET was also a broader resource for the conservative and free market movement. Many organizations bought the rights to air programs on the channel, including the National Rifle Association, the Christian Coalition, the Cato Institute, Accuracy in Media and others.

The channel featured high production values and cost a great deal and in response to donor and investor pressure for a clear focus, FCF dropped all programs not directly related to public policy and conservative activism, and rebranded the channel as NET: The Conservative NewsTalk Network, with the initials NET no longer standing for anything and the nine-dot logo replaced with one evoking the US Capitol dome. It also began news reports and updates, and a full-fledged investigative journalism program.

FCF planned to make NET a self-sustaining, even profitable commercial enterprise, rather than a money-losing tool of outreach but was unsuccessful. In a decision he later came to regret bitterly, Weyrich turned over day-to-day operation of the channel to an industry veteran who had been successful with other startups. After a power struggle which Weyrich lost, NET was rebranded again into "America's Voice", and the channel abandoned all conservative identity, marketing itself merely as a non-ideological way for the public to make its views known to policymakers. FCF had to pay to retain its four programs on the channel and after controversy over their content, even those were removed. Viewer support collapsed, and Dish Network dropped it. Eventually America's Voice was sold, becoming "The Renaissance Network" (TRN), airing on a few broadcast stations, mainly UHF and low-power channels. Facing ruin, TRN brought back FCF content but it was too little, too late, and the channel folded.

FCF also experimented with radio broadcasting, airing weekly taped programs on the Liberty Works Radio Network and other outlets.

== Center for Cultural Conservatism ==
Part of the larger Free Congress Foundation, the Center for Cultural Conservatism was headed by William S. Lind.

== Funding ==
In 2012, the Free Congress Foundation's revenues were $574,292 against expenses of $515,329. The year before, in 2011, revenue was $494,652 against expenses of $776,081.

== See also ==
- American Opportunity
