= George Soros conspiracy theories =

Theories on Hungarian-American investor

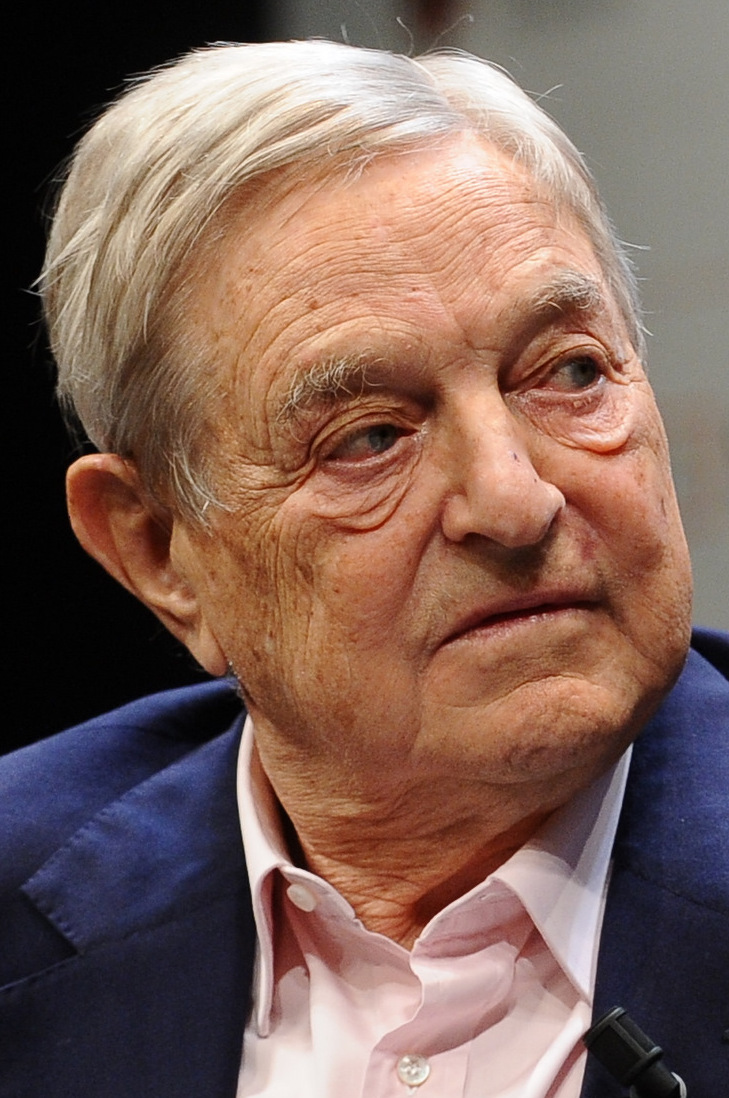
George Soros, Hungarian-born American businessman, is the subject of a number of conspiracy theories.

Hungarian-American billionaire businessman George Soros is the subject of a number of antisemitic conspiracy theories. Veronika Bondarenko, writing for Business Insider in 2017, said: "For two decades, some have seen Soros as a kind of puppet master secretly controlling the global economy and politics." The New York Times describes the allegations as moving "from the dark corners of the internet and talk radio" to "the very center of the political debate" by 2018. Professor Armin Langer has noted that Soros is "the perfect code word" for conspiracy theories that unite antisemitism and Islamophobia.

Soros conspiracies first emerged in Russian circles involving "Western anti-Kremlin civil society across the Eastern Bloc from Tbilisi to the Baltic". These conspiracies involved inverting Soros's strengths into weaknesses, a common Russian disinformation technique. Soros, a Holocaust survivor, was falsely accused of being a Nazi collaborator. As a supporter of Eastern European democracies, Soros was accused of being behind the European migrant crisis or importing migrants to European countries. Due to his anti-corruption advocacy, he was also accused of "globalist" conspiracies to overthrow governments.

The Soros conspiracies quickly spread across Europe and the United States, carrying antisemitic and Islamophobic overtones. This included efforts by the Hungarian government, under the second premiership of Viktor Orbán, as part of an election campaign demonizing Soros. Soros is cast as part of an international cabal of Jews that includes the Rothschilds, Freemasons, and Illuminati. American conservatives picked up on the thread in the late 2000s, spearheaded by Fox News. Bill O'Reilly gave an almost ten-minute monologue on Soros in 2007, calling him an "extremist" and claiming he was "off-the-charts dangerous." Online news organizations, often connected to Russian state media such as the Centre for Research on Globalization, would also publish and help spread conspiracies.

== Background ==
Antisemitic conspiracies about a Jewish world order or Jewish people as tools of the antichrist have existed for centuries. Scholars agree many of these conspiracies were adapted to a modern era when The Protocols of the Elders of Zion was published in 1905. The fraudulent text was developed by the Tsarist secret police of Russia and claimed to expose a Jewish plot of world domination.

The antisemitic conspiracies that were modernized through the Protocols were then applied to George Soros's narratives. Soros's philanthropic efforts with the Open Society, founded in 1979, supported democracy movements in Eastern Europe and funded liberal causes in Western democracies. After the fall of Soviet Russia, Soros began funding academic and grant programs. In fact, his activity in Russia became so pronounced that Russians developed a word, "Sorosovat", meaning to seek a grant from any quarter. By the mid-1980s, the KGB had sought to discredit Soros's reputation.

Non-governmental organizations became targets of scrutiny in Russia. In 1995, Nezavisimaya Gazeta published a Federal Counterintelligence Service report which accused the Soros-funded International Science Fund of espionage. In 1999, Dmitry Ryurikov, a foreign affairs advisor to Boris Yeltsin, would give a speech at the Nixon Center in Washington D.C. and blame NGOs, and Soros specifically, for being part of the New World Order trying to destroy Russia. In 2015, Russia passed a series of anti-NGO laws. Many of the Soros conspiracies and links to antisemitic tropes are tied to the framing of NGOs as being connected to the New World Order, international bankers, or the antichrist.

== 1990s ==
George Soros's conspiracies emerged from disinformation campaigns in the late 1990s. The earliest connection to antisemitic tropes researchers have identified was in 1992 when far-right Hungarian Justice and Life Party leader István Csurka used imagery of Soros as being part of a Jewish global conspiracy.

In the early 1990s, Soros was accused of being involved in an Anglo-French-Jewish-liberal conspiracy against Croatia and Germany.

As Russian Intelligence began to report that American non-profits, especially Soros's Open Society, were undermining sovereignty in Russia and Eastern Europe, conspiracy theories about Soros began to spread. Anthropologist Ivan Kalmar writes that it is "not clear where the Soros Myth began... A likely candidate for the dubious honour of originating it is the Executive Intelligence Review, founded by the far-right American commentator Lyndon LaRouche. An article in the November 1, 1996 edition accuses the financier of manipulating the world's finances in partnership with the Rothschilds, who 'launched Soros's career'", citing a piece by writer F. William Engdahl. Similarly, author Michael Wohlraich identifies Engdahl as the first US populariser of Soros conspiracy theories, noting the same text. This has been described by the anti-fascist group Unicorn Riot as "an example of the antisemitic "rootless cosmopolitan" trope.

Soros's conspiracies were often found in the pages of LaRouche's Executive Intelligence Review. In 1996, articles were published about Soros's drug legalization conspiracies while Bill Clinton was negotiating a crime bill. In 1997 LaRouche's publication began to cover Soros as a source of destabilization in Central and South America over critical minerals. Soros was also accused of running secret armies on behalf of the British Government in 1997.

In 1997, during the Asian financial crisis, the prime minister of Malaysia, Mahathir Mohamad, accused Soros of using the wealth under his control to punish the Association of Southeast Asian Nations (ASEAN) for welcoming Myanmar as a member. With a history of antisemitic remarks, Mahathir made specific reference to Soros's Jewish background ("It is a Jew who triggered the currency plunge"), and implied Soros was orchestrating the crash as part of a larger Jewish conspiracy. Nine years later, in 2006, Mahathir met with Soros and afterward stated that he accepted that Soros had not been responsible for the crisis. In 1998's The Crisis of Global Capitalism: Open Society Endangered, Soros explained his role in the crisis as follows:

The financial crisis that originated in Thailand in 1997 was particularly unnerving because of its scope and severity ... By the beginning of 1997, it was clear to Soros Fund Management that the discrepancy between the trade account and the capital account was becoming untenable. We sold short the Thai baht and the Malaysian ringgit early in 1997 with maturities ranging from six months to a year. (That is, we entered into contracts to deliver at future dates Thai baht and Malaysian ringgit that we did not currently hold.) Subsequently, Prime Minister Mahathir of Malaysia accused me of causing the crisis, a wholly unfounded accusation. We were not sellers of the currency during or several months before the crisis; on the contrary, we were buyers when the currencies began to decline—we were purchasing ringgits to realize the profits on our earlier speculation. (Much too soon, as it turned out. We left most of the potential gain on the table because we were afraid that Mahathir would impose capital controls. He did so, but much later.)

== 2000s ==
In 2002, CovertAction Quarterly, now CovertAction Magazine, which is known for propaganda and disinformation published a George Soros article by Heather Coffin entitled "George Soros: Imperial Wizard." The article blamed Soros for the 2000 "coup" in Yugoslavia.

Many of the conspiracies tied to Soros revolved around him organizing the Color Revolutions in countries formerly occupied by the Soviet Union. Serbia's Bulldozer Revolution in 2000, Georgia's Rose Revolution of 2003, and Ukraine's Orange Revolution of 2004 all helped spark conspiracy theories about Soros.

In 2004, Richard Carlson, father of Tucker Carlson, former US Ambassador to the Seychelles, and lobbyist for Viktor Orbán, wrote about Soros's Potemkin Village approach to Georgia. These pro-democracy movements began with Otpor in Serbia, and quickly spread across Eastern Europe in countries formerly occupied by Russia.

In 2004, FrontPage Magazine, edited by David Horowitz and published by the David Horowitz Freedom Center (DHFC), began publishing stories featuring Soros conspiracies. This included a two-part series by Dr. Rachel Ehrenfeld and Shawn Macomber on Soros, "The Man Who Would Be Kingmaker".

In 2005, Soros's conspiracies about the Color Revolutions spread in Lithuania. The newspaper Respublika published a series of articles that attacked the non-governmental organizations and civil and human rights groups. Activists in Lithuania were labeled "Sorosologists". In 2006, David Horowitz began to write about connections between Soros and a "Shadow Party" controlling the Democratic Party in the United States. By 2008, the Freedom Center was publishing articles by Michelle Malkin connecting criticisms of Soros to globalist conspiracies.

Soros's criticisms connected to conspiracies about globalism also spread in the United States in 2005. Peter Schweizer, who has written other books of debunked conspiracies, published Do as I Say (Not as I Do) in 2005. The book purported to uncover liberal hypocrisy involving Soros. Schweizer made claims, using publicly available documents as evidence, that Soros used tax shelters to avoid bills and also invested in industries he condemned.

Soros became a target of Fox News journalists. In April 2007, Bill O'Reilly included a 10-minute segment on The O'Reilly Factor about Soros, whom he described as "off-the-charts dangerous" and "an extremist who wants open borders, a one-world foreign policy, legalized drugs, euthanasia."

During the 2008 presidential campaign in the United States, Soros's conspiracies were tied to disinformation campaigns about the Association of Community Organizations for Reform Now, known as ACORN. These were often tied to labeling Barack Obama as a secret Soros-funded communist who utilized the Cloward-Piven Strategy. After Glenn Beck first mentioned this strategy in March 2009, he mentioned it at least 32 times in the next twelve months, connecting Soros and other elites to Barack Obama.

In 2008, Michelle Malkin would publish an editorial in the National Review criticizing Soros. Her article made references to criticism of a "Soros Slush Fund" being the brainchild of Barack Obama.

Glenn Beck was another Fox News host known to spread conspiracy theories about Soros. In 2009, Beck used a hand-written chart illustrating an alleged left-wing conspiracy linking ACORN, the Service Employees International Union and its president, Andy Stern, to Soros and the Barack Obama campaign.

In 2008, George Birnbaum and Arthur Finkelstein worked on the election campaign of Viktor Orbán; deciding that Orbán needed an enemy, they conducted survey research, after which they settled on Soros, because, according to Birnbaum, "enough people in Hungary didn't like the idea of this billionaire behind the curtain, almost like… the Wizard of Oz, controlling politics and policy." Orbán's efforts to redefine Soros as a villain took the Soros conspiracies mainstream.

In 2009, the Canadian online news outlet Canada Free Press, known for making dubious claims, published an article by Jim O'Niell on Soros that accused him of illegal market manipulation, being a felony insider trader, and a villain.

== 2010s ==
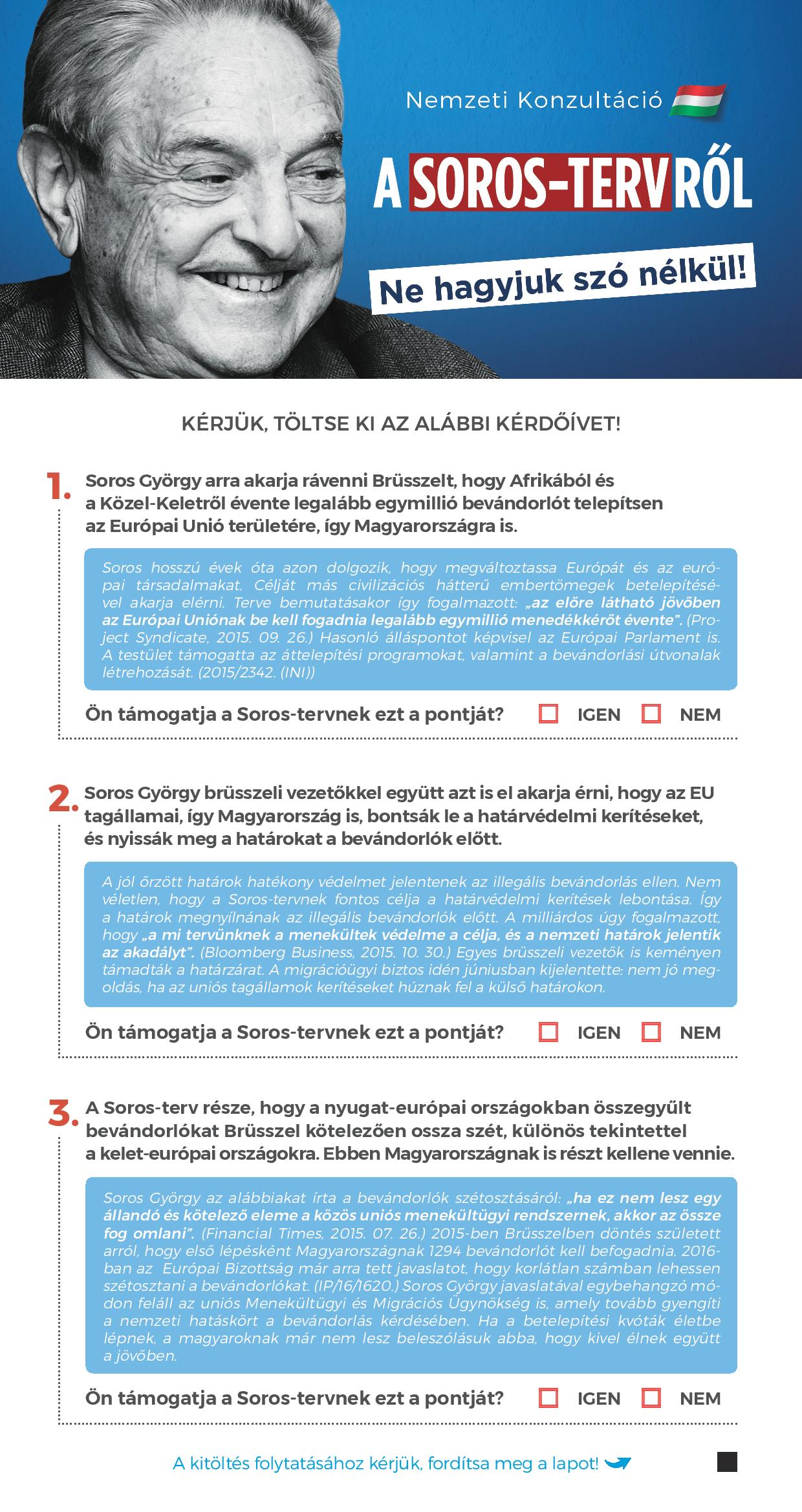
2017 Hungarian anti-Soros government campaign propaganda

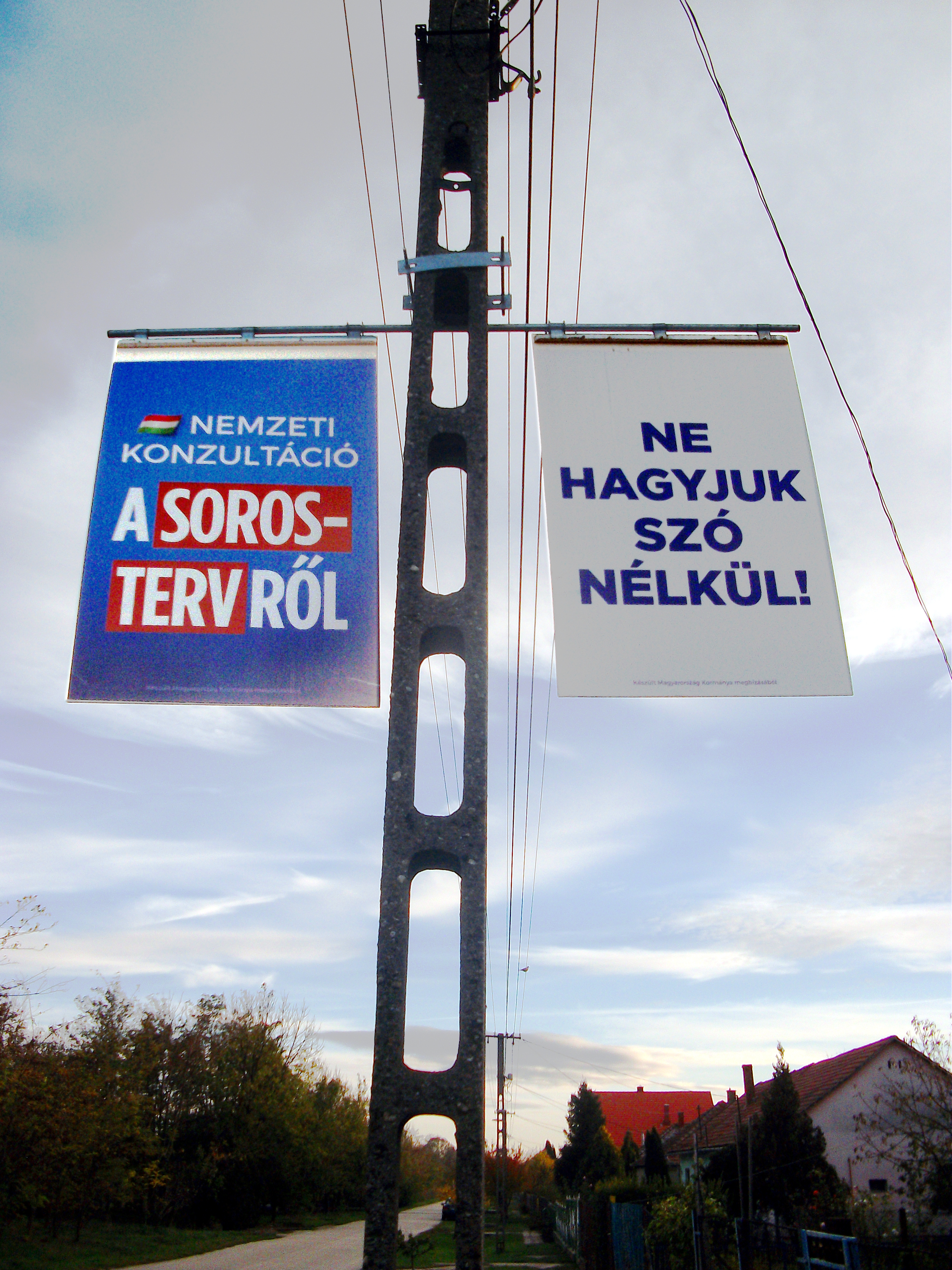
2017 Billboards of national consultation on the Soros plan in Zichyújfalu, Fejér County, Hungary

In the 2010s, conspiracy theories about George Soros grew globally.

Soros conspiracies played a strong role in Hungarian elections in 2010 with the addition of George Birnbaum and Arthur Finkelstein to the campaign. The Presidential campaign of Viktor Orbán and the Hungarian government spent millions of dollars on a poster demonizing Soros.

Soros conspiracies became more common in Russian official channels. A study of military and academic journals, from 2008 to 2018, found a notable increase in Soros mentions, taking on a more conspiratorial tone. The Problem of National Security would mention Soros 43 times across 23 articles, and the phrase "New World Order" would get mentioned 60 times over 34 articles. The Military-Industrial Courier would mention Soros 41 times over 14 articles from 2009 to 2018 and "New World Over" 92 times across 59 articles. Russian television, which came under greater state control, also began to reinforce a narrative tying Soros to a New World Order.

Soros Conspiracies began to spread in Polish right-wing media and parties in 2016.

The 3 April 2016 release date of the Panama Papers, also called Offshoregate (Russian: "Офшоргейта") was just before Vladimir Putin's largest annual press conference, the All-Russian Popular Front (ONF) "Truth and Justice" in St. Petersburg (Russian: Медиа-форум Общероссийского народного фронта (ОНФ) «Правда и справедливость» в Санкт-Петербурге) which was held 4–7 April 2016. During this press conference, Vladimir Putin stated that Julian Assange's WikiLeaks told him that Soros and his Open Society Foundations had provided funding for Offshoregate and, on behalf of the Kremlin, Dmitry Peskov stated that Offshoregate was intended to denigrate (Russian: "вброс") "Putin and Russia personally".

After being ousted from office in the wake of the aforementioned Panama Papers scandal, Icelandic Prime Minister Sigmundur Davíð Gunnlaugsson accused Soros of having bankrolled a conspiracy to remove him from power. It was later noted that Soros himself had also been implicated in the Panama Papers, casting doubt on the prime minister's theory.

Soros's opposition to Brexit led to a front page on the United Kingdom's Conservative Party-supporting newspaper The Daily Telegraph in February 2018, which was accused of antisemitism for claiming he was involved in a supposed "secret plot" for the country's voters to reverse the 2016 United Kingdom European Union membership referendum. While The Daily Telegraph did not mention that Soros is Jewish, his opposition to Britain leaving the European Union had been reported elsewhere in less conspiratorial terms. Stephen Pollard, editor of The Jewish Chronicle, said on Twitter: "The point is that language matters so much and this is exactly the language being used by antisemites here and abroad." In October 2019, the then Leader of the House of Commons, Jacob Rees-Mogg, accused Soros of being the "funder-in-chief" of the Remain campaign, and was subsequently accused of antisemitism by opposition MPs.

In 2018 and 2019, in reaction to a December 20, 1998, 60 Minutes interview of Soros, in which Soros related his experiences of when the Nazis occupied his native Hungary when he was 13 years old, right-wing figures such as Alex Jones, Dinesh D'Souza, Glenn Beck, Roseanne Barr, James Woods, Ann Coulter, Louie Gohmert, Marjorie Taylor Greene, and Donald Trump Jr., promulgated the false conspiracy theory, which has been described as antisemitic, that Soros was a Nazi collaborator who turned in other Jews and stole their property during the occupation.

In 2018, Black Cube, a private intelligence agency of Israeli origins, supported Viktor Orban's virulently anti-Semitic re-election campaign, acquiring taped telephone conversations of individuals associated with Soros, who was actively opposing Orban's re-election. According to Israeli politician Tamar Zandberg, Hungary was "carrying out an antisemitic campaign against Soros" and that Benjamin Netanyahu, whose Likud party she said has dangerous ties to "extreme right-wing parties in Europe", openly supported Orban's anti-Semitic re-election campaign. She stated that Black Cube's support for Orban is an "Israeli embarrassment."

In October 2018, Soros was accused of funding the Central American migrant caravans heading toward the United States. The theory that Soros was causing Central American migration at the southern US border apparently dates back to late March 2018. The October 2018 strain of the theory has been described to combine antisemitism, anti-immigrant sentiment, and "the specter of powerful foreign agents controlling major world events in pursuit of a hidden agenda", connecting Soros and other wealthy individuals of Jewish faith or background to the October caravan. Then-US President Donald Trump was among those promoting the conspiracy theory. Both Cesar Sayoc, the perpetrator of the October 2018 attempted bombings of prominent Democratic Party officials, and Robert Bowers, the perpetrator of the Pittsburgh synagogue shooting, referred to this conspiracy theory on social media before their crimes.

In November 2018, Turkish President Recep Tayyip Erdoğan denounced Soros while speaking about the political purges in Turkey, saying: "The person who financed terrorists during the Gezi incidents is already in prison. And who is behind him? The famous Hungarian Jew Soros. This is a man who assigns people to divide nations and shatter them."

In 2018 Slovak Prime Minister Robert Fico would accuse Soros of destabilizing the country by trying to influence President Andrej Kiska. After the murder of investigative journalist Ján Kuciak Kiska called for reforms in Slovokia. The murder of Ján Kuciak and his fiancée lead to the strongest anti-government protests in Slovak history. Fico accused Kiska of planning to use the murder to take down his Government in conjunction with Soros.

In November 2019, attorney Joseph diGenova, who is known for promoting conspiracy theories about the Department of Justice and the FBI, asserted on Fox News without evidence that Soros "controls a very large part of the career foreign service of the United States State Department" and "also controls the activities of FBI agents overseas who work for NGOs – work with NGOs. That was very evident in Ukraine." Soros's Open Society Foundations described diGenova's claims as "beyond rhetorical ugliness, beyond fiction, beyond ludicrous" and requested that Fox News provide an on-air retraction of diGenova's claims and stop providing diGenova with a platform. Although the network never publicly announced it had banned him, diGenova has not appeared on Fox following the incident. In September 2020, diGenova suggested that Fox News is also controlled by Soros.

== 2020s ==
A study by Zignal Labs found that unsubstantiated claims of involvement by Soros were one of three dominant themes in misinformation and conspiracy theories around the 2020 George Floyd protests, alongside claims that Floyd's murder had been faked and claims of involvement by antifa groups. The Anti-Defamation League estimated that over four days after Floyd's murder, negative Twitter messages about Soros increased from about 20,000 per day to about 500,000 per day.

QAnon, which began on 4chan in 2017, made Soros a central character in COVID-19 vaccination conspiracies by 2020. The stories connected to Soros and vaccinations grew in Poland. QAnon connections to Soros conspiracies were also found in the far-right of Hungary and Romania.

Soros conspiracies were also connected to the Yellow Vest protests in France from 2018 to 2020. These efforts were traced back to GRU Unit 54777.

Soros conspiracy theories came up frequently during the 2020 United States presidential election between Donald Trump and Joe Biden as antisemitic dog whistles, including conspiracy theories about Soros being connected to the COVID-19 pandemic. In March 2020, Michael Caputo, Donald Trump's Health and Human Services Secretary, tweeted a photo of Soros captioned "[t]he real virus behind everything" and "Are you kidding? Soros's political agenda REQUIRES a pandemic."

After the July 2020 Armenian–Azerbaijani clashes on the border, the president of Azerbaijan, Ilham Aliyev, stated that the 2018 Armenian revolution was "another provocation by Soros and his entourage", and called the government of the prime minister of Armenia, Nikol Pashinyan, the "agents of the Soros Foundation", citing the aid for the COVID-19 pandemic in Armenia by the Soros Foundation. Aliyev added that there were "no traces of the Soros Foundation in Azerbaijan" because it had "cut off their legs", as they were "poisoning the minds of youth", turning them "against their state". During the height of the 2020 Nagorno-Karabakh war in October, Aliyev labeled Soros's activities a "destructive, movement, and a colonial movement". He also added that Soros "came to power in Armenia today, but failed."

During the 2022 Brazilian general election, Ciro Gomes, the presidential candidate of the centre-left Democratic Labour Party, claimed in various campaign adverts that the Socialism and Liberty Party was funded by Soros. These adverts were ordered to be removed by the Superior Electoral Court.

With Russia's invasion of Ukraine in 2022, conspiracies connecting Soros to supposed biolabs in Ukraine also began to spread. Conspiracies, such as those in Serbia, often stated Soros funded biolabs in Ukraine. QAnon, and far-right parties in Germany were also essential in spreading Russian disinformation about biolabs that Soros funded. Narratives about Soros supporting laboratories in Ukraine also spread among American QAnon and far-right politicians.

In 2022 Viktor Orbán gave a speech at the American conservative political conference CPAC, in which he said, "Don't be afraid to call your enemies by their name. They will never show mercy. Consider for a moment George Soros. I know George Soros very well. He is my opponent. He believes in none of the things that we do."

When Donald Trump was indicted by Manhattan District Attorney Alvin Bragg in 2023, numerous Republicans claimed that Bragg was "bought and paid for" by Soros. This claim was promoted and spread by Trump himself as well as Ron DeSantis, Senator JD Vance, Senator Ron Johnson, Texas Governor Greg Abbott, Representative Anna Paulina Luna, and Representative Paul Gosar, who called Bragg a "Soros D.A.". The only actual connection is that Soros donated to the progressive criminal justice reform group Color of Change, which contributed to Bragg's campaign. Soros was only one of many donors to Color of Change, and he had no contact with Bragg, whom he has never met.

Also in 2023, Tesla, Inc./SpaceX CEO and owner of social media platform X (formerly known as Twitter) Elon Musk compared Soros to Jewish Marvel Comics supervillain Magneto and accused him of wanting "to erode the very fabric of civilization" because he "hates humanity". He later alleged that the Soros organization wants "nothing less than the destruction of western civilization" in reply to a X user speculating about a "George Soros-led invasion" of Europe by North African immigrants.

In early 2025, massive student protests broke out in Belgrade, Serbia. Social media and pro-government media were inundated with messaging blaming Soros and USAID for the protests. People began to gather after a train station roof collapsed in the city of Novi Sad, Serbia, killing 16 people. Official government channels blaming Soros were designed to delegitimize the protests.

Soros's conspiracies continued to spread in the United States after the re-election of Donald Trump in 2024. After the Charlie Kirk assassination in 2025, the United States Vice President JD Vance accused Soros of sponsoring groups behind the killing. Vance said Soros's Open Society Foundations were “setting fire to the house built by the American family over 250 years.” In August 2025, Donald Trump threatened to arrest Soros under the Racketeer Influenced and Corrupt Organizations Act for funding "violent protests". Following Trump's spreading of the antisemitic conspiracy theories, the Department of Justice directed staff to begin investigating Soros. At Turning Point USA's 2025 AmericaFest convention, JD Vance contrasted the convention participants as "freethinkers" and not "drones who take their orders from George Soros".

In November 2025, Bulgaria's main pro-Russian and nationalist party, Movement for Rights and Freedoms – New Beginning, There’s Such a People and Union, Moral and Honour, Revival, and the Bulgarian Socialist Party led efforts to pass a motion in Parliament to investigate Soros and Open Society Foundations. Oligarch Delyan Peevski, who funds the Movement for Rights and Freedoms – New Beginning, claimed that Soros-affiliated NGOs were “replacing values with gender ideology.”

After prime minister Viktor Orbán's loss in the 2026 Hungarian parliamentary election, Elon Musk wrote a post on X claiming that the Soros Organization had taken over Hungary.

== See also ==
- Antisemitic canard
- Project Esther
- Zionist Occupation Government conspiracy theory
