= Arthur J. Finkelstein =

American political consultant (1945–2017)

- Born: May 18, 1945; Brooklyn, New York, US
- Died: September 18, 2017 (aged 72); Ipswich, Massachusetts, US
- Education: Columbia University; Queens College (1967)
- Occupation: Political consultant
- Years active: 1968–2017
- Political party: Republican Party
- Spouse: Donald Curiale (m. 2004, died)

Arthur Jay Finkelstein (May 18, 1945 – August 18, 2017) was a New York state–based Republican Party (GOP) consultant who worked for conservative and right-wing candidates in the United States, Canada, Israel, Central Europe, and Eastern Europe over four decades.

Finkelstein and his brother Ronald ran a political consulting firm in Irvington, New York, where he focused on polling, strategy, messaging, media, and campaign management.

== Early life and education ==
Finkelstein grew up in a lower-middle-class Jewish family, living in Brooklyn's East New York section until age 11, then in Levittown, New York, and later Queens. He and his two brothers attended local public schools; Finkelstein ultimately graduated from Forest Hills High School. Their parents were immigrants from Eastern Europe, and the father worked as a cabdriver and did various jobs in the garment trade. While a student at Columbia University, Finkelstein interviewed and helped produce radio programs for author/philosopher Ayn Rand, and was a volunteer at the New York headquarters of the Draft Goldwater Committee in 1963–64 (the famous "Suite 3505"). He eventually earned a bachelor's degree in economics and political science from Queens College in 1967.

== Career ==
=== 1968–76: Buckley, Nixon, Helms, and Reagan ===
In 1968, Finkelstein did behind-the-scenes election analysis for NBC News, part of the network's team working under former Census director Richard M. Scammon and exit-polling pioneer Irwin A. "Bud" Lewis.

In 1969–70, he worked as a computer programmer in the Data Processing department of the New York Stock Exchange at its offices on 11 Wall Street in lower Manhattan. During this period, he was a familiar face in Greenwich Village, where he often argued politics from a street-corner soapbox. In his spare time, he aided State Senator John Marchi in his unsuccessful Republican-Conservative campaign for Mayor of New York City in 1969.

F. Clifton White, mastermind of the Draft Goldwater Committee, was Finkelstein's political patron and consulting partner in the early 1970s in the firm, DirAction Services. The young pollster's first electoral success came at age 25 in 1970, with the independent Conservative campaign of James L. Buckley for senator from New York. This was one of several New York statewide contests where he was able to maneuver his clients to victory in three-way scenarios. Buckley won a plurality upset victory over GOP incumbent Charles Goodell and favored Democrat Richard Ottinger. Of that election night, Buckley later wrote, "By 10 pm, ... Finkelstein (my volunteer analyst who called the final results within one-tenth of one percent based on a Sunday-night telephone survey) assured me that I had won." Finkelstein encapsulated Buckley's message in the catchphrase, "Isn't it about time we had a Senator?"

Finkelstein's work in New York led to his serving in 1971-72 as one of several pollsters for President Richard M. Nixon's re-election campaign developing sophisticated demographic analysis.

In 1972, Finkelstein led the first of three successful campaigns to elect Jesse Helms as a U.S. senator from North Carolina. After the election, Finkelstein worked with Helms political aides Tom Ellis and Carter Wrenn to establish a permanent conservative organization, the National Congressional Club, which lasted until 1995.

Finkelstein and White went their separate ways in the mid-1970s, and he founded his own firm, Arthur J. Finkelstein & Associates (often later shortened to AJF & Associates). In the 1976 presidential primaries, White supported Gerald Ford, while Finkelstein worked for Ronald Reagan's insurgent campaign.

He helped Helms's Congressional Club turn around the faltering Reagan effort with a victory in the April North Carolina primary. His work continued in the subsequent Texas primary. "Finkelstein had been a key figure in 1976, when he helped orchestrate Reagan's campaign-saving comeback in North Carolina" which was crucial in Reagan's further political advancement.

At Finkelstein's urging, Reagan made a major issue of the impending Panama Canal Treaties, which Gerald Ford was negotiating and which infuriated conservative voters. (This proved to be Reagan's signature issue throughout the late 1970s.) As Jules Witcover later reported, "Tens of thousands of Wallace voters were gradually cut adrift during his slide [in the primaries] ... and Reagan media man Arthur Finkelstein recruited a Wallaceite from Fort Worth to radio and television spots for Reagan ... It was dynamite." The Associated Press's Mike Robinson wrote Finkelstein was "viewed by many as instrumental in Gov. Reagan's 1976 primary successes in North Carolina and Texas."

=== 1975–80: NCPAC, Senate, and Reagan ===
Passage of the post-Watergate Federal Election Campaign Act (FECA) amendments, and the subsequent 1976 Supreme Court decision in Buckley v. Valeo, drastically altered the rules by which Presidential and Congressional contests were waged. Finkelstein was among the first to sense an opportunity, and pioneered the concept and execution of independent expenditure campaigns, which would operate as a third force in an election beyond the control of candidate or party officials.

Beginning in 1975, Finkelstein was the chief strategist behind the most successful IE operation of this period, the National Conservative Political Action Committee (NCPAC). Its Executive Director was Finkelstein protégé Terry Dolan. In 1981 New Right activist Richard Viguerie wrote, "NCPAC relies heavily on research and polling, a reflection of one of its founders, conservative pollster Arthur Finkelstein."

In 1978, NCPAC was instrumental in the defeat of Democrats Dick Clark in Iowa and Thomas J. McIntyre in New Hampshire. Both liberal senators were replaced by committed conservatives. NCPAC ran hard-hitting ads for television, radio and newspapers, crafted by Finkelstein. A central idea behind the strategy was to expose the liberal words and actions in Washington of elected officials, usually senators, whose moderate or conservative public image at home was at odds with their actual voting record.

NCPAC hit its peak in 1980, operating IEs in six states, its ads and organizing efforts helping to topple liberal Democrats in Iowa (John Culver), Indiana (Birch Bayh), Idaho (Frank Church) and South Dakota (George McGovern). Less well-known were NCPAC's TV ads in the presidential contest, both negative (one featuring Jimmy Carter in a 1976 debate, another with Edward Kennedy shouting "And no more Jimmy Carter!") and positive (footage of Ronald Reagan speaking on values); Finkelstein concentrated these ad buys in closely contested Southern states (e.g., Mississippi, Louisiana, Alabama), all of which switched from Carter to Reagan in 1980.

Finkelstein believed in the usefulness of third forces to help conservatives win elections, but not a conservative third party (a much-discussed option in the mid-1970s). At a February 1977 conference, he told activists, "The development of a third party may very well hurt conservative options in the future by diluting them," warning that traditional and emotional ties to party labels would keep many conservatives in their present parties. He said the Watergate scandal had cost the GOP the one clear advantage it had over the Democrats – the perception by voters that it was the more honest of the two parties. Nevertheless, he counseled against third-party option, saying this would succeed only in drawing conservatives out of both parties, creating a weak satellite party and leaving the major parties more liberal.

Besides NCPAC, Finkelstein found particular success during this period in guiding individual Senate and House campaigns. Reagan backer and political unknown Orrin Hatch won a resounding 56% victory in Utah in 1976 against a three-term Democratic incumbent. In 1978, he was consultant to the successful re-election campaigns of Jesse Helms in North Carolina and Strom Thurmond in South Carolina — the latter being Thurmond's last seriously contested race (he served until 2002, age 100). That same year, Finkelstein shepherded Carroll Campbell to his first win in South Carolina's Greenville-area 4th Congressional District.

After a brief interlude early in 1979 as adviser to conservative Congressman Phil Crane, Finkelstein returned as one of the pollsters advising Ronald Reagan's primary campaign. His services were also reportedly sought by the George H. W. Bush campaign.

In 1980, he engineered the improbable Senate victory of Long Island supervisor Alfonse D'Amato over incumbent Jacob Javits, another three-way contest where the Democrat (Congresswoman Liz Holtzman) was favored. He advised the successful campaign of 31-year-old State Senator Don Nickles for U.S. Senate from Oklahoma. Most unlikely was the victory (aided by National Congressional Club allies) of John East in the North Carolina Senate contest; East was a little-known professor who used a wheelchair, recruited for the race by Jesse Helms and elected through the efforts of Ellis, Wrenn, Finkelstein and the Helms organization.

Besides Campbell, House winners included Duncan Hunter in California and Denny Smith in Oregon (both 1980), the latter toppling House Ways and Means Committee chair Al Ullman. Finkelstein also had his share of Senate losses, including two by previous client James Buckley (1976, New York, and 1980, Connecticut), and with Avi Nelson (1978, Massachusetts). Finkelstein was also pollster-strategist for Maryland Congressman Robert Bauman, who narrowly lost his seat after he was charged in DC with homosexual solicitation, one month before the November election.

=== 1980s ===
During the 1980 campaign Finkelstein was a Reagan pollster and had been "aboard the Reagan campaign" since mid-1979. from the early primary days all the way through November. Having ridden (and driven) the Republican wave of 1977–80, he found the 1980s a period of consolidation, helping clients grow their base and win re-election.

In 1981, Finkelstein was one of four pollsters designated to do work on behalf of the Reagan White House, paid by the Republican National Committee. (The others were Richard Wirthlin, Robert Teeter and Tully Plesser). Newsweek reported in 1982 that "each of the President's top three advisers has his own numbers man: "Wirthlin became Edwin Meese's pollster, Teeter became James Baker's and now Finkelstein has become Michael Deaver's."

Throughout Reagan's first term and into the 1984 re-election campaign, Finkelstein advised Deaver, conducting polls and planning events and visuals (e.g. Reagan's trip to France for the 40th anniversary of D-Day). As The Washington Post reported: "For the White House, Finkelstein is more of an idea man than a pollster, specializing in media events such as the president's "spontaneous" drop-ins on disadvantaged individuals and institutions."

He also worked on gubernatorial races, including Jim Wallwork’s campaign in New Jersey in 1981, and Paul Curran’s campaign in New York in 1982. Both were unsuccessful.

In 1982, Finkelstein client Orrin Hatch sailed to re-election in Utah, while in Florida, banker Connie Mack III won his first campaign for the House. But his efforts on behalf of Democrat-turned-Republican Congressman Eugene Atkinson of Pennsylvania ended in defeat, as did the Congressional campaign in Westchester County of John Fossel, chairman of Oppenheimer Funds.

That year, NCPAC (with Finkelstein as pollster-strategist) was successful in only one targeted race (helping to oust Democrat Howard Cannon in Nevada), failed in several others (e.g. Maryland), and thereafter declined in influence. The pitfalls of running IEs and campaigns at the same time were illustrated when NCPAC was sued for running ads in early 1982 against New York Sen. Daniel Patrick Moynihan—around the same time as Finkelstein was working for GOP Senate candidate Bruce Caputo.

In 1986, a federal court ruled against NCPAC, and The Washington Post editorialized, "Both NCPAC and the Caputo campaign used the same pollster, Arthur Finkelstein. They could hardly be said to be independent unless the Caputo side of Mr. Finkelstein's brain refrained from communicating with the NCPAC side." (Finkelstein himself was not sued or charged; ironically, Caputo's campaign had imploded after revelations he'd lied about serving in the military, and Moynihan was never seriously challenged.) As late as 1987, Finkelstein was doing surveys for NCPAC (e.g. in New Mexico).

In the early 1980s, Finkelstein began working on international polling projects, including for Canada’s National Citizens Coalition and Ontario’s Progressive Conservative Party after their 1985 election loss.

The 1984 election cycle saw him involved in three pitched battles for the Senate, the most heralded being the challenge of Democratic Governor Jim Hunt to Helms in North Carolina. The Ellis-Wrenn-Finkelstein team used the permanent assets of the National Congressional Club to wage a three-year campaign to undermine Hunt, including a groundbreaking opposition-research and advertising effort that redefined the popular governor as a tax-raising national Democrat. Helms won with 52%, in what was then the most expensive Senate race in history. However, this was the last Helms campaign in which Finkelstein was actually involved. Before Helms' 1990 re-election campaign, Finkelstein told the North Carolina team he couldn't work for the Senator any more. According to Carter Wrenn the New Yorker was polite about it, didn't offer a reason and recommended one of his proteges, John McLaughlin, handle the survey and strategy work. At the time, Helms was becoming one of the leading critics of the gay rights movement. "I took it that Arthur wasn't comfortable with Jesse's stand on the social issues," Wrenn said, and chalked it up to Finkelstein's libertarian views.

in November 1984, Finkelstein also found success in New Hampshire, as he aided freshman conservative Sen. Gordon Humphrey in overcoming a tough challenge from long-time Democratic Congressman Norman D'Amours. But in Massachusetts, after winning a contested primary against Elliot Richardson, businessman Ray Shamie lost a close uphill battle to Lt. Gov. John Kerry for the Senate seat vacated by Paul Tsongas. Another client, Congressman Tom Corcoran, failed to dislodge incumbent Charles Percy from the Senate nomination in Illinois, despite tough ads (attributed to Finkelstein) suggesting Percy was personally close to PLO leader Yasser Arafat (Percy ended up being defeated by Democrat Paul Simon).

His Congressional clients in 1984 included three New Yorkers – Joseph DioGuardi (who won election in Westchester County), Robert Quinn (who lost in Nassau County) and Serphin R. Maltese (who lost a close race for Geraldine Ferraro's seat in Queens). He helped guide Bill Cobey to an upset victory for Congress in North Carolina against incumbent Ike Andrews.

In 1985, Finkelstein polled for the gubernatorial campaign of Virginia Attorney General Marshall Coleman, losing the nomination to Wyatt Durrette (who was then defeated by Democrat Gerald Baliles).

Republicans lost their Senate majority in the November 1986 midterm elections. Nevertheless, Finkelstein's leading clients won re-election — Alfonse D'Amato in New York, and Don Nickles in Oklahoma. However, his candidate to succeed John East in North Carolina, David Funderburk, lost his primary, and he fared no better in Ohio, where Congressman Tom Kindness made little headway against incumbent Sen. John Glenn as well as in Illinois, where state legislator Judy Koehler failed to dislodge Senator Alan Dixon. Finkelstein also steered Californian Elton Gallegly to his initial victory for Congress, but failed to push State Sen. Ed Davis to victory in the California U.S. Senate primary.

In 1985–87, Finkelstein was part of the team advising former U.N. Ambassador Jeane Kirkpatrick for a possible campaign for the Presidency. Kirkpatrick ultimately declined to run.

The Florida Senate contest of 1988 — closest in the country that year — was among Finkelstein's signature efforts. Congressman Connie Mack III won a tougher-than-expected primary, but his campaign did not wait for the results of the early-October Democratic runoff. Finkelstein determined (correctly) that Congressman Buddy MacKay would emerge from the bitter face-off, and began running TV and radio ads re-defining MacKay through his liberal voting record, with the tagline, "Hey Buddy, You're a Liberal." MacKay's primary and runoff campaign had focused on ethics — appropriate for defeating Democrat Bill Gunter, but useless against Mack — and he failed to blunt the ideological attack. Still, the "Hey Buddy" ads were unpopular with the press, and 22 of 23 Florida daily newspapers endorsed MacKay.

Mack continued to press the liberal vs. conservative contrast in debates and ads, closing with endorsements by the highly popular Ronald Reagan and George H. W. Bush, plus footage of MacKay endorsing various tax increases. A slight majority of voters casting ballots on Election Day backed MacKay, but an aggressive GOP absentee-voter program had already banked a margin of tens of thousands of votes, and Mack was elected senator by a total of 34,512 votes out of 4 million cast.

Finkelstein also advised Joe Malone in his campaign against Massachusetts Sen. Edward Kennedy; Malone lost with 34%, but gained enough positive recognition that, in 1990, he was elected Treasurer in the overwhelmingly Democratic state. Another client, Joseph DioGuardi, lost his congressional re-election contest in New York, 48% to 50%, to Nita Lowey. But, in another tight contest decided by absentee voters, Denny Smith won re-election to Congress in Oregon.

=== 1989–94: Focus on New York ===
Brooklyn native Finkelstein had long advised local and state party organizations in New York (e.g., the powerful GOP committees of Westchester, Nassau and Suffolk Counties, then dominant in all three suburban areas).

In 1989, he dove into the contentious world of New York City politics. Rudolph Giuliani's initial candidacy for Mayor was met with a primary challenge by cosmetics billionaire Ronald Lauder, backed by Sen. D'Amato and guided by Finkelstein. The Giuliani-D'Amato feud had begun in 1988 over the selection of Rudy's successor as U.S. Attorney for the Southern District of New York; it colored Republican politics in the Empire State for the next several years. In this first skirmish, Lauder's millions of dollars' worth of hard-hitting advertising failed to prevent Giuliani's winning the GOP nomination. (Giuliani later blamed Lauder's primary ads for his narrow loss to David Dinkins that November.)

A year later, in the disastrous 1990 gubernatorial election, GOP nominee Pierre Rinfret nearly finished in third place (behind Conservative Party of New York State upstart Herbert London). D'Amato, and by extension Finkelstein, assumed dominance over the moribund state party apparatus. Long-time Rensselaer County activist William Powers, a staunch D'Amato ally, was named chairman, and began the rebuilding process. (D'Amato allies had started their own state PAC in 1989, the Committee for New York, in order to aid Republicans independent of the decaying party team.)

At this time, the Reaganite Finkelstein was not a fan of the current Administration of George H. W. Bush. In a rare public appearance in February 1991, after the GOP's poor national showing in the November 1990 elections, he reminded a conservative audience that Reagan prospered through unabashed ideological appeals that drew crossover votes from sympathetic Democrats. But Bush and other GOP candidates "kicked that away" in 1990 by raising taxes, sidestepping abortion and other social issues, and soft-pedaling their anti-communism while rooting for Mikhail Gorbachev to succeed. "We are going to have to go back to the things that got us here," Finkelstein said.

Meanwhile, D'Amato faced mounting ethical problems, and these occupied much of Finkelstein's time in 1990 and 1991. Though the New York senator was ultimately cleared by the Senate Ethics Committee in 1991, he was the subject of ceaseless negative news stories and editorials.

When CBS's 60 Minutes ran a highly damaging story on D'Amato, Finkelstein produced a response program that refuted many of its charges and misstatements. All the while, D'Amato's aggressive casework program and advocacy for New York interests was emphasized in paid and earned media. Nevertheless, going into his 1992 re-election campaign, D'Amato was shown in surveys to be a near-certain loser to most prospective challengers. The indictment of his brother, Armand D'Amato, on two dozen counts of mail fraud in March 1992 darkened the clouds further.

When the Democrats nominated Attorney General Robert Abrams in September, Finkelstein's polls showed D'Amato down 25 points, just seven weeks before the election. With the huge lead enjoyed by Democratic presidential nominee Bill Clinton in New York, the Bush-Quayle ticket was a positive drag on D'Amato. As with the Mack-MacKay race in 1988, Finkelstein moved to define Abrams by his liberal positions on issues. Support for a single-payer national health scheme was translated into "a 6% tax on every job in America"—a contention never challenged. His backing for other tax increases was documented and publicized in TV and radio ads, with the tagline, "Bob Abrams: Hopelessly liberal".

The D'Amato campaign was no less bold on the ethics issue, repeating pay-for-play charges made by ex-Rep. Geraldine Ferraro during the Democratic primary, with ads featuring excerpts from the Abrams-Ferraro debate. When news stories late in the campaign revealed the nominee's disallowed business-tax deductions, Finkelstein's closing ad ran: "Bob Abrams never met a tax he didn't like ... except his own." On Election Day 1992, as Bill Clinton was winning New York State by 16 points, D'Amato won re-election by 1.2 points, a margin of 80,794 votes — with a wave of Clinton-D'Amato split-ticket voting in Brooklyn, Queens and Buffalo the deciding factor.

Finkelstein had several other results that day. In North Carolina, he helped the Ellis-Wrenn-Congressional Club team guide businessman and former Democrat Lauch Faircloth to victory over incumbent Sen. Terry Sanford. Don Nickles easily won a third term as senator from Oklahoma. But in Illinois, the candidacy of Rich Williamson failed to defeat Democrat Carol Moseley Braun to replace Sen. Alan Dixon.

D'Amato's comeback win had demonstrated the Republicans' window of opportunity in New York City's outer boroughs, among working-class Catholics and (especially) Jewish voters angered by Democratic leaders' handling of the Crown Heights violence and subsequent incidents.

The senator's ticket-splitting performance had the effect of shielding downticket candidates from the Bush debacle, and Republicans actually made Congressional gains in strong D'Amato areas — e.g., working-class Buffalo (Jack Quinn), and suburban Long Island (Rick Lazio) — while holding the majority in the powerful State Senate, which strengthened the hand of D'Amato, Finkelstein and Powers going into 1993 and 1994.

Giuliani's second Mayoral campaign in 1993 benefited from the resurgent New York GOP. He had made a point of endorsing the Senator for re-election, and D'Amato and Finkelstein did not again back a primary challenger. This time, Giuliani ran a more effective race, riding to victory on a wave of discontent with incumbent David Dinkins, with even stronger turnout among ethnic Catholics and Jewish voters than in 1989, and in the same areas where D'Amato had done well a year earlier.

In New York City in November 1993, Finkelstein and Ronald Lauder also guided to victory a measure limiting the terms of elected city officials. The New York Times called this vote "a terrific defeat for the city's mostly Democratic political establishment, which had fought in court throughout the summer to kill the referendum, only to have the state's highest court order it on the ballot just two weeks [before the election]."

Finkelstein had specialized in federal elections to this point, and it was uncertain how he would adapt to the localized issues and personal style of a gubernatorial contest. Reluctantly at first, and only after considering several alternative candidates, he and D'Amato settled on supporting little-known State Senator George Pataki of Peekskill for Governor in 1994. They guided him through the State Convention in May, and to a smashing 3-to-1 primary victory in September over Nelson Rockefeller's longtime political wheelhorse Richard Rosenbaum.

The main challenge was defining the race against Cuomo. Finkelstein's first ad radiated disappointment and sowed seeds of disbelief: "Desperate candidates do desperate things ... Mario Cuomo could have been senator or President ..." Subsequent spots, often as brief as 10 seconds, highlighted Cuomo-era failures (e.g. snarled traffic and record-high utility rates in Long Island), and especially the litany of tax increases over his 12 years. The persistent tagline: "Mario Cuomo: Too liberal for too long."

Pataki introduced himself in ads first as a gentle reformer, then angry in responding to Cuomo attacks, and finally enthusiastic (in excerpts from rally speeches at campaign's close). Cuomo defended his record and played up D'Amato's sponsorship of Pataki's campaign (to the tune of Paul Simon's "You Can Call Me Al"), but had trouble overcoming the anti-incumbent tide. Pataki had a slight lead in public surveys when, on October 24, Giuliani endorsed Cuomo, with attacks on his fellow Republican quickly becoming a staple on evening news programs. Poll numbers fluctuated wildly, with Finkelstein's own tracking survey showing a Cuomo lead ballooning to 13 points within days. It required a swift response. He elected to attack Giuliani's endorsement as a corrupt deal with Cuomo, the ad using headlines citing suspiciously timed New York State grants to the City to suggest the Governor had used taxpayer money to buy the Mayor's backing. Pataki relentlessly pushed this argument in public appearances.

The pendulum swung back, with negative reaction to Giuliani especially strong Upstate and in the Metro North and Long Island suburbs. (GOP protestors even chased the Mayor's plane on an airport tarmac during a statewide flyaround for Cuomo.) Pataki closed the sale with an energetic tour of the state, appearing alone on a WCBS-TV Election Eve program when Cuomo refused a one-on-one debate. The final result: Pataki defeated Cuomo by 4 points. In an historic Republican landslide year, Mario Cuomo was the most prominent Democrat to fall. As Todd Purdum of The New York Times wrote that November, "For good or ill, Mr. Pataki's campaign [wa]s almost entirely a creation of Mr. Finkelstein."

Delaware provided another win for Finkelstein in November 1994, as longtime Senator Bill Roth coasted to victory for his fifth term, 56% to 44%.

=== 1995–98: NRSC, Netanyahu, "Outed", and New York ===
Following Election Day 1994, D'Amato and Finkelstein were handed new challenges, as the 14-year incumbent was named by his Senate peers as chairman of the National Republican Senatorial Committee (NRSC), one of the four permanent GOP campaign operations in Washington. They had a tough act to follow—Phil Gramm of Texas had just piloted Republicans to a 7-seat gain and recaptured control of the Senate. Now he and D'Amato were responsible for helping to direct Senate campaigns in 33 states simultaneously.

One of their first moves was to break the cycle of hiring parochial-minded Senate aides to manage the sprawling committee; their choice for Executive Director was John Heubusch (later a top executive with Gateway Computers and head of the Ronald Reagan Presidential Foundation). Other key hires were Jo Anne B. Barnhart as Political Director, and Gordon Hensley as Communications Director. Barnhart was a long-time aide and campaigner for Senator William Roth, and later served as Commissioner of the Social Security Administration. All three were singled out by Roll Call newspaper in 1996 as among national "Politics' Fabulous Fifty."

The NRSC faced several challenges beyond their control, many emanating from the two dominant Republicans of 1995-96, House Speaker Newt Gingrich and Senate Majority Leader Bob Dole. The Oklahoma City bombing had given President Bill Clinton an opportunity to marginalize his opponents, and slowed the momentum of the reform-minded Republican Congress.

By late 1995, unrelenting Democratic/press attacks, and his own missteps, had turned Gingrich into a pariah through much of the country (2-to-1 unfav-fav ratio in surveys); meanwhile, Dole was running for President, and allowing ambition to overshadow his Senate work. In mid-1996, Dole resigned from the Senate to campaign full-time, but by then he was behind Clinton to stay, and eventually polled less than 41% nationwide.

D'Amato remained personally devoted to Dole, but Finkelstein and the NRSC team urged Republican Senate candidates to cut loose from unpopular national leaders and carve their own individual profiles on issues. D'Amato remained a champion fundraiser and the committee found new legal ways to deliver assistance to Senate campaigns and local parties. The NRSC paid particular attention to blunting the wave of millionaire political unknowns (e.g., Tom Bruggere in Oregon, Elliott Close in South Carolina) recruited that year by the Democrats. It shored up many endangered incumbents, including Bob Smith (New Hampshire), John Warner (Virginia), 75-year-old Jesse Helms (North Carolina) and 94-year-old Strom Thurmond (South Carolina).

On election night, as Clinton defeated Dole by nearly 9 points and Gingrich's House Republicans lost a net 8 seats, Senate Republicans won open seats in Alabama, Arkansas and Nebraska, while losing South Dakota. In a poor GOP year, the D'Amato–Finkelstein NRSC had gained a net 2 seats (and narrowly missed another gain in the Max Cleland – Guy Millner race in Georgia).

Finkelstein was not a consultant to the Dole Presidential campaign, despite his closeness to several of its top staffers. But, in the election's waning days, Time magazine reporter Erik Pooley detected the New Yorker's influence on strategy, writing:

For Arthur Finkelstein, this week might have been a vindication: Bob Dole finally started labeling Bill Clinton a "spend-and-tax liberal," using a crude but often effective strategy known as "Finkel-think" by some Dole advisers, because the secretive Republican strategist has been deploying it on behalf of his clients for 20 years ... These days, Finkelstein is exercising a kind of remote control. The Senator's latest brain trust is dominated by "Arthur's Boys" ... And Dole is rushing around the country chanting the Finkelstein mantra. "Liberal! Liberal! Liberal!" he cried in St. Louis, Missouri.

His own statewide clients in 1996 showed a mixed record, with Senator Larry Pressler (South Dakota) and ex-Senator Rudy Boschwitz (Minnesota) both losing, albeit in close races. Bob Smith survived with a 49% plurality win. New Jersey Congressman Dick Zimmer was defeated in his Senate bid against Robert Torricelli.

Earlier in 1996, he also helped Benjamin Netanyahu oust Shimon Peres as Prime Minister of Israel in a close upset. According to The Jerusalem Post, "Finkelstein was largely responsible for the strategy that brought Netanyahu victory in the 1996 general elections."

According to the Times of Israel, "Finkelstein was behind the "Peres will divide Jerusalem" slogan that helped Netanyahu overcome Shimon Peres who had been forecast to sweep to power in the wake of the assassination of Yitzhak Rabin the previous November. That election was credited with changing the tone of Israeli campaigns, bringing more American-style, aggressive and negative campaigning to Israel." But his expertise helped in subtler ways as well; biographer Neill Lochery wrote in 2016 that Finkelstein was behind such ideas as dyeing Netanyahu's salt-and-pepper hair gray to give him a more statesmanlike appearance.

Jeff Barak of The Jerusalem Post, a harsh critic of Finkelstein and Netanyahu, called the strategist "the brains behind Netanyahu's first election victory in 1996. Netanyahu's campaign back then, from which he has never wavered, was that you're either for him or an enemy of the people. His campaign slogan at the time, 'Netanyahu is good for the Jews,' encapsulated this. By implication, if you're not for Netanyahu then you're not good for the Jews, and therefore an enemy. And if Netanyahu is good for the Jews, then this also not-so-subtly hints that Netanyahu's bad for the Arabs, regardless of the fact that they are supposedly citizens of equal standing who comprise around 20% of the country's population."

Finkelstein's greatest personal challenge that year came with the August issue of Boston magazine, which revealed his private life as a homosexual; the ostensible excuse for the outing was that several Finkelstein clients had voted against gay-rights measures in Congress, and his work to elect them was therefore inconsistent and/or hypocritical. In September, D'Amato said, "I don't think a person's sexual orientation, his private life — a person's private life should be brought up and I think the question is offensive, it's wrong. He's a wonderful, decent person and whatever his sexual orientation is, that's his business."

Finkelstein's next two years anchored him again in New York, for the simultaneous re-election campaigns of Senator D'Amato and Governor Pataki in 1998. The contests were as different as the candidates themselves, with the calm, earnest Pataki winning high approval ratings and discouraging stronger Democrats from challenging him. New Yorkers' approval of Republican executives was signaled with the landslide re-election of Giuliani as Mayor in November 1997.

Finkelstein crafted a highly positive campaign for Pataki, focusing on fulfillment of promises from 1994 (e.g., tax cuts) and policy innovations (the STAR tax program for seniors) Raising $21 million, Pataki defeated New York City Council President Peter Vallone by 21 percentage points, polling 54.3%, the largest share by a Republican for Governor since Nelson Rockefeller in 1958.

D'Amato was another matter; since his narrow victory in 1992, his profile had grown more partisan Republican in this still-heavily Democratic state. Summoning First Lady Hillary Clinton to testify before his Senate committee in 1995, and aggressive campaigning for Dole in 1996, damaged D'Amato in a state where Bill Clinton crushed the Kansan by nearly 2-to-1 (60% to 31%), doubling his 1992 margin over Bush.

D'Amato's decision to divorce his wife after a long separation and announce his engagement to a young socialite did not help his favorable ratings, while others recalled his mock-Japanese impression of O. J. Simpson case Judge Lance Ito in 1995 (for which he was forced to apologize on the Senate floor).

D'Amato raised a record $26 million for the 1998 campaign, and Finkelstein went to work early shoring up his client's "Senator Pothole" image of close attention to local needs and the problems of individual New Yorkers (as he had done successfully in 1992). State polls showed a swing back to such issues as health care and social concerns, which needed to be addressed. The tagline of these ads: "Al D'Amato Cares, Al D'Amato Makes a Difference, Al D'Amato Gets Things Done."

The Democratic primary was ultimately between Queens politician Geraldine Ferraro and U.S. Representative Charles Schumer of Brooklyn. Finkelstein prepared for both eventualities. When Schumer won by a surprisingly large margin, he immediately began ads that raised questions about the candidate's work ethic. (As Congressman, Schumer had missed an inordinate number of committee meetings.) The unexpected line of attack stymied the Democrat in late September and early October, and despite his weaknesses D'Amato gamely held onto a lead.

All this collapsed in late October, after a remarkable show of hubris and bad judgment at a closed-door meeting with Jewish supporters in Brooklyn. First, D'Amato did a waddling impression of then-obese Democratic U.S. Rep. Jerrold Nadler. Later in the meeting, he referred to Schumer as a "putzhead" (a mangling of the Yiddish vulgarism "putz"). He later denied using this characterization, during questions from reporters (but was swiftly contradicted by his own supporters, present at the meeting, including Ed Koch). Film of the denial was turned into a Schumer TV ad within days.

Finkelstein's tracking survey the night of D'Amato's "putzhead" comment showed the senator leading Schumer by 10 points with two weeks to go. But the meltdown was quick and decisive, especially among Jewish voters, with Schumer's ads relentlessly driving the message of D'Amato's dishonesty and dislikeability. The Democrat's closing tagline was itself a homage to Finkelstein: "D'Amato: Too many lies for too long." Schumer won, 55% to 44%—a 20-point turnaround.

In other races that year, Senator Lauch Faircloth—who had earlier replaced Finkelstein for his 1998 reelection campaign in North Carolina — brought him back into the fold in the closing weeks of the race. (Faircloth ultimately lost a close contest to Democrat John Edwards.)

== Later clients and campaigns, 1999–2017 ==
=== International ===
In the 2000s, Finkelstein spent more time working overseas than in previous decades, with clients in Albania, Austria, Bulgaria, the Czech Republic, Hungary, Kosovo, Ukraine and Azerbaijan (the last, in coordination with George Birnbaum.) He continued to consult in Israeli elections, working again for Benjamin Netanyahu in 1999, Ariel Sharon (whom he helped become Prime Minister in 2001), and finally Avigdor Lieberman and his Yisrael Beytenu party.

=== Florida ===
Having twice steered Connie Mack III to Senate victories in 1988 and 1994, Finkelstein was in demand for the 2000 Florida contest upon Mack's retirement. His candidate was 10-term Congressman Bill McCollum, and he helped clear the Republican field early in anticipation of a tough general election against Insurance Commissioner Bill Nelson. It was a nail-biter with many echoes of the 1988 Senate campaign, but with a different outcome. As enthusiasm among Republican voters faltered in the final days (after revelations of George W. Bush's 1976 DUI conviction), GOP coattails and McCollum's slim lead disappeared, and Nelson was elected, 51% to 46%.

McCollum ran for the other Florida Senate seat on Democrat Bob Graham's retirement in 2004, but succumbed to eventual Senator Mel Martinez after low fundraising allowed the challenger to overcome his early lead. But McCollum was more successful in 2006, when he was the consensus GOP choice for Attorney General, and defeated Democrat Skip Campbell, 53% to 47%, polling well in a poor year for Republicans.

In 2009 and 2010, Finkelstein helmed McCollum's campaign for Florida Governor, where he was the favorite of the state's GOP Establishment. These plans were upended by the surprise candidacy of wealthy businessman Rick Scott, whose bottomless spending that year ($75 million from his personal coffers) led to a furious contest for the nomination. McCollum fought gamely, but lost the bid to Scott, 44% to 46%, who went on to win election to the Statehouse that November against Democrat Alex Sink.

A 2004 open seat in Florida's 14th Congressional District allowed Finkelstein to help create a political dynasty, as he steered State Rep. Connie Mack IV to a narrow victory in a four-way primary, then general-election wins in 2004, 2006, 2008 and 2010.

Finkelstein served as strategist for Mack's Senate campaign in 2012; a late entrant in the primary, the Congressman won the GOP nomination with 58%, but was defeated by incumbent Bill Nelson by a million votes in the Obama re-election year. (Mack IV later became a lobbyist, whose clients included the government of Hungary, whose leader Viktor Orbán was a leading Finkelstein client in the 2010s.)

=== New York ===
Pataki's third gubernatorial campaign, in 2002, provided some fresh challenges to Finkelstein, including a contest for the Conservative Party of New York State nomination, a still-shrinking Republican base, and a strong third-party challenge from millionaire B. Thomas Golisano, running again on the Independence Party line. Finkelstein positioned Pataki as an economic conservative but far more moderate on social and spending issues than in previous campaigns. This shift won the endorsement of influential union leaders such as Dennis Rivera and Randi Weingarten. Pataki enjoyed a 15-point victory, polling 48% to 33% for state Comptroller H. Carl McCall, and 14% for Golisano.

Finkelstein tried to make use of Pataki's likely coattails by helming the campaign of David Cornstein for the state Comptroller slot being vacated by McCall. Cornstein, a successful businessman and Giuliani's appointed chief of Off-Track Betting, brought personal resources and a strong finance team to the table. He was a longtime ally of both the Mayor and Governor, with a City/Long Island base and unusual appeal as a Jewish Republican running as a moderate-conservative. But party regulars instead fell in decisively behind former Upstate Assemblyman John Faso, a onetime legislative leader for the GOP minority, and Cornstein abandoned his run in 2001. (Faso further failed to expand his appeal beyond the limited Republican base, losing with 47% in November 2002; in his subsequent 2006 bid for Governor of New York, Eliot Spitzer crushed him, Faso polling just 29%.) In 2017, Cornstein was named U.S. Ambassador to Hungary.

Back in New York in April 2005, Finkelstein announced the organization of Stop Her Now, a 527 committee dedicated to defeating then-Senator Hillary Clinton in the 2006 New York U.S. Senate race. Clinton sailed to an easy re-election, and the PAC was not a factor in the contest.

In the titanic struggle over new stadium construction on Manhattan's West Side, Finkelstein was hired to defeat the proposal by Cablevision, MSG and its allies; they ultimately prevailed, and the new Yankee Stadium was instead built in the Bronx, next to the old ballfield site, opening in 2009. It was the only time that the Finkelstein firm filed disclosure forms as a lobbyist (the filer was Ronald Finkelstein, not Arthur).

Finkelstein advised former Congressman Rick Lazio during his campaign for the 2010 Republican nomination for New York Governor.: Lazio lost the GOP nomination contest to businessman Carl Paladino.

=== North Carolina ===
Finkelstein continued to partner with Carter Wrenn on Tar Heel State races after the demise of the National Congressional Club. In 2000, former Charlotte mayor (and UNC basketball star) Richard Vinroot sought the Governorship, to succeed the term-limited Democrat Jim Hunt. Vinroot won a contested fight for the GOP nomination, but the drop in Republican-voter enthusiasm in the closing days (noted above in Florida) hurt here as well, and Vinroot was defeated by Mike Easley, 44% to 52%.

In one of Finkelstein's last major races before his death, he worked with Wrenn in 2016 to win a spirited primary fight between two sitting Congressmen – George Holding and Renee Ellmers. Wrenn had helped Ellmers pull one of the shocking House upsets of the 2010 election, but she abandoned the veteran consultant after her swearing-in and allied herself closely with House GOP leaders. In this primary, Wrenn backed Holding (a former US Attorney he'd guided to victory in 2012 and 2014), after a court-ordered redistricting combined the constituencies of the two suburban-Raleigh members. Aided by Wrenn's management and Finkelstein's polling and advice, Holding crushed Ellmers, 53% to 24%, and went on to a 56% re-election in November against Democrat John P. McNeil.

=== Other states and presidential ===
In Delaware, Finkelstein continued as pollster in 2000 to Senator Bill Roth, but the 30-year lawmaker fell to a 56–44% defeat that November to Thomas Carper.

Texas businessman David Dewhurst first approached Finkelstein in 1993 about running for Governor; he advised Dewhurst against challenging George W. Bush, who stormed to victory a year later. In 1998, he shepherded the millionaire to victory for the post of state Land Commissioner, then to two successive wins in 2002 and 2006 for the job of Lieutenant Governor. In 2012, Finkelstein worked against Dewhurst in the U.S. Senate primary, polling for the campaign of former ESPN broadcaster Craig James.

Finkelstein also served as pollster for the 2004 primary challenge by conservative Pennsylvania Congressman Pat Toomey against moderate incumbent Sen. Arlen Specter, pairing with strategist Jon Lerner. Specter averted defeat narrowly only after massive assistance from the NRSC and Bush White House (and then switched parties after the 2008 election); Toomey was elected to Specter's seat in 2010 and 2016.

In 2005, Finkelstein polled for the gubernatorial campaign of Doug Forrester in New Jersey; he was defeated by Jon Corzine.

Connie Mack IV's 2007 marriage to Congresswoman Mary Bono led to Finkelstein's aiding her sharply contested (but successful) California campaign in November 2008, defeating Democrat Julie Bornstein in Obama's triumphant year. Bono finally lost in 2012, after her Riverside County seat was redistricted, falling to Raul Ruiz.

Finkelstein returned to New Hampshire in 2009-10, taking on the insurgent campaign of Bill Binnie for the GOP Senate nomination. Binnie was defeated by former Attorney General Kelly Ayotte, who went on to election that November.

In May 2011, Finkelstein told an audience in Prague that three presidential candidates had asked him to serve as pollster on their campaign for the 2012 Republican nomination, and he had turned all three down. (He further noted that Ron Paul was not one of those three.)

== Campaign style and reviews ==
Finkelstein was known for his hard-edged political campaigns, which often focused on a single message with great repetition. He is credited with helping to make "liberal" a dirty word in the United States during the late 1980s and 1990s through the use of commercial messages such as this, intended to damage the image of Jack Reed:

That's liberal. That's Jack Reed. That's wrong. Call liberal Jack Reed and tell him his record on welfare is just too liberal for you.

While often successful (as with NCPAC's attacks on seemingly moderate Democrats, or the D'Amato and Pataki campaigns in New York), Finkelstein's tactics sometimes backfired – in 1996, his repeated attacks against Minnesota U.S. Senator Paul Wellstone (calling him "Embarrassingly liberal. Decades out of touch.") may have helped galvanize Wellstone's liberal grass-roots base. Republican Sen. Rod Grams eventually condemned Finkelstein's negative ads against Wellstone as excessive; however, his client (former Sen. Rudy Boschwitz) came closer that year than any GOP challenger to defeating a Democratic incumbent.

Finkelstein refused the notion he engaged in negative campaigning, a phrase he said connotes false accusations: "It just means that you speak about the failings of your opponent as opposed to the virtues of your candidate"—a strategy he called "rejectionist voting"—a formula based on slogans that disparaged adversaries.

Time magazine in October 1996 reported the Liberal-branding strategy was dubbed "Finkel-think" by leading Bob Dole advisers, and the presidential nominee was (belatedly) employing it against President Bill Clinton.

Political scientist Darrell M. West, in 1996 said ". . .He uses a sledgehammer in every race ... I've detected five phrases he uses — ultraliberal, superliberal, embarrassingly liberal, foolishly liberal and unbelievably liberal."

Philip Friedman, a Manhattan consultant who got his start working for Finkelstein's frequent Democratic rival David Garth, described the pollster as "the ultimate sort of Dr. Strangelove, who believes you can largely disregard what the politicians are going to say and do, what the newspapers are going to do, and create a simple and clear and often negative message, which, repeated often enough, can bring you to victory".

Republican strategist Roger Ailes, who worked with Finkelstein on numerous races in the 1980s, described "Art" as "a polling guy with creative talents",

John Fossel, chairman of Oppenheimer Funds, characterized him as "basically sort of a mad scientist". Finkelstein polled in Fossel's unsuccessful Republican Congressional campaign in Westchester County in 1982. "We had a knock-down, drag-out over whether busing was an issue in Westchester. His polls told him it was. I said, 'I don't think it is, but if it is, it isn't to me,' and we didn't use it."

Carter Wrenn, who worked on Republican campaigns for 44 years with Finkelstein in North Carolina, called him "one of the most creative people I have ever worked with ... He is brilliant in terms of analyzing polls and numbers. He has a unique combination of an analytical and creative mind ... This guy's a workaholic. He must work 18 hours a day ... If you need him, he comes."

Tom Ellis, cofounder of the National Congressional Club said "Just knock on his head, and he'll give you an idea."

In 1990, Randall Rothenberg of The New York Times documented the rise of political and other ads intended to create controversy (in and of themselves), as well as to persuade. While Roger Ailes was credited by some as pioneering the tactic, "other Washington political hands give credit to Finkelstein, another Republican consultant, who deployed numerous news-generating commercials in his 1982 work for the National Conservative Political Action Committee."

Finkelstein's early style is described in a scholarly account of a Congressional primary race in Arizona, published in 1979 in the "Quarterly Journal of Speech".

Finkelstein gave advice to political candidates or elected officials to perform the "dance of the honest man", a metaphor for responding to "questions about transparency, honesty, or integrity" by imagining oneself as a typical, honest voter.

Britain's The Daily Telegraph credited Finkelstein with using polling data to pinpoint the division of Jerusalem as an issue over which Israelis would reject a deal with the Palestinians, during the 1996 election in Israel. The newspaper attributed Benjamin Netanyahu's victory in part to Finkelstein's "scare-mongering".

== Other businesses ==
Finkelstein's office shared a small building with Diversified Research, a separate but related firm that executes telephone surveys and packages their results for political and business consultants (including some media pollsters). The firm, long based in Irvington, New York, had formerly been located in nearby Mount Kisco.

Finkelstein also had interests in Murphy-Powers Media Inc. (whimsically named for two young campaign-manager proteges), and Multi-Media Services (a media-buying firm helmed for years by Tony Fabrizio).

== "Arthur's Kids" ==
Over four decades, Finkelstein was responsible for the early hiring and training of many successful Republican consultants, operatives and managers—collectively called "Arthur's Kids" or "Arthur's Boys"—including Tony Fabrizio, Alex Castellanos, James Hartman, Craig Shirley, George Birnbaum, Beth Myers, Mitch Bainwol, Ari Fleischer, Carter Wrenn, Kieran Mahoney, Zenia Mucha, Jon Lerner, Rick Reed, Patrick Hillmann, Jim Murphy, the pollster brothers John and Jim McLaughlin, Rob Cole, Ron Wright, and Adam Stoll. Others who worked with Finkelstein and have gone on to have successful independent careers include Frank Luntz, Larry Weitzner, Charles R. Black Jr., Roger Stone, Chris Mottola,John Heubusch, Barney Keller, Gordon Hensley, and Gary Maloney.

== Personal life ==
In 1996, Boston Magazine outed Finkelstein as a homosexual in a feature story. In April 2005, Finkelstein acknowledged that in December 2004, he had married his partner of forty years in a civil ceremony at his home in Massachusetts.

Finkelstein was a self-identified libertarian conservative, and once did polling work for the Free Libertarian Party. In his final years he increasingly distanced himself personally from social conservative elements within the Republican Party while nevertheless still working for many conservative candidates. In a 1979 interview, he denied he was "a hard-core right-winger," but noted there was hardly "a serious conservative over the last 10 years [i.e. 1969-79] whom I haven't been involved with."

Finkelstein died of lung cancer on August 18, 2017, aged 72, in Ipswich, Massachusetts. Survivors included his husband, Donald Curiale, of Ipswich and Fort Lauderdale; two daughters, Jennifer Delgado of Danvers, Mass., Molly Finkelstein of Alpharetta, Ga.; two brothers; and a granddaughter Maryn Baird-Kelly.
