= Heubusch =

Heubusch is a surname. Notable people with the surname include:

- John Heubusch (born 1958), American business executive and author
- Kurt Heubusch (1941–2006), Austrian sprint canoer
