= The Shroud Conspiracy =

2017 novel by John Heubusch

The Shroud Conspiracy: A Novel
- First edition cover
- Author: John Heubusch
- Language: English
- Series: Jon Bondurant #1
- Genre: Thriller
- Publisher: Simon & Schuster
- Publication date: March 14, 2017
- Publication place: United States; United Kingdom
- Media type: Print (hardcover)
- Pages: 402
- ISBN: 978-1-5011-5570-3

The Shroud Conspiracy is a 2017 thriller novel by John Heubusch, focuses on the reactions of science and religion concerning the Shroud of Turin, a Christian relic

The book's sequel, The Second Coming, was published in 2018.

== Plot ==
Dr. Jon Bondurant is a forensic anthropologist and atheist. When the Vatican invites him to lead an investigation into the authenticity of the purported burial cloth of Jesus Christ, he agrees. After a contentious debate, the Vatican allows the examination of one of the sacred relics in order to spite the skeptical Bondurant.

While in the Vatican, Bondurant meets Domenika Josef, a devout Catholic and the Vatican’s media specialist assigned to keep an eye on him. She’s privy to a recently discovered ancient codex with revelations concerning the shroud. However, she is unknowingly part of a plan by forces intent on stealing DNA on the shroud. The consequences of the resulting attempt to clone Jesus is the subject of the sequel.

== Publication ==
The Shroud Conspiracy was published by Simon & Schuster on March 14, 2017.

=== Editions ===
- ISBN 978-1-5011-5570-3 (hardcover, 2017)
