= Stop Her Now =

Stop Her Now was an internet-based 527 organization created by Republican political operative Arthur J. Finkelstein with the stated goal of stopping Hillary Clinton's presidential ambitions by defeating her in the 2006 New York Senate race. The group sought to raise funds primarily through its website.

However, the website garnered little money. Clinton's campaign crushed Jeanine Pirro in the opinion polls leading up to the 2006 senatorial race, by margins of more than 2:1, and the State Republican Party abandoned its attempt to unseat her. Clinton eventually achieved her Senate re-election by a 36 percentage point margin.

After the 2006 election, it was rumored the PAC would change tactics in order to focus on Clinton's presidential ambitions instead, and it was relaunched in November of the same year.

The major donors (62 percent) to this PAC are energy trader T. Boone Pickens, who funded the Swift Boat campaign in 2004 against John Kerry as well as the Progress for America Voter Fund PAC and the Straight Talk America PAC, with homebuilder Bob Perry, investor Harold Clark Simmons, and Richard Collins, a Dallas County, Texas newspaper publisher; totaling over $10 million. Since 1978, Pickens has funneled over $5.5 Million into various PACs.
