= National Congressional Club =

The National Congressional Club (NCC) was a political action committee formed by Tom Ellis in 1973 and controlled by Jesse Helms, who served as a Republican Senator from North Carolina from 1973 to 2003. The NCC was originally established as the Congressional Club of North Carolina to cover Helms's campaign debt for the Senatorial elections of 1973. It was described as a "vast and sophisticated enterprise." As a political fundraiser, Helms had few rivals. The National Congressional Club, had "computerized lists of hundreds of thousands of contributors" and a "state-of-the-art" direct-mail operation that raised millions for Helms and other conservative candidates. Almost seventy percent of its regular contributors were from outside North Carolina.

Helms's "political organization, the Congressional Club, became remarkably successful at raising millions of dollars and in operating a highly sophisticated, media-driven political machine. The Congressional Club also provided a source of national standing and power for Helms." By 1995, Helms's political action committee was the most successful in raising funds in the United States at that time. It offered Helms a freedom from restraints under which most politicians operated. He did not need the Republican Party to raise money nor did he depend on the media to reach voters.

The NCC became known for "what critics called 'attack ads'-television ads that emphasized presumably negative aspects of an opponent's record."
