= Gordon Hensley =

American political consultants

Gordon H. Hensley is a Republican consultant and long-time advisor to senate and presidential campaigns, specializing in communications strategy, speechwriting, and press relations. He is the owner of sm/c/p Inc., based in Alexandria, Virginia, and a partner at Health Media Management Group LLC. In December 2016, his name was advanced by associates of Donald Trump for a senior communications post in the Trump Administration. Instead, Hensley continued his work for health-care clients, until May 2020, when he accepted appointment as a senior public affairs adviser at the US Department of Health & Human Services.

Hensley is also a board member of Headcount.org, a non-partisan, New York City-based voter-registration group, together with the former Obama White House chief of staff Peter Rouse, deputy White House chief of staff Alyssa Mastromonaco and Bob Weir, a founding member of the Grateful Dead.

== Early life and political jobs to 1994 ==
Hensley was born in New York. He graduated from Milton Academy in Massachusetts, and studied at Franklin College (Lugano, Switzerland) and George Washington University. Following an internship at the Republican National Committee and a brief stint with the 1980 Reagan presidential campaign in New Hampshire, Hensley's first job in Washington was as communications director for Congressman Joseph DioGuardi, who represented New York's Westchester County. He left DioGuardi's office in 1987 to work as New Hampshire press secretary for the presidential campaign of Pierre S. DuPont. Following DuPont's defeat in the presidential primaries, Hensley directed speechwriting for the New Jersey Senate candidate Pete Dawkins in 1988, and then worked for the successful nomination campaign of Congressman Jim Courter for the GOP gubernatorial contest in New Jersey, in spring 1989.

In 1990, Hensley worked as chief spokesperson and speechwriter for the businessman Clayton Williams, who won the Republican nomination for Governor of Texas by defeating the former Congressman Kent Hance. The highly negative general election contest resulted in a narrow win by the Democrat Ann Richards. The Houston Chronicle called Hensley one of the "inner circle of strategists [and] media wizards plotting the tactics and shaping the message" for Williams, and reported that Richards herself "blamed him [Hensley] for the negative tone of the campaign."

When Louisiana's Democratic Governor Buddy Roemer switched parties in 1991, Hensley was part of the seasoned Republican team chosen to manage his re-election (which included presidential pollster Robert Teeter). The Baton Rouge columnist Carl Redman said, "Hensley knows how to talk in sound bites that please TV and radio reporters. His turn of a phrase is colorful and oh-so-tempting for the print media." Hensley played "bad cop" to Roemer's "good cop" throughout the contest, Redman said. Roemer referred to Hensley as "The Assassin". Pummeled by negative advertising from an independent-expenditure campaign, Roemer ultimately polled third in the October runoff, surpassed by the eventual winner Edwin Edwards and the former KKK leader David Duke.

Hensley spent all of 1992 as National Director for State Press Operations at Bush-Quayle '92, "winning high marks for his media skills and political savvy", according to the Baltimore Sun. Hensley also ended up running the national surrogate press operation, working with governors, senators and cabinet officials.

Following Bush's defeat, Hensley spent seven months in 1993 working for Rep. Sam Johnson of Texas, followed by another seven months as press secretary for the Senate Republican Conference. In the spring of 1994, Hensley served as consultant and speechwriter for Congresswoman Helen Delich Bentley in her bid for the GOP gubernatorial nomination in Maryland.

Hensley concurrently served as a consultant for Chattanooga businessman Bob Corker, in his first bid for the U.S. Senate. Corker came in second among five Republicans in the GOP primary, with winner Bill Frist eventually defeating incumbent James Sasser. Hensley closed the year as communications consultant to George Pataki, who defeated longtime Governor Mario Cuomo for the governorship of New York, and then traveled to California to aid Assemblyman Jim Brulte in the campaign to secure the Speakership of the California Assembly.

== 1995–96: NRSC ==
In 1995 and 1996, Hensley served as Communications Director for the National Republican Senatorial Committee, chaired by Senator Alfonse D'Amato, acting as media spokesperson and communications strategist for Senate campaigns in 33 states. Hensley worked under Executive Director John Heubusch (later a top executive with Gateway Computers and current head of the Reagan Foundation). Roll Call newspaper in 1996 named Hensley one of national "Politics' Fabulous Fifty."

During his time at the NRSC, Hensley spent three months in Portland, Oregon, working to elect businessman Gordon Smith, and wrote many speeches, including South Carolina Sen. Strom Thurmond's final campaign re-election announcement. The NRSC in this cycle faced several challenges beyond its control, many emanating from the two dominant Republicans of 1995–96, House Speaker Newt Gingrich and Senate Majority Leader Bob Dole. Gingrich was turned by Democrats into a pariah through much of the country (2-to-1 unfav-fav ratio in surveys); Dole frittered away an early lead, resigned from the Senate to campaign full-time, and eventually polled less than 41% nationwide.

Hensley and the NRSC team urged Republican Senate candidates to cut loose from unpopular national leaders and carve their own individual profiles on issues. NRSC Chair Alfonse D'Amato remained a champion fundraiser and the committee found new legal ways to deliver assistance to Senate campaigns and local parties. On Election Night, as Clinton defeated Dole by nearly 9 points and Gingrich's House Republicans lost a net 8 seats, Senate Republicans won open seats in Alabama, Arkansas and Nebraska, while losing South Dakota. In a poor GOP year, the NRSC had gained a net 2 seats (and narrowly missed another gain in the Cleland-Millner race in Georgia). Leading columnist Charlie Cook singled out Hensley and other top NRSC staffers for doing "a superb job" with Senate campaign messaging.

== 1997–present: Consulting firm, campaigns & Headcount.org ==
In 1997, Hensley formed his own firm, Strategic Media Inc. (changed in 2005 to the present sm/c/p Inc., the acronym for Strategic Media, Content & Platforms), to focus on political and corporate communications as well as speechwriting. All of his work since 1997 has been through this firm, much of it for the health-care industry.

That year, Hensley was hired by the National Republican Congressional Committee (NRCC) to help direct the successful special election of Vito Fossella to the Congressional seat representing Staten island, NY, vacated by retiring Rep. Susan Molinari. In 1998, Hensley was hired by the New York State Republican Committee to aid the entire GOP ticket, including Pataki, D'Amato and Attorney General Dennis Vacco. Other Hensley political clients included Sen. Paul Coverdell of Georgia, and the independent Republican Leadership Council, chaired by New York financier and senior Trump fundraiser Lewis M. Eisenberg.

Hensley's non-political clients have included the City of New York, American Health Care Association, Edelman Worldwide, the Texas Health Care Association, the Louisiana Nursing Home Association, the Pennsylvania Health Care Association, the Alliance for Quality Nursing Home Care, the Senior Care Pharmacy Coalition, and the American Forest and Paper Association.

Hensley became a board member of the nonpartisan Headcount.org in 2012.

In 2015, Hensley worked on the campaign of Gov. Scott Walker for President, collaborating on his announcement speech and several policy rollouts. His work was praised by campaign manager Rick Wiley: "Hensley did a great job collaborating on Gov. Walker's speech and policy statements. His eye for policy detail, language, nuance and ability to meet tight deadlines is outstanding." Walker suspended his presidential campaign in September 2015.

== Trump era ==
After his work for Walker, Hensley was promoted by associates of Donald Trump, including Roger Stone, for a senior communications post in the new Administration in December 2016. He began work for the Administration as an HHS Public Affairs Advisor in May 2020.

In July 2017, POLITICO reported that former Trump political aide Michael Caputo had hired Hensley "as he heads to Capitol Hill to testify before the House of Representatives Intelligence Committee. . . .Gordon Hensley, who was the top spokesman for the National Republican Senatorial Committee when former U.S. senator Al D'Amato was its chair, will be providing media consulting. Caputo, who once worked as a consultant to Russian president Boris Yeltsin, has said he was not involved in any communications between the Trump campaign and contacts in Russia. The committee is examining ties between Russia and the Trump campaign."

In August 2017, Hensley was quoted in US News & World Report on Republican politicians' reaction to the violent incidents in Charlottesville:

It's an unwelcome snake pit out there for GOP members working their states over summer recess, as many are doing. . . And it's all wasted time.
