= George Birnbaum =

American political consultant

George E. Birnbaum
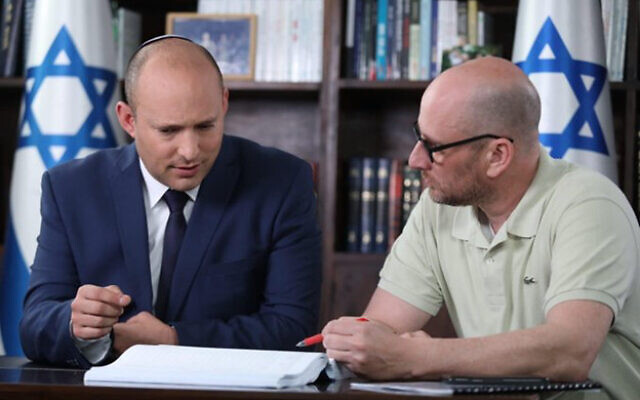
- George Birnbaum with Prime Minister Naftali Bennett
- Born: January 1, 1970 (age 56); Los Angeles, California, US
- Occupation: Political consultant

George Eli Birnbaum (born 1970) is an American-Israeli political, public relations and crisis communications consultant. He was born in Los Angeles, California and raised in Atlanta, Georgia. He worked on the United States congressional and senatorial races. In 1998, he moved to Israel to work as a consultant to Prime Minister Benjamin Netanyahu, became his chief of staff, and afterwards formed a partnership with political consultant Arthur Finkelstein.

== Early life ==
George Birnbaum was born in Los Angeles to Jewish immigrant parents. His father was an Auschwitz survivor and three of his grandparents were Holocaust survivors. When Birnbaum was four his family moved to Atlanta, where he attended elementary and high school. He attended the Florida Institute of Technology where he earned a bachelor's degree in Space Sciences.

== Career ==
Birnbaum took his first paid position in a political campaign in 1992, signing onto Ohio Republican Congressman Bob McEwen’s reelection campaign. In the years following, he worked on campaigns in North Carolina, Florida and Virginia.

During the 1996 cycle, Birnbaum served as the deputy political director and director of survey research under National Republican Senatorial Committee Chairman Alfonse D'Amato. Birnbaum managed Charlie Crist’s 1998 unsuccessful campaign against incumbent Senator Bob Graham in Florida.

After the 1998 cycle, Birnbaum consulted for Israeli Prime Minister Benjamin Netanyahu’s campaign. Birnbaum served as Netanyahu's chief of staff, a position he held for a year and a half.

In 2003, Birnbaum went into partnership with American conservative political consultant Arthur Finkelstein. In 2008, he worked for the campaign of Nir Barkat for mayor of Jerusalem.

In 2010, Birnbaum helped with the campaign of Prime Minister Petr Nečas in the Czech Republic. Previous to the success in the Czech Republic, Birnbaum worked with Finkelstein on the successful elections for the Chancellor of Austria Alfred Gusenbauer, the President of Serbia Boris Tadic as well as the Prime Ministers in Romania Călin Popescu-Tăriceanu and Bulgaria Sergey Stanishev. He was project manager responsible for 2010 Viktor Orbán campaign.

In 2013, Birnbaum and Finkelstein conducted the first ever exit poll for presidential elections in Azerbaijan followed by helping oversee the Constitutional referendum in Azerbaijan in 2016 and another national exit survey in 2020.

Also in 2013, he incorporated Majoritas USA, LLC as the American division of Romanian political technology and data agency Majoritas. The agency was founded in 2008 by entrepreneur Lucian Despoiu. Previous international political clients include Hungary's Viktor Orbán, Indonesia's Joko Widodo, Bulgaria's Sergei Stanishev, Sri Lanka's Maithripala Sirisena, and Ghana's John Mahama.

In 2015, US presidential candidate Ben Carson asked Birnbaum to serve as his chief policy advisor for Israel and the Middle East during the 2016 primaries.

In July 2017, Birnbaum became a partner at Avenue Strategies, a government affairs and political consulting firm based in Washington, D.C.

Birnbaum has been active in Israel, continuing to help Avigdor Lieberman and his Yisrael Beiteinu political party in national elections in Israel.

In 2019, Birnbaum became a managing director for Mercury Public Affairs.

In the 2020 Kyiv local election Birnbaum worked for incumbent Mayor Vitali Klitschko and helped Klitscho win an unprecedented first round re-election with polling data, strategic communications and online ads .

During March 2021 Israeli legislative election Birnbaum worked for Naftali Bennett and was responsible for helping Naftali Bennett become one of leading decision makers in forming the next Israeli government according to sources close to Bennett

In 2023, the BBC called George Birnbaum “One of the most influential people in the world you never head of”.

After the October 7 attacks conducted by Hamas in Israel, Birnbaum's expertise was sought out to comment on the events and likely actions of the Israeli government by numerous news outlets worldwide.

Some the campaigns Oracle Advisory Group worked on recently included the 2024 Azerbaijan Presidential Elections.

In February 2026, Birnbaum returned to advise Naftali Bennett in the 2026 Israeli legislative election when Bennet was polling in the low 20s

== Hungarian campaign against financier George Soros ==
In January 2019, several Swiss newspapers published an article called "Der böse Jude" ("The Evil Jew") by The Magazin reporter Hannes Grassegger, about the origins of the world-wide campaign against Hungarian-born financier George Soros. A week later it was published in English as "The Unbelievable Story Of The Plot Against George Soros". In it, Grassegger draws on an interview with Birnbaum in which he describes how Soros was turned into a pariah in Hungary and a number of other countries due to efforts conceived by Arthur Finkelstein and himself. The article quotes Birnbaum saying "Soros was the perfect enemy... It was so obvious." Ahead of the 2014 Hungarian election, several right-leaning Hungarian newspapers published articles alleging a Soros-led international conspiracy against Hungary. Shortly afterward, the Hungarian authorities took legal action against the environmental NGO Ökotárs, claiming it was Soros-controlled. Although nothing tangible against the organisation was found, this helped to cement the impression in Hungary that Soros was controlling NGOs and meddling in domestic Hungarian affairs.

From 2015, the campaign against Soros intensified, culminating in a billboard campaign by the Hungarian government against Soros and the Open Society Foundations funded by him. In 2018, both the foundation and the Soros-funded Central European University decided that they would leave Hungary and move their offices to Berlin and Vienna respectively.
