= John Heubusch =

American executive and author

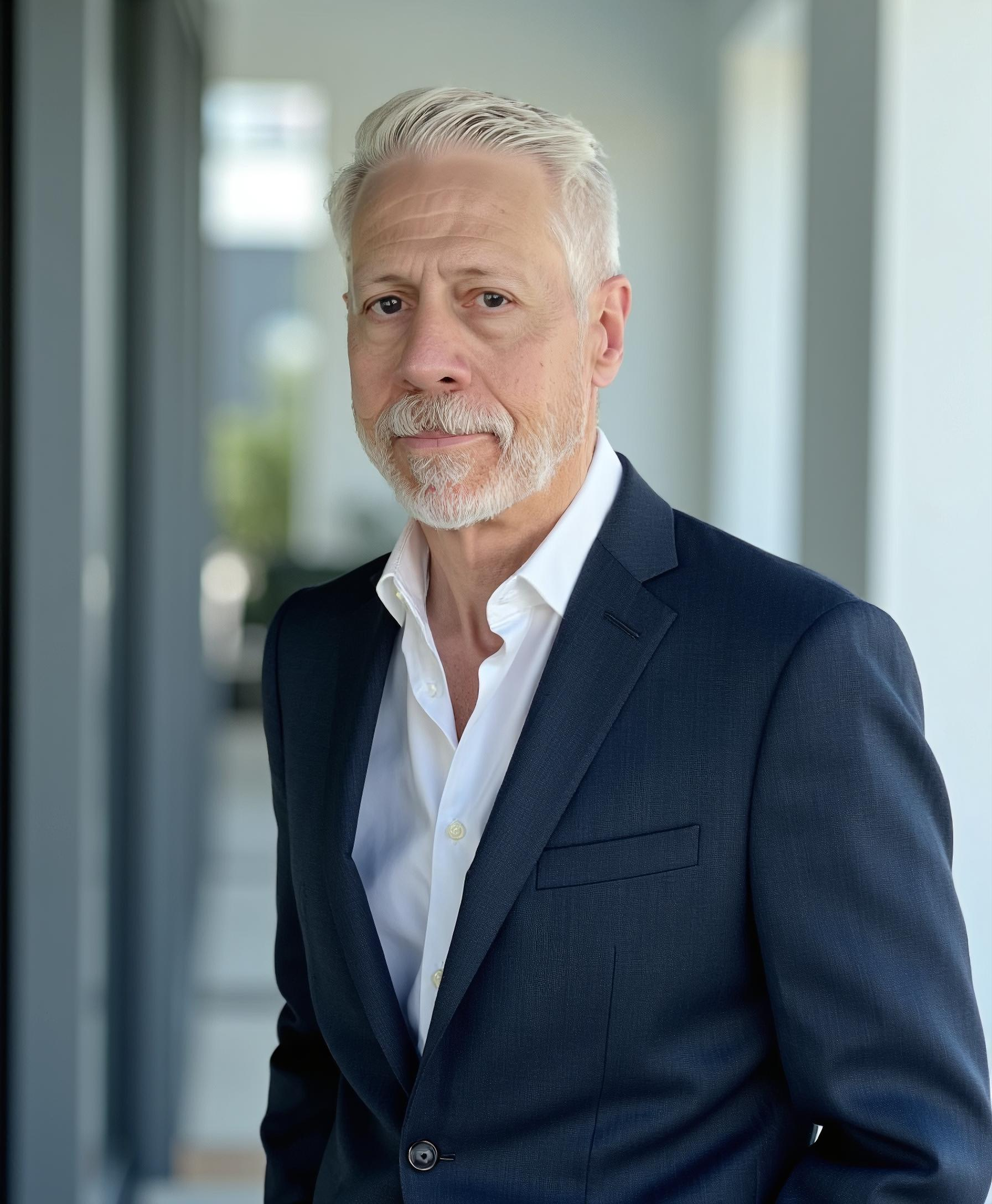
Heubusch at his home in California, March 2025

John Dwyer Heubusch (/ˈhaɪbʊʃ/ HY-buush; born 1958) is an American political and private-sector executive and author, best known for his previous work directing the Ronald Reagan Presidential Foundation and Institute in Simi Valley, California, overseeing the legacy of the 40th President of the United States. The Reagan Foundation funds the permanent Reagan Museum and the activities of the Reagan Presidential Library, as well as the Reagan Institute located in Washington, D.C.

Heubusch has worked as a Pentagon analyst, staffer on Capitol Hill and at the Department of Labor, the head of a major national Republican campaign committee, and a Fortune 500 executive.

== Early life ==
Heubusch was born in Washington DC, grew up in McLean, Virginia, and attended Bishop Denis J. O’Connell high school in Northern Virginia, before graduating from Virginia Tech in 1980 with a B.A. degree in English and political science. He later earned an M.A. in National Security Studies from Georgetown University. Heubusch began his career in 1980 as a research analyst for the Department of the Air Force.

== Congressional aide, military reform, and Executive Branch ==
He moved to Capitol Hill in 1981, landing a job as a legislative aide to Republican Congressman Denny Smith of Oregon. Eventually, Heubusch was named as Smith's chief of staff, while also serving as a House Budget Committee staffer, with a focus on national security. Rep. Smith, a conservative former fighter pilot, was keen on rooting out Pentagon waste and ensuring the safety and effectiveness of defense equipment and systems. Concerned about the poor quality of weapons testing to ensure combat readiness, Smith and Heubusch, who had been named staff director of the Military Reform Caucus, were instrumental in creating the creating the Department of Defense Office of Operational Test and Evaluation (OT&E) in 1983 as part of the Defense Authorization bill. The idea was to create an independent office within the Pentagon that would act as a testing watchdog; despite some good work over the years, OT&E later became part of the cover-up of some poorly designed weapons systems.

Their efforts led to:

- The eventual abandonment of the Sergeant York (DIVAD) air-defense system. OT&E conducted tests on the self-propelled anti-aircraft gun in 1984 and 1985, after the Congressman had blasted the York and called for a performance review, and the results were abysmal. The director of OT&E reported the DIVAD was "not operationally effective," and shortly thereafter, Defense Secretary Caspar Weinberger canceled the program after only 50 had been built. Heubusch later called DIVAD "one of the lemons of the 1980s."
- The re-armoring and retrofitting of the Bradley Fighting Vehicle by the Army. This followed the revelation of data in 1985 that, according to Heubusch at the time, showed that weapon impacts "caused problems with ammunition fires and explosions more serious than what the Army has let on." In 1986, Heubusch and Smith also protested the Bradley's failure to ford streams without taking on massive amounts of water and sinking; "The Bradley doesn't swim worth a damn and the Army knows it," Heubusch told reporters. Eventually, the Army was forced to redesign the vehicle to improve its safety and better protect the lives of its occupants.
- Investigation of the Aegis air-defense system for US Navy vessels. In 1984, Smith ridiculed Navy testing of the Aegis system, saying it was conducted in secrecy, that the testing was too easy and that it produced inaccurate results. In 1988, a Navy ship in the Persian Gulf using Aegis shot down a 177-foot-long Iranian airliner (because it couldn't distinguish it from a 62-foot-long fighter), and 290 passengers were killed. Heubusch revealed that a General Accounting Office report on Aegis testing, made public in July 1988, confirmed Smith's contention that the Navy "essentially rigged the tests to prove it was easy for the ship to do what they said it would do."

The Washington Monthly magazine looked backed in 1993 at the individuals who had contributed most to cleaning up the Pentagon during the Reagan era. "Many people, including a larger contingent of active-duty officers than might be guessed, played important roles in the military reform movement . . ." 17 men and women are named, among them Gary Hart and journalist James Fallows—and they include Smith and Heubusch.

In 1989, Heubusch left Capitol Hill to work for Elizabeth Dole, named as Secretary of Labor under new President George H. W. Bush. Heubusch became Dole's Chief of Staff. When Dole left the Labor Department to head the American Red Cross in 1991, Heubusch moved with her and became vice president of communications.

== Executive Director of NRSC, 1995-96 ==
Following the Republican landslide of 1994, Senator Alfonse D'Amato was named head of the National Republican Senatorial Committee (NRSC), one of the four permanent GOP campaign operations in Washington, responsible for maintaining the new GOP majority. Instead of the parochial practice (common then and now) of naming one of his own staffers to manage the sprawling 200-person operation, D'Amato and his chief strategist, Arthur Finkelstein, sought to professionalize the committee's operations. After an intensive search process, they named Heubusch as executive director. Other key hires included Jo Anne B. Barnhart as Political Director, and Gordon Hensley as Communications Director. (Barnhart was a long-time aide and campaigner for Sen. William Roth, and later served as Commissioner of the Social Security Administration.)

Sen. Phil Gramm of Texas had just piloted Republicans to a 7-seat gain and recaptured control of the Senate. The Bob Packwood sex-harassment scandal led to a costly special election, lost narrowly by GOP candidate Gordon Smith. The NRSC faced several challenges beyond their control, many emanating from the two dominant Republicans of 1995–96 that forced a government shutdown, House Speaker Newt Gingrich and Senate Majority Leader Bob Dole. The Oklahoma City bombing in April 1995 gave Bill Clinton an opportunity to marginalize his opponents, and slowed the momentum of the reform-minded Republican Congress. By late 1995, unrelenting Democratic and press attacks had turned Gingrich into a pariah through much of the country (2-to-1 unfav-fav ratio in surveys); meanwhile, Dole was running for president. In mid-1996, Dole resigned from the Senate to campaign full-time, but by then he was behind Clinton to stay, and eventually polled less than 41% nationwide.

D'Amato remained personally devoted to Bob Dole. Heubusch and the NRSC team urged Republican Senate candidates to carve out their own individual profiles on issues. The NRSC paid particular attention to blunting the wave of millionaire political unknowns (e.g., Tom Bruggere in Oregon, Mark Warner in Virginia, Elliott Close in South Carolina) recruited that year by Senator Bob Kerrey for the Democrats. It also shored up many endangered incumbents, including Bob Smith (New Hampshire), John Warner (Virginia), 75-year-old Jesse Helms and 94-year-old Strom Thurmond.

Heubusch was also quick to exploit a June 1996 ruling by the US Supreme Court in a Colorado case, that allowed political parties to spend unlimited sums in campaigns, as long as the spending remained independent of candidates. Heubusch immediately set up an independent arm of the NRSC to coordinate such expenditures. There was aggressive independent spending in 14 Senate races "and we won nine of them", Heubusch later told the The Washington Post.

On Election Night, as Clinton defeated Dole by nearly nine points and Gingrich's House Republicans lost a net 8 seats, Republicans won open Democratic Senate seats in Alabama, Arkansas and Nebraska, while a GOP incumbent (Senator Larry Pressler) lost South Dakota. In a poor year for most Republicans, the NRSC under Heubusch had gained a net two seats, for a postwar GOP record total of 55 (and narrowly missed another gain in the Cleland-Millner race in Georgia). Heubusch, Barnhart and Hensley were later singled out by Roll Call newspaper in 1996 as among national "Politics' Fabulous Fifty."

== Executive for Gateway Computers and the Waitt Foundation ==
In 1997, Heubusch was hired by Gateway Computers, a South Dakota–based computer and electronics manufacturer, as vice president for governmental affairs, creating and heading their DC office. He was a registered lobbyist from 1997 to 1999, and lobbied against taxes on internet purchases.

By 2000, Heubusch had left Washington for Gateway's new headquarters in San Diego, and became Chief of Staff, answering directly to company founder Ted Waitt., and later (in addition to Chief of Staff) became the company's Chief Administrative Officer (CAO), overseeing strategy, human resources, facilities worldwide communications and government affairs. Gateway struggled after the dot-com bust. By April 1, 2004, Gateway had announced that it would shut down its 188 remaining Gateway Country Stores. In March 2004, with the purchase of eMachines, Gateway management again changed, and Heubusch left his day-to-day executive duties to become President of the Waitt Family Foundation and the Waitt Institute.

During his Gateway sojourn, Heubusch kept his hand in Republican politics, serving as an adviser to Elizabeth Dole's brief campaign for president in 1999, on the National Finance Committee in 2007 for John McCain's presidential campaign, and on the Republican National Committee's Victory 2008 Finance Committee.

Heubusch left Waitt at the end of 2007 to serve briefly as CEO of Brahma Holdings, a start-up that allowed major insurance carriers to reduce their payouts for medical procedures dramatically by detecting fraud in big highly complicated cases. But his time there would be brief.

== Ronald Reagan Foundation and Library ==
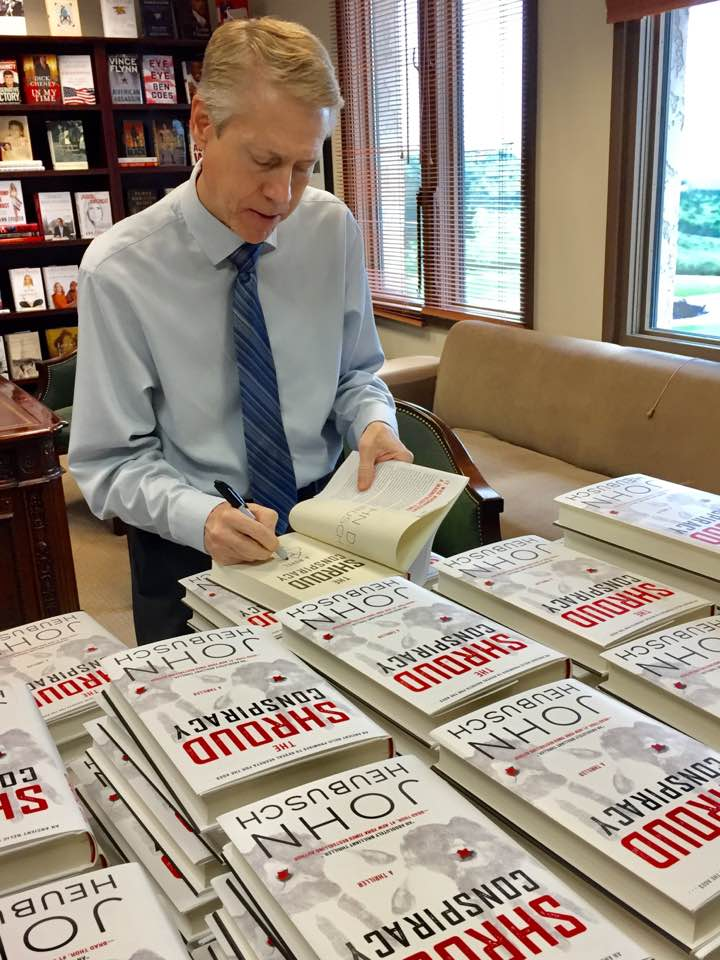
Heubusch at a book signing in 2017

In March 2009, Heubusch was selected by Nancy Reagan and the Board of Trustees of the Ronald Reagan Presidential Foundation and Institute to serve as its executive director. In an interview immediately thereafter, he announced that the Reagan Foundation is "about to rescue the cause of Reaganism from the jaws of Obamaism."

The Reagan Foundation board announced plans to help raise a $100-million endowment, centered on a celebration of the centennial of Reagan's birthday in 2011. This would include $10 million to renovate the Library itself (in Simi Valley, California).

The kickoff event was a 20th-anniversary celebration and conference on the 1989 fall of the Berlin Wall. Obama signed legislation creating the Reagan Centennial Commission, to celebrate the late President's centenary in 2011, but the bill provided no funding -- "which is the way Ronald Reagan would have had it," Heubusch insisted, as he plumbed hard for private donations. The frenzied fundraising and activities led one writer to suggest that "Ronald Reagan is fast becoming the Elvis of the political world." By February 2011, the goal Heubusch had set two years earlier was achieved -- $100 million raised.

The centennial's theme, agreed on by foundation officials and a bipartisan commission created by Congress, is "Ronald Reagan: Inspired Freedom, Changed the World"- a reference not just to his presiding over the end of the Cold War, Heubusch said, but also to "freedom from high taxes, high federal spending and useless regulations . . . It’s relevant in today’s debate, as people try to divine a way out of the economic mess we’re in."

The Reagan Library is the most attended of the 14 presidential libraries—in 2011, and surpassed only once in 2014 by the then-new George W. Bush Museum in Dallas. Today, the Reagan Foundation has nearly $400 million in assets, and an additional $125 million in the form of legacy gifts.

In 2015, Heubusch and Ed Meese, who served as Counselor to the President (1981–1985) and Attorney General (1985–1988), penned a joint op-ed to detail numerous inaccuracies in Killing Reagan, a best-selling book by Bill O'Reilly, saying, "We believe that Killing Reagan does a real disservice to our 40th president and to history itself."

In late 2021, after the Reagan Foundation and Institute reported it had reached historic highs in its endowment ($250 million) and its net assets ($405 million), Heubusch announced his decision to retire. https://www.msn.com/en-us/news/politics/reagan-is-america-s-favorite-and-here-s-why/ar-AARr9tr

On April 7, 2023, Heubusch was sanctioned by the Chinese government after Taiwanese President Tsai Ing-wen gave a speech at the Ronald Reagan Presidential Foundation.

== Author ==
In March 2017, Simon & Schuster (through its Howard imprint) published Heubusch's debut novel, The Shroud Conspiracy, a religious thriller concerning the turmoil after a forensic anthropologist discovers the Shroud of Turin – believed by many Christians to have been the burial cloth of Jesus Christ – is real. Steve Forbes, writing in Forbes, called it "a spectacular thriller." Publishers Weekly noted "Heubusch’s thought-provoking conceit" and "interesting premise," but criticized his "dense exposition and clunky characterization." The book rose to rank as Amazon's No. 1 best-selling hardback in three categories.

Heubusch's second novel, The Second Coming, was published in 2018.

== Personal life ==
In May 2013, Heubusch was diagnosed with stage 4 esophageal cancer. Given six months to live, he underwent intensive chemotherapy, radiation treatments, a complicated surgery and immunotherapy treatments over a period of five years. He is presently cancer free. Heubusch and his wife, Marcella, live in the San Fernando Valley with their two children, Max and Jordana Heubusch. Heubusch has a son, Brock, by his first marriage to Miriam MacPherson of San Diego, California.
