= Thomas F. Ellis =

American lawyer and conservative activist

Thomas F. Ellis (10 August 1920 – 12 July 2018) was an American lawyer and political activist involved in numerous conservative causes. His network of interests was described as "a multimillion dollar political empire of corporations, foundations, political action committees and ad hoc groups" active in the 1980s and developed by Ellis, Harry Weyher, Marion Parrott, Carter Wrenn and Jesse Helms.

Ellis, of Raleigh, North Carolina, was the "backroom architect" of Senator Jesse Helms "rise to political power" as head of Helms' 1972 Republican primary campaign, but F. Clifton White, a widely respected professional campaign manager, was brought in to direct the general election campaign, providing Helms a comfortable upset victory over the favored Democrat, Congressman Nick Galifianakis. In 1973, Ellis formed a political action committee, the Congressional Club of North Carolina, later called the National Congressional Club (NCC) to cover Helms' campaign debt for the Senatorial elections of 1973. The NCC, which was controlled by Senator Helms, who served as a Republican Senator from North Carolina from 1973 to 2003, became remarkably successful at raising millions of dollars and in operating a highly sophisticated, media-driven political machine. The Congressional Club also provided a source of national standing and power for Helms." Bu 1995, the NCC was the most successful in raising funds in the United States at that time. It offered Helm's a freedom from restraints under which most politicians operated. He did not need the Republican Party to raise money nor did he depend on the media to reach voters.

The NCC became known for "what critics called 'attack ads'-television ads that emphasized presumably negative aspects of an opponent's record."

Ellis was an important backer of Ronald Reagan in his 1976 Presidential campaign. Ellis succeeded Tim LaHaye in 1982 as president of the Council for National Policy. He was also chair of the National Congressional Club; principal stock-holder and a board member of the tax-exempt, non-profit Educational Support Foundation that in turn owns Jefferson Marketing. He appointed the officers and directors of Jefferson Marketing; was a co-founder of Fairness in Media, and chairman of the Coalition for Freedom, a tax-exempt foundation whose goal is to finance conservative-oriented television programs.

Because of the arrangements between the National Congressional Club, the Educational Support Foundation, and Jefferson Marketing, in 1986 he and Carter Wrenn were fined $10,000 each for violating federal election laws.

He was also a director of the Pioneer Fund.

He died on 12 July 2018 at the age of 97.

== FIM vs CBS ==
On November 13, 1984, three lawyers from North Carolina - NCC Chairman Ellis, R. E. Carter Wrenn, NCC executive director, and James Palmer Cain, all political allies of Helms - formed an adhoc committee called Fairness in Media (FIM). In a 1985 article published in The Washington Post, journalists Thomas B. Edsall and David A. Vise did an in-depth review of the controversial attack on CBS conceived by Ellis "as a way to capitalize on President Reagan's landslide victory and on Helms' come-from-behind drive to win a third term in the Senate." Conservatives at the time, held a "deep, long-standing animosity" towards mainstream media. Helms had wanted to expand his activities into the corporate takeover of major media outlets, such as a network or large-circulation newspaper major media outlets. On January 10, 1985, Fairness in Media "filed papers with the SEC indicating it would encourage conservatives to buy CBS stock." Helms signature was on a million letters that the FIM sent to conservatives "asking them each to purchase at least 20 shares of CBS stock."
