= Elizabeth Holtzman =

American politician (born 1941)

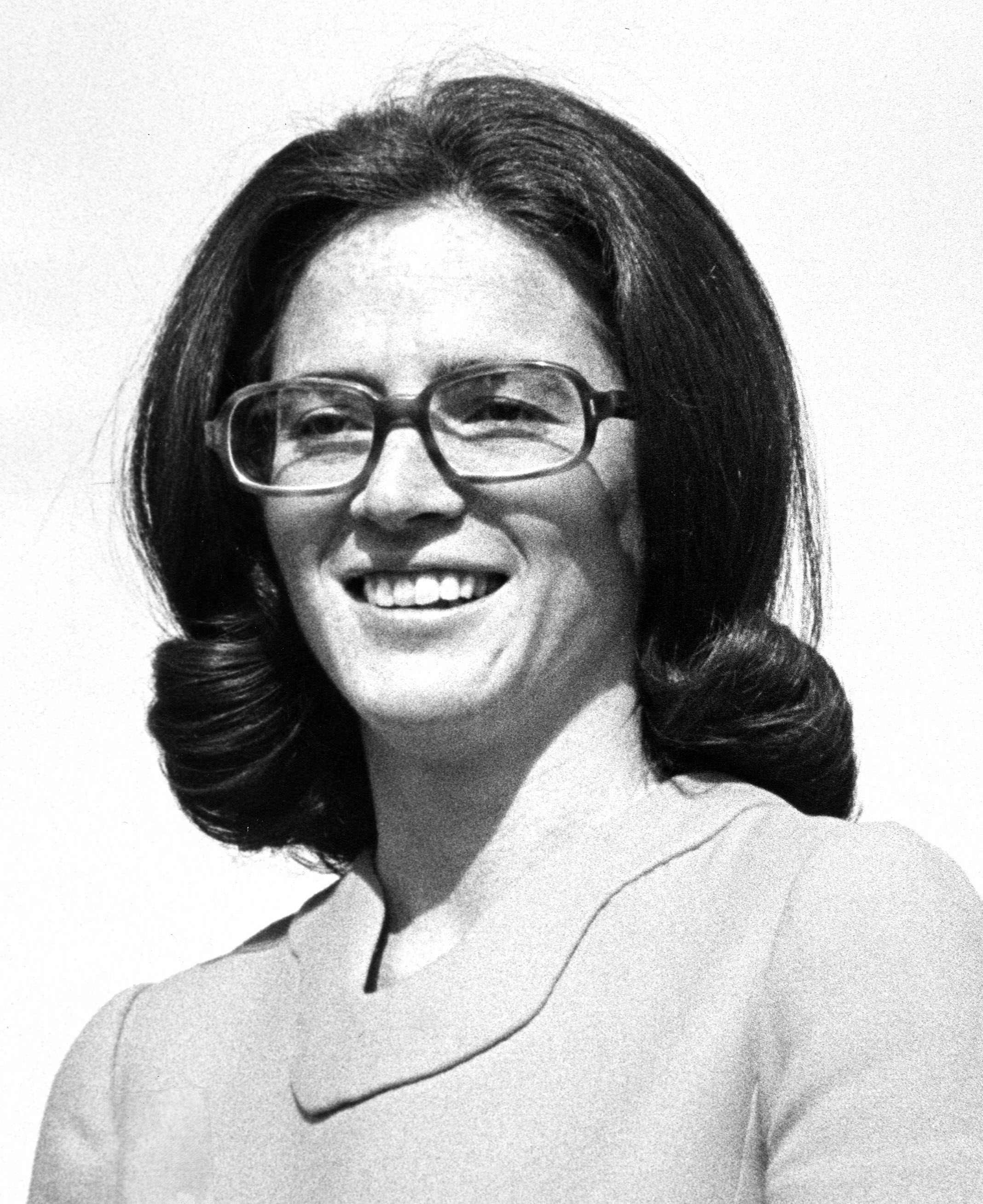
- Holtzman in the 1970s

40th Comptroller of New York City
- In office January 1, 1990 – December 31, 1993
- Mayor: David Dinkins
- Preceded by: Harrison Goldin
- Succeeded by: Alan Hevesi

District Attorney of Kings County
- In office January 1, 1982 – December 31, 1989
- Preceded by: Eugene Gold
- Succeeded by: Charles J. Hynes

Member of the U.S. House of Representatives from New York's 16th district
- In office January 3, 1973 – January 3, 1981
- Preceded by: Emanuel Celler (redistricted)
- Succeeded by: Chuck Schumer

Personal details
- Born: August 11, 1941 (age 85) New York City, New York, U.S.
- Party: Democratic
- Education: Harvard University (BA, JD)

Elizabeth Holtzman (born August 11, 1941) is an American attorney and politician who served in the United States House of Representatives from New York's 16th congressional district as a member of the Democratic Party from 1973 to 1981. She then served as district attorney of Kings County from 1982 to 1989, and as the 40th comptroller of New York City from 1990 to 1993.

Holtzman ran unsuccessfully for the Democratic nomination in New York's 10th congressional district in the 2022 election.

== Early life and education ==
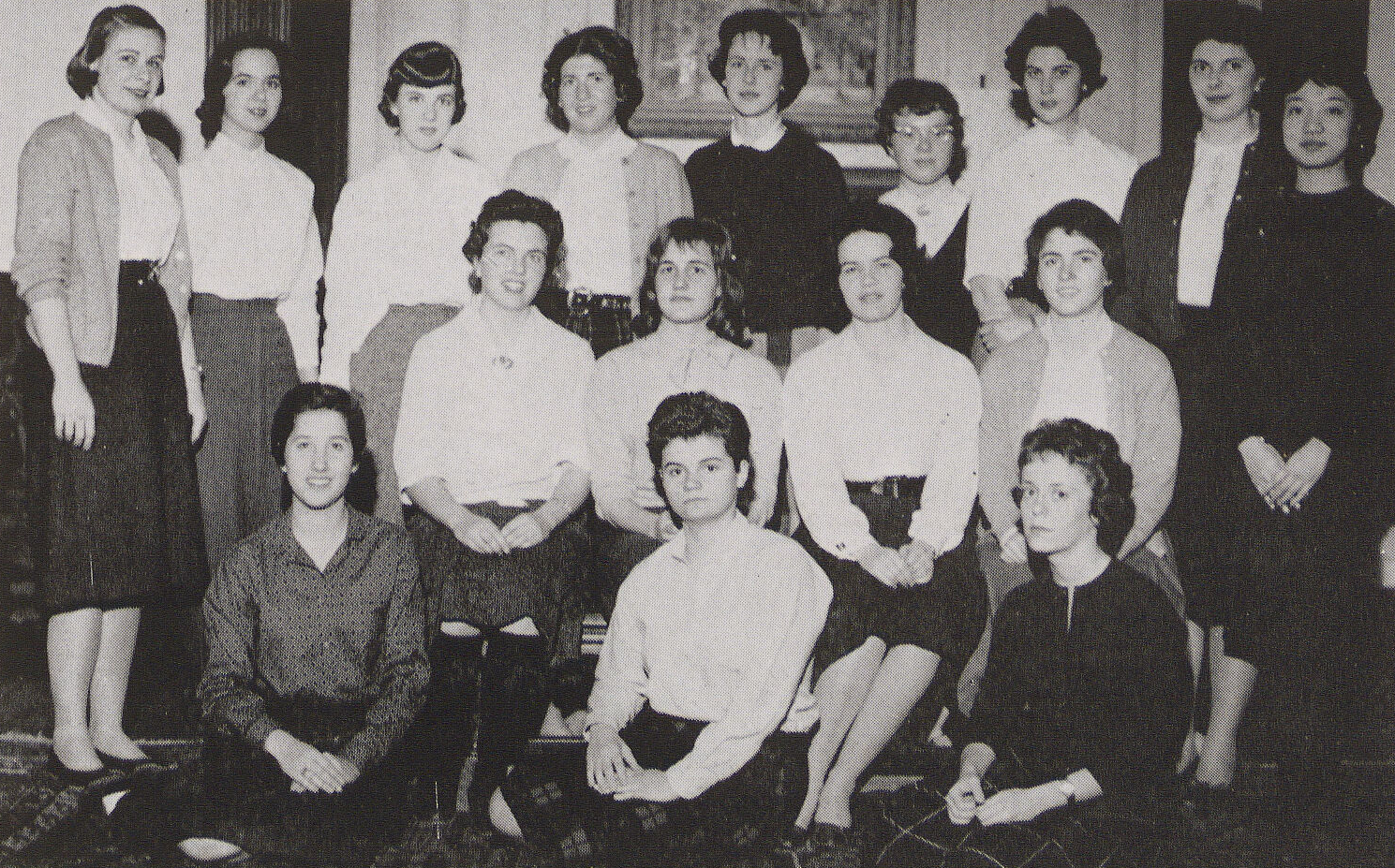
Holtzman (middle row, far right) with other members of the sophomore class committee at Radcliffe College, 1960

Elizabeth Holtzman was born alongside her twin brother in Brooklyn, New York, on August 11, 1941, to Russian immigrants Sidney Holtzman, a lawyer, and Filia Ravitz, who had a doctorate from Columbia University and later headed the Russia department at Hunter College. Her family is Jewish, and she attended Hebrew school.

Holtzman attended the Ethical Culture Fieldston School and Abraham Lincoln High School. She was elected vice president of the student government in 1958, while her brother was its president. Holtzman graduated magna cum laude from Radcliffe College in 1961, where she majored in American history and literature, and from Harvard Law School in 1965. At Harvard Law School she was one of 15 women in the 500 students in her class and was a member of Phi Beta Kappa.

== Legal and education ==
While at Harvard Holtzman joined the Student Nonviolent Coordinating Committee. She worked on civil rights cases in Alabama and Georgia and for the NAACP Legal Defense and Educational Fund. During her time in Georgia she worked as a law clerk for Chevene Bowers King. After being admitted to the New York State Bar Association she worked for Paul, Weiss, Rifkind, Wharton & Garrison starting in 1970, before leaving to run for office in 1972. She was elected to the Harvard Board of Overseers in 1976, and worked at New York University School of Law from 1981 to 1982. New York University had her as a visiting scholar in 1981.

In 1984, a delegation, including Holtzman, went to Paraguay to search for Josef Mengele. President Bill Clinton appointed her to the Nazi War Crimes and Japanese Imperial Government Records Interagency Working Group. In 2013, Secretary of Defense Chuck Hagel appointed her to a panel to review the handling of sexual assault cases in the military. She was appointed to the Homeland Security Advisory Council in 2014, but resigned in protest of the family separation policy for the Mexico–United States border.

Clinton's impeachment was opposed by Holtzman, who stated that the crimes he was accused of were not comparable to the crimes that Richard Nixon was accused of. She also said that Ken Starr "overstepped his jurisdiction" by not conducting his report in a similar manner to Leon Jaworski, the special counsel for Nixon's impeachment. In 2006, she wrote in favor of impeaching President George W. Bush in The Nation.

== Early politics ==
Holtzman worked on Adlai Stevenson II's and Eugene McCarthy's presidential campaigns. She was a liaison officer in the Parks, Recreation, and Cultural Affairs Administration from 1967 to 1970, during John Lindsay's mayoralty. She left her position as a liaison officer to run for the New York State Democratic Committee from Flatbush, Brooklyn. She conducted her campaign from her parents' basement. In 1970, Holtzman filed suit against a law that placed incumbents at the top of the ballot line; the New York Court of Appeals ruled in her favor, five to two. Holtzman founded the Brooklyn Women's Political Caucus.

== United States House of Representatives ==
=== Elections ===
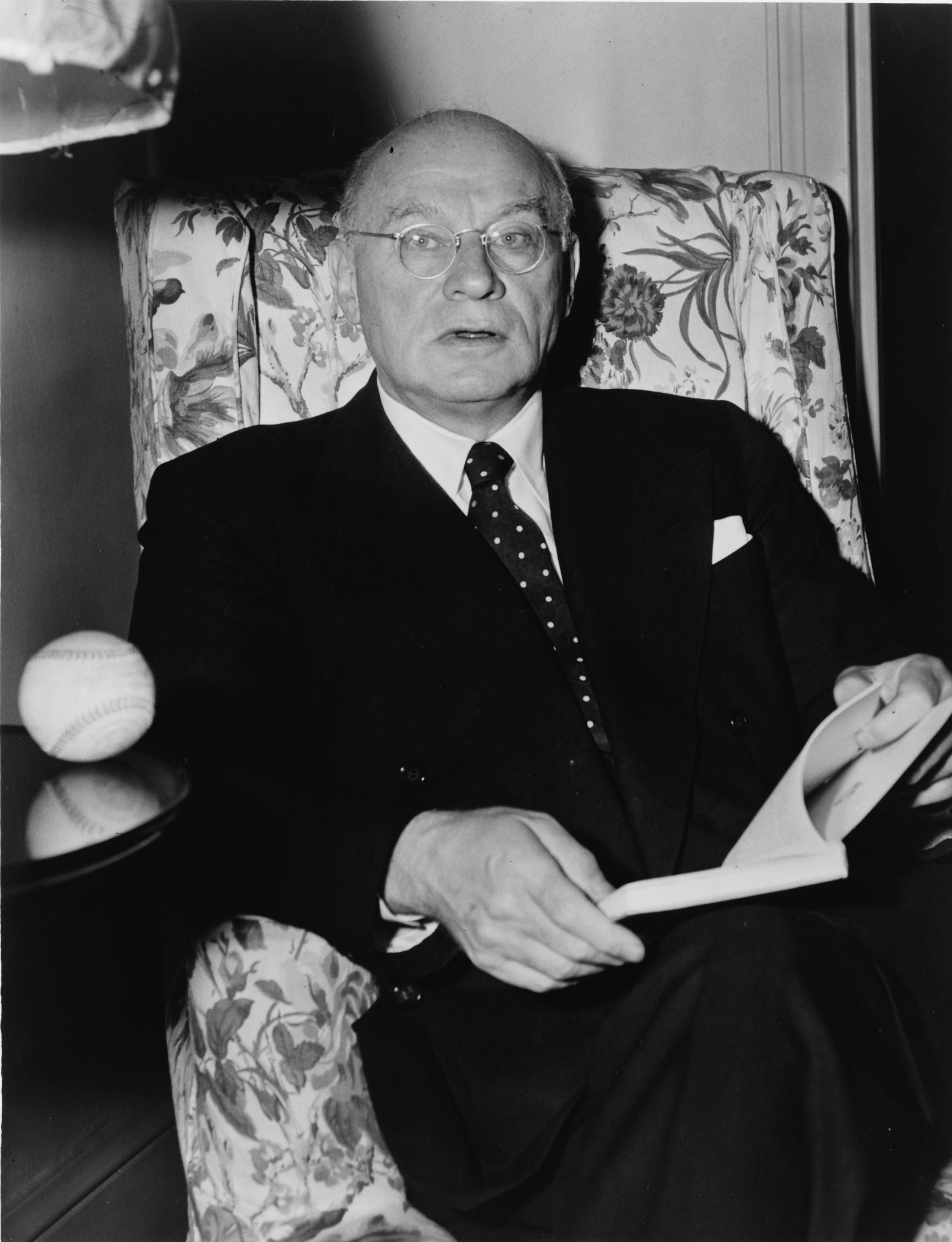
Representative Emanuel Celler (pictured in 1951) was defeated by Holtzman in the 1972 Democratic primary making him the most senior member of the United States House of Representatives to lose renomination.

On March 28, 1972, Holtzman announced her candidacy for the Democratic nomination for the United States House of Representatives from New York's 16th congressional district. Michael Churchill was her campaign manager. In the primary, she faced incumbent Representative Emanuel Celler, the dean of the House of Representatives and chair of the Judiciary Committee, who was first elected in 1922. It was the first time Holtzman had run for public office. She believed that Celler was vulnerable as he had no district office, his residency was under question, and he largely went unmentioned in his district's political circles. After she filed to run against him, Celler said, "As far as I'm concerned, she doesn't exist." Holtzman criticized Celler's low voting attendance, which she said negated his seniority.

Celler had the support of the Liberal Party of New York and the Democratic political machine in Brooklyn. This was the second time that he had faced opposition in a primary. Holtzman raised around $32,000 and borrowed $4,000 during the primary, though she was told she needed $100,000 to run her campaign. She defeated Celler and Robert O'Donnell in the primary. Donald Zimmerman, who aided in the redistricting after the 1970 United States census, stated that Celler's demand that his district remain Jewish, rather than a proposed 60-40 split between whites and blacks, caused him to lose as Zimmerman did not "think Liz could have won as a reformer in a district that wasn't all Jewish."

Celler attempted to have the primary voided and another one held, but Brooklyn Supreme Court Judge Dominic Rinaldi ruled against him and the Appellate Division of the New York Supreme Court ruled unanimously against him. The New York Court of Appeals ruled five to two against Celler. Although Celler was still on the general election ballot as the Liberal Party nominee, he announced on September 28 that he would end his campaign. Holtzman defeated Republican nominee Nicholas R. Macchio Jr. and Conservative nominee William Sampol in the election.

Celler was the longest-serving House member to lose reelection, and blamed his defeat on his own overconfidence. Time called Holtzman "Liz the Lion Killer". At the time, she was the youngest woman ever elected to the United States Congress, at age 31. This was later outdone by Elise Stefanik, who was elected to Congress in 2014 at age 30, and who was in turn surpassed by Alexandria Ocasio-Cortez, who was elected to Congress in 2018 at age 29.

In the 1974 election, Holtzman, who also had the Liberal nomination, defeated Republican and Conservative nominee Joseph L. Gentili. On June 15, 1976, she announced that she would run for reelection and defeated Republican and Conservative nominee Gladys Pemberton in the 1976 election. She defeated Republican and United Taxpayers nominee Larry Penner and Conservative nominee John H. Fox in the 1978 election. Holtzman left the House after four terms in order to run for the Senate.

Edolphus Towns, who was later elected to Congress, campaigned with Holtzman during the 1972 primary. Bob Beckel, who later managed Walter Mondale's presidential campaign, volunteered on one of Holtzman's campaigns.

=== Tenure ===
During Holtzman's tenure in the House of Representatives, she served on the Judiciary Committee and chaired the Judiciary Subcommittee on Immigration, Refugees, and International Law. She was the first female member of the Democratic Party to serve on the Budget Committee. She was one of the 15 founding members of the Congresswomen's Caucus and co-chaired it with Margaret Heckler. In 1977, Speaker Tip O'Neill selected her to be one of the two members of the House of Representatives on the National Commission on the Observance of International Women's Year.

On April 19, 1973, Holtzman filed suit against Nixon in the United States District Court for the Eastern District of New York, saying that he had violated the law by conducting Operation Menu without Congress's approval. Three members of the United States Air Force joined her lawsuit and Burt Neuborne worked as her lawyer. According to the American Civil Liberties Union, which represented her, it was the second time that a member of Congress had challenged the legality of a president's conduct in war since Abraham Lincoln questioned the Mexican–American War. Judge Orrin Grimmell Judd ruled in Holtzman's favor on July 25, 1973, and issued an order to end the bombings, but the United States Court of Appeals for the Second Circuit reversed the decision. Supreme Court Justice Thurgood Marshall upheld the court's stay of proceedings, but Justice William O. Douglas vacated the stay order on August 4, causing the bombing suspension to be returned. Three hours later, Marshall and the other justices halted the original ruling, ordering the suspension of bombings to circumvent Douglas's decision. Chief Justice Warren E. Burger declined to call a special term for the court to hear the case.

In 1979, U.S. Representative Jimmy Wilson, who had narrowly lost reelection the previous year to Buddy Leach, accused Leach of purchasing enough votes to win both the primary and general elections. The House voted 241 to 153 not to advance Wilson's objections on a mostly party-line vote. Holtzman was one of only four Democrats to vote in support of Wilson's challenge.

Holtzman supported George McGovern in the 1972 Democratic presidential primaries and was a delegate to the Democratic National Convention. She endorsed Herman Badillo for the Democratic nomination during the 1973 New York City mayoral election. She endorsed Ramsey Clark's New York senatorial campaign during the 1974 election. She supported Governor Hugh Carey in the 1978 gubernatorial election. She received two delegate votes for the vice-presidential nomination at the 1980 Democratic National Convention.

==== Watergate ====
Holtzman was one of the first members of the Judiciary Committee to support starting impeachment proceedings against Nixon, in 1973. The committee voted, with Holtzman voting no, to extend the deadline for Nixon to hand over his tape recordings. She voted in favor of an attempt by Representative John Conyers to have Nixon cited for contempt of Congress that failed, 32 to 5.

Holtzman wrote Article IV of the impeachment charges, which charged Nixon with the violation of the War Powers Clause, and it was introduced by Conyers. It failed, 26 to 12, and Holtzman later said, "I regret it, because I think the right to take people's lives unilaterally and secretly and with enormous power, and the perversion of that power, is certainly as serious as anything else the President did."

Holtzman voted against advancing Gerald Ford's vice presidential confirmation in the Judiciary Committee and at the final vote. She asked Ford whether he had made a deal with Nixon to pardon him. She also asked if the pardon and an agreement that the tapes belonged to Nixon was in order to prevent the release of conversations between him and Nixon. She, Conyers, and Henry S. Reuss asked Charles Ruff to investigate Ford for perjury at his vice-presidential confirmation hearing. She also asked Attorney General Edward H. Levi to investigate claims of perjury and alleged a cover-up after he declined to investigate. She made a motion in the Judiciary Committee to launch a probe into the pardon, but it failed, four to three.

== United States Senate campaigns ==
=== 1980 election ===
It was speculated that Holtzman might run in the 1976 United States Senate election in New York. She said that she was "testing the voters" for a senatorial campaign on May 5, 1979. On January 8, 1980, she announced her senatorial candidacy, being the first Democrat to formally announce, for the 1980 election. Linda Davidoff was her campaign manager.

At the state Democratic convention, Holtzman received 38% of the delegate vote on the first ballot, above the required 25% support to appear on the ballot without petitioning, but not enough to gain the party's endorsement. She attempted to gain the Liberal nomination, but the party selected incumbent Senator Jacob Javits. She won the Democratic primary, making her the first woman to win a major-party U.S. Senate nomination in New York.

Republican, Conservative, and Right to Life nominee Al D'Amato defeated Holtzman. D'Amato's victory was attributed to Javits splitting the vote between him and Holtzman, and she lost by 1% to D'Amato as a result. She raised $1,869,183 and spent $2,003,548 during the campaign. She did not concede the election. Holtzman attributed her defeat to a lack of financial support from the Democratic Party and President Jimmy Carter's unpopularity.

Holtzman was included in polling as a possible challenger to Daniel Patrick Moynihan in the 1982 U.S. Senate election. It was speculated that Holtzman might run in the 1986 Senate election, but she declined, saying that she would not be able to match D'Amato's fundraising.

=== 1992 election ===
On February 6, 1992, Holtzman announced her candidacy for the Democratic nomination in the 1992 U.S. Senate election. She filed a complaint against D'Amato to the United States Senate Select Committee on Ethics, accusing him of illegally using his franking privilege, worth $461,000, to send a letter to three million New Yorkers stating that there was not enough evidence to charge him in 1991, but the committee dismissed the complaint. At the state Democratic convention, Holtzman received 28% of the delegate vote on the first ballot, but her support declined to 2% on the second ballot and 1% on the third ballot. Geraldine Ferraro won the endorsement.

Holtzman focused on negative advertising against Ferraro, saying that it was "a legitimate and valid way of showing the voters the differences", as Ferraro was declining to attend debates at the time. Governor Mario Cuomo and Ms. founding editor Letty Cottin Pogrebin criticized her for the ads. Holtzman also demanded that Ferraro donate $340,000 to child sex abuse victims, the amount of rent she had received from Star Distributors Inc., a photographing company that was alleged to be affiliated with the mafia.

Multiple feminists criticized Holtzman for her attacks on Ferraro, including Pogrebin and Bella Abzug, though Betty Friedan endorsed Holtzman. She placed last of the four candidates in the Democratic primary, after having raised $3,037,868 and spent $2,929,109, and was accused of costing Ferraro the primary. Ferraro said that Holtzman's negative campaigning hurt Democratic nominee Robert Abrams in the general election and allowed D'Amato to win reelection.

== Municipal politics ==
=== District Attorney ===
Brooklyn District Attorney Eugene Gold declined to run for reelection in 1981, and wanted his executive assistant Norman Rosen to succeed him. Holtzman launched her campaign on July 22, and was given the Liberal ballot line while Rosen received the Republican line. Rosen was supported by Mayor Ed Koch and Brooklyn's Democratic political machine. During the campaign, Rosen ran a radio commercial that stated, "Liz Holtzman, she's a nice girl; maybe I'd like to have her as a daughter, but not as a DA." Holtzman won the nomination due to strong support from black voters. Her election made her first female district attorney in New York City and the second in New York State.

Holtzman was an opponent of Meade Esposito, the chair of the Brooklyn Democratic Party and its political machine, during her political career and reduced his control over the district attorney's office. Before her tenure, black people were excluded from working in the homicide bureau. The police union picketed her office in 1985, calling her a "persecutor of cops" and claimed she was "soft on crime" after she created a special unit to investigate police brutality.

=== Comptroller ===
Harrison J. Goldin, the New York City Comptroller, ran in the 1989 mayoral election. Holtzman announced her campaign to succeed him on July 16, 1989. In the 1993 primary she was challenged by Alan Hevesi, who was supported by Ferraro, and Herman Badillo, who was supported by Koch.

Fleet Financial Group loaned $455,000 to Holtzman's 1992 senatorial campaign. Sheila Levin, the chief fundraiser for the Re-Elect Liz Holtzman Committee, was investigated by the New York City Department of Investigation and New York County District Attorney for providing false information on the bank application. The NYCDOI report found Holtzman "grossly negligent" and stated that Levin accepted $3,000 in campaign contributions from Fleet executives. Holtzman placed second in the primary and lost the runoff to Hevesi, with the controversy around her campaign loan being blamed for her defeat.

Adam Clayton Powell IV worked as an aide to Holtzman during her tenure as comptroller.

== Later campaigns ==
Holtzman was rumored to have considered running in other races over the years, including to succeed Andrew Cuomo as attorney general of New York in the 2010 election, and running in the special election to replace Anthony Weiner as the representative from New York's 9th congressional district after Weiner resigned in 2011. She ran for the Democratic nomination in New York's 10th congressional district in the 2022 election, finishing 6th in a crowded field of candidates with 4.4% of the vote.

== Political positions ==
=== Equality ===
Holtzman supported the Equal Rights Amendment and was the leading sponsor of legislation to extend its deadline. She criticized Celler during the 1972 election for opposing the legislation and preventing its passage by the Judiciary Committee.

Holtzman called for George Scratchley Brown, the chairman of the Joint Chiefs of Staff, to be removed from his position after he claimed that Jews controlled the banking system and newspapers.

The Irish Lesbian and Gay Organization was excluded from the 1992 New York City St. Patrick's Day Parade. Holtzman and other elected officials boycotted the parade and instead marched with the ILGO in a separate parade.

=== Foreign policy ===
Holtzman voted against the War Powers Resolution, saying that the "actual effect would be to sanction for 123 days combat operations initiated solely by the President". She supported the Nuclear Freeze campaign and ending the testing of nuclear weapons. She traveled to Egypt and Israel on December 20, 1977, and met with President Anwar Sadat and Prime Minister Menachem Begin.

Holtzman criticized President Jimmy Carter for offering to sell fighter planes to Egypt, Israel, and Saudi Arabia in 1979. She opposed Carter's decision to reinstitute the Selective Service System registration requirement. She called for Carter to appoint a special prosecutor to investigate Billy Carter's connections with Libya.

While campaigning in 2022, Holtzman said she was "totally opposed to the BDS movement."

=== Healthcare ===
During the 1992 election Holtzman proposed the creation of a single-payer healthcare system.

=== Immigration ===
Holtzman criticized the Immigration and Naturalization Service in April 1974 for allowing around 50 alleged Nazi war criminals to live in the U.S. In 1977, she and 42 other representatives introduced legislation calling for the deportation of all aliens who had engaged in Nazi war crimes. The INS reopened its case on Andrija Artuković, an Ustaše war criminal, at the request of Holtzman and other members of Congress. Holtzman asked for Austrian President Kurt Waldheim not to be allowed inside the U.S. due to his involvement with the Nazis. In 1977, she proposed legislation, co-sponsored by 39 Democratic and 11 Republican members of the House, that would require the deportation of all aliens who participated in Nazi war crimes and bar them from the U.S.

Holtzman, Joshua Eilberg, Chris Dodd, Hamilton Fish IV, and Edward Mezvinsky traveled to Moscow and Leningrad in 1975 to study the Soviet Union's treatment of Jews. In 1974, she was one of 39 members of Congress to sign a letter asking Nixon to help the 4,500 Syrian Jews. During a speech by Andrei Gromyko at United Nations headquarters, Holtzman and 84 other people protested the Soviet Union's reduction of its Jewish emigration quota.

Holtzman sent a list of South Vietnamese people, including Nguyễn Cao Kỳ and Nguyễn Ngọc Loan, to the INS for investigation of their involvement in war crimes. Nguyễn Ngọc Loan was going to be deported to stand trial in Vietnam for the execution of Nguyễn Văn Lém, but Carter halted his deportation.

In 1975, Holtzman voted against legislation to give Robert E. Lee his citizenship back and unsuccessfully proposed an amendment to extend the citizenship return to draft dodgers and protesters who renounced their citizenship in protest of the Vietnam War. She asked the INS to investigate Sun Myung Moon, asking whether he could be deported for inducing or assisting the entry of illegal immigrants or for failing to report his criminal record. She and Senator Ted Kennedy wrote the Refugee Act of 1980.

=== Ratings ===
Holtzman was the only member of Congress to receive a 100% rating from Ralph Nader's Public Citizen in 1976, and one of four in 1978. She received a 100% rating from the Consumer Federation of America.

== Electoral history ==
Electoral history of Kevin Kiley
Year	Office	Party	Primary			General			Result	Ref.
Year	Office	Party	Total	%	P.	Total	%	P.	Result	Ref.
1972	United States House of Representatives (NY-19)	Democratic				96,984	65.58%	1st	Won	
1974	United States House of Representatives (NY-16)	Democratic/Liberal				74,010	78.89%	1st	Won	
1976	United States House of Representatives (NY-16)	Democratic/Liberal				93,995	82.87%	1st	Won	
1978	United States House of Representatives (NY-16)	Democratic/Liberal				59,703	81.91%	1st	Won	
1980	United States Senate (NY)	Democratic/Liberal	378,567	40.74%	1st	2,618,661	43.54%	2nd	Lost	
1981	Brooklyn District Attorney	Democratic/Liberal			1st	209,651	66.86%	1st	Won	
1992	United States Senate (NY)	Democratic/Liberal	144,026	12.49%	4th	Lost nomination			Lost	
2022	United States House of Representatives (NY-10)	Democratic	2,845	4.4%	6th	Lost nomination			Lost	

== Books ==
- Who Said It Would Be Easy?: One Woman's Life in the Political Arena (with Cynthia L. Cooper). Arcade Publishing (May 30, 1996); ISBN 978-1-55970-302-4
- The Impeachment of George W. Bush: A Practical Guide for Concerned Citizens (with Cynthia L. Cooper). Nation Books (August 22, 2006); ISBN 978-1-56025-940-4
- Cheating Justice: How Bush and Cheney Attacked the Rule of Law and Plotted to Avoid Prosecution- and What We Can Do about It (with Cynthia L. Cooper). Beacon Press (February 7, 2012); ISBN 978-0-8070-0321-3
- The Case for Impeaching Trump. Hot Books (January 1, 2019); ISBN 978-1-5107-4477-6

== See also ==
- List of Jewish members of the United States Congress
- Women in the United States House of Representatives

== Works cited ==
=== Books ===
- Conway, Jill; Bourque, Susan (1989). Learning About Women: Gender, Politics, & Power. Ann Arbor, Michigan: University of Michigan Press. ISBN 978-0-472-06398-7.
- Lamson, Peggy (1979). In the Vanguard: Six American Women in Public Life. Boston, Massachusetts: Houghton Mifflin Harcourt. ISBN 978-0-395-27608-2.
- Le Veness, Frank; Sweeney, Jane (1987). Women Leaders in Contemporary U.S. Politics. Boulder, Colorado: Lynne Rienner Publishers. doi:10.1515/9781685859480. ISBN 978-0-931477-87-4.
- Moore, John; Preimesberger, Jon; Tarr, David, eds. (2001). Congressional Quarterly's Guide to U.S. Elections. Congressional Quarterly. ISBN 1-56802-602-1.
- Moritz, Charles (1973). Current Biography: 1973. H. W. Wilson Company. ISBN 978-0-8242-0543-0.

=== News ===
- "Elizabeth Holtzman". The New York Times. June 22, 1972. Archived from the original on May 6, 2021.
- Holtzman, Elizabeth (January 11, 2006). "The Impeachment of George W. Bush". The Nation. Archived from the original on March 18, 2006.
- Kurtz, Howard (October 27, 1987). "The Private Public Prosecutor". The Washington Post. Archived from the original on June 13, 2018.
- Lardner, George (December 9, 1998). "White House Strategy: It's Bad, but It's Not Watergate". The Washington Post. Archived from the original on March 5, 2016.

=== Newspapers ===
- "Holtzman is 'the comeback kid'". The Daily Times. September 15, 1993. p. 6. Archived from the original on July 14, 2022 – via Newspapers.com.
- "Holtzman Runs To Her Own Beat". Newsday. September 6, 1989. p. 27. Archived from the original on June 11, 2022 – via Newspapers.com.
- "Liz Holtzman loses comptroller race". The Journal News. September 29, 1993. p. 1. Archived from the original on July 14, 2022 – via Newspapers.com.
- "Ms. Holtzman To Teach". The Buffalo News. February 24, 1981. p. 2 – via Newspapers.com.
- "Negro Admitted Perjury, Court Told". The Atlanta Journal-Constitution. November 19, 1963. p. 17. Archived from the original on June 8, 2022 – via Newspapers.com.
- "New Yorkers finally get chance to vote". The Herald Statesman. September 22, 1981. p. 1. Archived from the original on June 11, 2022 – via Newspapers.com.
- "Overseers take office". Star-Gazette. June 18, 1976. p. 7. Archived from the original on July 16, 2022 – via Newspapers.com.
- "Report calls Holtzman 'grossly negligent'". The Daily Times. September 16, 1993. p. 18. Archived from the original on July 14, 2022 – via Newspapers.com.
- "Winner Over Celler Urged New Politics". Danville Register & Bee. June 21, 1972. p. 33. Archived from the original on June 8, 2022 – via Newspapers.com.
- Berkowitz, Harry (September 6, 1993). "Going to the Tape". Newsday. p. 15. Archived from the original on July 14, 2022 – via Newspapers.com.
- Calderone, Joe; Weber, Michael; Chiles, Nick (September 11, 1993). "Loan Arranger". Newsday. p. 3. Archived from the original on July 14, 2022 – via Newspapers.com.
- Campbell, Don (March 5, 1981). "Moynihan vulnerable in election". Press & Sun-Bulletin. p. 1A – via Newspapers.com.
- Collins, Gail (June 2, 1993). "An Endless Summer Stupor of Politics". Newsday. p. 6. Archived from the original on July 14, 2022 – via Newspapers.com.
- Collins, Dan (September 23, 1981). "Holtzman carries minority vote". Staten Island Advance. p. A3 – via Newspapers.com.
- Duggan, Dennis (May 25, 1981). "Redesigning the Districts Draws Political Divisions". Newsday. p. 10 – via Newspapers.com.
- Fitzgerald, Owen (July 29, 1981). "Everything's comin' up Rosen in DA race". New York Daily News. p. K3 – via Newspapers.com.
- Fitzgerald, Owen (July 22, 1981). "Liz Holtzman in running for Brooklyn DA". New York Daily News. p. 7 – via Newspapers.com.
- Lieberman, Mark (June 3, 1981). "Gold's departure may start a primary fight among Dems". New York Daily News. p. K4 – via Newspapers.com.
- Liff, Bob (July 17, 1989). "Holtzman Makes It Official". Newsday. p. 3. Archived from the original on June 11, 2022 – via Newspapers.com.
- McLaughlin, John (November 8, 1983). "Victory: More black voters". The Daily Times. p. 8. Archived from the original on June 11, 2022 – via Newspapers.com.
- Rivera, Elaine (August 16, 1991). "Divided by Ethnic Lines". Newsday. p. 37. Archived from the original on June 11, 2022 – via Newspapers.com.

=== Web ===
- "1974 United States election results" (PDF). Clerk of the United States House of Representatives. p. 26. Archived (PDF) from the original on November 13, 2018.
- "1976 United States election results" (PDF). Clerk of the United States House of Representatives. p. 33. Archived (PDF) from the original on February 24, 2021.
- "1978 United States election results" (PDF). Clerk of the United States House of Representatives. p. 25. Archived (PDF) from the original on February 24, 2021.
- "Audio collection of Elizabeth Holtzman, 1973-2006". Harvard Library. Archived from the original on June 8, 2022.
- "Holtzman, Elizabeth 1941-". Biographical Directory of the United States Congress. Archived from the original on April 5, 2022.
- "Hon. Elizabeth Holtzman biography". Herrick. Archived from the original on April 11, 2021.
- "Statistics of the Presidential and Congressional Election of November 7, 1972". United States House of Representatives. March 15, 1973. p. 31. Archived from the original on June 11, 2022.

U.S. House of Representatives
Preceded by John Murphy	Member of the U.S. House of Representatives from New York's 4th congressional district 1973–1981	Succeeded by Chuck Schumer
New office	Chair of the Congressional Women's Caucus; 1977–1979	Succeeded by Pat Schroeder
Party political offices
Preceded by Ramsey Clark	Democratic nominee for U.S. Senator from New York (Class 3); 1980	Succeeded by Mark Green
Legal offices
Preceded by Eugene Gold	District Attorney of Kings County; 1982–1989	Succeeded by Charles J. Hynes
Political offices
Preceded by Harrison J. Goldin	Comptroller of New York City; 1990–1993	Succeeded by Alan Hevesi
U.S. order of precedence (ceremonial)
Preceded by Lewis F. Payne Jr. as Former U.S. Representative	Order of precedence of the United States as Former U.S. Representative	Succeeded by George J. Hochbrueckner as Former U.S. Representative
