= Jacob Javits =

American lawyer and politician (1904–1986)

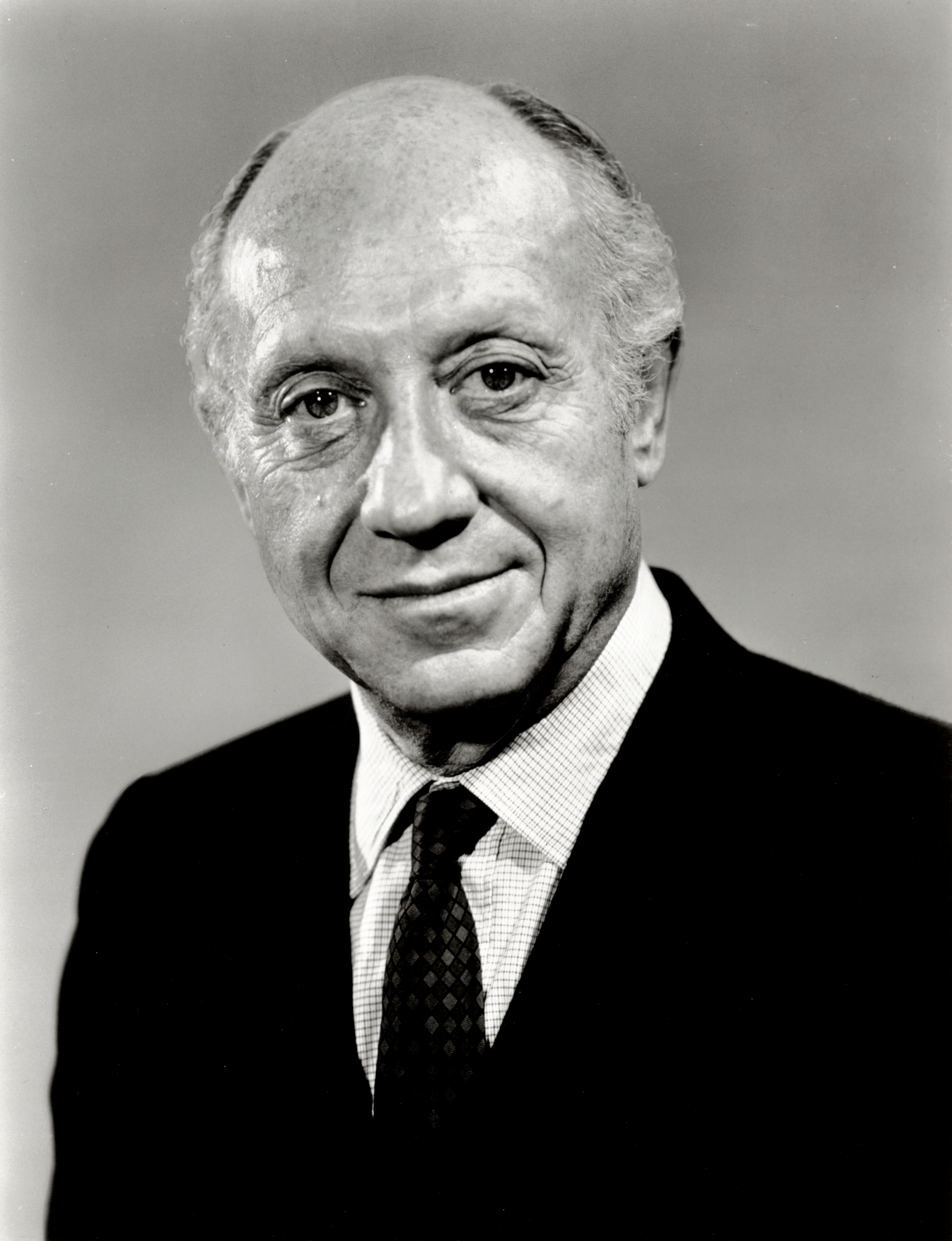

United States Senator from New York
- In office January 9, 1957 – January 3, 1981
- Preceded by: Herbert Lehman
- Succeeded by: Al D'Amato
Senate positions
Ranking Member of the Senate Labor Committee
In office January 3, 1965 – January 3, 1979
| Preceded by | Barry Goldwater |
| Succeeded by | Richard Schweiker |

58th Attorney General of New York
- In office January 1, 1955 – January 9, 1957
- Governor: W. Averell Harriman
- Preceded by: Nathaniel L. Goldstein
- Succeeded by: Louis Lefkowitz

Member of the U.S. House of Representatives from New York's 21st district
- In office January 3, 1947 – December 31, 1954
- Preceded by: James H. Torrens
- Succeeded by: Herbert Zelenko

Personal details
- Born: Jacob Koppel Javits; May 18, 1904 New York City, U.S.
- Died: March 7, 1986 (aged 81) West Palm Beach, Florida, U.S.
- Resting place: Linden Hills Jewish Cemetery, New York City, U.S.
- Party: Republican
- Other political affiliations: Liberal
- Spouses: Marjorie Joan Ringling (m. 1933; div. 1936) Marian Ann Borris (m. 1947)
- Relations: Jacob Emden (ancestor); Eric M. Javits (nephew)
- Children: 3
- Education: Columbia University (BA); New York University (LLB)
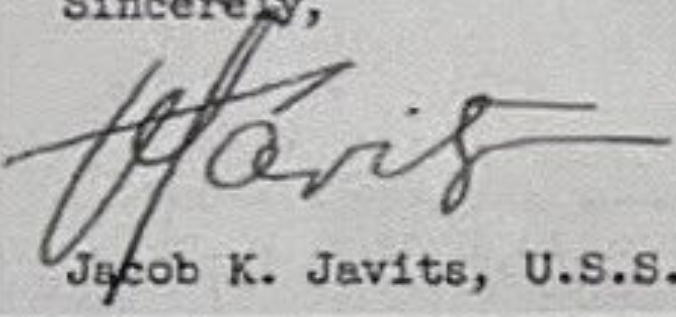
- Signature

Military service
- Allegiance: United States
- Branch/service: United States Army
- Years of service: 1942–1946
- Rank: Lieutenant colonel
- Unit: Chemical Warfare Service
- Battles/wars: World War II
- Awards: Legion of Merit
- Jacob Javits's voice Javits expressing his hopes for reform in the Republican party Recorded November 6, 1974

Jacob Koppel Javits (/ˈdʒævɪts/ JAV-its; May 18, 1904 – March 7, 1986) was an American lawyer and politician from the U.S. state of New York. A member of the Republican Party, he served in both chambers of the United States Congress, a member of the United States House of Representatives from 1947 to 1954 and a member of the United States Senate from 1957 to 1981. He also served as Attorney General of New York from 1955 to 1957. Generally considered a liberal Republican, he was often at odds with his own party. A supporter of labor unions, the Great Society, and the civil rights movement, he played a key role in the passing of civil rights legislation. An opponent of the Vietnam War, he drafted the War Powers Resolution in 1973.

Born to Jewish parents, Javits was raised in a tenement on the Lower East Side of Manhattan. He graduated from the New York University School of Law and established a law practice in New York City. During World War II, he served in the United States Army's Chemical Warfare Department. Outraged by the corruption of Tammany Hall, Javits joined the Republican Party and supported New York Mayor Fiorello H. La Guardia. He was elected to the U.S. House of Representatives in 1946 and served in that body until 1954. In the House, Javits supported President Harry S. Truman's Cold War foreign policy and voted to fund the Marshall Plan. He defeated Franklin D. Roosevelt Jr. in the 1954 election for Attorney General of New York, and defeated Democrat Robert F. Wagner Jr. in the 1956 U.S. Senate election.

In the Senate, Javits supported much of President Lyndon B. Johnson's Great Society programs and civil rights legislation, including the Civil Rights Act of 1964 and the Voting Rights Act of 1965. He voted for the Gulf of Tonkin Resolution but came to question Johnson's handling of the War in Vietnam. To rein in presidential war powers, Javits sponsored the War Powers Resolution. Javits also sponsored the Employee Retirement Income Security Act of 1974, which regulated defined-benefit private pensions. In 1980, Javits lost the Republican Senate primary to Al D'Amato, who campaigned to Javits's right. Nonetheless, he ran in the general election as the Liberal Party nominee. He and Democratic nominee Elizabeth Holtzman were defeated by D'Amato. Javits died of amyotrophic lateral sclerosis in West Palm Beach, Florida, in 1986.

== Early life and education ==
Javits was born to Jewish parents, Ida (née Littman) and Morris Javits. Javits grew up in a teeming Lower East Side tenement, and when not in school, he helped his mother sell dry goods from a pushcart in the street and learned parliamentary procedure at the University Settlement Society of New York. Javits graduated in 1920 from George Washington High School, where he was president of his class. He worked part-time at various jobs while he attended night school at Columbia University, then in 1923 he enrolled in the New York University Law School from which he earned his LLB in 1926. He was admitted to the bar in June 1927 and joined his brother Benjamin Javits, who was nearly ten years older, as partner to form the Javits and Javits law firm. The Javits brothers specialized in bankruptcy and minority stockholder suits and became quite successful. In 1933, Javits married Marjorie Joan Ringling, daughter of Alfred Thedore "Alf" Ringling, one of the Ringling brothers of the Ringling Brothers Circus fame. They had no children and divorced in 1936. In 1947, he married Marian Javits with whom he had three children. Deemed too old for regular military service when World War II began, Javits was commissioned in early 1942 as an officer in the United States Army's Chemical Warfare Service. Assigned as assistant to the chief of the Chemical Warfare Service, he served in the European and Pacific theaters, and in the United States. Javits attained the rank of lieutenant colonel before he was discharged in 1946, and he was a recipient of the Legion of Merit and Army Commendation Ribbon.

== Political career ==
In his youth Javits had watched his father work as a ward heeler for Tammany Hall, and he had experienced firsthand the corruption and graft associated with that notorious political machine. Tammany's operations repulsed Javits so much that he forever rejected the city's Democratic Party and in the early 1930s joined the Republican-Fusion Party and the New York Young Republican Club, which was supporting the mayoral campaigns of Fiorello H. La Guardia. After the war, he became the chief researcher for Jonah Goldstein's unsuccessful 1945 bid for mayor on the Republican-Liberal-Fusion ticket. Javits's hard work in the Goldstein campaign showed his potential in the political arena and encouraged the small Manhattan Republican Party to nominate him as their candidate for the Upper West Side's Twenty-first Congressional District (since redistricted) seat during the heavily-Republican year of 1946. Although the Republicans had not held the seat since 1923, Javits campaigned energetically and won. He was a member of the freshman class, along with John F. Kennedy of Massachusetts and Richard Nixon of California. He served from 1947 to 1954, when he resigned his seat to take office as Attorney General of New York.

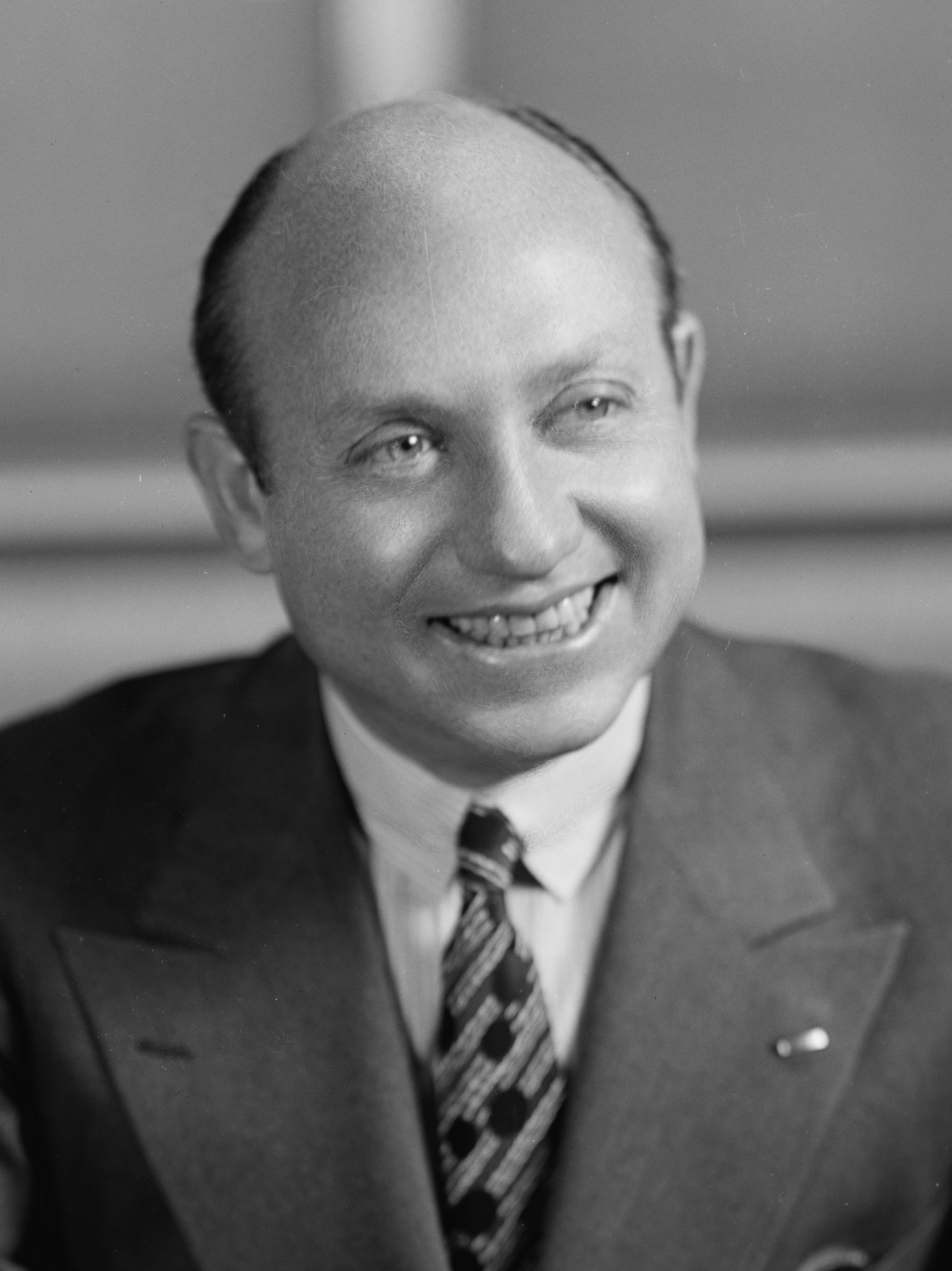
Javits in 1955

During his first two terms in the House, Javits often sided with the Truman administration. For example, in 1947 he supported Harry S. Truman's veto of the Taft-Hartley Act, which he declared to be antiunion. A strong opponent of discrimination, Javits also endorsed legislation against the poll tax in 1947 and 1949, and in 1954, he unsuccessfully sought to have enacted a bill banning racial segregation in federally-funded housing projects. Unhappy with the witch-hunt atmosphere in Washington during the Cold War, he publicly opposed continuing appropriations for the House Un-American Activities Committee in 1948. Always a staunch supporter of Israel, Javits served on the United States House Committee on Foreign Affairs during all four of his terms and supported congressional funding for the Marshall Plan and all components of the Truman Doctrine.

In 1954, Javits ran for Attorney General of New York against a well-known and well-funded opponent, Franklin D. Roosevelt Jr. Javits's vote-getting abilities carried the day, and he was the only Republican to win a statewide office that year. As attorney general, Javits continued to promote his liberal agenda by supporting such measures as anti-bias employment legislation and a health insurance program for state employees.

=== U.S. Senator ===
In 1956, Javits ran for U.S. Senator from New York to succeed the retiring incumbent Democrat Herbert H. Lehman. His Democratic opponent was the popular Mayor of New York, Robert F. Wagner Jr. In the early stages of that campaign Javits vigorously and successfully denied charges that he had once sought support from members of the American Communist Party during his 1946 race for Congress. He went on to defeat Wagner by nearly half a million votes. Although his term began on January 3, 1957, he delayed taking his seat in the U.S. Senate until January 9, the day the New York State Legislature convened, to deny Democratic Governor W. Averell Harriman the opportunity to appoint a Democratic Attorney General. Thus, on January 9, the Republican majority of the State Legislature elected Louis J. Lefkowitz to fill the office for the remainder of Javits's term.

Upon taking office, Javits resumed his role as the most outspoken Republican liberal in Congress. For the next 24 years, the Senate was Javits's home. His wife had no interest in living in Washington, D.C., which she considered a boring backwater and so for over two decades Javits commuted between New York and Washington nearly every week to visit his "other" family and conduct local political business. In foreign affairs, he backed the Eisenhower Doctrine for the Middle East and pressed for more foreign military and economic assistance. Javits was re-elected in 1962, 1968, and 1974.

Javits voted in favor of the Civil Rights Acts of 1957, 1960, 1964, and 1968, as well as the 24th Amendment to the U.S. Constitution, the Voting Rights Act of 1965, and the confirmation of Thurgood Marshall to the U.S. Supreme Court. He endorsed Lyndon B. Johnson's Great Society programs. To promote his views on social legislation, he served on the Senate Labor and Human Resources Committee for twenty years, most of that time as the second-ranking minority member. Javits initially backed Johnson during the early years of America's involvement in the Vietnam War and supported, for example, the Gulf of Tonkin Resolution in 1964 but later turned against it. Also in 1964, Javits joined David Rockefeller to launch the non-profit International Executive Service Corps, which was established to help bring about prosperity and stability in developing nations through the growth of private enterprise.

During the 1964 Republican Party presidential primaries, Javits, alongside fellow New York Republicans Kenneth Keating, John Lindsay and Seymour Halpern, refused to endorse Barry Goldwater, the conservative senator from Arizona.

A supporter of universal health care, Javits in 1970 drafted a bill called "Medicare for All" that would have expanded the Medicare program to every American citizen by the end of 1973, while also giving the citizen a choice to opt-out, and alongside Clifford P. Case, John Sherman Cooper and William B. Saxbe, was one of four Republican co-sponsors of the Ted Kennedy-Martha Griffiths universal health care bill in January 1971.

In 1966, along with two other Republican senators and five Republican representatives, Javits signed a telegram sent to Georgia Governor Carl Sanders regarding the Georgia legislature's refusal to seat the recently elected Julian Bond in their state House of Representatives. The refusal, said the telegram, was "a dangerous attack on representative government. None of us agree with Mr. Bond's views on the Vietnam War; in fact we strongly repudiate these views. But unless otherwise determined by a court of law, which the Georgia Legislature is not, he is entitled to express them."

By late 1967, Javits was becoming disenchanted with the Vietnam War and joined 22 other senators in calling for a peaceful solution to the conflict.

In 1965, Javits appointed Lawrence Wallace Bradford Jr. as the Senate's first African-American page. In 1971, Javits appointed Paulette Desell as the Senate's first female page.

By 1970, his rising opposition to the war led him to support the Cooper–Church Amendment, which barred funds for US troops in Cambodia, and he also voted to repeal the Gulf of Tonkin Resolution. Increasingly concerned about the erosion of congressional authority in foreign affairs, Javits sponsored the War Powers Resolution in 1973, which limited to 60 days a president's ability to send American armed forces into combat without congressional approval.

Despite his unhappiness with President Richard Nixon over the Vietnam War, Javits was slow to join the anti-Nixon forces during the Watergate scandal of 1973–1974. Until almost the very end of the affair, his position reflected his legal training: Nixon was innocent until proven guilty, and the best way to determine guilt or innocence was by legal due process. His position was unpopular among his constituency, and his re-election in Watergate-tainted 1974 elections over Ramsey Clark was by fewer than 400,000 votes, a third of his 1968 margin of victory. During his last term, Javits shifted his interests more and more to world affairs, especially the crises in the Middle East. Working with President Jimmy Carter, he journeyed to Israel and Egypt to facilitate the discussions that led to the 1978 Camp David Accords.

==== 1980 Senate race ====
Javits served until 1981; his 1979 diagnosis with ALS (also known as Lou Gehrig's Disease) led to a 1980 primary challenge by the comparatively lesser-known Long Island Republican county official Al D'Amato, who received 323,468 primary votes (55.7 percent) to Javits's 257,433 (44.3 percent). Javits's loss to D'Amato stemmed from Javits's continuing illness and from his failure to adjust politically to the rightward movement of the Republican Party.

After the primary defeat, Javits ran as the Liberal Party candidate in the general election. His candidacy split the Democratic base vote with U.S. Representative Elizabeth Holtzman of Brooklyn and gave D'Amato the victory by a plurality of 1%. Javits received 11% of the vote.

== Death ==
Javits died of ALS in West Palm Beach, Florida, at age 81 on March 7, 1986. In addition to spouse Marion Ann Borris Javits, he was survived by three children: Joshua, Carla, and Joy. He was predeceased by his brother, who died in 1973. His nephew, Eric M. Javits, was a diplomat who served as the U.S. representative to the Organisation for the Prohibition of Chemical Weapons and the Conference on Disarmament. He is interred at Linden Hill Jewish Cemetery in Queens, New York.

Javits' funeral service was conducted at the Central Synagogue in Manhattan. 1400 people attended the funeral. Among them were former President Richard Nixon, Governor Mario Cuomo and former Governor Hugh Carey, Mayor Ed Koch and former Mayor John Lindsay, Attorney General Edwin Meese, former Secretary of State Henry Kissinger, Cardinal John Joseph O'Connor, Kurt Vonnegut, David Rockefeller, Victor Gotbaum, Douglas Fairbanks Jr. and Arthur Ochs Sulzberger. Other mourners included Senators Al D'Amato of New York, Gary Hart of Colorado, Nancy Kassebaum of Kansas, Bill Bradley of New Jersey, Lowell Weicker of Connecticut, as well as former U.S. Representative Bella Abzug.

== Legacy ==
Throughout his years in Congress, Javits seldom enjoyed favor with his party's inner circle. Few pieces of legislation bear his name, yet he was especially proud of his work in creating the National Endowment for the Arts, of his sponsorship of the Employee Retirement Income Security Act of 1974, which regulated defined-benefit private pensions, and of his leadership in the passage of the 1973 War Powers Resolution. In 1966, he had a 94% rating from the Americans for Democratic Action.

Javits used his office to advance ideas that furthered the policies even of Democratic presidents. In the fall of 1962, he proposed to a group of NATO parliamentarians that multinational corporations jointly create a new kind of investment vehicle to promote private investment throughout Latin America. He intended his idea to complement President John F. Kennedy's Alliance for Progress. Two years later, some 50 multinational corporations formed the Adela Investment Company, much as Javits had proposed.

Throughout his career in Congress, first in the House and later in the Senate, Javits was part of a small group of liberal Republicans that was often isolated ideologically from their mainstream Republican colleagues, and he was a staunch supporter of labor unions and civil rights movements. One scoring method found Javits to be the most liberal Republican to serve in either chamber of Congress between 1937 and 2002. From 1973 to 1978, GovTrack ranked Javits as being to the left of noted Democrats like Hubert Humphrey, George McGovern, Edmund Muskie and Gaylord Nelson. Although he frequently differed with the most right-leaning members of the Republican Party, Javits believed that both parties should tolerate diverse opinions, rejecting the idea that they should share only one point of view. Javits also saw himself as being a descendant of the traditional Republicanism of Alexander Hamilton, Henry Clay, Abraham Lincoln and Theodore Roosevelt, all of whom supported a strong federal government.

In an essay published in 1958 in the magazine Esquire, Javits predicted the election of the first African-American president by 2000. Javits sponsored the first African-American Senate page in 1965 and the first female page in 1971. His liberalism was such that he tended to receive support from traditionally-Democratic voters, with many Republicans defecting to support the Conservative Party of New York.

Javits played a major role in legislation protecting pensioners, as well as in the passage of the War Powers Act; he led the effort to get the Javits-Wagner-O'Day Act passed. He reached the position of Ranking Minority Member on the Committee on Foreign Relations while he accrured greater seniority than any New York Senator before or since (as of 2018). Along with Dwight Eisenhower, he was among the first and most important statesmen in passing legislation promoting the cause of education for gifted individuals, and many know his name from the federal Jacob Javits Grants established for that purpose.

=== Honors and commemoration ===
Javits received the Presidential Medal of Freedom in 1983.

New York City's sprawling Javits Center was named in his honor in 1986, as is a playground at the southwestern edge of Fort Tryon Park. The Jacob K. Javits Federal Building at 26 Federal Plaza in lower Manhattan's Civic Center district, as well as a lecture hall on the campus of Stony Brook University on Long Island, are also named after him.

The Jacob K. Javits Gifted and Talented Students Education Act of 1988 was named in honor of Javits for his role in promoting gifted education. The United States Department of Education formerly awarded a number of Javits Fellowships to support graduate students in the humanities and social sciences until 2012.

The National Institutes of Health awards the Senator Jacob Javits Award in Neuroscience to exceptionally talented researchers in neuroscience who have established themselves with groundbreaking research. A 1983 US Congressional Act established those awards in honor of Senator Javits as a longtime supporter of research into understanding neurological disorders and diseases.

In his memory, New York University established the Jacob K. Javits Visiting Professorship in 2008.

== Electoral history ==
U.S. House of Representatives, New York 21st District

New York 21st Congressional District General Election, 1946
| Party | Candidate | Votes | % | ±% |
|---|---|---|---|---|
| Republican | Jacob Javits | 37,136 | 36.4% | +5.7% |
| Liberal | Jacob Javits | 9,761 | 9.6% | −0.2% |
| Total | Jacob Javits | 46,897 | 46.0% | +5.5% |
| Democratic | Daniel Flynn | 40,652 | 39.9% | −7.2% |
| American Labor | Eugene Connolly | 14,359 | 14.1% | +1.7% |
| Total votes | | 101,908 | 100.00% | |

New York 21st Congressional District General Election, 1948
| Party | Candidate | Votes | % | ±% | | | | | | | |
|---|---|---|---|---|---|---|---|---|---|---|---|
| Republican | Jacob Javits | 45,820 | 34.8% | −1.6% | | | | | | | |
| Liberal | Jacob Javits | 21,247 | 16.1% | +6.5% | | | | | | | |
| Total | Jacob Javits | 67,067 | 50.9% | +4.9% | | | | | | | |
| Democratic | Paul O'Dwyer | 49,972 | 37.9% | −2.0% | | | | | | | |
| American Labor | Paul O'Dwyer | 14,682 | 11.1% | −3.0% | − class="vcard" | Total | Paul O'Dwyer | 64,654 | 49.1% | −4.9% | − |
| Total votes | | 131,721 | 100.00% | | | | | | | | |

New York 21st Congressional District General Election, 1950
| Party | Candidate | Votes | % | ±% |
|---|---|---|---|---|
| Republican | Jacob Javits | 41,194 | 40.6% | +5.8% |
| Liberal | Jacob Javits | 21,410 | 21.1% | +5.0% |
| Total | Jacob Javits | 62,604 | 61.8% | +10.9% |
| Democratic | Bennett Schlessel | 33,349 | 32.9% | −5.0% |
| American Labor | William Mandel | 5,419 | 5.3% | −5.8% |
| Total votes | | 101,372 | 100.00% | |

New York 21st Congressional District General Election, 1952
| Party | Candidate | Votes | % | ±% |
|---|---|---|---|---|
| Republican | Jacob Javits | 58,128 | 41.2% | +0.6% |
| Liberal | Jacob Javits | 31,738 | 22.5% | +1.4% |
| Total | Jacob Javits | 89,866 | 63.7% | +1.6% |
| Democratic | John C. Hart | 47,637 | 33.6% | +0.7% |
| American Labor | William Mandel | 4,148 | 2.9% | −2.4% |
| Total votes | | 141,051 | 100.00% | |

New York State Attorney General

New York Attorney General election, 1954
| Party | Candidate | Votes | % |
|---|---|---|---|
| Republican | Jacob Javits | 2,603,858 | 51.7% |
| Democratic | Franklin Delano Roosevelt Jr. | 2,430,959 | 48.3% |
| Total votes | | 5,034,817 | 100.00% |

U.S. Senate, New York

1956 United States Senate election in New York
| Party | Candidate | Votes | % |
|---|---|---|---|
| Republican | Jacob K. Javits | 3,723,933 | 53.3% |
| Democratic | Robert F. Wagner Jr. | 2,964,511 | 42.4% |
| Liberal | Robert F. Wagner Jr. | 300,648 | 4.3% |
| Total | Robert F. Wagner, Jr. | 3,265,159 | 46.7% |
| Write-in | Douglas MacArthur | 1,312 | 0.02% |
| Total votes | | 6,990,404 | 100.00% |
| Republican gain from Democratic | | | |

1962 United States Senate election in New York
| Party | Candidate | Votes | % | ±% |
|---|---|---|---|---|
| Republican | Jacob K. Javits (incumbent) | 3,272,417 | 57.4% | +4.1% |
| Democratic | James B. Donovan | 2,113,772 | 37.0% | −5.5% |
| Liberal | James B. Donovan | 175,551 | 3.1% | −1.2% |
| Total | James B. Donovan | 2,289,323 | 40.14% | N/A |
| Conservative | Kieran O'Doherty | 116,151 | 2.04% | N/A |
| Socialist Workers | Carl Feingold | 17,440 | 0.31% | N/A |
| Socialist Labor | Stephen Emery | 7,786 | 0.14% | N/A |
| Total votes | | 5,703,117 | 100.00% | |
| Republican hold | | | | |

1968 United States Senate election in New York
| Party | Candidate | Votes | % | ±% |
|---|---|---|---|---|
| Republican | Jacob K. Javits (incumbent) | 2,810,836 | | |
| Liberal | Jacob K. Javits (incumbent) | 458,936 | | |
| Total | Jacob K. Javits (incumbent) | 3,269,772 | 49.68% | −7.70% |
| Democratic | Paul O'Dwyer | 2,150,695 | 32.68% | −7.46% |
| Conservative | James Buckley | 1,139,402 | 17.31% | +15.27% |
| Peace and Freedom | Herman Ferguson | 8,775 | 0.13% | +0.13% |
| Socialist Labor | John Emanuel | 7,964 | 0.12% | −0.02% |
| Socialist Workers | Hedda Garza | 4,979 | 0.08% | −0.23% |
| Republican hold | | | | |

1974 United States Senate election in New York
| Party | Candidate | Votes | % | ±% |
|---|---|---|---|---|
| Republican | Jacob K. Javits (incumbent) | 2,098,529 | | |
| Liberal | Jacob K. Javits (incumbent) | 241,659 | | |
| Total | Jacob K. Javits (incumbent) | 2,340,188 | 45.32% | −4.36% |
| Democratic | Ramsey Clark | 1,973,781 | 38.23% | +5.55% |
| Conservative | Barbara A. Keating | 822,584 | 15.93% | −1.38% |
| Socialist Workers | Rebecca Finch | 7,727 | 0.15% | +0.07% |
| American | William F. Dowling | 7,459 | 0.14% | +0.14% |
| Socialist Labor | Robert E. Massi | 4,037 | 0.08% | −0.04% |
| Communist | Mildred Edelman | 3,876 | 0.08% | |
| American Labor | Elijah C. Boyd | 3,798 | 0.07% | +0.07% |
| Republican hold | | Swing | | |

1980 US Senate Republican Primary in New York
| Party | Candidate | Votes | % |
|---|---|---|---|
| Republican | Al D'Amato | 323,468 | 55.68% |
| Republican | Jacob Javits (incumbent) | 257,433 | 44.32% |
| Total votes | | 580,901 | 100.00% |

General election results
| Party | Candidate | Votes | % | ±% |
|---|---|---|---|---|
| Republican | Al D'Amato | 2,272,082 | 37.8% | |
| Conservative | Al D'Amato | 275,100 | 4.6% | −11.4% |
| Right to Life | Al D'Amato | 152,470 | 2.5% | N/A |
| Total | Al D'Amato | 2,699,652 | 44.9% | N/A |
| Democratic | Elizabeth Holtzman | 2,618,661 | 43.5% | +5.3% |
| Liberal | Jacob Javits (incumbent) | 664,544 | 11.1% | |
| Libertarian | Richard Savadel | 21,465 | 0.4% | N/A |
| Communist | William R. Scott | 4,161 | 0.07% | ▼0.01 |
| Workers World | Thomas Soto | 3,643 | 0.06% | |
| Socialist Workers | Victor A. Nieto | 2,715 | 0.05% | ▼0.10 |
| Write-in | | 73 | 0.00% | |
| Majority | | 80,991 | 1.34% | |
| Total votes | | 6,014,914 | 100.00% | |
| Republican hold | | Swing | | |

== See also ==
- List of Jewish American jurists
- List of Jewish members of the United States Congress

== Sources ==
- United States Congress. "Jacob Javits (id: J000064)". Biographical Directory of the United States Congress.
- Kahn, E. J. Jr. (January 21, 1950). "The gentleman from New York - I". Profiles. The New Yorker. Vol. 25, no. 48. pp. 31–45.
- — (January 28, 1950). "The gentleman from New York - II". Profiles. The New Yorker. Vol. 25, no. 49. pp. 30–42.
- Who's Who in America, 1966–1967
- Javits, Jacob K., with Steinberg, Rafael. Javits: The Autobiography of a Public Man. Boston: Houghton Mifflin (1981).

Party political offices
| Preceded by Nathaniel L. Goldstein | Republican nominee for Attorney General of New York; 1954 | Succeeded by Louis J. Lefkowitz |
| Preceded by Joe R. Hanley | Republican nominee for U.S. Senator from New York (Class 3); 1956, 1962, 1968, 1974 | Succeeded by Al D'Amato |
| Preceded by James B. Donovan | Liberal nominee for U.S. Senator from New York (Class 3); 1968, 1974, 1980 | Succeeded by John S. Dyson |
U.S. House of Representatives
| Preceded by James H. Torrens | Member of the U.S. House of Representatives from New York's 21st congressional district 1947–1954 | Succeeded by Herbert Zelenko |
Legal offices
| Preceded by Nathaniel L. Goldstein | Attorney General of New York; 1955–1957 | Succeeded by Louis Lefkowitz |
U.S. Senate
| Preceded by Herbert H. Lehman | U.S. senator (Class 3) from New York; 1957–1981; Served alongside: Irving Ives, Kenneth Keating, Robert F. Kennedy, Charles Goodell, James L. Buckley, Daniel Patrick Moynihan | Succeeded by Alfonse M. D'Amato |
| Preceded by Barry Goldwater | Ranking Member of the Senate Labor and Public Welfare Committee; 1965–1979 | Succeeded by Richard Schweiker |
| Preceded by Leverett Saltonstall | Ranking Member of the Senate Small Business Committee; 1967–1977 | Succeeded by Lowell Weicker |
| Preceded by Clifford P. Case | Ranking Member of the Senate Foreign Relations Committee; 1979–1981 | Succeeded by Claiborne Pell |
