= United States Permanent Representative to the Organisation for the Prohibition of Chemical Weapons =

United States diplomatic position

Permanent Representative of the United States to the Organization for the Prohibition of Chemical Weapons
- Seal of the United States Department of State

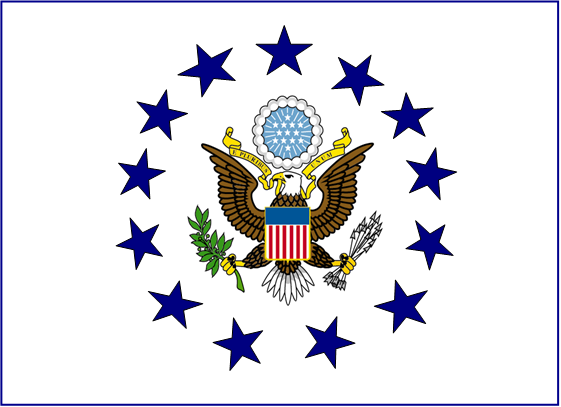
- Flag of a United States chief of mission

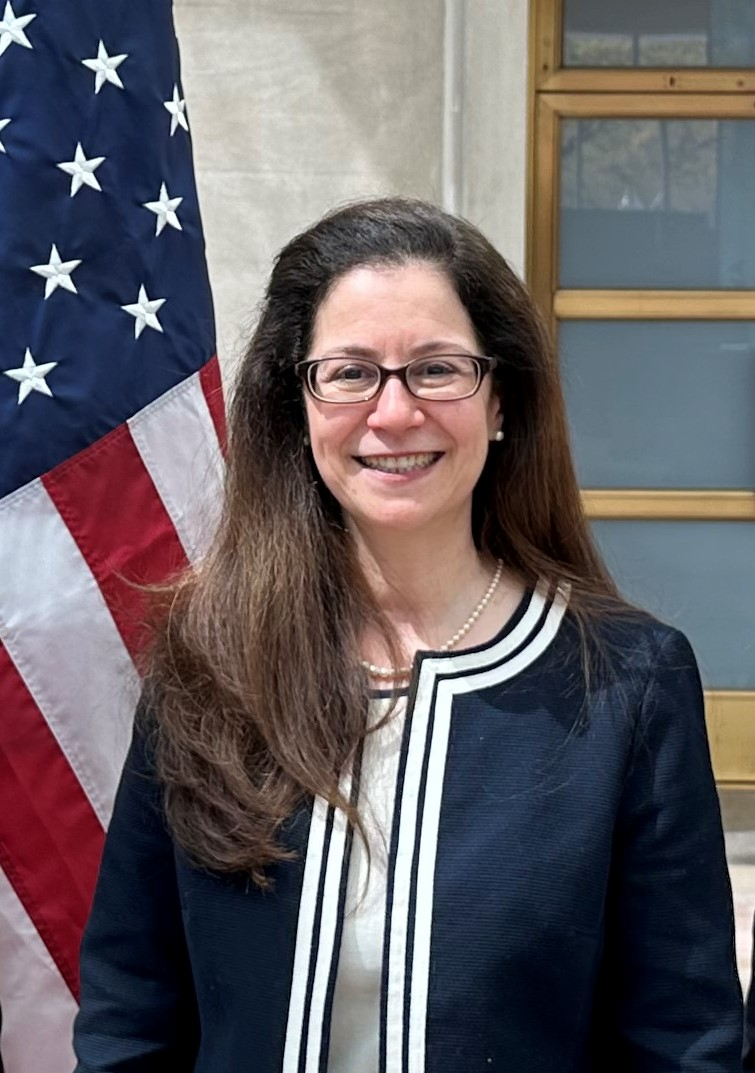
- Incumbent; Nicole Shampaine since April 12, 2024
- Residence: The Hague, Netherlands
- Nominator: The president of the United States
- Appointer: United States Senate
- Inaugural holder: Donald A. Mahley
- Formation: 2000
- Website: nl.usembassy.gov

The United States permanent representative to the Organization for the Prohibition of Chemical Weapons (OPCW) has the rank of ambassador and is based in The Hague, Netherlands, the seat of the OPCW. The current permanent representative is Nicole Shampaine.

Previous permanent representatives:

- Donald A. Mahley was confirmed by the senate and served from 2000 until April 2002.
- Eric M. Javits was confirmed by the senate in April 2003 and served until January 2009. After Ambassador Javits's departure, Robert Mikulak became the United States Representative to the Executive Council in the absence of a permanent representative from January 2009 until November 2010.
- Robert Mikulak was confirmed by the senate in September 2010 and served until July 2015. He presented his credentials on November 29, 2010 to director-general Üzümcü.
- Kenneth D. Ward was confirmed by the U.S. Senate in December 2015 and he presented his credentials to director-general Üzümcü on December 17, 2015.
- Joseph Manso was confirmed by the U.S. Senate in August 2020 and he presented his credentials to director-general Fernando Arias on September 23, 2020 and served from September 23, 2020 until December 29, 2023.
- Nicole Shampaine was confirmed by the U.S. Senate in February 6, 2024 and she presented her credentials to director-general Fernando Arias on April 12, 2024

== See also ==
- Chemical Weapons Convention
- Organisation for the Prohibition of Chemical Weapons
- United States ambassador to the Netherlands
