= 1968 United States Senate election in New York =

- November 5, 1968
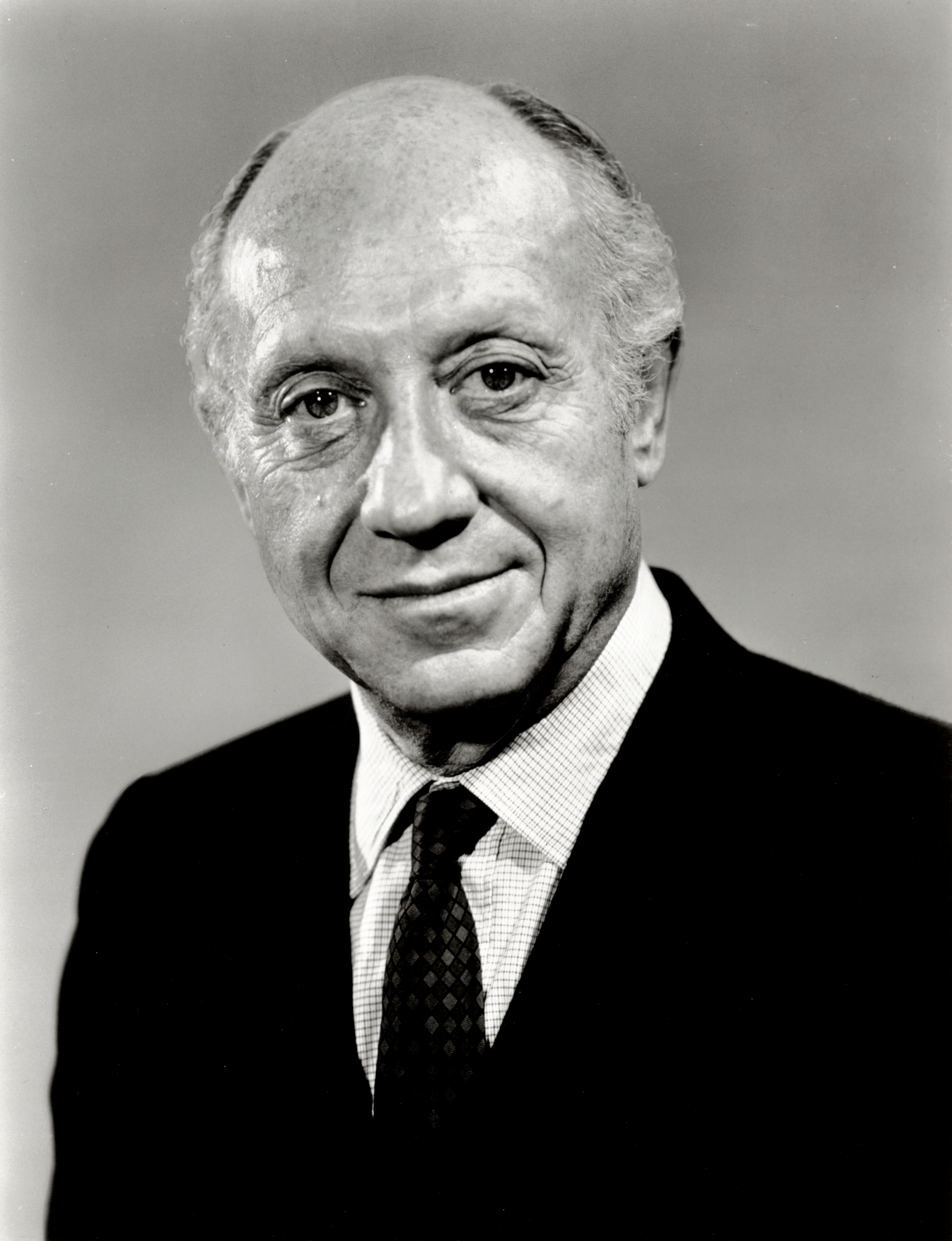

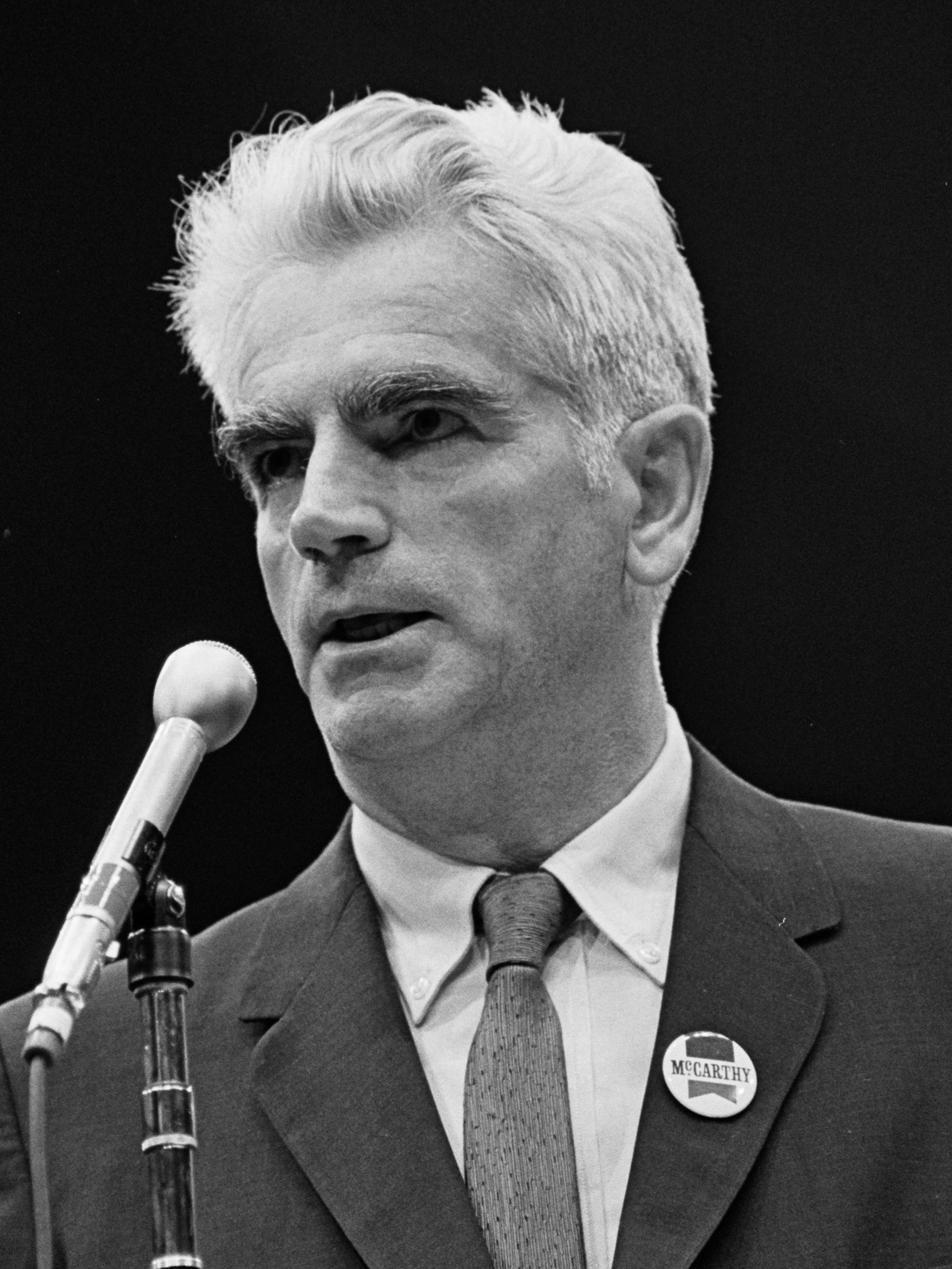

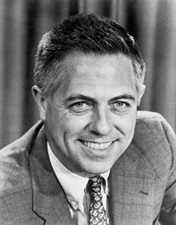
Nominee	Jacob Javits	Paul O'Dwyer	James L. Buckley
Party	Republican	Democratic	Conservative
Alliance	Liberal
Popular vote	3,269,772	2,150,695	1,139,402
Percentage	49.68%	32.68%	17.31%
- County results Javits: 30–40% 40–50% 50–60% 60–70% 70–80% O'Dwyer: 40–50%
U.S. senator before election
Jacob Javits
Republican
Elected U.S. Senator
Jacob Javits
Republican

The 1968 United States Senate election in New York was held on November 5, 1968. Incumbent Republican U.S. Senator Jacob Javits defeated Democratic challenger Paul O'Dwyer and Conservative Party challenger James Buckley in a three-way race.

== Liberal primary ==
=== Candidates ===
- Murray Baron
- Jacob Javits, incumbent U.S. Senator

While Javits did not face any challengers for the Republican nomination, he did face a minor one when seeking the Liberal Party of New York's nomination.

=== Results ===
Liberal Party Primary results
Party	Candidate	Votes	%
Liberal	Jacob K. Javits (incumbent)	10,277	72.14%
Liberal	Murray Baron	3,969	27.86%
Total votes		14,246	100.00%

== Democratic primary ==
=== Candidates ===
- Eugene Nickerson, Nassau County Executive
- Paul O'Dwyer, former New York City Councilman
- Joseph Y. Resnick, U.S. Representative from Ellenville

=== Results ===
Democratic Party Primary results
Party	Candidate	Votes	%
Democratic	Paul O'Dwyer	275,877	36.14%
Democratic	Eugene Nickerson	257,639	33.75%
Democratic	Joseph Y. Resnick	229,893	30.11%
Total votes		763,409	100.00%

== General election ==
=== Candidates ===
- James L. Buckley, attorney, businessman, and brother of William F. Buckley (Conservative)
- John Emanuel (Socialist Labor)
- Hedda Garza (Socialist Workers)
- Herman Ferguson (Peace and Freedom)
- Jacob Javits, incumbent Senator since 1957 (Republican and Liberal)
- Paul O'Dwyer, President of the New York City Council (Democratic)

=== Results ===
General election results
Party	Candidate	Votes	%	±%
Republican	Jacob K. Javits (incumbent)	2,810,836	42.71%	▼14.67
Liberal	Jacob K. Javits (incumbent)	458,936	6.97%	▲3.89
Total	Jacob K. Javits (incumbent)	3,269,772	49.68%	▼7.70
Democratic	Paul O'Dwyer	2,150,695	32.68%	▼7.46
Conservative	James Buckley	1,139,402	17.31%	▲15.27
Peace and Freedom	Herman Ferguson	8,775	0.13%	▲0.13
Socialist Labor	John Emanuel	7,964	0.12%	▼0.02
Socialist Workers	Hedda Garza	4,979	0.08%	▼0.23
Total votes		6,581,587	100.00%	

== See also ==
- 1968 United States Senate elections
