= Eric M. Javits =

American diplomat

United States Permanent Representative to the Organisation for the Prohibition of Chemical Weapons
- In office 2003–2009
- President: George W. Bush

U.S. Representative to the Conference on Disarmament
- In office 2001–2003
- President: George W. Bush

Personal details
- Born: 24 May 1931 (age 94)
- Relations: Jacob Javits (uncle)
- Education: Stanford University; Columbia University (BA, JD)

Eric M. Javits (born 24 May 1931) is an American diplomat who served as the Ambassador and Permanent U.S. Representative to the Conference on Disarmament in Geneva from 2001 to 2003 and the United States Permanent Representative to the Organisation for the Prohibition of Chemical Weapons from 2003 to 2009. He is a member of the Council of American Ambassadors.

Javits grew up in Connecticut and is a nephew of former U.S. Senator, Jacob Javits (R-NY). His father, Benjamin Javits, was an attorney, philanthropist, and author and was brother to the late Senator Javits. He graduated from the Choate School in 1948 and then spent one year at Stanford University in California. He transferred to Columbia College and graduated Phi Beta Kappa in 1952. He attended Columbia Law School and graduated in 1955.

He began his legal career with Javits & Javits, the New York law firm founded by his father and his uncle. He conducted international practice as a partner in the firm from 1964 to 1989, when he left the practice of law to serve as a consultant in the U.S. Department of State. He was nominated to be the United States Ambassador to Venezuela on July 11, 1989, but the confirmation was delayed because the New York lawyer has been subpoenaed in connection with a Securities and Exchange Commission investigation. He later withdrew the nomination on June 26, 1990.

Javits served as the president of Queen Sofía Spanish Institute from 1981 to 1987. He was also named chairman in 1987. He was twice conferred the Order of Isabella the Catholic by King Juan Carlos of Spain for his work in promoting Spanish culture.
