= 1981 Brooklyn County District Attorney election =

Local election in New York City

- November 3, 1981
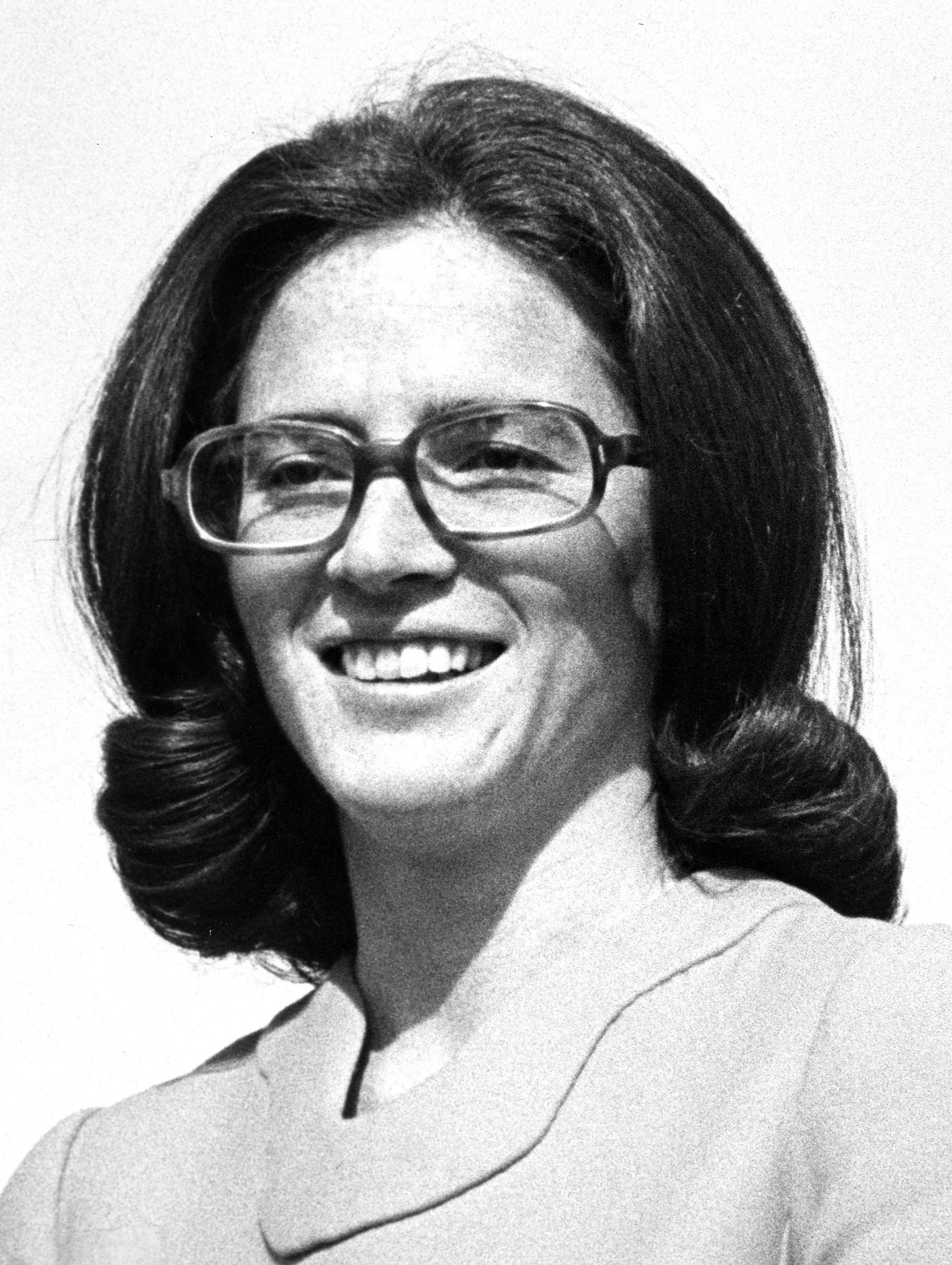
Candidate	Elizabeth Holtzman	Norman Rosen	Brendan Connolly
Party	Democratic	Republican	Conservative
Alliance	Liberal		Right to Life
Popular vote	209,651	86,624	17,278
Percentage	66.86%	27.51%	5.51%
District Attorney before election
Eugene Gold
Democratic
Elected District Attorney
Elizabeth Holtzman
Democratic

An election for Brooklyn District Attorney was held on November 3, 1981. Elizabeth Holtzman, a former member of the United States House of Representatives, defeated Norman Rosen, the executive assistant to the sitting district attorney, in both the Democratic primary and general election.

Eugene Gold, who was first elected as district attorney in 1968, declined to seek reelection and endorsed Rosen. Rosen was supported by Ed Koch and the Brooklyn Democratic Party and outspent Holtzman, but lost due to Holtzman's strong support among black voters. In the general election, Rosen was again defeated as the Republican nominee.

== Background ==
Eugene Gold was elected Brooklyn District Attorney in 1968, and reelected with Republican support in 1973 and 1977. He oversaw the third-largest district attorney office in the United States. On May 28, 1981, he announced that he would not seek reelection and that he would instead work on improving Israel–United States relations.

== Nominations ==
=== Democratic ===
Candidates

- Elizabeth Holtzman, member of the United States House of Representatives from New York's 16th congressional district
- Norman Rosen, executive assistant to Eugene Gold

Did not run

- Robert Aiello, assistant district attorney
- Jerome Becker, criminal court judge
- Jerome Karp, president of the Kings County Criminal Bar Association
- Philip Kaplan, president of the District 15 School Board
- Leonard Skolnik, member of the New York Supreme Court

On the day Gold announced he would not run, he endorsed his executive assistant Norman Rosen, who had worked for him for 13 years, to succeed him. Rosen's campaign was coordinated by Thomas Davide and managed by Walter Diamond. Rosen was supported by Mayor Ed Koch and Brooklyn's Democratic political machine. Koch claimed that he would not support any candidate, but endorsed Rosen on four days before the primary.

The Kings County Democratic Coalition wanted Elizabeth Holtzman to run and she gave them permission to circulate petitions for her, but declined to state whether she would run. Holtzman launched her campaign on July 22.

During the campaign, Rosen ran a radio commercial that stated, "Liz Holtzman, she's a nice girl; maybe I'd like to have her as a daughter, but not as a DA." Holtzman and Rosen participated in a debate on August 21, and aired by WNBC on August 23. By September, Rosen raised $228,603, with a $50,000 loan from Fredrick DeMatteis and another $50,000 loan from assemblyman Joseph Martuscello, while Holtzman raised $145,837.

Between 8 p.m. and 9 a.m. September 20 to 21, people broke into Rosen's campaign office. 9 telephone units worth a combined $4,500, 2 IBM Selective typewriter worth $2,000, and a $75 loudspeaker microphone were stolen. Davide claimed that the theft was "a case of political sabotage", but Rosen clarified that he was not accusing Holtzman or her supporters of having conducted it.

The primary was initially scheduled for September 10, but was pushed back to September 22, due to a court ruling on September 8, regarding the redistricting of the New York City Council. Holtzman won the nomination due to strong support from black voters, winning 74% in black-majority areas. Assemblyman Albert Vann was credited with gaining this support for Holtzman. Rosen spent $400,000 compared to Holtzman's $250,000.

=== Others ===
The Republicans selected Aaron Schechter and the Liberals selected Herbert Dicker, chair of the party in Brooklyn, as their respective paper candidates. These candidates were replaced as the Republican line was given to Rosen and the Liberal line given to Holtzman. Brendan Connolly received the nominations of the Conservative and Right to Life parties.

== General ==
Koch switched his support to Holtzman for the general election. Fred Pantaleone, the chair of the Brooklyn Republicans, hoped that Rosen would become the first person to win the district attorney election as a Republican in decades.

Holtzman spent $60,000 during the general election. Her election made her first female district attorney in New York City and the second in New York State. After losing the election Rosen was appointed to the Queens County District Attorney's office by John J. Santucci.

== Results ==
1981 Brooklyn County District Attorney election
Party	Candidate	Votes	%
Democratic	Elizabeth Holtzman	197,200	62.89%
Liberal	Elizabeth Holtzman	12,451	3.97%
Total	Elizabeth Holtzman	209,651	66.86%
Republican	Norman Rosen	86,624	27.51%
Conservative	Brendan Connolly	10,280	3.28%
Right to Life	Brendan Connolly	6,998	2.23%
Total	Brendan Connolly	17,278	5.51%
Total votes		313,553	100.00%

== Endorsements ==
Elizabeth Holtzman endorsements

Federal officials

- Benjamin Civiletti, 73rd United States Attorney General (1979–1981)

State officials

- Robert Abrams, 60th Attorney General of New York (1979–1993)

Local officials

- Ed Koch, 105th Mayor of New York City (1978–1989) (general)

Newspapers

- New York Amsterdam News

Notable individuals

- Richard Ben-Veniste, special prosecutor for the Watergate scandal
- Samuel Dash, chief counsel for United States Senate Watergate Committee
Norman Rosen endorsements

Local officials

- Michael F. Armstrong, 38th Queens County District Attorney (1973)
- Eugene Gold, Brooklyn District Attorney (1969–1981)
- Charles J. Hynes, 24th New York City Fire Commissioner (1980–1982)
- ~~Ed Koch, 105th Mayor of New York City (1978–1989)~~ (Switched to Holtzman)

Notable individuals

- Phil Caruso, president of the Police Benevolent Association of the City of New York

Organizations

- Brooklyn Democratic Party
- Detectives' Endowment Association

== Works cited ==
=== Books ===
- Conway, Jill; Bourque, Susan (1989). Learning About Women: Gender, Politics, & Power. Ann Arbor, Michigan: University of Michigan Press. ISBN 978-0-472-06398-7.
- Le Veness, Frank; Sweeney, Jane (1987). Women Leaders in Contemporary U.S. Politics. Boulder, Colorado: Lynne Rienner Publishers. doi:10.1515/9781685859480. ISBN 978-0-931477-87-4.

=== Newspapers ===
- "At long last, primary day". The Daily Item. September 22, 1981. p. A1 – via Newspapers.com.
- "Elizabeth Holtzman has easy win in Brooklyn D.A. race". Staten Island Advance. November 4, 1981. p. B8 – via Newspapers.com.
- "Gold Is The Victor In Brooklyn DA Race". New York Daily News. November 6, 1968. p. 7 – via Newspapers.com.
- "Holtzman Candidacy Draws Fire". Newsday. August 13, 1981. p. Q7 – via Newspapers.com.
- "Holtzman Runs To Her Own Beat". Newsday. September 6, 1989. p. 27. Archived from the original on June 11, 2022 – via Newspapers.com.
- "Libs' man steps down so Liz can run". New York Daily News. July 28, 1981. p. 9 – via Newspapers.com.
- "New Yorkers finally get chance to vote". The Herald Statesman. September 22, 1981. p. 1. Archived from the original on June 11, 2022 – via Newspapers.com.
- "Primary Winners Exult As Losers Map Strategy". Newsday. September 24, 1981. p. 25 – via Newspapers.com.
- "Santucci Shakes Up Staff". New York Daily News. December 27, 1981. p. B2 – via Newspapers.com.
- Benedetto, Richard (September 24, 1981). "Koch, Holtzman now in kingmaker roles". Democrat and Chronicle. p. 10A – via Newspapers.com.
- Collins, Dan (September 23, 1981). "Holtzman carries minority vote". Staten Island Advance. p. A3 – via Newspapers.com.
- Fitzgerald, Owen (July 29, 1981). "Everything's comin' up Rosen in DA race". New York Daily News. p. K3 – via Newspapers.com.
- Fitzgerald, Owen (July 22, 1981). "Liz Holtzman in running for Brooklyn DA". New York Daily News. p. 7 – via Newspapers.com.
- Harney, James; Lieberman, Mark (September 22, 1981). "Rosen aides tie break-in to 'dirty tricks'". New York Daily News. p. K1 – via Newspapers.com.
- Hays, Daniel (May 28, 1981). "B'klyn DA Gold won't seek reelection". New York Daily News. p. 7 – via Newspapers.com.
- Herbert, Bob (October 6, 1981). "River Walk firm gave Koch campaign 1.6G". New York Daily News. p. 22 – via Newspapers.com.
- Kaner, Walter (May 27, 1981). "Hope, Eden lead a better show". New York Daily News. p. XQ11 – via Newspapers.com.
- Kempton, Murray (September 25, 1981). "Prince Charming Of the Primaries And His Fatal Flaw". Newsday. p. 69 – via Newspapers.com.
- Lieberman, Mark (August 5, 1981). "10 union chiefs back Rosen for DA". New York Daily News. p. K3 – via Newspapers.com.
- Lieberman, Mark; McLaughlin, John; Medina, David (August 28, 1981). "Barbaro: Ed backers got 60M in tax breaks". New York Daily News. p. 27 – via Newspapers.com.
- Lieberman, Mark (September 30, 1981). "Conservatives ready to pick a candidate for DiCarlo seat". New York Daily News. p. K10 – via Newspapers.com.
- Lieberman, Mark (November 19, 1981). "Elections Board tally: Bellamy draws Dems". New York Daily News. p. K26 – via Newspapers.com.
- Lieberman, Mark (June 3, 1981). "Gold's departure may start a primary fight among Dems". New York Daily News. p. K4 – via Newspapers.com.
- Lieberman, Mark (September 2, 1981). "Holtzman and Rosen differ on DA's record". New York Daily News. p. K3 – via Newspapers.com.
- Lieberman, Mark (September 10, 1981). "Primary delay may add new twists to contests". New York Daily News. p. K3 – via Newspapers.com.
- Lieberman, Mark (December 30, 1981). "Primary, district rulings may trigger changes in '82". New York Daily News. p. K4 – via Newspapers.com.
- Lieberman, Mark (June 17, 1981). "Reform Dems tap Liz for DA, set stage for heated primary". New York Daily News. p. K5 – via Newspapers.com.
- Lieberman, Mark (August 13, 1981). "Rivals for DA post count their blessings". New York Daily News. p. K3 – via Newspapers.com.
- Lieberman, Mark (August 24, 1981). "Rosen and Holtzman trade verbal slugs". New York Daily News. p. K1 – via Newspapers.com.
- Lieberman, Mark (June 9, 1981). "Rosen officially gets Dem nod in race for DA". New York Daily News. p. K3 – via Newspapers.com.
- Lieberman, Mark (November 1, 1981). "The excitement's not on ballot". New York Daily News. p. B1 – via Newspapers.com.
- McLaughlin, John (November 8, 1983). "Victory: More black voters". The Daily Times. p. 8. Archived from the original on June 11, 2022 – via Newspapers.com.
- Melia, John (August 3, 1981). "Detectives back Rosen for B'klyn DA". New York Daily News. p. 10 – via Newspapers.com.
- Toscano, John (November 1, 1981). "Liz takes a powder in debate with Rosen". New York Daily News. p. B5 – via Newspapers.com.
