= 1956 United States Senate election in New York =

- November 6, 1956
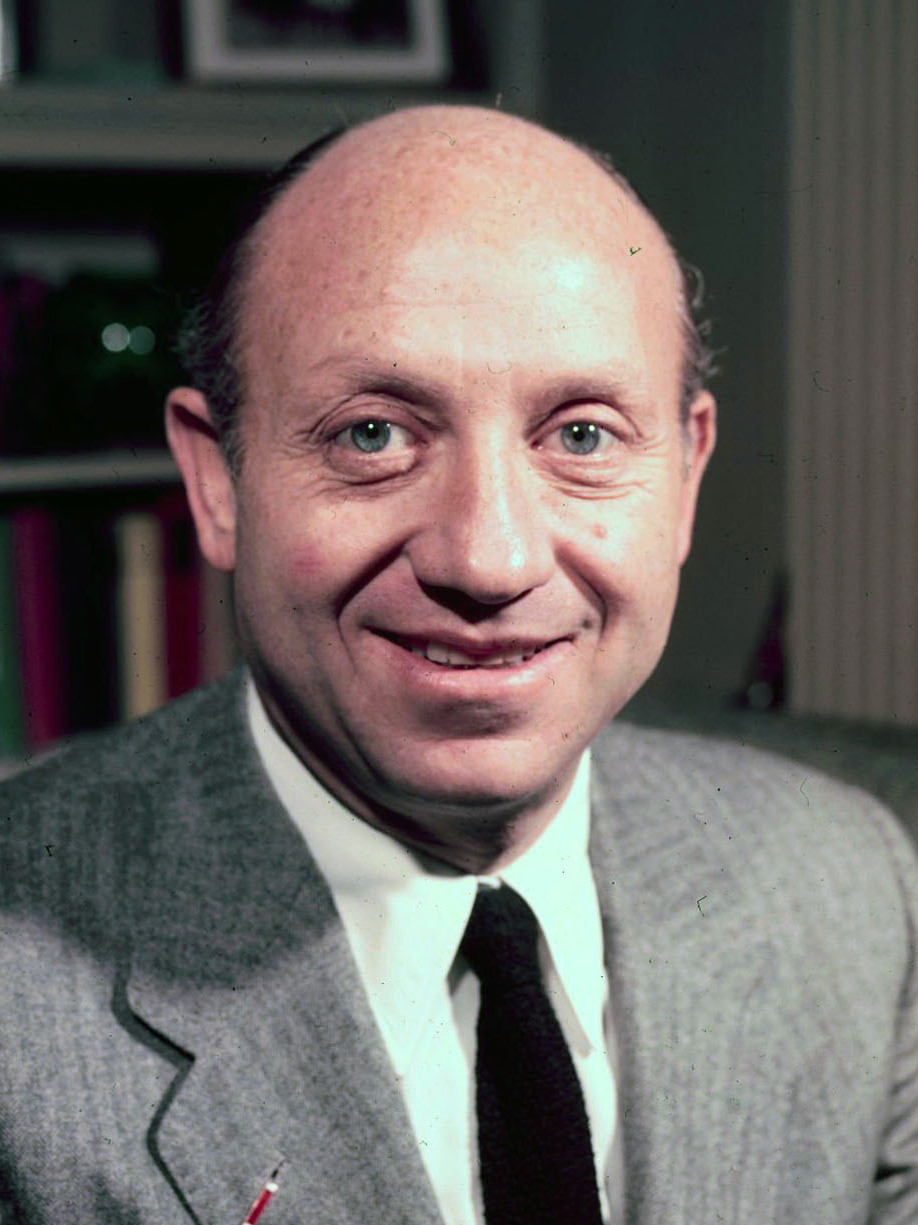

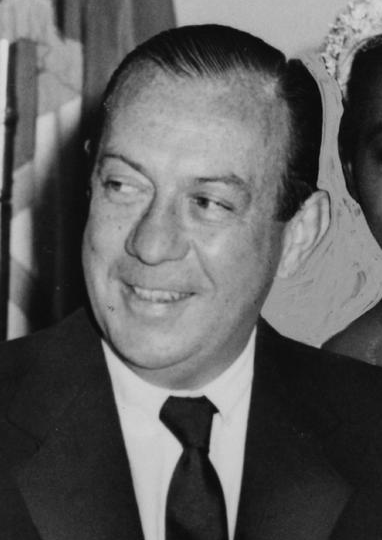
Nominee	Jacob Javits	Robert F. Wagner Jr.
Party	Republican	Democratic
Alliance		Liberal
Popular vote	3,723,933	3,265,159
Percentage	53.27%	46.71%
- County results Javits: 50–60% 60–70% 70–80% Wagner: 50–60% 60–70%
U.S. senator before election
Herbert H. Lehman
Democratic
Elected U.S. Senator
Jacob Javits
Republican

The United States Senate election of 1956 in New York was held on November 6, 1956. Incumbent Senator Herbert H. Lehman retired after one full term in the Senate. Republican Attorney General of New York Jacob K. Javits defeated Mayor of New York City Robert F. Wagner Jr. to win the open seat.

The major parties met on September 10 in Albany and nominated Javits and Wagner unanimously, though not without some pre-convention campaigning.

== Background ==
Incumbent Senator Herbert H. Lehman decided against seeking re-election at the age of 78.

== Democratic nomination ==
=== Candidates ===
- Emanuel Celler, U.S. Representative from Brooklyn
- Robert F. Wagner Jr., Mayor of New York City

=== Campaign ===
Several candidates put their name forward for the Democratic nomination. Representative Emanuel Celler expressed his willingness to "make the ascent," citing his long service in the House as a "stepping stone."

Eventually, the party was able to persuade Robert F. Wagner Jr. to run, and the field was cleared for him.

=== Convention ===
The Democratic state convention met on September 10 at Albany and nominated Mayor of New York City Robert F. Wagner Jr. by acclamation.

== Republican nomination ==
=== Candidates ===
- Jacob Javits, Attorney General of New York and former U.S. Representative from Washington Heights
- J. Raymond McGovern, former Comptroller of New York and State Senator from New Rochelle

==== Declined ====
- Dean Alfange, American Labor Party nominee for Governor in 1942
- Thomas E. Dewey, former Governor of New York and nominee for president in 1944 and 1948
- Douglas MacArthur, former General of the United States Army

=== Campaign ===
Jacob Javits began his campaign for the Republican nomination as early as 1954, almost immediately upon taking office as Attorney General. He openly solicited support from key leaders around the state, going around his party to do so. In essence, he was able to wall off the nomination before another strong candidate could challenge him.

During the pre-convention campaign, Javits was criticized by fellow Republicans for being soft on communism, particularly during his time in Congress. He voted against the Mundt-Nixon Bill, which would have required registration of Communist Party members, and was one of only 10 Representatives to vote against a wiretap bill sponsored by his New York colleague Kenneth Keating. In September, he testified before the Senate Internal Security Subcommittee to "clear his name" regarding rumors linking him personally to the Communist Party, including ex-communist Bella Dodd's testimony that she had guided Javits's early political career. He testified that he had "no connections" to Communists and that his House record was "effectively anti-Communist." Though he admitted he had met with Dodd in 1946, he said he had not known she was a Communist Party activist. He had in fact voted for a number of measures opposed by communists, primarily on international affairs and national security, including the Marshall Plan, aid to Greece, Turkey, and Korea, extension of the draft, and appropriations for national defense.

Javits also faced criticism for his liberalism more generally, especially on those occasions when he opposed the Eisenhower administration. In the 81st Congress, he voted with his party only 27 percent of the time. During the 82nd Congress, when Republicans were returned to the minority, he voted the Republican line only 15 percent of the time versus 80 percent for the average Republican. He voted in favor of public housing, expansion of the Tennessee Valley Authority, state ownership of the Niagara power plant, and federal consumer and industrial regulations. He voted against the Taft-Hartley Act and the Immigration and Nationality Act of 1952. Because of Javits's tendency to break from the party, some Republicans hoped to engineer the nomination of former Governor Thomas E. Dewey or Herbert Brownell instead. Most, however, feared that nominating a less popular candidate would harm President Eisenhower's chances in New York.

Most of the criticism of Javits came from upstate New York and eventually settled on J. Raymond McGovern, the former state Comptroller, as its standard-bearer. Two far stronger candidates, Governor Dewey and Douglas MacArthur, declined to back movements to draft them as candidates, though Dewey's denial was far more emphatic. A third candidate, Dean Alfange, withdrew after finding little support among delegates.

=== Convention ===
By the time the convention arrived on September 10, Javits had withstood most of the criticism against him and an alternative had failed to emerge. In a crucial private meeting before the convention, the executive committee of the party endorsed Javits by a vote of 17 to 8 for McGovern. Failed attempts were made to present Dewey or MacArthur as alternatives. Discussion of Javits's alleged ties to communists were discussed, but the committee members agreed that Javits had acquitted himself well before the Senate subcommittee. Supporters on the committee argued that any losses upstate would be made up by gains in New York City.

The vote was then made formally unanimous, with the dissenters agreeing not to publicly criticize Javits or allow their names to be used. Javits appeared before the committee to accept the nomination.

The convention met on September 10 and nominated Javits unanimously. McGovern gave the nominating speech for Javits, having bowed out upon realization that he could not win.

== Liberal nomination ==
The Liberal Party endorsed Wagner, the Democratic nominee, for Senate.

== General election ==
=== Campaign ===
With two New York City candidates, the campaign was expected to center on the city, with upstate New York taking a back seat.

On October 1, a movement was launched to vote for General of the Army Douglas MacArthur as a write-in candidate. On October 2, MacArthur disavowed the campaign and stated that he was not a candidate.

=== Results ===
1956 United States Senate election in New York
Party	Candidate	Votes	%
Republican	Jacob K. Javits	3,723,933	53.27%
Democratic	Robert F. Wagner Jr.	2,964,511	42.42%
Liberal	Robert F. Wagner Jr.	300,648	4.30%
Total	Robert F. Wagner, Jr.	3,265,159	46.71%
Write-in	Douglas MacArthur	1,312	0.02%
Total votes		6,990,404	100.00%

== Sources ==
- Official result: STATE ELECTORS TO VOTE MONDAY; But Harriman Will Not Hold Reception for Republicans; Final Tally Listed; Dewey Held Receptions; 4.3 Million for Eisenhower in NYT on December 11, 1956 (subscription required)

== See also ==
- New York state elections
- 1956 United States presidential election
- 1956 United States Senate elections
