= Robert F. Wagner Jr. =

American diplomat and politician (1910–1991)

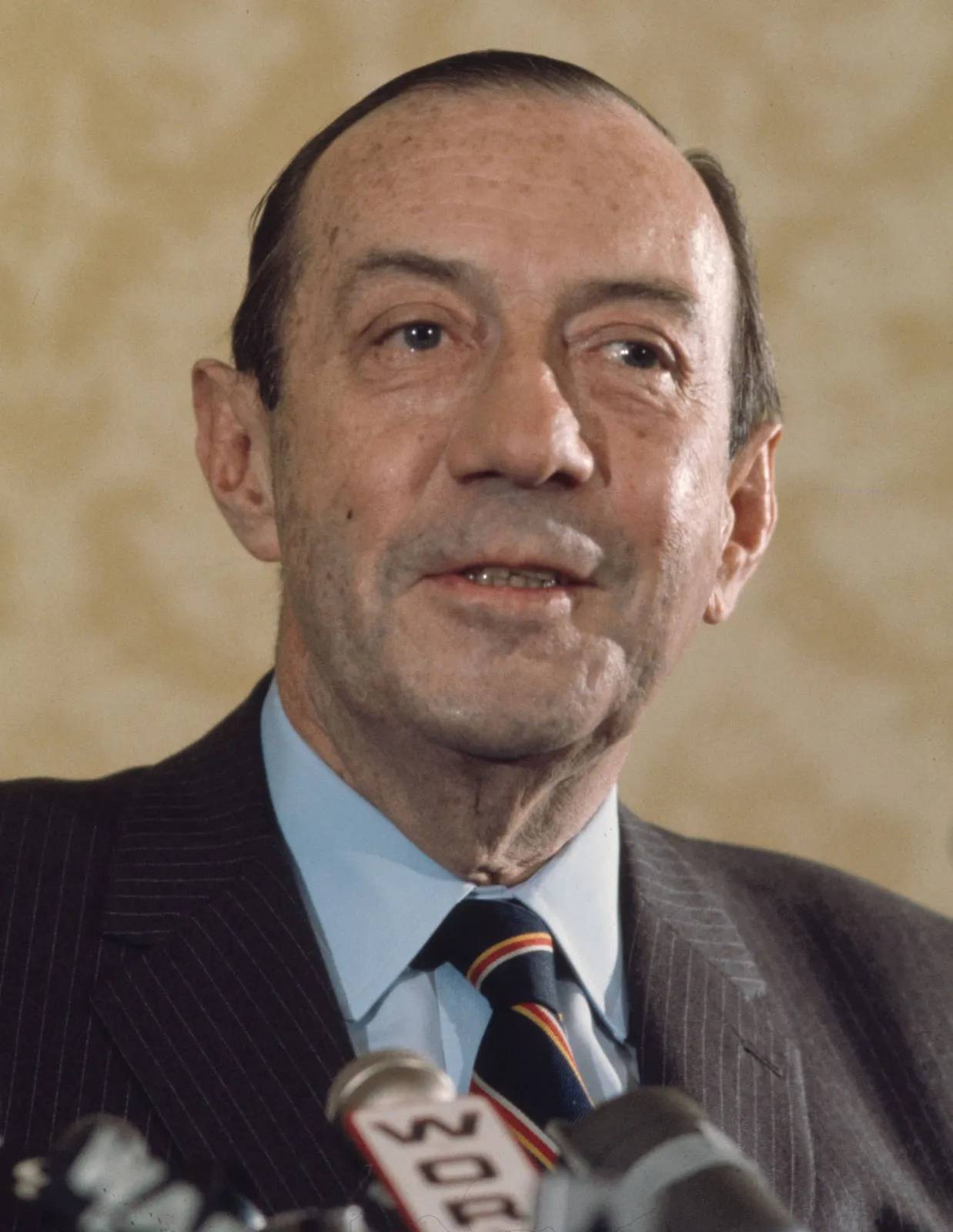
- Wagner c. 1970

Personal Representative of the President to the Holy See
- In office November 28, 1978 – January 16, 1981
- President: Jimmy Carter
- Preceded by: David M. Walters
- Succeeded by: William A. Wilson

52nd United States Ambassador to Spain
- In office June 24, 1968 – March 7, 1969
- President: Lyndon B. Johnson; Richard Nixon
- Preceded by: Angier Biddle Duke
- Succeeded by: Robert C. Hill

103rd Mayor of New York City
- In office January 1, 1954 – December 31, 1965
- Preceded by: Vincent R. Impellitteri
- Succeeded by: John Lindsay

14th President of the United States Conference of Mayors
- In office 1957–1958
- Preceded by: John Hynes
- Succeeded by: Norris Poulson

28th President of the National League of Cities
- In office 1955–1956
- Preceded by: Allen C. Thompson
- Succeeded by: Ben West

17th Borough President of Manhattan
- In office January 1, 1950 – December 31, 1953
- Preceded by: Hugo Rogers
- Succeeded by: Hulan Jack

Member of the New York State Assembly from the 16th New York district
- In office January 1, 1938 – January 13, 1942
- Preceded by: William Schwartz
- Succeeded by: John P. Morrissey

Personal details
- Born: Robert Ferdinand Wagner II; April 20, 1910 New York City, U.S.
- Died: February 12, 1991 (aged 80) New York City, U.S.
- Party: Democratic
- Spouses: Susan Edwards (m. 1942; died 1964) Barbara Cavanagh (m. 1965; div. 1971) Phyllis Fraser (m. 1975)
- Children: 2, including Robert III
- Relatives: Robert F. Wagner (father)

Military service
- Allegiance: United States
- Branch/service: United States Army
- Years of service: 1942-1945
- Unit: United States Army Air Corps
- Battles/wars: World War II

Robert Ferdinand Wagner II (April 20, 1910 – February 12, 1991) was an American diplomat and politician who served three terms as mayor of New York City, from 1954 to 1965. When running for his third term, he broke with the Tammany Hall leadership, ending the clubhouse's reign in city politics. He also served as United States Ambassador to Spain and in a number of other offices.

== Early life and career ==
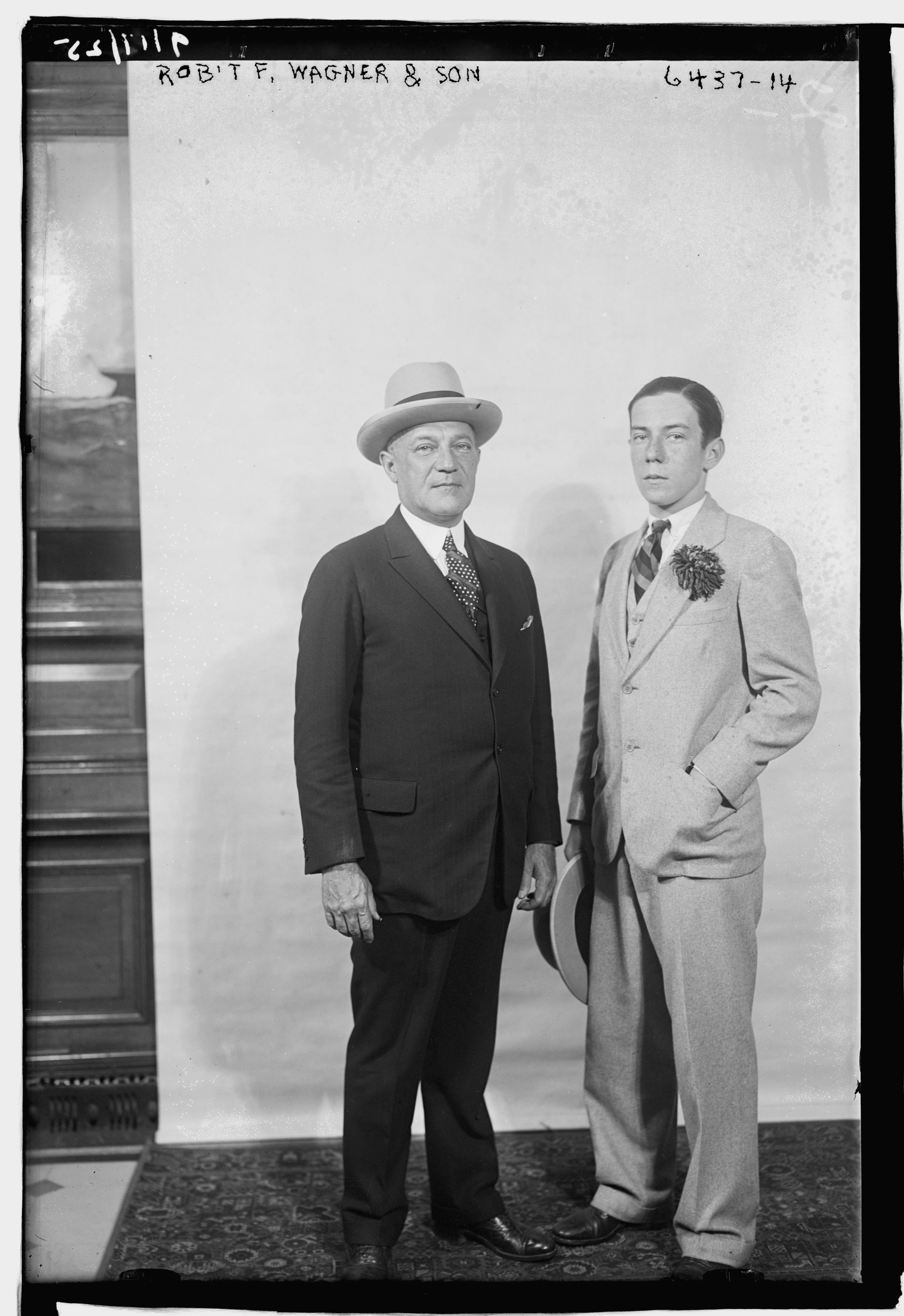
Wagner with his father Robert Sr., 1925

Wagner was born in Yorkville, Manhattan, the son of Margaret Marie (McTague) and German-born United States Senator Robert Ferdinand Wagner. He attended Taft School and graduated from Yale University in 1933, where he was on the business staff of campus humor magazine The Yale Record and became a member of Scroll and Key (as was John Lindsay, his successor as mayor). He attended Harvard Business School and the Graduate School of International Studies in Geneva. He graduated from Yale Law School in 1937.

Wagner was a member of the New York State Assembly (New York Co., 16th D.) in 1938, 1939–40 and 1941–42. He resigned on January 13, 1942, and joined the Army Air Corps to fight in World War II, where he served as an intelligence officer. Wagner held the rank of lieutenant colonel with the 19th Tactical Air Command and was awarded a Bronze Star Medal. After the war, he served as city tax commissioner, commissioner of housing and buildings, and chairman of the City Planning Commission. He was Borough President of Manhattan from 1950 to 1953. He also served as delegate to numerous Democratic conventions and was the Democratic nominee for the U.S. Senate in 1956.

== Mayor ==
New York City Comptroller Lazarus Joseph usually sided in the New York City Board of Estimate with Mayor Vincent R. Impellitteri during Impelliterri's term in office but supported Wagner for the Democratic nomination for mayor in the 1953 primary election, calling him a "sure winner".

Wagner's nomination and election as New York City mayor in 1953 caused a rift in the Democratic Party and instigated a long-standing feud between Eleanor Roosevelt and Carmine DeSapio, Boss of Tammany Hall. Roosevelt was a Wagner supporter and DeSapio supported Wagner reluctantly until 1961, when Wagner ran for a third term on an anti-Tammany platform, which eventually helped end DeSapio's leadership.

During Wagner's mayoralty, he built public housing and schools, created the City University of New York system, established the right of collective bargaining for city employees, and barred housing discrimination based on race, creed, or color. He was the first mayor to hire many people of color in city government. His administration also saw the development of Lincoln Center and brought Shakespeare to Central Park. In 1957, after the Dodgers and Giants left New York City, he appointed a commission to determine whether New York City could host another National League baseball team, eventually leading to the Mets franchise being awarded to New York City.

During Wagner's mayoralty, the city was visited by several notables from around the world. In January 1957, President Dwight D. Eisenhower invited King Saud of Saudi Arabia to the U.S. to discuss strategies for resolving the Suez Crisis. Wagner refused Eisenhower's request of a ticker-tape parade for the king and refused to greet him formally, saying that the king was anti-Jewish and anti-Catholic, which some observers saw as "a crude appeal to the prejudices of the hyphenated voters". He did greet Queen Elizabeth II later in 1957. He also rearranged his schedule to meet with the Little Rock Nine and give them a tour of New York City Hall.

In 1956, Wagner ran on the Democratic and Liberal tickets for U.S. Senator from New York, but lost to Republican nominee Jacob Javits. In 1957 and 1958, Wagner served as president of the United States Conference of Mayors.

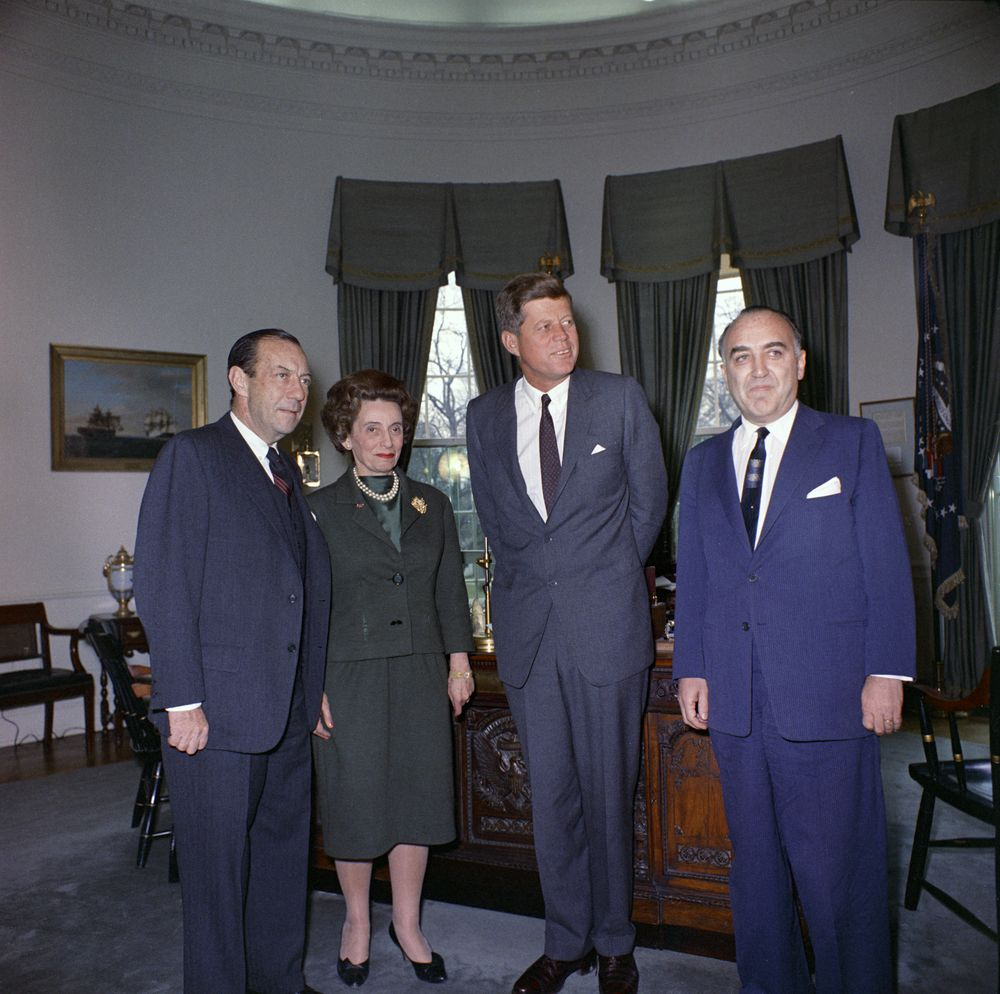
Wagner meets with president John F. Kennedy in the Oval Office, 1962

Like his father, Wagner was aligned with Tammany Hall for much of his career. But when he sought a third term in 1961, Wagner broke with DeSapio and won the Democratic primary anyway, beginning the decline of machine politics in New York City.

By the early 1960s, Wagner became concerned about New York City's image in preparation for the 1964 World's Fair and began a controversial campaign to rid New York City of gay bars. The city revoked the bars' liquor licenses and used undercover police officers to entrap as many gay men as possible.

In February 1962, Wagner quit the New York Athletic Club because it barred African Americans and Jews from membership.

The New York Preservation Archive Project has called Wagner's contribution to preservation "complex". He saved Carnegie Hall from demolition in 1960, but was also mayor when the original Penn Station was demolished, beginning on October 28, 1963. In 1965, Wagner signed the law that created the New York City Landmarks Preservation Commission.

In 1965, Wagner decided not to run for a fourth term. In 1969, he ran for mayor again, but lost the Democratic primary. In 1973, he talked with the city's five Republican county chairmen about running for mayor as a Republican, but the negotiations collapsed.

A 1993 survey of historians, political scientists, and urban experts by Melvin G. Holli of the University of Illinois at Chicago ranked Wagner the 17th-best American big-city mayor to have served between 1820 and 1993.

== Ambassador ==
After deciding not to run for a fourth term in 1965, Wagner served as ambassador to Spain from June 1968 to March 1969. In 1969, he ran for a fourth term but decisively lost the Democratic primary to Mario Procaccino. He also briefly ran in 1973, but withdrew before the primary. In 1978, President Jimmy Carter appointed Wagner as his representative to the Vatican, where the College of Cardinals had recently elected John Paul II.

== Personal life ==
Wagner was a Roman Catholic.

Wagner's first wife was Susan Edwards, by whom he had two sons, Robert Ferdinand Wagner III and Duncan. Susan died of lung cancer in 1964. By all accounts, their marriage was very happy, and although Susan was not particularly fond of politics, she enjoyed traveling with her husband and meeting famous people. Susan has been called optimistic, cheerful, kind, and always happy. According to his friends, Wagner was "lonely and depressed" after her death.

In 1965, Wagner married Barbara Cavanagh. They divorced in 1971. In 1975, Wagner married Phyllis Fraser, widow of Bennett Cerf. They lived together until his death in 1991. Her five-floor townhouse at 132 East 62nd Street, designed by Denning & Fourcade, "was so magnetic that the statesman moved in".

== Death and legacy ==
Wagner died in Manhattan of heart failure in 1991, aged 80, while being treated for bladder cancer. His funeral mass was offered by Cardinal William Wakefield Baum at St. Patrick's Cathedral, and he was buried at Calvary Cemetery in Maspeth, Queens. "Wagner was buried beside the graves of his father, United States Senator Robert F. Wagner, and mother, Margaret, and first wife, Susan Edwards Wagner, and not far from the grave of New York's Governor Al Smith."

The Robert F. Wagner Graduate School of Public Service at New York University is named in his honor, as is Robert F. Wagner Jr. Park in Battery Park City and the Robert F. Wagner Jr. Secondary School for Arts and Technology in Long Island City.

Wagner's papers, photographs, artifacts and other materials are housed at the New York City Municipal Archives and at La Guardia and Wagner Archives.

== See also ==
- List of mayors of New York City
- Timeline of New York City, 1950s–1960s
- J. Raymond Jones

New York State Assembly
Preceded by William Schwartz	New York State Assembly, New York County 16th District; 1938–1942	Succeeded by John P. Morrissey
Political offices
Preceded by Hugo Rogers	Borough President of Manhattan; 1950–1953	Succeeded by Hulan E. Jack
Preceded by Vincent R. Impellitteri	Mayor of New York City; 1954–1965	Succeeded by John V. Lindsay
Party political offices
Preceded by Herbert H. Lehman	Democratic Nominee for U.S. Senate from New York (Class 3); 1956	Succeeded by James B. Donovan
Diplomatic posts
Preceded by Frank E. McKinney	U.S. Ambassador to Spain; 1968–1969	Succeeded by Robert C. Hill
