= Robert F. Wagner Jr. (deputy mayor) =

American politician

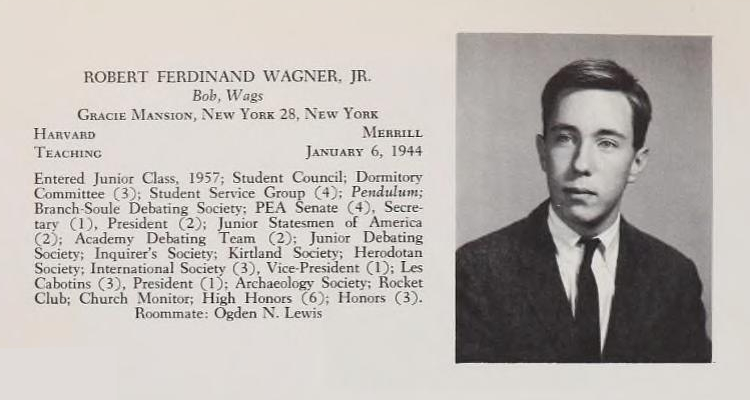
- Wagner in 1961

Deputy mayor of New York City
- In office 1979–1983
- Mayor: Ed Koch

Personal details
- Born: Robert Ferdinand Wagner III; January 6, 1944
- Died: November 15, 1993 (aged 49) San Antonio, Texas, U.S.
- Party: Democratic
- Parent: Robert F. Wagner Jr. (father)
- Relatives: Robert F. Wagner (grandfather)
- Education: Harvard University; University of Sussex; Princeton University (MPA)
- Occupation: Politician

Robert Ferdinand Wagner III (January 6, 1944 – November 15, 1993) was an American politician and public servant. He was a New York City civic leader who served as Deputy Mayor of the City of New York, and President of the New York City Board of Education. He is often confused with his father of the same name, Robert F. Wagner Jr., who served as Manhattan Borough President and Mayor of the City of New York during Robert III's youth. He was also the grandson of Senator Robert Ferdinand Wagner I. He changed his name to Robert F. Wagner Jr. after his father dropped the "Jr".

== Biography ==
Robert III was the son of Robert Ferdinand Wagner II and his first wife Susan. Robert III was nine years old when his father, the Manhattan Borough President, was elected to the first of three terms as Mayor of New York City. He was educated at the Buckley School in Manhattan, Phillips Exeter Academy, graduated from Harvard University in 1965, studied abroad at the University of Sussex, and then earned an MPA with a concentration in Urban Affairs from the Woodrow Wilson School at Princeton University.

== Public service ==
Wagner was an elected City Councilman-at-large in Manhattan. He lost the Democratic primary for Manhattan Borough President (his father's old job) to Andrew Stein in 1977, which seemingly ended the possibility of Wagner ascending to higher elected office. He served as Deputy Mayor for Policy, chairman of the City Planning Commission, president of the Health and Hospitals Commission, and president of the New York City Board of Education under New York City Mayor Ed Koch.

Wagner later served as a senior policy adviser to New York City mayors and New York governors for over twenty years. Primarily a Democrat, he supported Republican-Liberal Rudy Giuliani in his candidacy for mayor against David Dinkins. At the time of his death, Wagner was serving as senior policy adviser to mayor-elect Giuliani, who was expected to return Wagner to his post as a Deputy Mayor; was chairman of the civic group Citizens Union; was vice-president of the polling organization LH Research; and had expressed an interest in joining the administration of Bill Clinton in an urban policy capacity – his expertise.

== Death ==
On November 15, 1993, Wagner died in San Antonio, Texas, while researching a book he was writing on urban America. He had complained of flu-like symptoms to friends in the two days preceding his death, but had not sought medical treatment. He was survived by his younger brother Duncan. A memorial service was held for him at St. Patrick's Cathedral.
