= Marian Javits =

American arts patron

- Born: Marian Ann Borris; January 19, 1925; Detroit, Michigan, U.S.
- Died: February 28, 2017 (aged 92); New York City, U.S.
- Occupation: Arts patron
- Spouse: Jacob K. Javits (m. 1947; died 1986)
- Children: 3

Marian Ann Borris Javits, sometimes Marion (January 19, 1925 – February 28, 2017) was an American arts patron. She was married to the politician Jacob K. Javits from 1947 until his death in 1986.

== Early life ==
She was born Marian Ann Borris in Detroit, Michigan. She had dreams of becoming a Hollywood actress, but instead moved to New York to work as a researcher for the Republican Party.

== Career ==
Javits appeared in a few movies, including 1960's Who Was That Lady? starring Tony Curtis and Dean Martin.

Later she worked for a public relations firm, Ruder Finn which handled the account of the Iranian national airline during the reign of the last Shah to occupy the throne. This all transpired while her husband served on the United States Senate Committee on Foreign Relations and with the looming change of regime in Iran and his introduction of certain legislation it became the focus of some acrimony and controversy. Having registered as a foreign agent for the lobbying effort, amidst the publicity she resigned.

== Death ==
Javits was found unconscious in bed in her Manhattan apartment on February 28, 2017. She was declared dead at age 92.

== Personal life ==
In 1945 she began dating the politician Jacob K. Javits, who was 21 years older, and she became his second wife in 1947. They had three children together.

She had an affair with the talk show host Geraldo Rivera.
