= Donald Mahley =

American military officer and diplomat

- Born: July 16, 1942; Peru, Indiana
- Died: March 1, 2014 (aged 71); Vienna, Virginia
- Education: Purdue University, University of Pittsburgh

Donald Arthur Mahley (July 16, 1942 – March 1, 2014) was an American military officer and diplomat.

Born in Peru, Indiana, Mahley received his bachelor's degree from Purdue University and his master's degree from the University of Pittsburgh. He served in Vietnam, Turkey, and Belgium in the United States Army. He was deputy assistant secretary of state for arms control implementation and United States representative to the Organisation for the Prohibition of Chemical Weapons. He died in Vienna, Virginia of cancer.
