= 1974 United States Senate election in New York =

- November 5, 1974
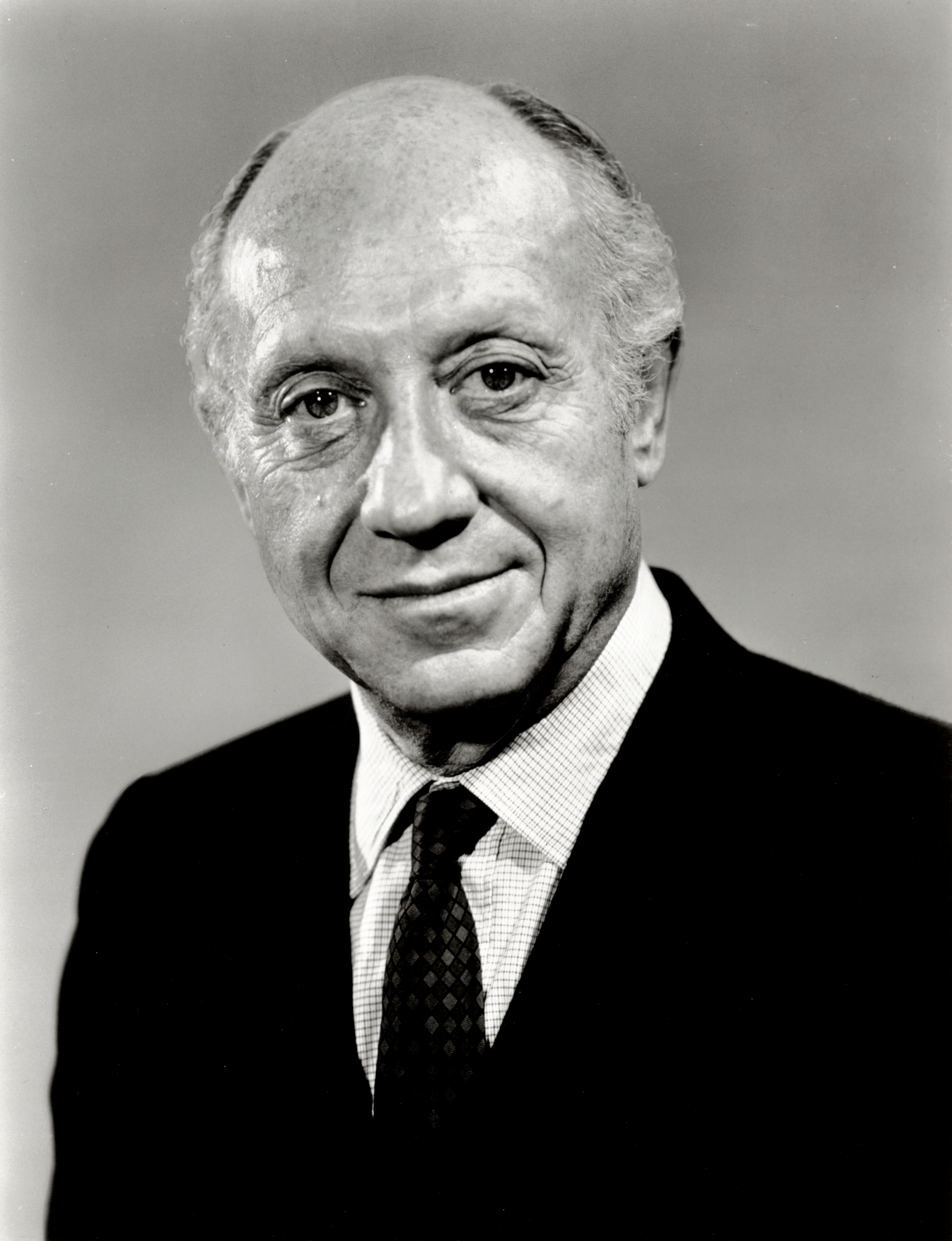

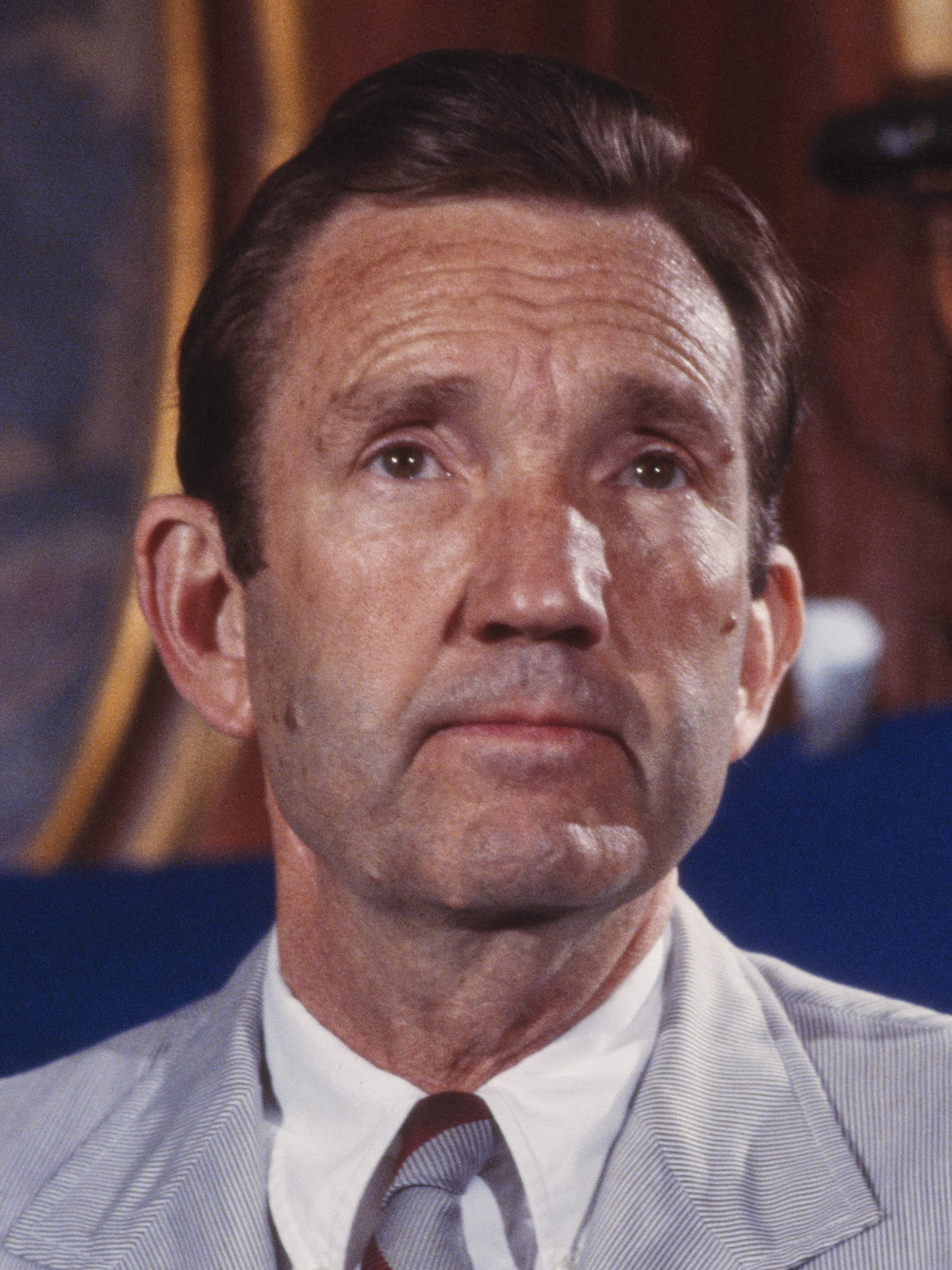

Nominee	Jacob Javits	Ramsey Clark	Barbara A. Keating
Party	Republican	Democratic	Conservative
Alliance	Liberal
Popular vote	2,340,188	1,973,781	822,584
Percentage	45.32%	38.23%	15.93%
- County results Javits: 30–40% 40–50% 50–60% Clark: 40–50% 50–60%
U.S. senator before election
Jacob Javits
Republican
Elected U.S. Senator
Jacob Javits
Republican

The 1974 United States Senate election in New York was held on November 5, 1974. Republican incumbent Jacob Javits was re-elected to a fourth term in office against Ramsey Clark and Barbara Keating.

== Democratic primary ==
=== Candidates ===
- Lee Alexander, mayor of Syracuse
- Ramsey Clark, former United States attorney general
- Abraham Hirschfeld, real estate developer

==== Withdrew ====
- Allard K. Lowenstein, former U.S. representative from Nassau County (withdrew after defeat at convention)

=== Convention results ===
Democratic Party Convention results
Party	Candidate	Votes	%
Democratic	Lee Alexander		58.70%
Democratic	Allard K. Lowenstein		39.90%
Democratic	Ramsey Clark		< 1.00%
Democratic	Abraham Hirschfeld		< 1.00%
Total votes			100.00%

=== Results ===
Primary results by county Clark: Clark 30–40%; Clark 40–50%; Clark 50–60%; Clark 60–70%; Alexander: Alexander 40–50%; Alexander 50–60%; Alexander 60–70%; Alexander 70–80%; Hirschfeld: Hirschfeld 30–40%

Democratic Party primary results
Party	Candidate	Votes	%
Democratic	Ramsey Clark	414,327	47.97%
Democratic	Lee Alexander	255,250	29.56%
Democratic	Abraham Hirschfeld	194,076	22.47%
Total votes		863,653	100.00%

== Conservative primary ==
=== Candidates ===
- Barbara A. Keating, Vietnam war widow

==== Withdrew ====
- Dennis Bonnette, Niagara University philosophy professor (following first convention ballot)
- Roy Cohn, attorney (withdrew June 28)

=== Convention results ===
The convention used a weighted voting system. Cohn was eligible to seek a primary, but opted not to.

Conservative Party Convention results
Party	Candidate	Votes	%
Conservative	Barbara A. Keating	22,723	61.81%
Conservative	Roy Cohn	14,041	38.19%
Total votes		36,764	100.00%

== General election ==
=== Candidates ===
- Elijah C. Boyd (American Labor)
- Ramsey Clark, former United States attorney general (Democratic)
- William F. Dowling (American)
- Mildred Edelman (Communist)
- Rebecca Finch (Socialist Workers)
- Jacob Javits, incumbent senator since 1957 (Republican and Liberal)
- Barbara Keating, Vietnam War widow (Conservative)
- Robert E. Massi (Socialist Labor)

=== Results ===
General election results
Party	Candidate	Votes	%	±%
Republican	Jacob K. Javits (incumbent)	2,098,529	40.64%	
Liberal	Jacob K. Javits (incumbent)	241,659	4.68%	
Total	Jacob K. Javits (incumbent)	2,340,188	45.32%	▼4.36
Democratic	Ramsey Clark	1,973,781	38.23%	▲5.55
Conservative	Barbara A. Keating	822,584	15.93%	▼1.38
Socialist Workers	Rebecca Finch	7,727	0.15%	▲0.07
American	William F. Dowling	7,459	0.14%	▲0.14
Socialist Labor	Robert E. Massi	4,037	0.08%	▼0.04
Communist	Mildred Edelman	3,876	0.08%	N/A
American Labor	Elijah C. Boyd	3,798	0.07%	▲0.07
Total votes		5,163,459	100.00%	
Republican hold		Swing		

== See also ==
- 1974 United States Senate elections
