= Herman Ferguson =

Herman Benjamin Ferguson (December 31, 1920 - September 25, 2014) was an African-American educator and Black nationalist activist.

Ferguson was born in Fayetteville, North Carolina. Both of his parents were teachers. He earned a bachelor's degree from Wilberforce University and a master's from New York University. Beginning in 1949 he worked as a teacher and school administrator in New York City and Cleveland, Ohio.

Ferguson was a founding member of Malcolm X's Organization of Afro-American Unity and witnessed his assassination in 1965. He became a leader in the Revolutionary Action Movement. In March 1968, he was named minister of education in the newly formed "provisional government" of the Republic of New Afrika. In June of that year, he was convicted of conspiring to kill Roy Wilkins and Whitney Young, leaders of the NAACP and the Urban League, mainly on the strength of an NYPD informant's testimony. Ferguson was convicted by an all-white jury. He jumped bail and fled to Guyana, where he lived for almost two decades, working for the Guyanese government. The US government didn't seek his extradition. In 1989 he returned to the US, seeking to clear his name. He served three years in prison. After his release he helped found the Jericho Movement, an organization advocating for the release of American political prisoners. Ferguson died in 2014.

== Books ==
- Ferguson, Iyaluua, and Ferguson, Herman Benjamin. An Unlikely Warrior: Herman Ferguson, the Evolution of a Black Nationalist Revolutionary. United States, Ferguson-Swan Publications, 2011.

== See also ==
- 1968 New York City teachers' strike
