= Electoral history of the Conservative Party of New York State =

This is a list detailing the electoral history of the Conservative Party in New York, sorted by year. The list currently consists of candidates who ran for partisan office, either those who ran on the Conservative Party label or were endorsed by the party. In the case of endorsements, the vote tallied is that which the candidate received under that label.

== Federal Elections ==
=== President of the United States ===
Year	Party designee for President & Vice President		Designees' Party	# Votes	% Votes	Place	Notes
1968	Richard Nixon	Spiro Agnew	Republican	Slate Not On Ballot			
1972	Richard Nixon	Spiro Agnew	Republican	368,136	5.14%	State Won; 3rd	
1976	Gerald Ford	Bob Dole	Republican	274,878	4.21%	3rd	
1980	Ronald Reagan	George H. W. Bush	Republican	256,131	4.13%	State Won; 4th	
1984	Ronald Reagan	George H. W. Bush	Republican	288,244	4.24%	State Won; 3rd	
1988	George H. W. Bush	Dan Quayle	Republican	243,457	3.75%	3rd	
1992	George H. W. Bush	Dan Quayle	Republican	177,000	2.56%	4th	
1996	Bob Dole	Jack Kemp	Republican	183,392	2.90%	4th	
2000	George W. Bush	Dick Cheney	Republican	144,797	2.12%	4th	
2004	George W. Bush	Dick Cheney	Republican	155,574	2.10%	3rd	
2008	John McCain	Sarah Palin	Republican	170,475	2.23%	3rd	
2012	Mitt Romney	Paul Ryan	Republican	262,304	3.71%	3rd	
2016	Donald Trump	Mike Pence	Republican	292,392	3.81%	3rd	
2020	Donald Trump	Mike Pence	Republican	295,657	3.44%	4th	
2024	Donald Trump	JD Vance	Republican	321,733	3.89%	3rd	

=== U.S. Senate Class I Seat ===
County Results of the 1970 Senatorial Election. Buckley won the election, carrying thirty-eight counties. The difference between James Buckley and his closest opponent, Democratic Congressman Richard Ottinger, was about 117,000 votes.

Year	Party designee	Designee Party	# Votes	% Votes	Place	Notes
1964	Henry Paolucci	Conservative	212,216	2.97%	4th	
1970	James L. Buckley	Conservative	2,176,640	37.05%	Elected; 1st	
1976	James L. Buckley	Republican	311,494	4.93%	3rd	
1982	Florence Sullivan	Republican	175,650	3.54%	3rd	
1988	Robert R. McMillan	Republican	189,226	3.13%	3rd	
1994	Bernadette Castro	Republican	276,548	5.77%	3rd	
2000	Rick Lazio	Republican	191,141	2.82%	3rd	
2006	John Spencer	Republican	179,287	3.99%	3rd	
2010 (SE)	Joseph J. DioGuardi	Republican	244,320	5.42%	3rd	
2012	Wendy E. Long	Republican	241,074	3.61%	4th	
2018	Chele Chiavacci Farley	Republican	246,171	4.07%	3rd	
2024	Mike Sapraicone	Republican	329,070	4.12%	4th	

=== U.S. Senate Class III Seat ===
The Conservative's candidate win in the 1970 United States Senate election in New York was the breakthrough race for the party.

Year	Party designee	Designee Party	# Votes	% Votes	Place	Notes
1962	Kieran O'Doherty	Conservative	116,151	2.04%	4th	
1968	James L. Buckley	Conservative	1,139,402	17.31%	3rd	
1974	Barbara A. Keating	Conservative	822,584	15.93%	3rd	
1980	Al D'Amato	Republican	275,100	4.57%	Elected; 4th	
1986	Al D'Amato	Republican	212,101	5.07%	Re-elected; 3rd	
1992	Al D'Amato	Republican	289,258	4.48%	Re-elected; 3rd	
1998	Al D'Amato	Republican	274,220	5.87%	3rd	
2004	Marilyn O'Grady	Conservative	220,960	3.30%	3rd	
2010	Jay Townsend	Republican	240,800	5.24%	3rd	
2016	Wendy Long	Republican	267,622	3.62%	3rd	
2022	Joe Pinion	Republican	296,652	5.07%	4th	

=== U.S. House of Representatives ===
1964

District	Party designee	Designee Party	# Votes	% Votes	Place	Notes
1	No Candidate Nominated					
2	No Candidate Nominated					
3	No Candidate Nominated					
4	No Candidate Nominated					
5	No Candidate Nominated					
6	No Candidate Nominated					
7	Erling Asheim	Conservative	3,240	1.87%	4th	
8	Charles P. Hosteck	Conservative	5,071	2.56%	4th	
9	No Candidate Nominated					
10	No Candidate Nominated					
11	No Candidate Nominated					
12	No Candidate Nominated					
13	No Candidate Nominated					
14	No Candidate Nominated					
15	Luigi R. Marano	Republican	3,937	3.17%	3rd	
16	David D. Smith	Republican	6,929	4.76%	3rd	
17	Kieran O'Doherty	Conservative	9,491	5.00%	3rd	
18	George S. Schuyler	Conservative	637	0.57%	4th	
19	Suzanne La Follette	Conservative	1,363	1.11%	4th	
20	John Comninel	Conservative	2,944	1.96%	4th	
21	Thomes E. Rockwell	Conservative	1,716	1.57%	4th	
22	Joseph F. Joyce	Conservative	696	0.81%	4th	
23	William J. Lee, Jr.	Conservative	2,461	1.62%	4th	
24	No Candidate Nominated					
25	No Candidate Nominated					
26	Robert F. Mitchell, Jr.	Conservative	5,339	2.87%	4th	
27	No Candidate Nominated					
28	J. Ernest Wharton	Republican	2,035	1.13%	3rd	
29	John D. Meader	Republican	1,325	0.58%	4th	
30	No Candidate Nominated					
31	Robert C. McEwen	Republican	1,371	1.01%	4th	
32	No Candidate Nominated					
33	No Candidate Nominated					
34	R. Walter Riehlman	Republican	2,641	1.41%	4th	
35	Robert M. Quigley	Republican	1,028	0.59%	4th	
36	No Candidate Nominated					
37	No Candidate Nominated					
38	No Candidate Nominated					
39	No Candidate Nominated					
40	No Candidate Nominated					
41	No Candidate Nominated					
42	No Candidate Nominated					
43	No Candidate Nominated					

== State Elections ==
=== Governor ===
County Results of the 1990 Gubernatorial Election. London carried five counties, and nearly pushed Rinfret, the Republican nominee, into third place. The difference between the two was just over 38,000 votes.

Year	Party designee	Designee Party	# Votes	% Votes	Place	Notes
1962	David H. Jaquith	Conservative	141,877	2.44	3rd of 5	
1966	Paul Adams	Conservative	510,023	8.46	3rd of 6	
1970	Paul Adams	Conservative	422,514	7.03	3rd of 6	
1974	Malcolm Wilson	Republican	269,080	5.09	3rd of 9	
1978	Perry Duryea	Republican	242,972	5.10	3rd of 9	
1982	Lewis Lehrman	Republican	230,153	4.38	3rd of 9	
1986	Andrew P. O'Rourke	Republican	152,306	3.55	3rd of 6	
1990	Herbert London	Conservative	827,614	20.40	3rd of 7	
1994	George Pataki	Republican	328,605	6.31	3rd of 9	
1998	George Pataki	Republican	348,727	7.36	4th of 12	
2002	George Pataki	Republican	176,848	3.86	4th of 10	
2006	John Faso	Republican	168,654	3.80	4th of 9	
2010	Carl Paladino	Republican	232,215	4.99	3rd of 11	
2014	Rob Astorino	Republican	250,634	6.57	3rd of 10	
2018	Marc Molinaro	Republican	253,624	4.16	3rd of 10	
2022	Lee Zeldin	Republican	313,187	5.31	3rd of 4	

=== Attorney General ===
Year	Party designee	Designee Party	# Votes	% Votes	Place	Notes
1962	Frederick S. Dennin	Conservative	99,464	1.76	4th of 5	
1966	Mason L. Hampton	Conservative	322,693	5.65	3rd of 5	
1970	Leo Kesselring	Conservative	409,169	7.41	3rd of 5	
1974	Edward F. Campbell	Conservative	232,631	4.58	4th of 8	
1978	Michael Roth	Republican	259,199	5.93	3rd of 7	
1982	Frances A. Sclafani	Republican	178,477	3.76	3rd of 6	
1986	Peter T. King	Republican	139,964	3.58	3rd of 6	
1990	Bernard C. Smith	Republican	284,244	7.42	3rd of 8	
1994	Dennis Vacco	Republican	305,961	6.57	3rd of 8	
1998	Dennis Vacco	Republican	302,223	6.99	3rd of 8	
2002	Dora Irizarry	Republican	124,657	3.02	4th of 8	
2006	Jeanine Pirro	Republican	168,051	3.91	3rd of 8	
2010	Daniel M. Donovan, Jr.	Republican	281,585	6.34	3rd of 7	
2014	John P. Cahill	Republican	239,266	6.60	3rd of 7	
2018	Keith Wofford	Republican	257,090	4.29	3rd of 8	
2022	Michael Henry	Republican	313,728	5.41	3rd of 4	

=== Comptroller ===
Year	Party designee	Designee Party	# Votes	% Votes	Place	Notes
1962	Thomas D. Cole	Conservative	99,971	1.77	4th of 6	
1966	Benjamin R. Crosby	Conservative	331,467	5.80	3rd of 6	
1970	Anthony R. Spinelli	Conservative	436,584	7.94	3rd of 6	
1974	Bradley J. Hurd	Conservative	244,701	5.02	3rd of 8	
1978	Edward Regan	Republican	284,707	6.35	3rd of 7	
1982	Edward Regan	Republican	262,716	5.54	3rd of 6	
1986	Edward Regan	Republican	222,803	5.60	3rd of 6	
1990	Edward Regan	Republican	391,743	10.16	3rd of 8	
1994	Herbert London	Republican	282,922	6.09	3rd of 8	
1998	Bruce A. Blakeman	Republican	219,548	4.97	3rd of 8	
2002	John Faso	Republican	152,763	3.67	4th of 9	
2006	Christopher Callaghan	Republican	206,427	4.99	3rd of 8	
2010	Harry Wilson	Republican	243,419	5.44	3rd of 7	
2014	Bob Antonacci	Republican	246,627	6.28	3rd of 7	
2018	Jonathan Trichter	Republican	231,380	3.84	3rd of 9	
2022	Paul Rodriguez	Republican	292,337	5.07	4th of 4	

=== State Assembly ===
Year	# Votes	% Votes	# Seats	% Seats	Place	Notes
1962			0	0		
1966			0	0		
1968			2	1.33		
1970			2	1.33		
1972			1	0.67		
1974			1	0.67		
1976			0	0		
1978			0	0		
1980			0	0		
1982			0	0		
1984			0	0		
1986			0	0		
1988			0	0		
1990			0	0		
1992			0	0		
1994			0	0		
1996			0	0		
1998			0	0		
2000			0	0		
2002			0	0		
2004			0	0		
2006			0	0		
2008			0	0		
2010			0	0		
2012			0	0		

== Local Elections ==
=== Mayor of Buffalo ===
Year	Party designee	Designee Party	# Votes	% Votes	Place	Notes
1965	Bernard Kurtz	Conservative	974	0.56	3rd of 3	
1969	Alfreda Slominski	Republican	7,430	4.57	3rd of 5	
1973	John A. Westra	Conservative	2,640	2.48	3rd of 5	
1977	James D. Griffin	Conservative	57,642	41.97	1st of 5	
1981	James D. Griffin	Democratic	2,584	3.22	4th of 5	
1985	James D. Griffin	Republican	10,032	7.65	3rd of 6	
1989	James D. Griffin	Democratic				
1993	Eugene M. Fahey	Conservative	7,566	14.29	3rd of 3	
1997	Sharon Caetano	Conservative	1,258	1.76	5th of 5	
2001	Anthony Masiello	Democratic	1,099	2.88	4th of 4	
2005	Kevin J. Helfer	Republican	2,173	2.97	5th of 5	
2009	Byron Brown	Democratic	643	3.59	4th of 4	
2013	Byron Brown	Democratic	665	1.80	5th of 6	
2017	Anita L. Howard	Conservative	1,357	3.09	2nd of 7	

=== Mayor of New York City ===
Year	Party designee	Designee Party	# Votes	% Votes	Place	Notes
1965	William F. Buckley	Conservative	341,226	13.36	3rd of 8	
1969	John Marchi	Republican	212,905	8.91	4th of 7	
1973	Mario Biaggi	Conservative	178,967	10.49	4th of 7	
1977	Barry Farber	Conservative	57,437	4.00	4th of 10	
1981	John A. Esposito	Conservative	60,100	4.92	4th of 8	
1985	Diane McGrath	Republican	22,160	1.99	4th of 8	
1989	Ronald Lauder	Conservative	9,271	0.51	4th of 9	
1993	George J. Marlin	Conservative	9,433	0.52	4th of 9	
1997	Didn't Endorse					
2001	Terrence Gray	Conservative	3,577	0.24	8th of 12	
2005	Tom Ognibene	Conservative	14,630	1.13	6th of 10	
2009	Stephen A. Christopher	Conservative	18,015	1.56	5th of 10	
2013	Joseph J. Lhota	Republican	24,888	2.29	4th of 20	
2017	Nicole Malliotakis	Republican	37,197	3.25	4th of 10	
2021	Bill Pepitone	Conservative	12,575	1.12	4th of 10	
