= History of the Conservative Party of New York State =

Conservative Party of New York State chronic

The Conservative Party of New York State originated in 1962 when a group of conservatives founded the party to oppose the perceived liberalism of the New York State Republican Party using New York fusion voting law to endorse and support more right-leaning candidates.

== 1960s ==
=== Origins ===
The Conservative Party of New York State was founded in 1962 by a group including J. Daniel Mahoney, Kieran O'Doherty, Charles E. Rice, Raymond R. Walker and Charles Edison. These conservatives created the party to oppose the perceived liberalism of the New York State Republican Party using New York fusion voting law to endorse and support more right-leaning candidates. In fusion voting, an electoral candidate can appear on multiple party lines in the same election. The CPNYS sought to oppose the Liberal Party of New York, which also used fusion voting to support favorable candidates. According to The New York Times, the party's support "came mainly from those who would later be called Reagan Democrats—working-class, urban and suburban, often Catholic."

=== State and local elections ===
Prominent conservative author and commentator William F. Buckley Jr. ran for Mayor of New York City on the Conservative Party line in 1965, winning 13.4% of the vote. An op-ed in The New York Times described the Buckley campaign as "a watershed campaign for the Conservatives, who gained heavy publicity and proved their strength in the overwhelmingly Democratic city."

In 1966, Conservative candidate Paul L. Adams obtained more than half a million votes in his race for Governor of New York, winning Row C for the Party.

== 1970s ==
=== Federal elections ===
In 1970, James Buckley, the brother of William F. Buckley Jr., ran for U.S. Senate as the candidate of the Conservative Party. Running only on the Conservative Party line and the Independent Alliance Party line, Buckley defeated Democratic Congressman Richard Ottinger and unelected incumbent Republican U.S. Senator Charles Goodell, receiving 39% of the vote. Buckley served one term in the Senate. According to the New York Post, "Buckley's victory cemented, for a time, an electoral coalition of urban, ethnic Democrats with rural and suburban Republicans—all disgusted with excessive taxation, runaway government spending and the decline of traditional values." In 1976, Buckley ran for reelection to the U.S. Senate as the candidate of the Republican and Conservative parties, losing to Democrat Daniel Patrick Moynihan.

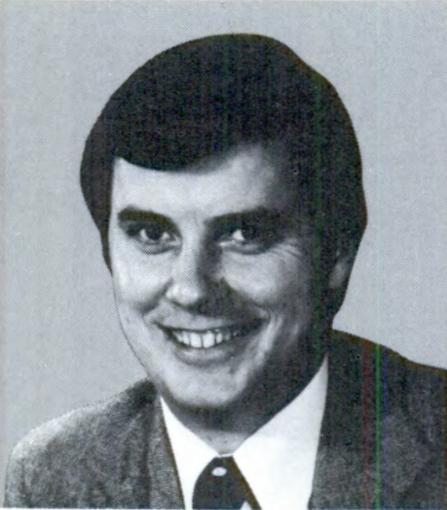
William Carney represented New York's 1st congressional district as a member of the Conservative Party from 1979 to 1985.

In 1978, registered Conservative William Carney, a member of the Suffolk County legislature, was elected to the United States House of Representatives in New York's 1st congressional district, a long-time Democratic stronghold on Long Island, after winning the Republican primary and running on both party lines. He eventually served four terms before retiring.

== 1980s ==
=== State and local elections ===
In the 1982 gubernatorial election, the party nominated Republican Lewis Lehrman, who was narrowly defeated by Democrat Mario Cuomo. In the 1986 gubernatorial election, the party nominated Republican Andrew P. O'Rourke, who was defeated by Cuomo in a landslide.

=== Federal elections ===
In 1980, the Conservative Party endorsed Al D'Amato in a U.S. Senate race in which he successfully challenged incumbent Sen. Jacob Javits in a Republican primary. D'Amato then narrowly prevailed in the general election over Democrat Elizabeth Holtzman; the 275,100 votes D'Amato received on the Conservative line exceeded his slim margin of victory.

== 1990s ==
=== State and local elections ===
The CPNYS refused to endorse some GOP candidates in the 1990s and early 2000s, but endorsed others.

Herbert London was the Conservative Party's nominee for Governor of New York in 1990; that year, the party broke from the Republican Party, declining to cross-endorse Republican nominee Pierre Rinfret. Conservatives leaders cited Rinfret's support for abortion, his perceived lack of seriousness about his candidacy, and his potential difficulties in attacking incumbent Democratic Governor Mario Cuomo on fiscal policies as reasons for their decision to support London instead. London ran a strong campaign statewide and finished one percentage point behind Rinfret, while Democratic Governor Mario Cuomo easily won re-election.

The party declined to endorse Republican Rudy Giuliani for Mayor of New York City in his successful 1993 and 1997 campaigns. In each of those elections, Giuliani accepted the endorsement of the Liberal Party. The Conservative Party endorsed George Marlin for Mayor in 1993 and left its line blank in the 1997 New York City mayoral race.

The party endorsed Republican George Pataki in his successful 1994 campaign to unseat incumbent Democratic Gov. Mario Cuomo. In that race, Pataki "drew more than 300,000 votes on the Conservative line, double his slender winning margin over Mr. Cuomo."

== 2000s ==
=== State and local elections ===
The party ran its own candidates for Mayor of New York City in the 2001, 2005, and 2009, declining to support successful Republican candidate Michael Bloomberg.

John Spencer, a former mayor of Yonkers, New York, was nominated for U.S. Senate by the Republican and Conservative Parties in the 2006 Senate election against Hillary Clinton. Spencer was defeated by Clinton.

In the 2006 race for governor, Conservative Party Chairman Michael Long endorsed John Faso, the former Assembly Minority Leader and Republican State Comptroller nominee in 2002. Faso won the nomination at the Republican convention, defeating former Massachusetts Gov. Bill Weld, 61–39%. Following the convention, Weld withdrew from the race as senior party officials (including state Republican chairman Stephen Minarik, who endorsed Weld) urged party unity. In the general election, Faso was the nominee of both the Republican and Conservative parties, but was defeated by Eliot Spitzer.

=== Federal elections ===
The Conservative Party nominated Republican candidates John McCain and Sarah Palin for president and vice president in the 2008 election, which was won by Democrat Barack Obama and Joe Biden.

2009 special election results, New York's 23rd congressional district

In the 2009 NY-23 special election, the CPNYS endorsed Doug Hoffman over moderate Republican Dede Scozzafava, who CPNYS chair Long called a "nice lady who is too liberal." After Scozzafava suspended her campaign, prominent Republicans endorsed Hoffman. Scozzafava remained on the ballot. Democrat Bill Owens won 48.3%, Hoffman won 46.0%, and Scozzafava won 5.7%. The election received significant national attention, and was described as "a referendum on President Barack Obama" and "a fight over the identity of the Republican Party." According to one commentator, "tea party conservatives see the GOP loss as a victory for conservativism over mere political party loyalty. They're describing the defeat as a warning shot fired in defense of principle." In addition, elected officials and observers opined that the congressional race affected the New York State Senate's December 2, 2009 vote against same-sex marriage legislation.

== 2010s ==
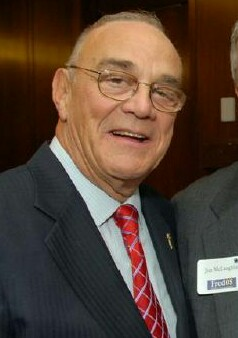
Michael Long served as the chairman of the party for over 30 years, from 1988 to 2019.

As of 2018, the Party holds "Row C" on New York ballots—the third-place ballot position, directly below the Democratic and Republican parties—because it received the third-highest number of votes of any political party in the 2010, 2014, and 2018 gubernatorial elections.

Long announced his retirement from the chairmanship of the Conservative Party on January 28, 2019 after having served in that role for 30 years. In February 2019, he was elected Chairman Emeritus of the Party. On February 23, 2019, the Party named Gerard Kassar of Brooklyn as its new chairman.

=== Same-sex marriage ===
Prior to the passage of same-sex marriage legislation in 2011, Long stated that the party would not endorse any candidate who supported same-sex marriage. Four Republican state senators—Sens. James Alesi, Mark Grisanti, Roy McDonald, and Stephen Saland—voted in favor of same-sex marriage. Alesi did not seek re-election in 2012, while Grisanti, McDonald, and Saland faced challengers in 2012 who received the Conservative Party's endorsement. Grisanti was re-elected to the State Senate, while McDonald was defeated in a Republican primary and Saland was defeated in a general election in which a Conservative Party-endorsed challenger acted as a spoiler.

=== State and local elections ===
In the 2010 gubernatorial election, CPNYS chairman Long supported Rick Lazio, while several county chairmen supported CPNYS vice chairman Ralph Lorigo. Lazio defeated Lorigo in the CPNYS primary election 60.2%–39.8%, but was defeated by Carl Paladino in the Republican primary. Lazio dropped out of the race on September 27, allowing a CPNYS vacancy committee to select his replacement. Long endorsed Paladino, the vacancy committee followed suit, and the CPNYS endorsed Paladino. Paladino lost the general election, but drew 232,264 votes on the Conservative Party line, which allowed the party to overtake the Independence Party of New York and retake Row C (the third place ballot position in New York elections) for the first time since the 1998 elections.

State Senator Mark Grisanti, the last remaining Republican state senator to have voted for the Marriage Equality Act, was again denied Conservative Party endorsement in 2014; the party instead endorsed dummy candidate Timothy Gallagher in State Senate District 60. Grisanti lost the Republican primary, but remained in the general election on the Independence line. In the general election, Gallagher—despite not campaigning at all—won 8 percent of the vote; the vote split between Gallagher, Grisanti, and Republican candidate Kevin Stocker allowed Democrat Marc Panepinto to win the election with only 34 percent of the vote.

The Party endorsed Rob Astorino very early in the 2014 gubernatorial election process.

In the 2014 election for New York State Comptroller, the party threatened to nominate its own candidate if the Republicans could not find a candidate from their party to run on the line; the GOP eventually nominated Onondaga County Comptroller Rob Antonacci.

On April 13, 2018, the Conservative Party executive committee selected Marcus Molinaro as its candidate in the 2018 gubernatorial election in what Long termed a "not very easy" decision; the party chose Molinaro over Deputy State Senate Majority Leader John A. DeFrancisco and openly refused to consider Erie County Executive Joel Giambra.

=== Federal elections ===
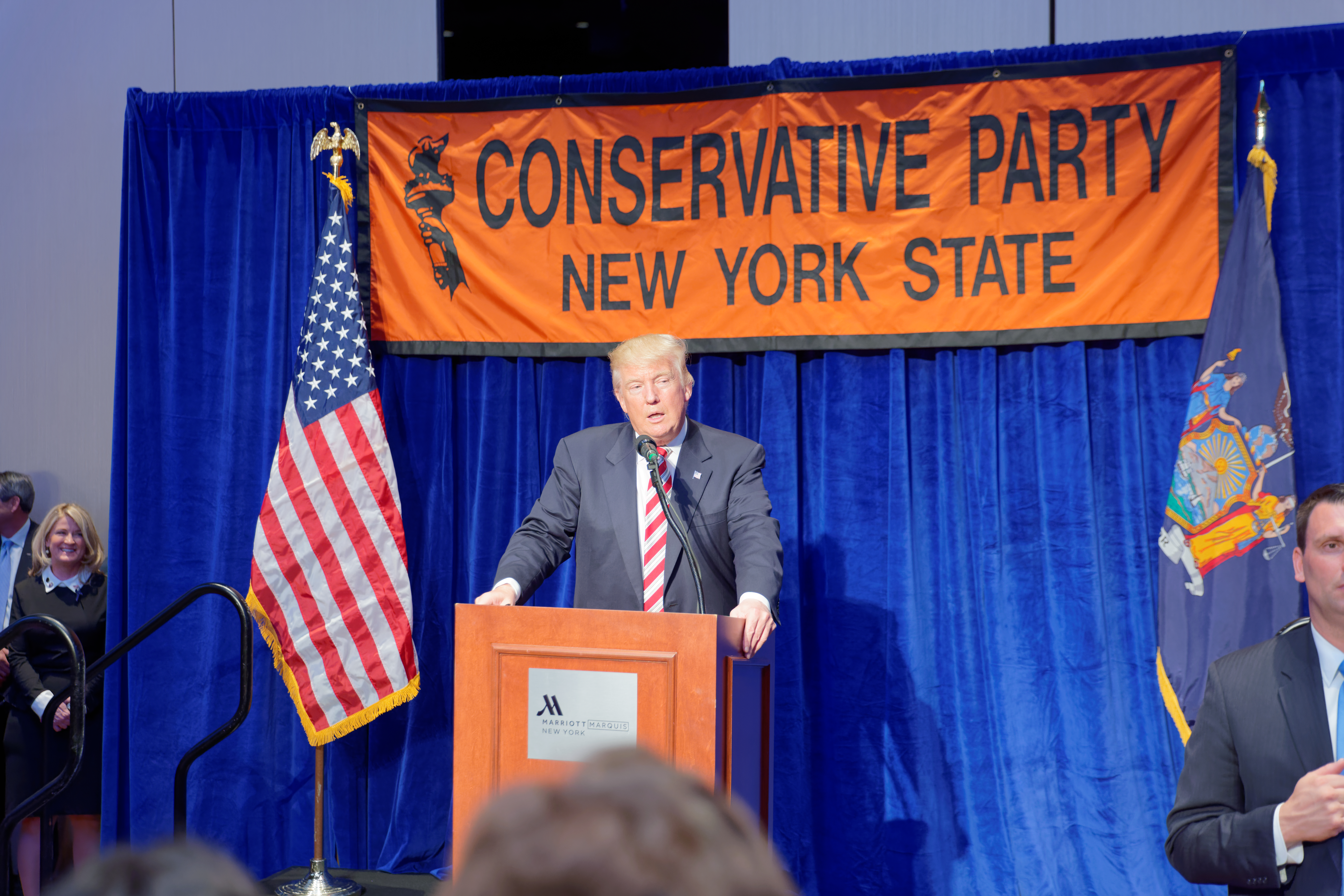
Then Presidential Candidate Donald Trump accepting the Conservative nomination at the New York Marriott Marquis on September 7, 2016

In 2016, the Conservative Party nominated eventual winner Donald Trump for President of the United States under a New York election law that allows multiple parties to nominate the same ticket.

=== Alleged party raiding ===
The Conservative Party of Cattaraugus County is alleged to have been the target of a hostile takeover by members of the Republican Party, after 37 former Republicans abruptly changed party registration in October 2017. County party chairman Leonard Ciros alleged that the Republican Party violated state party loyalty laws and the federal Racketeer Influenced and Corrupt Organizations Act.

== 2020s ==
=== State and local elections ===
During the 2022 New York gubernatorial election the party endorsed Republican Lee Zeldin who had the best showing as a Republican for governor since 1970 earning 2,762,581 votes and losing to incumbent Kathy Hochul by just 6.39% of the vote.

The party ran its own candidates for Mayor of New York City in 2021 and 2025. In 2024, Gonzalo Duran, Vice Chairman of the Bronx Conservative Party, petitioned for the mayoral candidacy but was not selected. He subsequently pivoted to run for Public Advocate of New York City, becoming the first Conservative candidate in over three election cycles to receive a cross-party endorsement in a citywide race.

In 2021, the Conservative Party successfully teamed up with the Republican Party to defeat three ballot initiatives proposed by Democrats.

=== Federal elections ===
In 2020, the Conservative Party nominated incumbent Republican President Donald Trump for re-election to the presidency. Trump was defeated by Democrat Joe Biden. In 2021, the Conservative Party successfully teamed up with the Republican Party to raise opposition among the state's voters and defeat three ballot initiatives proposed by Democrats.

On August 17, 2024, the Conservative Party nominated Trump for President of the United States during the 2024 presidential election.

== Chairs ==
Chairs of the Conservative Party
Chair	Tenure	Residence
Kieran O'Doherty	February–July 1962	Manhattan
J. Daniel Mahoney	July 1962 – April 1986	Manhattan
Serphin R. Maltese	April 1986 – December 1988	Queens
Michael R. Long	December 1988 – January 2019	Brooklyn
Gerard Kassar	February 2019 – present	Brooklyn
