= 1992 United States Senate election in New York =

- November 3, 1992
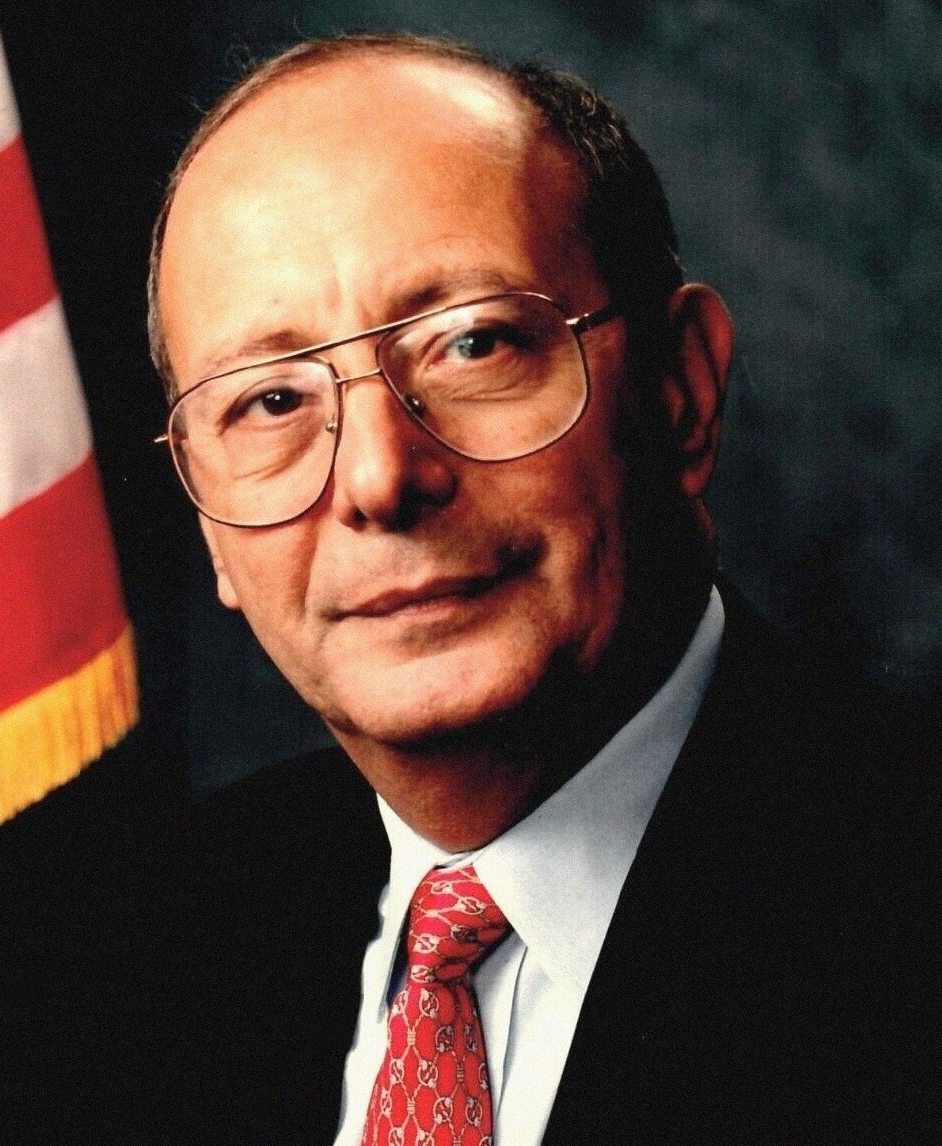

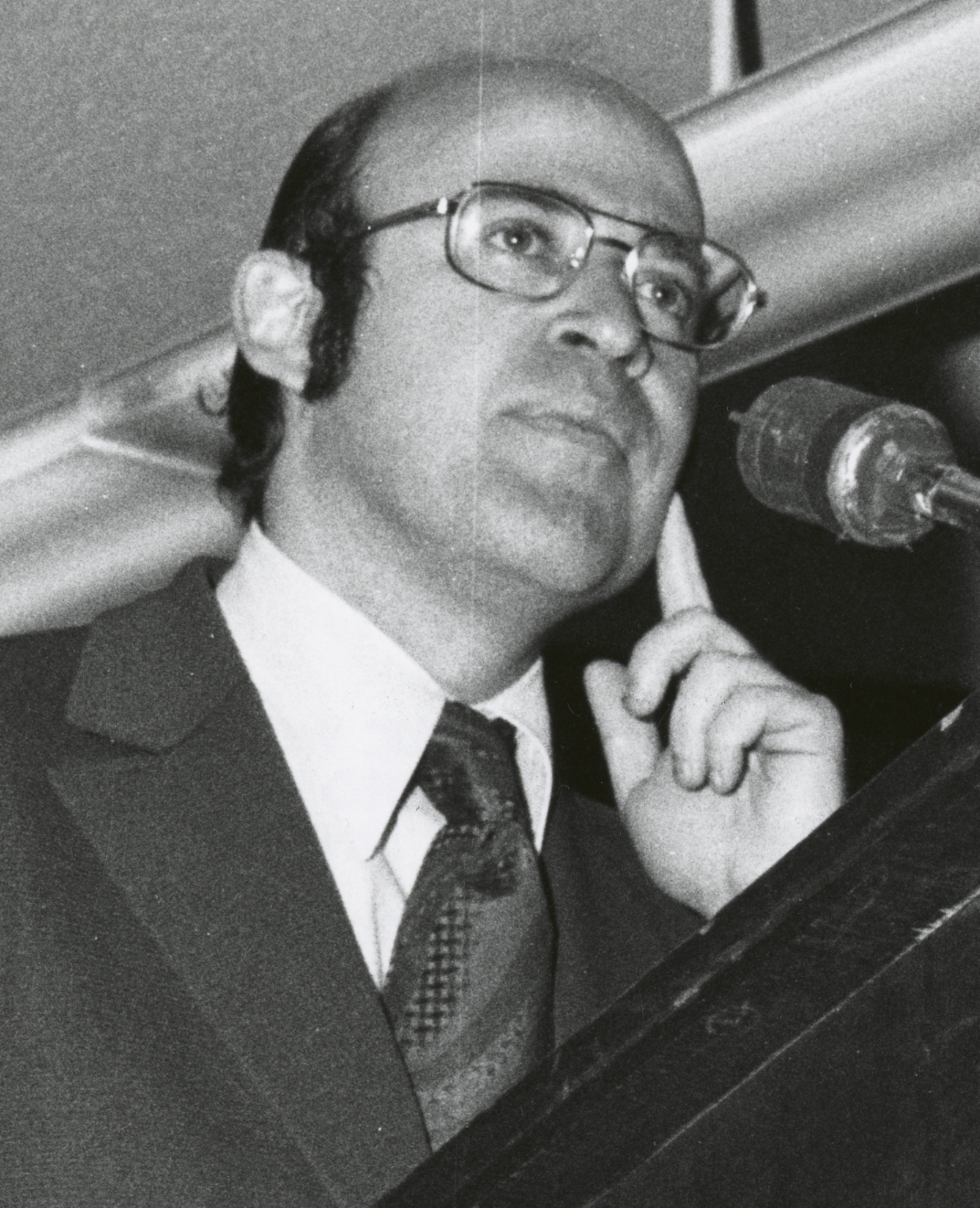
Nominee	Al D'Amato	Robert Abrams
Party	Republican	Democratic
Alliance	Parties: Conservative; Right to Life	Liberal
Popular vote	3,166,994	3,086,200
Percentage	49.03%	47.78%
- County results D'Amato: 40–50% 50–60% 60–70% Abrams: 40–50% 50–60% 60–70% 70–80%
U.S. senator before election
Al D'Amato
Republican
Elected U.S. Senator
Al D'Amato
Republican

The 1992 United States Senate election in New York took place on November 3, 1992, alongside other elections to the United States Senate in other states, as well as elections to the United States House of Representatives and various state and local elections. Incumbent Senator Al D'Amato narrowly won re-election to a third term. As of 2026, this is the last time Republicans won a U.S. Senate election in New York, and the last time that the winning presidential and U.S. Senate candidates in New York were of different political parties.

== Republican primary ==
=== Candidates ===
==== Declared ====
- Al D'Amato, incumbent Senator

==== Withdrew ====
- Laurance Rockefeller Jr., environmental attorney and nephew of former New York Governor and Vice President Nelson Rockefeller (failed to submit signatures)

=== Results ===
Senator D'Amato was unopposed for re-nomination.

== Democratic primary ==
=== Candidates ===
==== Declared ====
- Robert Abrams, New York Attorney General
- Geraldine Ferraro, former U.S. Representative, and Democratic nominee for vice president in 1984
- Elizabeth Holtzman, New York City Comptroller, and nominee for the U.S. Senate in 1980
- Al Sharpton, Baptist minister and civil rights activist

==== Withdrew ====
- Robert Mrazek, U.S. Representative from Suffolk County

==== Declined ====
- Mark Green, New York City Commissioner of Consumer Affairs; Democratic nominee for Senate in 1986

=== Campaign ===
The Democratic primary campaign featured State Attorney General Robert Abrams, former U.S. Congresswoman and 1984 vice presidential candidate Geraldine Ferraro, Reverend Al Sharpton, and New York City Comptroller and former Congresswoman Elizabeth Holtzman. Congressman Robert J. Mrazek was also an early candidate, but withdrew from the race after being named in the House banking scandal. Abrams was considered the initial front-runner.

Ferraro emphasized her career as a teacher, prosecutor, congresswoman, and mother, and positioned herself as being tough on crime. She soon took the lead in the polls, additionally capitalizing on her name recognition from 1984. However, she drew attacks from the media and her opponents over her husband John Zaccaro's finances and business relationships. Initially, Ferraro used the attacks in an attempt to galvanize the feminist vote, but her lead began to dwindle under the criticism, and she released additional tax returns in an attempt to defray the attacks. Holtzman ran a negative ad accusing Ferraro and Zaccaro of taking more than $300,000 in rent in the 1980s from a pornographer with purported ties to organized crime.

=== Results ===
Primary results by county. Map legend: Abrams—40–50%; Abrams—30–40%; Ferraro—30–40%; Ferraro—40–50%; Ferraro—50–60%; Ferraro—60–70%; Ferraro—70–80%

In the primary, Abrams won by less than one percentage point, winning 37 percent of the vote to Ferraro's 36 percent. Ferraro did not concede the election for two weeks.

Democratic primary results
Party	Candidate	Votes	%
Democratic	Robert Abrams	426,904	37.02%
Democratic	Geraldine Ferraro	415,650	36.04%
Democratic	Al Sharpton	166,665	14.45%
Democratic	Elizabeth Holtzman	144,026	12.49%
Total votes		1,153,245	100.00%

== General election ==
=== Campaign ===
After Abrams emerged as the nominee, the Democrats remained divided. In particular, Abrams spent much of the remainder of the campaign trying to get Ferraro's endorsement. Ferraro, enraged and bitter after the nature of the primary, ignored Abrams, and accepted Bill Clinton's request to campaign for his presidential bid instead. She was eventually persuaded by state party leaders into giving an unenthusiastic endorsement, with just three days to go before the general election, in exchange for an apology by Abrams for the tone of the primary.

Abrams was also accused of engaging in ethnically charged attacks against the Italian ancestry of both Ferraro and D'Amato. Ahead of the primary, Ferraro sought to defend herself against accusations that she received financial support from organized crime in her 1978 congressional campaign, claiming that, "If I were not Italian American, this whole thing would never have been brought up." In October, Abrams was again accused of anti-Italian political attacks, after calling D'Amato a "fascist" at a campaign event and alleging that he had engaged in the "big lie techniques" of Nazi propaganda officers. At a Columbus Day parade the following day, D'Amato accused Abrams of engaging in ethnic insults on his Italian ancestry, and in a subsequent campaign ad featured images of Italian fascist leader Benito Mussolini to depict the word "fascist" as an anti-Italian slur. Abrams narrowly lost the general election, partially as a result of these controversies.

=== Polling ===
Poll source	Date(s) administered	Sample size	Margin of error	Alfonse D'Amato (R)	Robert Abrams (D)	Other/Neither	Undecided
Buffalo News/Political-Media Research Inc.	October 30, 1992	833	± 3.5%	42%	44%	-	14%

=== Results ===
1992 U.S. Senate election in New York
Party	Candidate	Votes	%	±%
Republican	Al D'Amato (incumbent)	2,652,822	41.07%	−4.19%
Conservative	Al D'Amato (incumbent)	289,258	4.48%	−0.25%
Right to Life	Al D'Amato (incumbent)	224,914	3.48%	+0.46%
Total	Al D'Amato (incumbent)	3,166,994	49.03%	-4.00%
Democratic	Robert Abrams	2,943,001	45.57%	+7.15%
Liberal	Robert Abrams	143,199	2.22%	+0.88%
Total	Robert Abrams	3,086,200	47.78%	
Libertarian	Norma Segal	108,530	1.68%	
New Alliance	Mohammad T. Mehdi	56,631	0.88%	+0.64%
Natural Law	Stanley Nelson	23,747	0.37%	
Socialist Workers	Eddie Warren	16,724	0.26%	0.10%
Republican hold		Swing		

== See also ==
- 1992 United States Senate elections
