= Conservative Party of New York State =

American political party

- Chairperson: Gerard Kassar
- Founded: 1962; 64 years ago
- Split from: Republican Party of New York State
- Headquarters: Brooklyn, New York, U.S.
- Registered voters (February 20, 2026): 169,313
- Ideology: Conservatism (US)
- Political position: Right-wing
- Colors: Orange; Navy blue

Website
- www.cpnys.org

The Conservative Party of New York State (CPNYS) is a conservative minor political party in the United States. CPNYS supports cultural conservatism and right-libertarianism, in typical American conservative fusionism.

CPNYS was organized in 1962 amid conservative dissatisfaction with the Republican Party of New York State, perceived as too liberal. Running only on the Conservative Party line, James L. Buckley won election to the U.S. Senate in 1970 and served for one term. Since the 1970s, CPNYS has used two strategies to shift the Republican Party toward conservatism: First, CPNYS usually pursues electoral fusion, in which both the Conservative and Republican parties cross-endorse the same conservative candidate. Second, CPNYS sometimes runs candidates on its own ballot line, threatening the Republican vote share from the right unless the Republicans also nominate the Conservative candidate.

The Conservative Party supports fiscally conservative policies, including lower social spending, lower progressive income taxes, lower corporate taxes, a right-to-work law and weaker union bargaining rights, and repeal of congestion pricing in New York City. The party supports socially conservative policies, including tighter abortion restrictions, restricted gender-affirming care for minors, a constitutional amendment to protect parental rights, school choice via charter schools, higher police funding, rolling back bail reforms, and ending New York's sanctuary city policy.

As of 2026, CPNYS is the 5th-largest political party in the United States by voter registration, below the Green Party and above the Peace and Freedom Party. (Note: Voter registration ranks are listed here. This list excludes the many different "Independent" parties, with which many voters register in error, and which usually do not run any competitive candidates.) By vote share, CPNYS is the 4th-largest party in New York State, giving it "Row D", behind the Working Families Party of New York. (Note: From 2010 to 2026, CPNYS held "Row C" on ballots because it received the 3rd-highest number of votes of any political party in the 2010, 2014, 2018, and 2022 New York gubernatorial elections. In 2026, CPNYS won the 4th-highest.)

== History ==
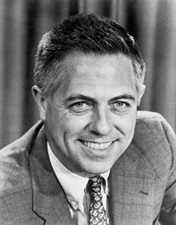
U.S. Senator James L. Buckley has been the most prominent elected official of the Conservative Party.

=== Origins ===
The Conservative Party of New York State was founded in 1962 by a group including J. Daniel Mahoney, Kieran O'Doherty, Charles E. Rice, Raymond R. Walker and Charles Edison. These conservatives created the party to oppose the perceived liberalism of the New York State Republican Party using New York fusion voting law to endorse and support more right-leaning candidates. In fusion voting, an electoral candidate can appear on multiple party lines in the same election.

=== Early history ===
In the 1965 NYC mayoral election, prominent conservative commentator William F. Buckley Jr. ran on the Conservative Party line, winning 13.4% of the vote, ahead of Republican John Lindsay's 11.0%. In the 1966 gubernatorial election, Conservative candidate Paul L. Adams won 8.5% (510,023 votes), while incumbent Republican Nelson Rockefeller won 44.6%, with Adams thus winning Row C for the Party.

In 1970, Buckley's brother James Buckley ran on the Conservative Party line and the Independent Alliance Party line. Buckley defeated Democratic Congressman Richard Ottinger and unelected incumbent Republican U.S. Senator Charles Goodell, receiving 39% of the vote. Buckley served one term in the Senate. In 1976, Buckley ran for reelection to the U.S. Senate as the candidate of the Republican and Conservative parties, losing to Democrat Daniel Patrick Moynihan. In 1978, registered Conservative William Carney, a member of the Suffolk County legislature, was elected to the United States House of Representatives in New York's 1st congressional district, a long-time Democratic stronghold on Long Island, after winning the Republican primary and running on both party lines. He eventually served four terms before retiring.

=== Fusion with the Republicans ===
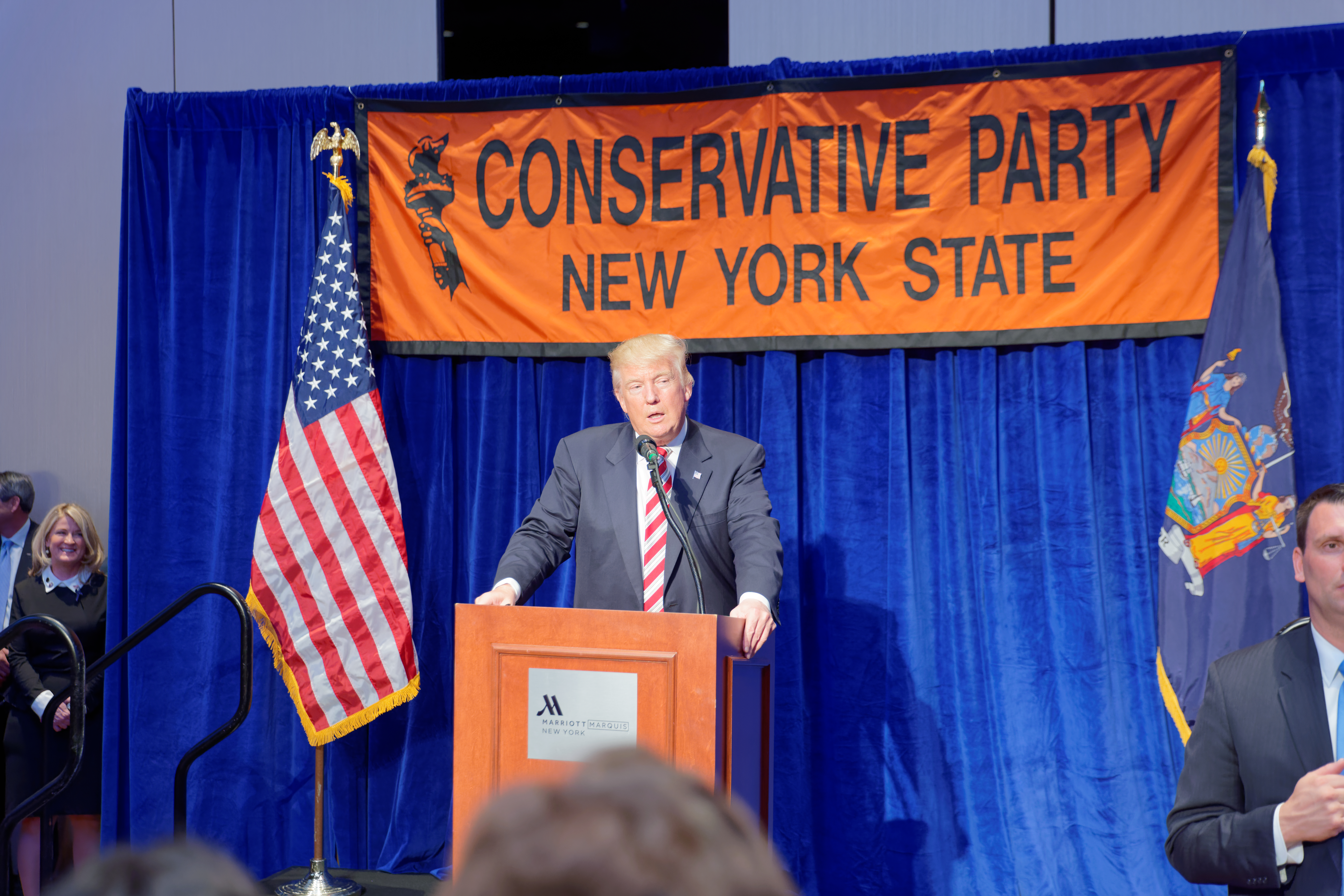
Donald Trump accepting the Conservative Party's nomination for President in 2016.

CPNYS has endorsed the Republican candidate in every presidential election from 1968 onward. CPNYS endorsed Donald Trump for the 2016, 2020, and 2024 presidential elections.

CPNYS has endorsed the Republican in every gubernatorial election from 1974 onward, except 1990. In 1982, CPNYS nominated Republican Lewis Lehrman, who was narrowly defeated by Democrat Mario Cuomo. In 1986, CPNYS nominated Republican Andrew P. O'Rourke, who was defeated by Cuomo in a landslide. In 1994, CPNYS endorsed Republican George Pataki, who won with 48.8% against incumbent governor Mario Cuomo, of which 6.3% (328,605, 3rd place) on the CPNYS line, earning it the "Row C" place. CPNYS re-endorsed Pataki in 1998 and 2002. In 2006, CPNYS endorsed Republican John Faso, who lost with 24.9% to Eliot Spitzer, of which 3.8% (168,654, 4th place) on the CPNYS line. In the 2010 gubernatorial election, CPNYS initially endorsed Rick Lazio, then endorsed Carl Paladino after they won the Republican primary. Paladino lost with 32.7% of the vote, of which 4.99% (232,215, 3rd place) on the CPNYS line, more than the Independence Party of New York, giving the CPNYS "Row C" (the 3rd place ballot position) for the first time since 1998. In 2014, CPNYS endorsed Republican Rob Astorino. In the 2018, the CPNYS executive committee endorsed Republican Marcus Molinaro over Deputy State Senate Majority Leader John A. DeFrancisco and did not consider Erie County Executive Joel Giambra. In 2022, CPNYS endorsed Republican Lee Zeldin, who lost with 46.3% of the vote to Kathy Hochul, of which 5.25% (313,187, 3rd place) on the CPNYS line.

=== Opposition to the Republicans ===
In 1980, the Conservative Party endorsed Al D'Amato in a U.S. Senate race in which he successfully challenged incumbent Sen. Jacob Javits in a Republican primary. D'Amato then narrowly prevailed in the general election over Democrat Elizabeth Holtzman; the 275,100 votes D'Amato received on the Conservative line exceeded his slim margin of victory.

CPNYS has long refused to support Republican candidates for Mayor of New York City. CPNYS declined to endorse Republican Rudy Giuliani in the 1993 and 1997 elections. In each election, Giuliani accepted the Liberal Party's endorsement. In 1993, CPNYS endorsed George Marlin; in 1997, it left its line blank. CPNYS declined to endorse Republican Michael Bloomberg, and instead ran its own mayoral candidates in the 2001, 2005, and 2009 elections.

In the 1990 gubernatorial election, CPNYS endorsed Herbert London, and declined to cross-endorse Republican Pierre Rinfret. CPNYS leaders cited Rinfret's support for abortion and fiscal policies for their decision to support London instead. London ran a strong campaign statewide and finished one percentage point behind Rinfret, while Democratic Governor Mario Cuomo easily won re-election.

In the 2009 NY-23 special election, the CPNYS endorsed Doug Hoffman over moderate Republican Dede Scozzafava, who CPNYS chair Long called a "nice lady who is too liberal." After Scozzafava suspended her campaign, prominent Republicans endorsed Hoffman. Scozzafava remained on the ballot. Democrat Bill Owens won 48.3%, Hoffman won 46.0%, and Scozzafava won 5.7%. The election received significant national attention, and was labelled "a referendum on President Barack Obama" and "a fight over the identity of the Republican Party."

Before the 2011 passage of Marriage Equality Act of New York, CPNYS chairman Michael Long stated that the party would not endorse any candidate who supported same-sex marriage. The CPNYS endorsed challengers to all Republicans who voted "yes".

== Strategy and reputation ==
In 2012, The New York Times stated that the Conservative Party had "a successful electoral record in a decidedly blue state in which the Conservatives have elbowed the Republican Party to the right". Also in 2012, the New York Post asserted that the Party had "helped the GOP maintain its majority in the state Senate, even as New York has turned an ever-deeper blue over the last half century" and added that it had "forced the state Republican Party to (sometimes) remember what it stood for—by threatening its power".

Rather than nominating its own candidates, the Conservative Party usually endorses the same candidates as the Republican Party and campaigns against the Democratic candidates. However, the party has withheld support from Republican candidates if it deems them too liberal. For example, the Conservative Party withheld its support from Republican Rudy Giuliani's fusion campaigns with endorsement from the Liberal Party for New York City mayor in 1989, 1993 and 1997. In the 2004 U.S. Senate election, the Conservative Party endorsed Marilyn O'Grady to oppose Republican candidate Howard Mills and incumbent Democratic Senator Charles Schumer. Also in 2004, the Party's decision to endorse Tom Dadey rather than incumbent Republican State Senator Nancy Larraine Hoffmann in State Senate District 49 helped bring about the victory of Democrat David Valesky in that race. After losing to Hoffmann in the Republican primary, Dadey—with the support of the Conservative Party and the Independence Party—remained in the race; Hoffmann lost the general election by 742 votes.

Following the passage of same-sex marriage legislation in 2011, the Conservative Party stated that it would withdraw support for any candidate who had voted for the bill; two Republican senators who voted for same-sex marriage—Roy McDonald and Stephen Saland—lost their seats in 2012.

The party has also endorsed Democratic candidates, including controversial former Buffalo mayor and presidential candidate Jimmy Griffin, who was initially elected mayor solely on the Conservative ticket but had Republican support as well for his subsequent campaigns. It also cross-endorsed such Democrats as Asms. Michael Cusick, Michael P. Kearns, and Robin Schimminger and former Capital District Congressman Michael McNulty. In 2022, the party endorsed Democratic Assembly members Simcha Eichenstein and Marianne Buttenschon, as well as Senator Simcha Felder.

== Officeholders from the New York Conservative Party ==
=== Federal office ===
- James L. Buckley, Senator, 1971–1977
- William Carney, U.S. Congressman, 1979–1987

=== State office ===
- Rosemary R. Gunning, Assemblywoman, 1969–1976
- Charles A. Jerabek, Assemblyman, 1969–1972
- Angela Wozniak, Assemblywoman, 2015–2016
- Joseph Lorigo, New York State Supreme Court justice, 2023–present

== Electoral history ==
=== New York State Offices ===
Governor & Lieutenant Governor						Comptroller						Attorney General					
Year	Nominee (Running-mate)	# votes	% votes	Fusion	Place	Year	Nominee	# votes	% votes	Fusion	Place	Year	Nominee	# votes	% votes	Fusion	Place
1962	David H. Jaquith (E. Vernon Carbonara)	141,877	2.44 / 100	Conservative	3rd of 5	1962	Thomas D. Cole	99,971	1.77 / 100	Conservative	3rd of 5	1962	Frederick S. Dennin	99,464	1.76 / 100	Conservative	3rd of 4
1966	Paul Adams (Kieran O'Doherty)	510,023	8.46 / 100	Conservative	3rd of 6	1966	Benjamin R. Crosby	331,467	5.80 / 100	Conservative	3rd of 5	1966	Mason L. Hampton	322,693	5.65 / 100	Conservative	3rd of 5
1970	Paul Adams (Edward F. Leonard)	422,514	7.03 / 100	Conservative	3rd of 6	1970	Anthony R. Spinelli	436,584	7.94 / 100	Conservative	3rd of 5	1970	Leo Kesselring	409,169	7.41 / 100	Conservative	3rd of 4
1974	Malcolm Wilson (Ralph G. Caso)	269,080	5.08 / 100	Republican	2nd of 8	1974	Bradley J. Hurd	244,701	5.02 / 100	Conservative	3rd of 7	1974	Edward F. Campbell	232,631	4.58 / 100	Conservative	3rd of 7
1978	Perry B. Duryea Jr. (Bruce F. Caputo)	242,972	5.10 / 100	Republican	2nd of 7	1978	Edward Regan	284,707	6.35 / 100	Republican	Elected	1978	Michael Roth	259,199	5.93 / 100	Republican	2nd of 5
1982	Lewis Lehrman (James L. Emery)	230,153	4.38 / 100	Republican	2nd of 7	1982	Edward Regan	252,716	5.33 / 100	Republican	Re-elected	1982	Frances A. Sclafani	178,477	3.76 / 100	Republican	2nd of 4
1986	Andrew P. O'Rourke (E. Michael Kavanagh)	152,306	3.55 / 100	Republican	2nd of 4	1986	Edward Regan	222,803	5.60 / 100	Republican	Re-elected	1986	Peter T. King	139,964	3.58 / 100	Republican	2nd of 3
1990	Herbert London (Anthony P. DiPerna)	827,614	20.40 / 100	Conservative	3rd of 7	1990	Edward Regan	391,743	9.93 / 100	Republican	Re-elected	1990	Bernard C. Smith	284,244	7.42 / 100	Republican	2nd of 3
1994	George Pataki (Betsy McCaughey)	328,605	6.31 / 100	Republican	Elected	1994	Herbert London	282,922	6.09 / 100	Republican	2nd of 5	1994	Dennis Vacco	305,961	6.57 / 100	Republican	Elected
1998	George Pataki (Mary Donohue)	348,727	7.40 / 100	Republican	Re-elected	1998	Bruce Blakeman	219,548	4.97 / 100	Republican	2nd of 5	1998	Dennis Vacco	302,223	6.99 / 100	Republican	2nd of 6
2002	George Pataki (Mary Donohue)	176,848	3.86 / 100	Republican	Re-elected	2002	John Faso	152,763	3.67 / 100	Republican	2nd of 5	2002	Dora Irizarry	124,657	3.02 / 100	Republican	2nd of 5
2006	John Faso (C. Scott Vanderhoef)	168,654	3.81 / 100	Republican	2nd of 5	2006	J. Christopher Callaghan	206,427	4.99 / 100	Republican	2nd of 5	2006	Jeanine Pirro	168,051	3.91 / 100	Republican	2nd of 5
2010	Carl Paladino (Gregory J. Edwards)	232,215	5.01 / 100	Republican	2nd of 6	2010	Harry Wilson	243,319	5.44 / 100	Republican	2nd of 5	2010	Dan Donovan	281,585	6.34 / 100	Republican	2nd of 5
2014	Rob Astorino (Christopher J. Moss)	250,634	6.56 / 100	Republican	2nd of 6	2014	Bob Antonacci	246,627	6.64 / 100	Republican	2nd of 5	2014	John P. Cahill	277,349	7.46 / 100	Republican	2nd of 4
2018	Marc Molinaro (Julie P. Killian)	253,624	4.16 / 100	Republican	2nd of 5	2018	Jonathan Trichter	231,380	3.85 / 100	Republican	2nd of 5	2018	Keith Wofford	257,090	4.29 / 100	Republican	2nd of 5
2022	Lee Zeldin (Alison Esposito)	313,187	5.31 / 100	Republican	2nd of 5	2022	Paul Rodriguez	292,337	5.07 / 100	Republican	2nd of 5	2022	Michael Henry	313,728	5.41 / 100	Republican	2nd of 5

New York Senate							New York Assembly						
Election	Nominees (and Endorsees)	Votes		Seats (Party and Endorsed)		Control	Election	Nominees (and Endorsees)	Votes		Seats (Party and Endorsed)		Control
Election	Nominees (and Endorsees)	No.	Share	No.	±	Control	Election	Nominees (and Endorsees)	No.	Share	No.	±	Control
1998	10 C 42 R, 1 D	324,864	8.09%	35 / 61	Steady	Republican	1998	31 C 90 R, 3 D	283,904	6.97%	50 / 150	Steady	Democratic
2000	9 C 39 R, 3 D	218,439	4.13%	36 / 61	▲1	Republican	2000	18 C 87 R, 11 D	186,850	3.42%	59 / 150	▲9	Democratic
2002	6 C 45 R, 3 D	195,095	5.37%	39 / 62	▲3	Republican							
2004	9 C 37 R, 1 D	179,229	3.15%	33 / 62	▼6	Republican							
2006	4 C 41 R, 1 D	172,472	4.40%	34 / 62	▲1	Republican							
2008	5 C 46 R	242,899	4.00%	29 / 62	▼5	Democratic	2008	12 C ?? R		%	0 / 150		Democratic
2010	7 C 47 R	266,523	6.11%	33 / 62	▲4	Republican							
2012	10 C 41 R	325,755	5.60%	30 / 63	▼3	Republican							
2014	8 C 38 R, 1 D	263,325	7.98%	34 / 63	▲4	Republican							
2016	7 C 41 R, 1 D	346,743	5.23%	32 / 63	▼2	Republican	2016	91 C ?? R, 1 D	306,448	4.62%	0 / 150	▼1	Democratic
2018	7 C 39 R, 1 D	253,452	4.50%	24 / 63	▼8	Democratic	2018	14 C ?? R	235,807	4.17%	0 / 150	Steady	Democratic
2020	5 C 38 R, 1 D	331,062	4.30%	21 / 63	▼3	Democratic	2020	9 C ?? R	301,261	3.93%	0 / 150	Steady	Democratic
2022	3 C 38 R, 1 D	314,379	5.75%	0 / 63		Democratic	2022	4 C ?? R	320,163	5.95%	0 / 150	Steady	Democratic

=== New York Federal Offices ===
U.S. President & Vice President						U.S. Senate						U.S. House of Representatives						
Year	Nominee (Running-mate)	# votes	% votes	Fusion	Place	Year	Nominee	# votes	% votes	Fusion	Place	Election	Nominees (and Endorsees)	Votes		Seats (Party and Endorsed)		Control
1962	Not Up					1962	Kieran O'Doherty	116,151	2.04 / 100	Conservative	3rd of 5	1962	Did Not Contest					Republican
1964	Did Not Contest					1964	Henry Paolucci	212,216	2.97 / 100	Conservative	3rd of 5	1964	10 C 7 R	52,274	0.77%	1 / 41	▲1	Democratic
1966	Not Up					1966	No Seat Up					1966	17 C 8 R	255,487	4.63%	1 / 41	Steady	Democratic
1968	Richard Nixon (Spiro Agnew)	No Electors Nominated		Republican	2nd of 6	1968	James L. Buckley	1,139,402	17.31 / 100	Conservative	3rd of 6	1968	25 C 10 R, 2 D	402,780	6.59%	6 / 41	▲5	Democratic
1970	Not Up					1970	James L. Buckley	2,179,640	36.91 / 100	Conservative	Elected	1970	18 C 17 R, 2 D	510,272	9.38%	10 / 41	▲4	Democratic
1972	Richard Nixon (Spiro Agnew)	368,136	5.14 / 100	Republican	Won	1972	No Seat Up					1972	15 C 20 R, 2 D	364,422	5.52%	11 / 39	▲1	Democratic
1974	Not Up					1974	Barbara A. Keating	822,584	15.93 / 100	Conservative	3rd of 8	1974	19 C 17 R, 1 D, 1 L	292,467	5.98%	8 / 39	▼3	Democratic
1976	Gerald Ford (Bob Dole)	274,878	4.21 / 100	Republican	2nd of 6	1976	James L. Buckley	311,494	4.93 / 100	Republican	2nd of 6	1976	16 C 19 R, 3 D	285,679	4.77%	9 / 39	▲1	Democratic
1978	Not Up					1978	No Seat Up					1978	14 C 20 R, 1 D	246,669	5.63%	8 / 39	▼1	Democratic
1980	Ronald Reagan (George H. W. Bush)	256,131	4.13 / 100	Republican	Won	1980	Al D'Amato	275,100	4.57 / 100	Republican	Elected	1980	9 C 26 R, 1 D	265,045	4.72%	12 / 39	▲4	Democratic
1982	Not Up					1982	Florence M. Sullivan	175,650	3.54 / 100	Republican	2nd of 4	1982	14 C 17 R	201,917	4.31%	8 / 34	▼4	Democratic
1984	Ronald Reagan (George H. W. Bush)	288,244	4.23 / 100	Republican	Won	1984	No Seat Up					1984	6 C 23 R	238,848	3.84%	11 / 34	▲3	Democratic
1986	Not Up					1986	Al D'Amato	212,101	4.73 / 100	Republican	Re-elected	1986	13 C 18 R	186,333	4.77%	9 / 34	▼2	Democratic
1988	George H. W. Bush (Dan Quayle)	243,457	3.75 / 100	Republican	2nd of 7	1988	Robert McMillan	189,226	3.13 / 100	Republican	2nd of 6	1988	8 C 18 R	210,052	3.82%	9 / 34	Steady	Democratic
1990	Not Up					1990	No Seat Up					1990	12 C 15 R, 1 D	272,292	7.44%	11 / 34	▲2	Democratic
1992	George H. W. Bush (Dan Quayle)	177,000	2.56 / 100	Republican	2nd of 6	1992	Al D'Amato	289,258	4.48 / 100	Republican	Re-elected	1992	8 C 19 R, 2 D	326,192	5.51%	10 / 34	▼1	Democratic
1994	Not Up					1994	Bernadette Castro	276,548	5.77 / 100	Republican	2nd of 6	1994	9 C 17 R, 1 D	295,779	6.41%	11 / 34	▲1	Democratic
1996	Bob Dole (Jack Kemp)	183,392	2.90 / 100	Republican	2nd of 9	1996	No Seat Up					1996	5 C 22 R, 1 D, 1 IND	261,849	4.80%	11 / 31	Steady	Democratic
1998	Not Up					1998	Al D'Amato	274,220	5.87 / 100	Republican	2nd of 6	1998	10 C 17 R	270,549	6.33%	11 / 31	Steady	Democratic
2000	George W. Bush (Dick Cheney)	144,797	2.12 / 100	Republican	2nd of 7	2000	Rick Lazio	191,141	2.82 / 100	Republican	2nd of 8	2000	9 C 18 R, 1 D	208,719	3.58%	11 / 31	Steady	Democratic
2002	Not Up					2002	No Seat Up					2002	6 C 19 R, 1 D	199,829	5.23%	10 / 29	▼1	Democratic
2004	George W. Bush (Dick Cheney)	155,574	2.10 / 100	Republican	2nd of 5	2004	Marilyn O'Grady	220,960	3.30 / 100	Conservative	3rd of 7	2004	5 C 19 R, 1 D	200,933	3.23%	8 / 29	▼2	Democratic
2006	Not Up					2006	John Spencer	179,287	3.99 / 100	Republican	2nd of 6	2006	3 C 18 R, 1 D	143,166	3.46%	7 / 29	▼1	Democratic
2008	John McCain (Sarah Palin)	170,475	2.23 / 100	Republican	2nd of 7	2008	No Seat Up					2008	5 C 21 R	195,874	3.06%	3 / 29	▼4	Democratic
2010	Not Up					2010	Jay Townsend	240,777	5.24 / 100	Republican	2nd of 4	2010	4 C 25 R	267,873	5.97%	8 / 29	▲5	Democratic
2010	Not Up					2010 SE	Joe DioGuardi	244,320	5.42 / 100	Republican	2nd of 7	2010	4 C 25 R	267,873	5.97%	8 / 29	▲5	Democratic
2012	Mitt Romney (Paul Ryan)	262,371	3.71 / 100	Republican	2nd of 6	2012	Wendy Long	241,124	3.61 / 100	Republican	2nd of 5	2012	1 C 21 R	257,809	3.99%	5 / 27	▼3	Democratic
2014	Not Up					2014	No Seat Up					2014	3 C 20 R	270,926	7.43%	8 / 27	▲3	Democratic
2016	Donald Trump (Mike Pence)	292,393	3.78 / 100	Republican	2nd of 4	2016	Wendy Long	267,622	3.62 / 100	Republican	2nd of 4	2016	5 C 17 R	337,178	4.73%	9 / 27	▲1	Democratic
2018	Not Up					2018	Chele Chiavacci Farley	246,171	4.07 / 100	Republican	2nd of 2	2018	2 C 17 R	207,094	3.57%	6 / 27	▼3	Democratic
2020	Donald Trump (Mike Pence)	295,657	3.43 / 100	Republican	2nd of 4	2020	No Seat Up					2020	3 C 21 R	315,541	3.84%	8 / 27	▲2	Democratic
2022	No Seat Up					2022	Joe Pinion	296,652	5.07 / 100	Republican	2nd of 3	2022	2 C 21 R	320,049	5.56%	11 / 27	▲3	Democratic
2024	Donald Trump (JD Vance)	321,733	3.89 / 100	Republican	2nd of 3	2024	Mike Sapraicone	329,070	4.12 / 100	Republican	2nd of 3	2024	1 C 22 R	331,892	4.19%	7 / 27	▼4	Democratic

== See also ==
- History of the Conservative Party of New York State
- Electoral history of the Conservative Party of New York State
- Conservative Party (United States)

== Bibliography ==
- Mahoney, J. Daniel (1968). Actions Speak Louder Than Words. New Rochelle, New York: Arlington House.
- Markmann, Charles Lam (1973). The Buckleys: A Family Examined. New York, New York: William Morrow. ISBN 9780688001520.
- Conservative Party Of New York State Records 1961-2016 (APAP-060). M. E. Grenander Department of Special Collections and Archives, University Libraries, University at Albany, State University of New York (hereafter referred to as the Conservative Party Of New York State Records).
