= Joseph Lorigo =

American politician

Joseph C. Lorigo

Justice of the New York State Supreme Court from the 8th Judicial district
- Incumbent
- Assumed office January 1, 2023

Member of the Erie County Legislature from the 10th district
- In office January 1, 2011 – January 1, 2023
- Preceded by: Christina Wleklinski Bove
- Succeeded by: James Malczewski

Personal details
- Born: November 18, 1981 (age 44) Buffalo, New York, United States
- Party: Conservative
- Spouse(s): Jean (divorced); Lindsay Bratek
- Children: 1
- Parent: Ralph Lorigo
- Education: Canisius College (BA); University at Buffalo (JD, MBA)
- Occupation: Attorney

Joseph C. Lorigo (born November 18, 1981) is an American politician and jurist. A Conservative, he served as a member of the Erie County, New York Legislature, representing Legislative District 10, which comprises rural towns in southeastern Erie County and the first-ring Buffalo suburb of West Seneca. He currently serves as a justice on the New York State Supreme Court.

== Early life and career ==
Lorigo was born in Buffalo, New York to Ralph Lorigo and Debbie (née Caruana) Lorigo. He earned a Bachelor's degree in Psychology from Canisius College in 2003, and then earned a Juris Doctor degree from the University at Buffalo Law School and a Master of Business Administration degree from the University at Buffalo School of Management in 2007.

After graduation, he worked as a lawyer at The Law Office of Ralph C. Lorigo.

Lorigo unsuccessfully ran for West Seneca town justice in 2010.

== Erie County Legislature ==
Lorigo won election to the Erie County, New York legislature in 2011, defeating incumbent Christina Wleklinski Bove. He won re-election in 2013, 2015, 2017, 2019 and 2021.

He caucused with the Republican legislators during his time in the legislature. After his first term, the legislature's Republican caucus elected Lorigo as the majority leader of the Erie County Legislature in 2014 until the Democratic Party took over control of the legislature in 2017. After the Democratic Party takeover of the legislature, Lorigo was elected as the minority leader.

Throughout his tenure, Lorigo worked for transparency and accountability in County government. He fought for lower taxes and improved investment in infrastructure.

== New York State Supreme Court ==
In 2022, Lorigo announced he was a candidate for a justice position on the New York State Supreme Court. That year, there were 5 positions open for election, however 4 of the 5 positions received cross-endorsements from both the Democratic and Republican parties, an often controversial practice allowed for in states that allow electoral fusion.

These cross endorsements guarantee victory for those 4 candidates. Lorigo was not one of the candidates who received a cross endorsement. Instead, he entered the race with only the backing of the Republican and Conservative parties.

Lorigo defeated Buffalo City Court Judge Shannon Heneghan on Election Day. His victory was considered the only Erie County "GOP gain" on Election Day 2022.

== Personal life ==
Prior to being elected to the State Supreme Court, Lorigo worked at the Law Offices of Ralph C. Lorigo, since 2007.

Joseph is married to Lindsay Bratek-Lorigo, who is currently a member of the Erie County Legislature.

They reside in West Seneca, New York, with their son, Charlie Lorigo.
