= Kieran O'Doherty =

American politician

Kieran E. O'Doherty

Commissioner of the Postal Regulatory Commission
- In office February 20, 1975 – October 14, 1980
- President: Gerald Ford; Jimmy Carter
- Preceded by: Carlos A. Villarreal
- Succeeded by: A. Lee Fritschler

Chair of the New York Conservative Party
- In office February 1962 – July 1962
- Preceded by: Position established
- Succeeded by: J. Daniel Mahoney

Personal details
- Born: Kieran Edward O'Doherty; 1927 New York City, U.S.
- Died: May 24, 1991 (aged 64) Salt Lake City, Utah, U.S.
- Party: Conservative
- Spouse: Mary O'Boyle
- Relatives: J. Daniel Mahoney (brother-in-law)

Kieran E. O'Doherty, also known as K. E. O'Doherty, was an American attorney. He was the founder and first chairman of the Conservative Party of New York.

== Early career ==
O'Doherty spent his entire life in Manhattan. He attended the City College of New York, graduating in 1950, and then attended Columbia University School of Law, where he attained his Juris Doctor in 1953.

He served as an Infantryman in the United States Army in World War II.

== Conservative Party of New York ==
In protest to Governor Nelson Rockefeller's liberal Republican policies in New York, O'Doherty and his brother-in-law, J. Daniel Mahoney, founded the Conservative Party of New York. The founding of the Conservative Party was also deemed necessary due to the foundation of the Liberal Party of New York.

O'Doherty was elected as the first chairman of the Conservative Party in February 1962. He served in this capacity until he resigned to run for the United States Senate, ultimately losing the election. to incumbent Republican Jacob Javits. Two years later, he unsuccessfully ran against future Mayor of New York City John Lindsay to represent New York's 17th congressional district in the United States House of Representatives.

His last candidacy for public office was for Lieutenant Governor of New York, as the running mate of Conservative gubernatorial candidate Paul Adams. This election was significant because it was the first time that the Conservative Party had overtaken the Liberal Party's position on the New York State ballot.

From 1969 until 1986, O'Doherty was elected to serve as the vice chair of the Conservative Party. He served in a federal position, appointed by President Ronald Reagan, and was confirmed by the United States Senate.

== Later life and death ==
O'Doherty operated his private law practice and real estate businesses with his wife, Mary.

He died in Salt Lake City on May 24, 1991.

Party political offices
Preceded by E. Vernon Carbonara	Conservative nominee for Lieutenant Governor of New York; 1966	Succeeded by Edward F. Leonard
