= J. Daniel Mahoney =

American judge (1931–1996)

John Daniel Mahoney

Judge of the United States Court of Appeals for the Second Circuit
- In office April 7, 1986 – October 23, 1996
- Appointed by: Ronald Reagan
- Preceded by: Seat established by 98 Stat. 333
- Succeeded by: Sonia Sotomayor

Chair of the New York Conservative Party
- In office July 1962 – April 1986
- Preceded by: Kieran O'Doherty
- Succeeded by: Serphin R. Maltese

Personal details
- Born: John Daniel Mahoney; September 7, 1931 Orange, New Jersey, U.S.
- Died: October 23, 1996 (aged 65) Derby, Connecticut, U.S.
- Party: New York State Conservative
- Domestic partner: Kathleen O'Doherty
- Relations: Kieran O'Doherty (brother-in-law)
- Children: 6
- Education: St. Bonaventure University (BA); Columbia University (LLB)

John Daniel Mahoney (September 7, 1931 – October 23, 1996) was a United States circuit judge of the United States Court of Appeals for the Second Circuit.

== Education and career ==
Born in Orange, New Jersey, Mahoney received a Bachelor of Arts degree, magna cum laude, from St. Bonaventure University in 1952. He received a Bachelor of Laws from Columbia Law School in 1955 as a James Kent Scholar. He was in the United States Coast Guard from 1955 to 1958. He was in private practice of law in New York City from 1958 to 1962 and from 1965 to 1986. He was the State Chairman of the New York Conservative Party from 1962 to 1986.

In 1985, Mahoney represented the National Review and its editor, William F. Buckley Jr., during the magazine's $16 million libel suit against The Spotlight.

=== Conservative Party of New York ===
Mahoney founded the Conservative Party of New York, with his brother-in-law, Kieran O'Doherty, who served as the new party's first chairman. The Conservative Party was established as a counterweight to the Liberal Party of New York, which endorsed Democrats on the political left. Mahoney authored Actions Speak Louder: The Story of the New York Conservative Party (Arlington House, 1968), which recounts the formation and early years of the party.

Further information regarding Mahoney and the formation of the Conservative Party and its role in the conservative movement through 2002 is available in Fighting the Good Fight, authored by George J. Marlin (St. Augustine's Press, 2002). Marlin was the Conservative Party mayoral nominee in 1993, having been defeated by the then-liberal Republican Rudy Giuliani.

== Federal judicial service ==
Mahoney was nominated by President Ronald Reagan on February 7, 1986, to the United States Court of Appeals for the Second Circuit, to a new seat created by 98 Stat. 333. He was confirmed by the United States Senate on March 27, 1986, and received commission on April 7, 1986. His service was terminated on October 23, 1996, due to death.

== Death ==
Mahoney died of a cerebral hemorrhage on October 23, 1996, in Derby, Connecticut.

== Sources ==
Party political offices
Preceded by Kieran O'Doherty	Chairman of the Conservative Party of New York; 1962–1986	Succeeded by Serphin R. Maltese
Legal offices
Preceded by Seat established by 98 Stat. 333	Judge of the United States Court of Appeals for the Second Circuit; 1986–1996	Succeeded by Sonia Sotomayor
