= Al D'Amato =

American attorney and politician (born 1937)

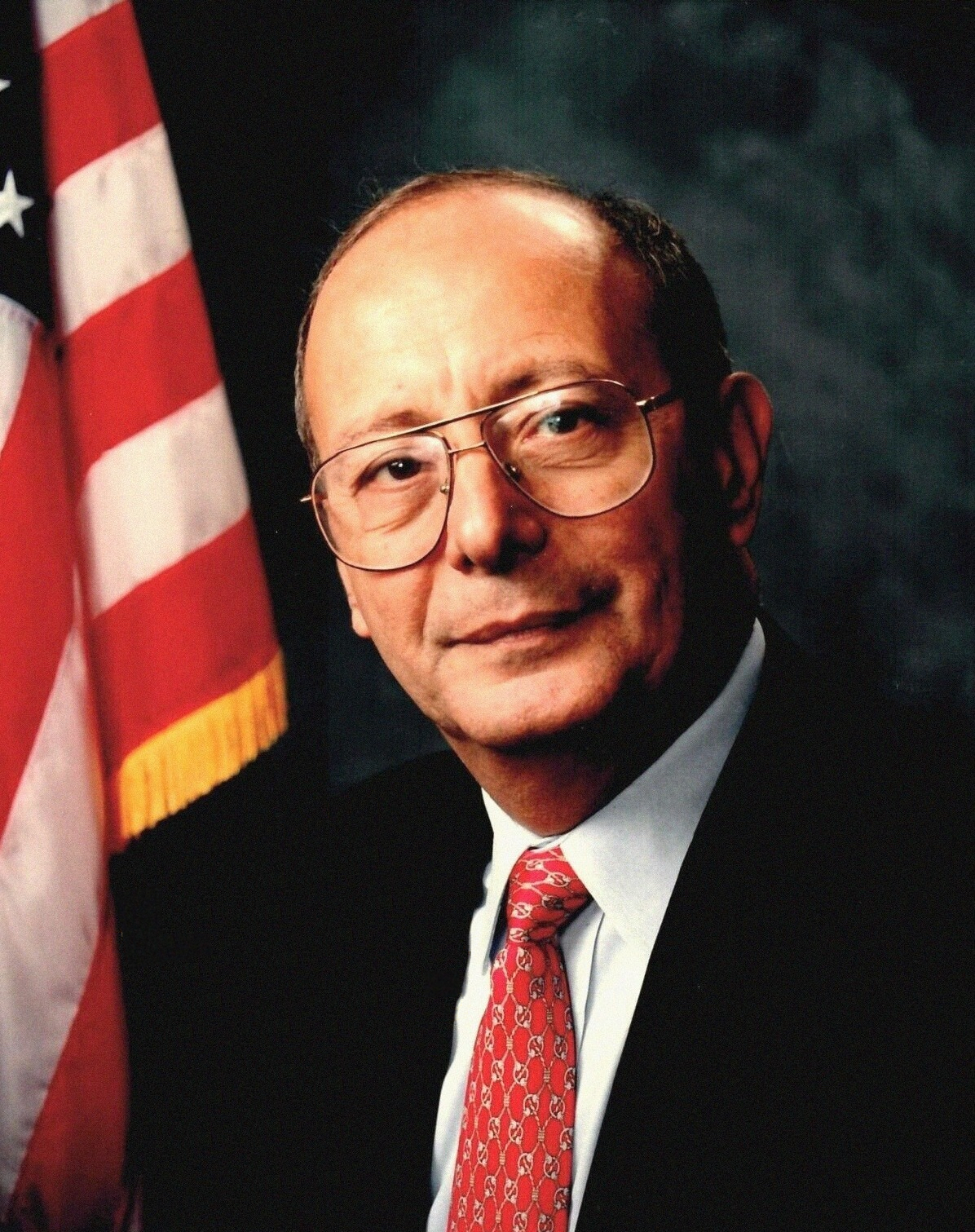
- Official portrait, c. 1990s

Chair of the Senate Banking Committee
- In office January 3, 1995 – January 3, 1999
- Preceded by: Donald Riegle
- Succeeded by: Phil Gramm

United States Senator from New York
- In office January 3, 1981 – January 3, 1999
- Preceded by: Jacob Javits
- Succeeded by: Chuck Schumer

Personal details
- Born: Alfonse Marcello D'Amato; August 1, 1937 (age 89) Brooklyn, New York, U.S.
- Party: Republican
- Spouses: Penelope Collenburg (m. 1960; div. 1995); Katuria Smith (m. 2004; sep. 2017)
- Children: 6
- Education: Syracuse University (BS, LLB)

Alfonse Marcello D'Amato (born August 1, 1937) is an American attorney, lobbyist, and Republican politician who represented the state of New York in the United States Senate from 1981 to 1999. From 1995 to 1999, he chaired the Senate Banking Committee. As of 2026, he is the most recent Republican to hold a Senate seat for New York. No Republican has represented New York in the Senate since he left office in 1999.

D'Amato was born in Brooklyn in 1937 and raised in Island Park, New York. He attended Syracuse University, receiving a law degree, before returning to Island Park and becoming involved in local Republican politics. Rising through the ranks, he held offices at the village, town, and county levels.

In 1980, D'Amato defeated four-term Republican incumbent Jacob Javits in the primary election for United States Senator. D'Amato went on to prevail in the general election, defeating Javits (who remained in the race on the Liberal Party ticket) and Democratic U.S. Representative Elizabeth Holtzman. He was re-elected in 1986 and 1992, but was defeated in 1998 by Chuck Schumer.

Following his departure from the Senate, D'Amato founded Park Strategies, a lobbying firm.

== Early life and education ==
D'Amato, of Italian ancestry, was born in Brooklyn on August 1, 1937, and raised in the small village of Island Park on Long Island. He is the son of Antoinette (Ciofarri) and Armand D'Amato, an insurance broker. D'Amato is a graduate of Syracuse University and Syracuse University College of Law. He is an attorney.

== Early political career ==
D'Amato served as public administrator of Nassau County from 1965 to 1968, and then served as Hempstead tax assessor in 1969. From 1971 to 1977, D'Amato was a Hempstead town supervisor. He was the presiding supervisor and the vice chair of the Nassau County Board of Supervisors from 1977 to 1980.

== U.S. Senate ==
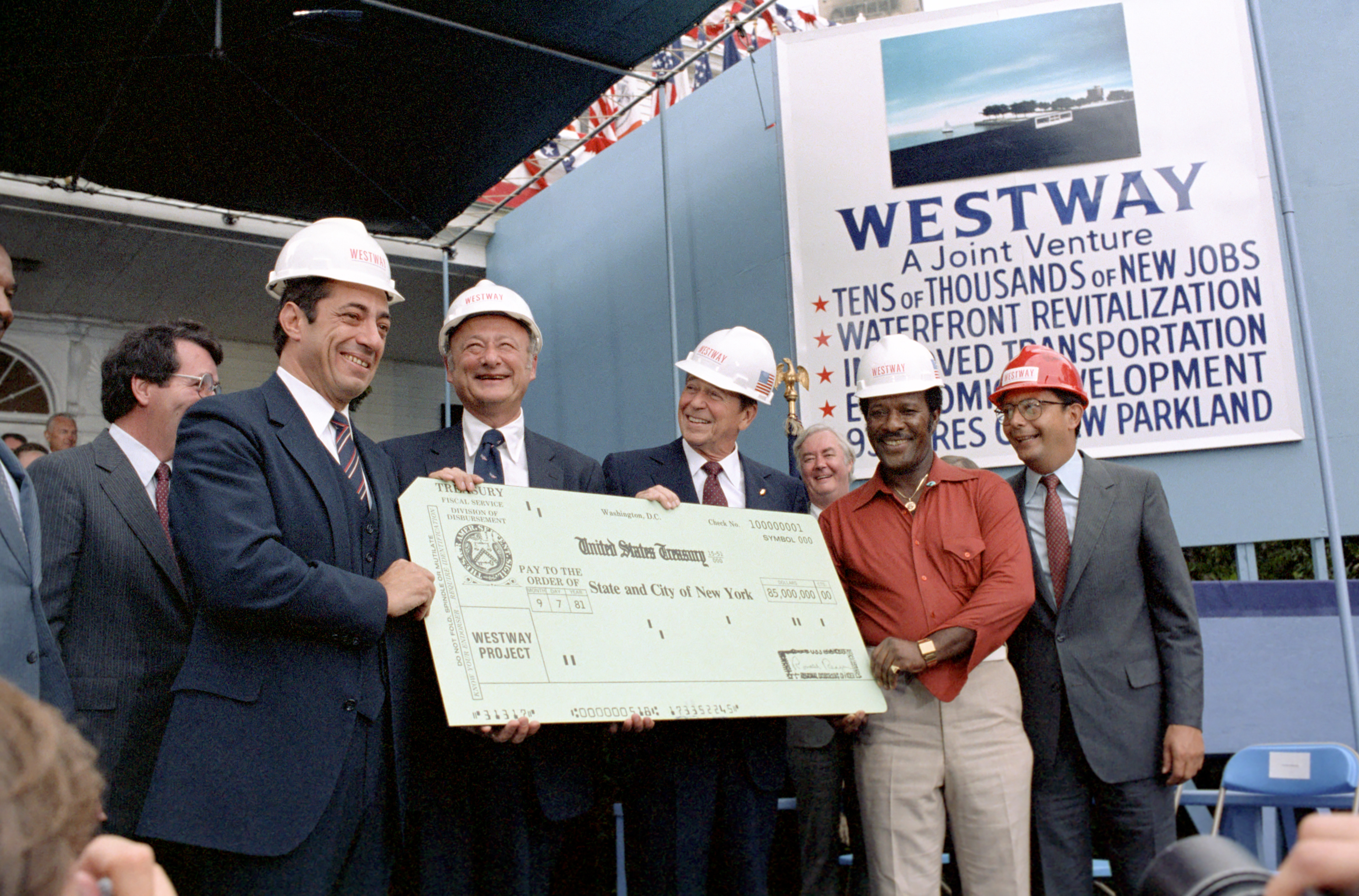
Ronald Reagan presenting New York leaders with a check for the Westway project in September 1981. From left to right: Raymond Donovan, Mario Cuomo, Ed Koch, Reagan, Daniel Patrick Moynihan, unknown, and D'Amato

Although a relatively obscure candidate, D'Amato defeated incumbent senator Jacob Javits by 56–44% in the 1980 Republican primary election following Javits' 1979 diagnosis of amyotrophic lateral sclerosis. Javits nevertheless pursued the seat on the Liberal Party ticket, splitting the left-wing vote in ordinarily liberal New York with Democratic Congresswoman Elizabeth Holtzman and leading to D'Amato's 45% plurality victory. D'Amato was re-elected in 1986 and 1992, but lost in 1998 to Democratic congressman Chuck Schumer, a future Senate Majority Leader.

D'Amato drew the nickname "Senator Pothole" for his delivery of "constituent services", helping citizens with their individual cases. While some New Yorkers meant the nickname as a pejorative, others saw it as a positive affirmation of his attention to getting things done.

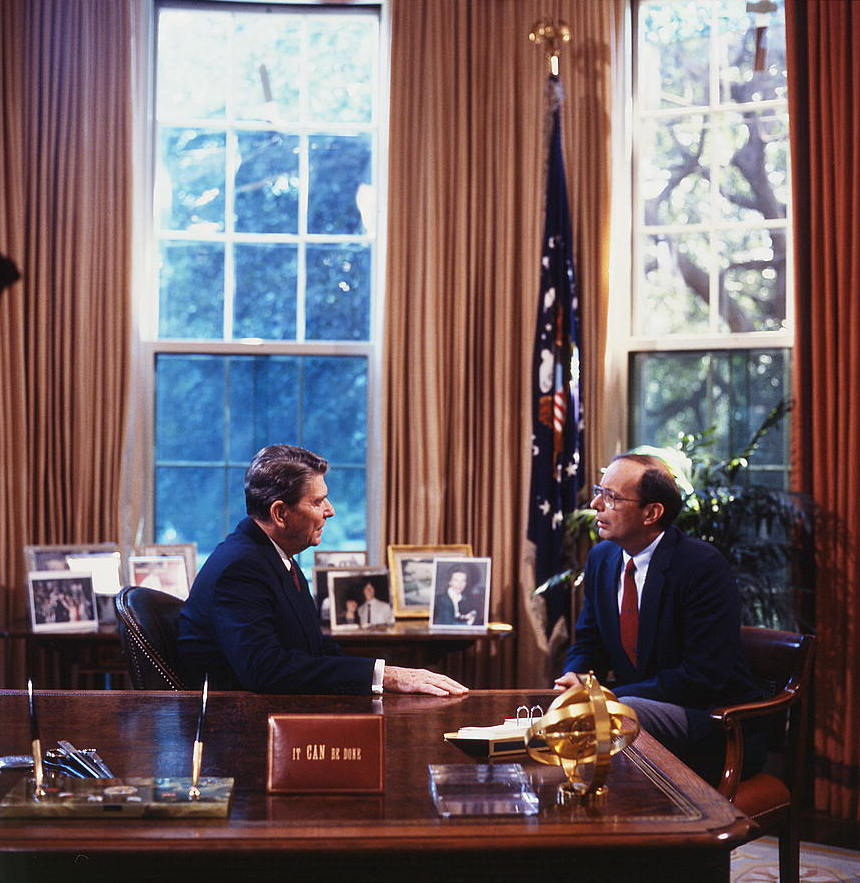
D'Amato with Ronald Reagan in 1986

D'Amato holds the record for the third- and eleventh-longest filibusters ever recorded in the U.S. Senate. He is remembered for his unique and rather comical filibusters. In 1986, in a filibuster against a military bill that lasted 23 1/2 hours, he read the District of Columbia telephone book. In 1992, D'Amato filibustered a bill that would have caused the loss of 750 jobs in upstate New York by singing "South of the Border (Down Mexico Way)".

D'Amato is remembered for presenting a poster of a "Taxasaurus Rex", which he then stabbed with an oversized pencil.

D'Amato voted in favor of the bill establishing Martin Luther King Jr. Day as a federal holiday and the Civil Rights Restoration Act of 1987. In 1987, D'Amato voted to confirm Robert Bork to the U.S. Supreme Court, but Bork's nomination was rejected. In 1991, D'Amato voted to confirm Clarence Thomas to the U.S. Supreme Court; Thomas was confirmed by the Senate.

D'Amato was chair of the Senate Committee on Banking, Housing and Urban Affairs and was a member of the Senate Finance Committee. As a member of the former, he became a leading critic of the Clinton administration regarding the Whitewater scandal, and during 1995 and 1996 he chaired the hearings-heavy Senate Special Whitewater Committee. As a member of the latter, he facilitated the lawsuit of Holocaust survivors trying to recover relatives' funds from accounts in Swiss banks.

D'Amato was influential in New York Republican politics and was considered the "boss" of the state party during his Senate years. For example, he played a leading role in recruiting George Pataki and in securing him the Republican nomination in the gubernatorial race of 1994.

D'Amato was known for being fairly conservative, a reflection of then-strongly conservative Nassau County and Long Island. He strongly supported the conservative positions of his party on "law and order" issues such as capital punishment and harsh penalties for drug offenses. On some issues, he agreed with the opposition: in 1993, D'Amato was one of only three Republicans to vote in favor of allowing gays to serve openly in the U.S. military. While D'Amato voted for the Defense of Marriage Act in 1996, he was among the minority of Republicans to vote for the Employment Non-Discrimination Act that year. In 1998, the LGBTQ advocacy group Human Rights Campaign endorsed D'Amato for re-election over socially liberal Democratic Congressman Chuck Schumer.

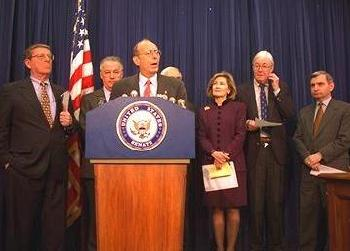
Members of the Senate Budget Committee announce an agreement on mass transit funding legislation in 1998. From left to right: Pete Domenici, Paul Sarbanes, D'Amato, Kay Bailey Hutchison, Daniel Patrick Moynihan, and Jack Reed

D'Amato's 54–44% loss in 1998 was attributed to a lack of support among moderate voters in New York City, the site of opponent Schumer's U.S. congressional district.

== Later career ==
=== Columnist and analyst ===
Shortly before leaving office, D'Amato published his book of recollections, Power, Pasta and Politics. After retiring from politics in 1999, he became a regular columnist for George magazine until it ceased publication in 2001. He also emerged as an analyst for Fox News. A notable on-air incident occurred when D'Amato took offense at comments of GOP strategist Jack Burkman. Saying he agreed with Burkman's suggestion that the Postal Service should be privatized; D'Amato slammed him for his characterizations of postal workers, which D'Amato said were racist.

As of 2023, D'Amato is a regular contributor at Red Apple Media’s 77WABC, hosted by John Catsimatidis.

=== Presidential politics ===
==== 2008 ====
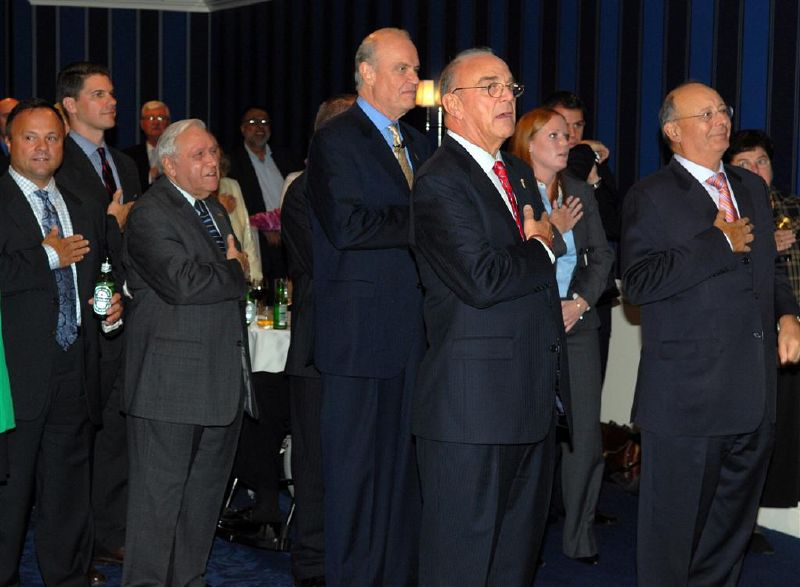
Fred Thompson, Mike Long, and D'Amato in 2007

On June 12, 2007, the former three-term Senator from New York endorsed one-time Senate colleague from Tennessee Fred Thompson for the Republican nomination for president in 2008. In explaining his endorsement of Thompson, former Senator D'Amato called Thompson "a real conservative", not a candidate who adopted conservative positions in preparation for an election. D'Amato added, "Fred Thompson is the kind of candidate our party can unify behind and support wholeheartedly." On January 22, 2008, after poor showings from Thompson, D'Amato threw his support to John McCain for the 2008 presidential election, saying: "If you want to win in November, John McCain is the man".

==== 2012 ====
On March 14, 2012, D'Amato endorsed Mitt Romney for president. He and Peter Kalikow appeared with Romney at fundraisers in New York leading up to the election.

==== 2016 ====
On August 26, 2015, D'Amato endorsed Ohio Governor John Kasich for president of the United States over Jeb Bush and former New York Gov. George Pataki. While stating that the Republican Party needed to move past the Bush family, he credited Pataki as a "wonderful guy", but cited Kasich's experience in balancing the budget as a congressman in the 1990s and in Ohio. Following Donald Trump's victory in the 2016 general election, D'Amato stated: "I am in great spirits. I feel great for the people of our country." He urged Trump to appoint Rudy Giuliani as Attorney General, stating: "I think one great appointment and someone who will follow the law and not bend the law as he or she sees fit as the attorney general is Rudy Giuliani..."

==== 2020 ====
In 2020, D'Amato supported Trump for re-election against Democrat Joe Biden.

==== 2024 ====
Leading up to the 2024 election, D'Amato opined that New York donors would be reluctant to donate to Trump's campaign. He also criticized Trump's post-election behavior. In 2024, however, D'Amato expressed support for Trump. He also asserted that Tim Scott should be chosen as the Republican vice presidential nominee.

== Personal life ==
D'Amato married Penelope Collenburg in 1960. The couple had four children before divorcing in 1995.

D'Amato married Katuria Smith in 2004. The couple had a son and a daughter. Katuria D'Amato filed for divorce on October 3, 2017. Al D'Amato won emergency custody of the couple's children, claiming that Katuria D'Amato was mentally ill following an episode in which she was detained by authorities. In 2018, Katuria D'Amato released a video of Al D'Amato shouting obscenities at her while she was hospitalized. In the midst of the couple's custody battle, Katuria D'Amato filed a $100 million lawsuit against Al D'Amato for alleged racketeering.

In 2017, D'Amato made headlines when he was removed from a New York-bound JetBlue flight after reportedly trying to rally the passengers against the flight crew. The plane was delayed six times. He later issued a statement apologizing for his behavior.

On November 20, 2020, D'Amato was hospitalized with COVID-19. Five days later, he was released from the hospital.

== Electoral history ==
1980 U.S. Senate Republican primary in New York
Party	Candidate	Votes	%
Republican	Al D’Amato	323,468	55.7
Republican	Jacob Javits (incumbent)	257,433	44.3
Total votes		580,901	100.0

1980 U.S. Senate election in New York
Party	Candidate	Votes	%
Republican	Al D’Amato	2,699,652	44.9
Democratic	Elizabeth Holtzman	2,618,661	43.5
Liberal	Jacob Javits (incumbent)	664,544	11.1
Total votes		5,982,857	100.0
Republican hold			

1986 U.S. Senate election in New York
Party	Candidate	Votes	%
Republican	Al D’Amato (incumbent)	2,378,197	53.0
Democratic	Mark Green	1,723,216	38.4
Total votes		4,101,413	100.0
Republican hold			

1992 U.S. Senate election in New York
Party	Candidate	Votes	%
Republican	Al D’Amato (incumbent)	3,166,994	49.0
Democratic	Robert Abrams	3,086,200	47.8
Total votes		6,253,194	100.0
Republican hold			

1998 U.S. Senate election in New York
Party	Candidate	Votes	%
Democratic	Chuck Schumer	2,551,065	54.6
Republican	Al D’Amato (incumbent)	2,058,988	44.1
Total votes		4,610,053	100.0
Democratic gain from Republican			

== Book ==
- D'Amato, Alfonse (1995). Power, Pasta, and Politics: The World According to Senator Al D'Amato. New York: Hyperion. ISBN 978-0-786-86045-6.

== See also ==
Party political offices
Preceded by Jacob Javits	Republican nominee for U.S. Senator from New York (Class 3); 1980, 1986, 1992, 1998	Succeeded by Howard Mills III
Preceded by Barbara Keating	Conservative nominee for U.S. Senator from New York (Class 3); 1980, 1986, 1992, 1998	Succeeded by Marilyn O'Grady
Preceded by Phil Gramm	Chair of the National Republican Senatorial Committee; 1995–1997	Succeeded by Mitch McConnell
U.S. Senate
Preceded by Jacob Javits	U.S. Senator (Class 3) from New York; 1981–1999; Served alongside: Pat Moynihan	Succeeded by Chuck Schumer
Preceded by Dante Fascell	Chair of the Joint Helsinki Commission; 1985–1987	Succeeded by Steny Hoyer
Preceded by Jake Garn	Ranking Member of the Senate Banking Committee; 1993–1995	Succeeded by Paul Sarbanes
Preceded by Donald Riegle	Chair of the Senate Banking Committee; 1995–1999	Succeeded by Phil Gramm
Preceded by Chris Smith	Chair of the Joint Helsinki Commission; 1997–1999	Succeeded by Chris Smith
U.S. order of precedence (ceremonial)
Preceded by Judd Gregg as Former U.S. Senator	Order of precedence of the United States as Former U.S. Senator	Succeeded by Richard Burr as Former U.S. Senator
