= 1976 United States Senate election in New York =

- November 2, 1976
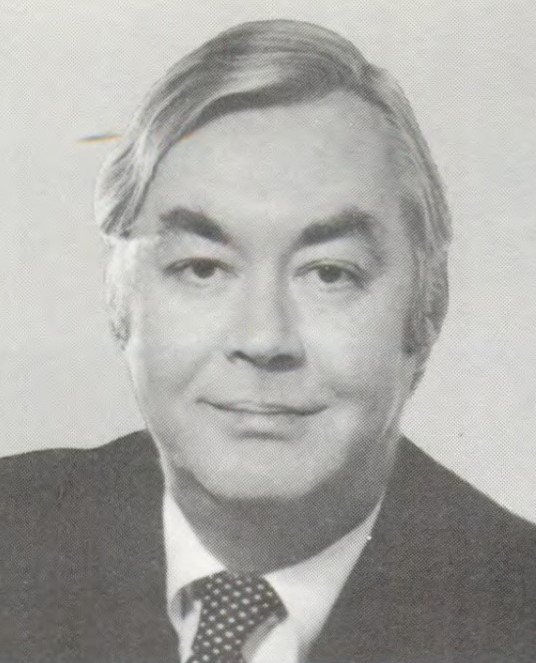

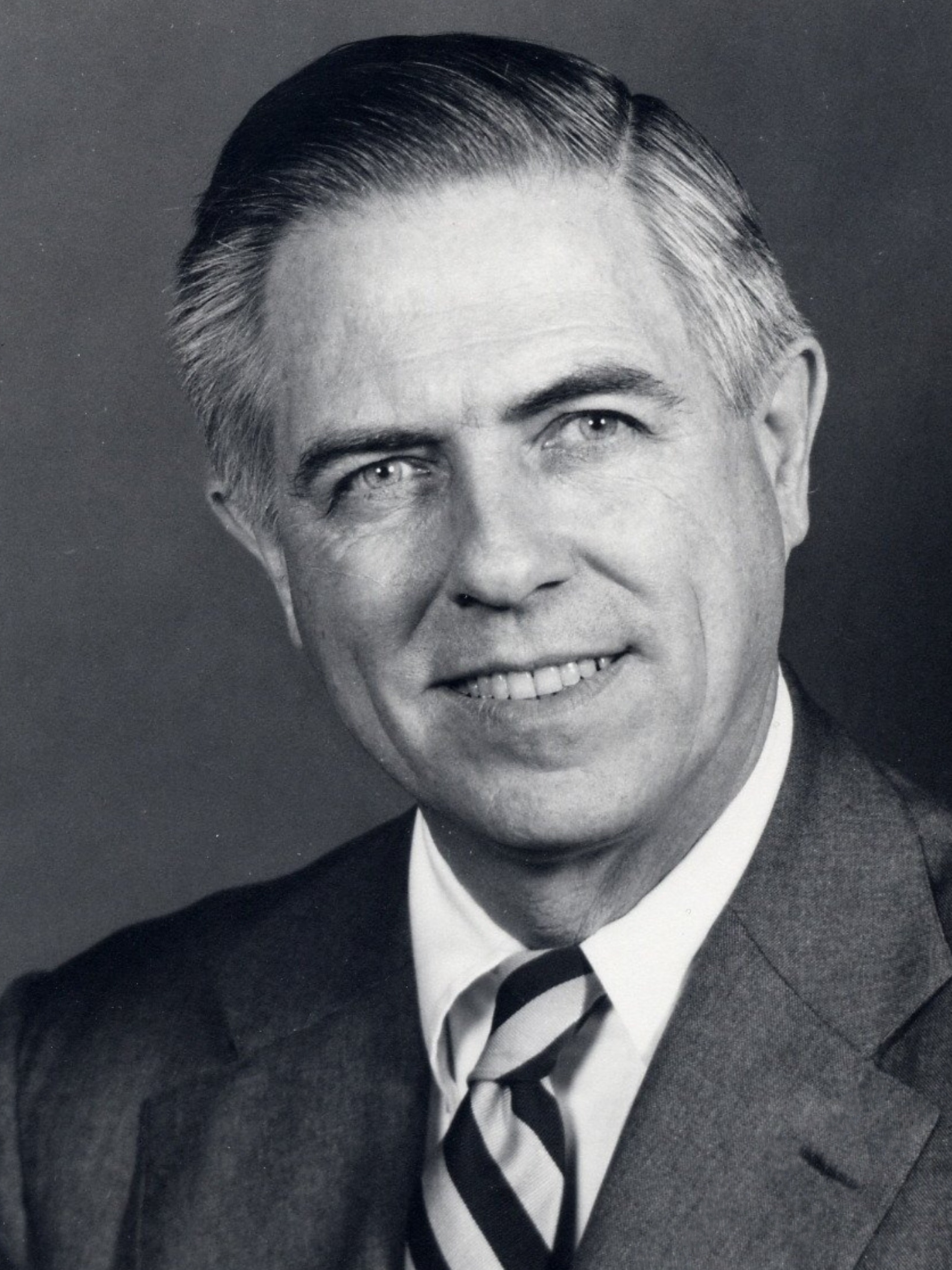
Nominee	Pat Moynihan	James Buckley
Party	Democratic	Republican
Alliance	Liberal	Conservative
Popular vote	3,422,594	2,836,633
Percentage	54.17%	44.89%
- County results Moynihan: 50–60% 60–70% 70–80% Buckley: 50–60% 60–70% 70–80%
U.S. senator before election
James L. Buckley
Republican
Elected U.S. Senator
Pat Moynihan
Democratic

The 1976 United States Senate election in New York was held on November 2, 1976. Republican incumbent James L. Buckley ran for re-election to a second term in office but was defeated by Democratic nominee Pat Moynihan, former White House aide and ambassador to the United Nations and India. As of 2026, this is the last time an incumbent lost re-election to this seat.

Primary elections were held on September 14. In the sharply contested Democratic primary, Moynihan narrowly defeated Bella Abzug for the nomination. Buckley, who had been elected as a Conservative but quickly joined the Republican caucus in the Senate, easily defeated a challenge from Peter A. Peyser.

== Republican primary ==
=== Candidates ===
- James L. Buckley, incumbent U.S. senator since 1971
- Peter A. Peyser, U.S. representative from Irvington

=== Results ===
1976 Republican U.S. Senate primary
Party	Candidate	Votes	%
Republican	James L. Buckley (incumbent)	242,257	70.45
Republican	Peter Peyser	101,629	29.55
Total votes		343,886	100.00

== Democratic primary ==
=== Candidates ===
- Bella Abzug, U.S. representative from the West Side of Manhattan
- Ramsey Clark, former United States Attorney General and nominee for Senate in 1974
- Abraham Hirschfeld, real estate developer
- Pat Moynihan, former U.S. ambassador to the United Nations and U.S. ambassador to India
- Paul O'Dwyer, former New York City Council president and nominee for Senate in 1968

=== Convention ===
1976 Democratic Party convention
Party	Candidate	Votes	%
Democratic	Paul O'Dwyer		32.50%
Democratic	Pat Moynihan		31.10%
Democratic	Bella Abzug		28.70%
Democratic	Ramsey Clark		7.00%
Democratic	Abraham Hirschfeld		0.70%
Total votes			100.00%

=== Primary results ===
1976 Democratic U.S. Senate primary
Party	Candidate	Votes	%
Democratic	Pat Moynihan	333,697	36.41%
Democratic	Bella Abzug	323,705	35.32%
Democratic	Ramsey Clark	94,191	10.28%
Democratic	Paul O'Dwyer	82,689	9.02%
Democratic	Abraham Hirschfeld	82,331	8.98%
Total votes		916,613	100.00%

== General election ==
=== Candidates ===
- Herbert Aptheker, historian and activist (Communist)
- Elijah C. Boyd (U.S. Labor)
- James L. Buckley, incumbent U.S. senator since 1971 (Republican and Conservative)
- Marcia Gallo (Socialist Workers)
- Daniel Patrick Moynihan, former U.S. Ambassador to the United Nations and to India (Democratic and Liberal)
- Martin E. Nixon (Libertarian)

=== Results ===
1976 U.S. Senate election in New York
Party	Candidate	Votes	%	±%
Democratic	Pat Moynihan	3,238,511	51.26%	▲14.49
Liberal	Pat Moynihan	184,083	2.91%	▼0.91
Total	Pat Moynihan	3,422,594	54.17%	N/A
Republican	James L. Buckley (incumbent)	2,525,139	39.96%	▲20.00
Conservative	James L. Buckley (incumbent)	311,494	4.93%	▼31.98
Total	James L. Buckley (incumbent)	2,836,633	44.89%	N/A
Communist	Herbert Aptheker	25,141	0.40%	▲0.37
Socialist Workers	Marcia Gallo	16,350	0.26%	▲0.20
Libertarian	Martin E. Nixon	10,943	0.17%	▲0.17
U.S. Labor	Elijah C. Boyd	6,716	0.11%	▲0.11
Total votes		6,318,377	100.00%	
Democratic gain from Republican				

== See also ==
- 1976 United States Senate elections
