= 1986 United States Senate election in New York =

- November 4, 1986
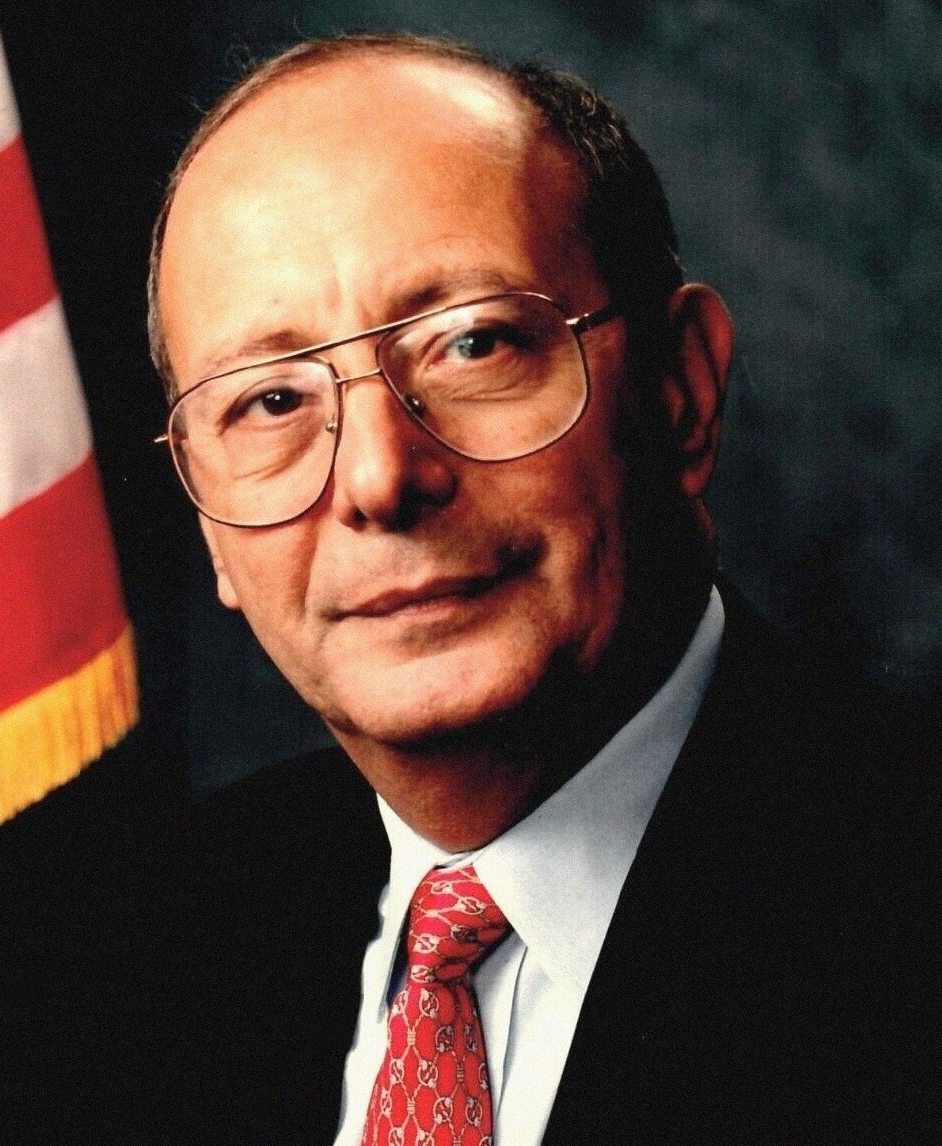

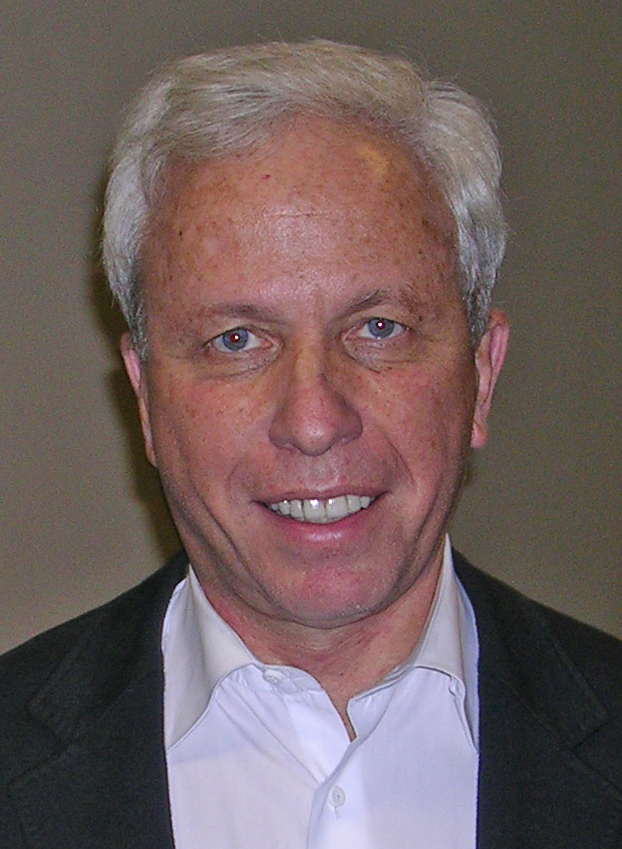
Nominee	Al D'Amato	Mark Green
Party	Republican	Democratic
Alliance	Conservative; Right to Life
Popular vote	2,378,197	1,723,216
Percentage	53.03%	38.42%
- County results D'Amato: 40–50% 50–60% 60–70% 70–80% Green: 40–50% 50–60% 60–70%
U.S. senator before election
Al D'Amato
Republican
Elected U.S. Senator
Al D'Amato
Republican

The 1986 United States Senate election in New York took place on November 4, 1986, alongside other elections to the United States Senate in other states as well as elections to the United States House of Representatives and various state and local elections.

Incumbent Republican U.S. Senator Al D'Amato won re-election to a second term by a wide margin versus Democratic opponent Mark Green. D'Amato's performance was credited to his strength in suburban areas. During his Senate campaign, Green refused to accept money from special interest groups' political action committees (PACs) – which had accounted for 25% of all campaign spending in Congressional campaigns in 1984 – denouncing PACs as "legalized bribery."

Former Representative and 1984 vice-presidential nominee Geraldine Ferraro had been widely expected to run for Senate. However, Ferraro chose to forgo a candidacy in December 1985 due to legal problems facing her and her husband.

== Candidates ==
=== Republican ===
- Al D'Amato, incumbent U.S. Senator

=== Democratic ===
==== Role of Geraldine Ferraro ====
In the run-up to the Senate contest, former Representative Geraldine Ferraro was widely expected to run against D'Amato. Despite her presence on the losing presidential ticket in 1984, her high public stature led commentators to believe she'd be a formidable Senate candidate. In 1985, one year before the election, Ferraro did groundwork in Upstate New York towards that end.

However, in December 1985, she said she would not run. She explained that she would not run due to an ongoing U.S. Justice Department probe on her and her husband's finances stemming from 1984 campaign revelations.

=== Green vs. Dyson contest ===
In her absence, two major Democrats entered the race:

- Mark Green, Chief Speechwriter for U.S. Senator Gary Hart and former congressional candidate
- John S. Dyson, Chairman of the New York Power Authority (later the nominee of the Liberal Party)

The moderate Dyson was supported by many high-profile Democrats, and received the behind-the-scenes support of Governor Mario Cuomo. Green received the support of eight Democratic members of Congress. Despite spending $6 million on his campaign to the $600,000 raised by Green, Dyson was defeated by the more liberal Green in the primary. Upon hearing news of his victory, Green boasted:

"We were outspent by 800 percent and won by 600 percent. No one has ever been outspent in a primary by $6 million to $800,000 and still won.''

=== Endorsements ===
Al D'Amato (R)

Newspapers

- Democrat and Chronicle
- Gannett Westchester Newspapers
- Star-Gazette
- Staten Island Advance
- Times-Union
Mark Green (D)

U.S. Representatives

- Gary L. Ackerman
- Thomas J. Manton
- Robert Mrazek
- Major R. Owens
- James H. Scheuer
- Stephen J. Solarz
- Edolphus Towns
- Ted Weiss

Newspapers

- The Post-Star
John S. Dyson (L)

State legislators

- Chester J. Straub

== Results ==
1986 U.S. Senate election in New York
Party	Candidate	Votes	%	±%
Republican	Al D'Amato (incumbent)	2,030,260	45.27%	▲7.50
Conservative	Al D'Amato	212,101	4.73%	▲0.16
Right to Life	Al D'Amato	135,386	3.02%	▲0.51
Total	Al D'Amato (incumbent)	2,378,197	53.03%	▲8.15
Democratic	Mark Green	1,723,216	38.42%	▼5.12
Liberal	John S. Dyson	60,099	1.34%	▼9.71
New Alliance	Fred Newman	10,559	0.24%	N/A
Socialist Workers	Michael Shur	7,376	0.16%	▲0.11
Various	Others	305,412	6.81%	N/A
Total votes		4,484,859	100.00%	
Republican hold		Swing		

== See also ==
- 1986 United States Senate elections
