= 1988 United States Senate election in New York =

- November 8, 1988
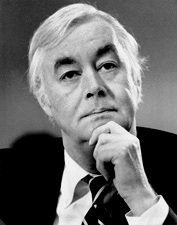

Nominee	Daniel Patrick Moynihan	Robert McMillan
Party	Democratic	Republican
Popular vote	4,048,649	1,875,784
Percentage	67.02%	31.05%
- County results Moynihan: 40–50% 50–60% 60–70% 70–80% 80–90% McMillan: 50–60%
U.S. senator before election
Pat Moynihan
Democratic
Elected U.S. Senator
Pat Moynihan
Democratic

The 1988 United States Senate election in New York was held on November 8, 1988. Incumbent Democratic U.S. Senator Daniel Patrick Moynihan won re-election to a third term in a landslide, versus Republican nominee Robert McMillan. McMillan, who ran a "low-budget" challenge to the two-term senator, was largely ignored by Moynihan in the public sphere.

== Major candidates ==
=== Democratic nomination ===
==== Nominee ====
- Daniel Patrick Moynihan, incumbent U.S. senator since 1977

=== Republican nomination ===
Lewis Lehrman, a businessman who narrowly lost to Mario Cuomo in the 1982 gubernatorial election, was speculated to mount a run against Moynihan. However, he did not end up mounting a bid for Senate. With no major Republican willing to challenge Moynihan, the party acclaimed businessman Robert McMillan as its nominee.

==== Nominee ====
- Robert R. McMillan, business executive of Avon Products and Reagan Administration adviser

== Results ==
General election results
Party	Candidate	Votes	%
Democratic	Daniel Patrick Moynihan (incumbent)	4,048,649	67.02%
Republican	Robert R. McMillan	1,875,784	31.05%
Right to Life	Adelle R. Nathanson	64,845	1.07%
Independent Progressive	Charlene Mitchell	14,770	0.24%
Workers World	Lydia Bayoneta	13,573	0.22%
Libertarian	William P. McMillen	12,064	0.20%
Socialist Workers	James E. Harris	11,239	0.19%
Democratic hold			

== See also ==
- 1988 United States Senate elections
