= 1980 United States Senate election in New York =

- November 4, 1980
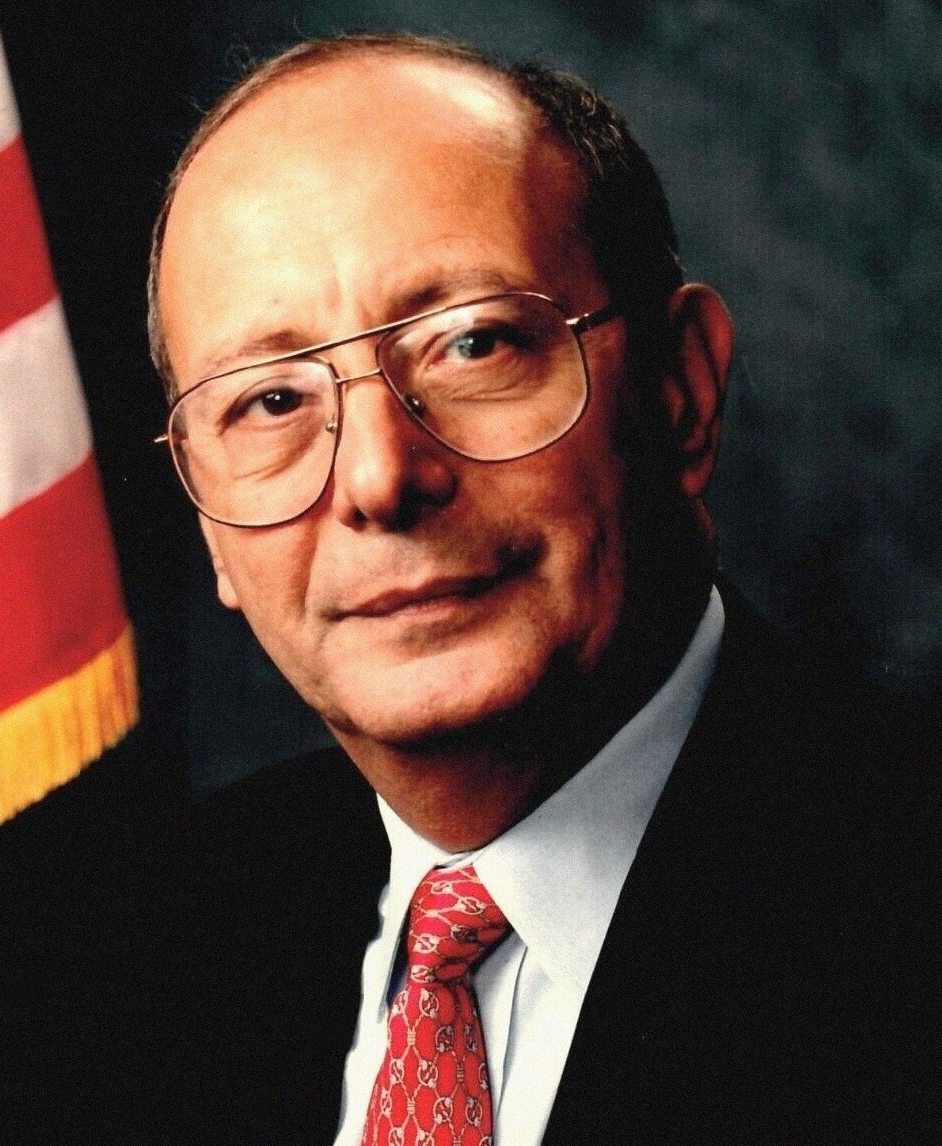

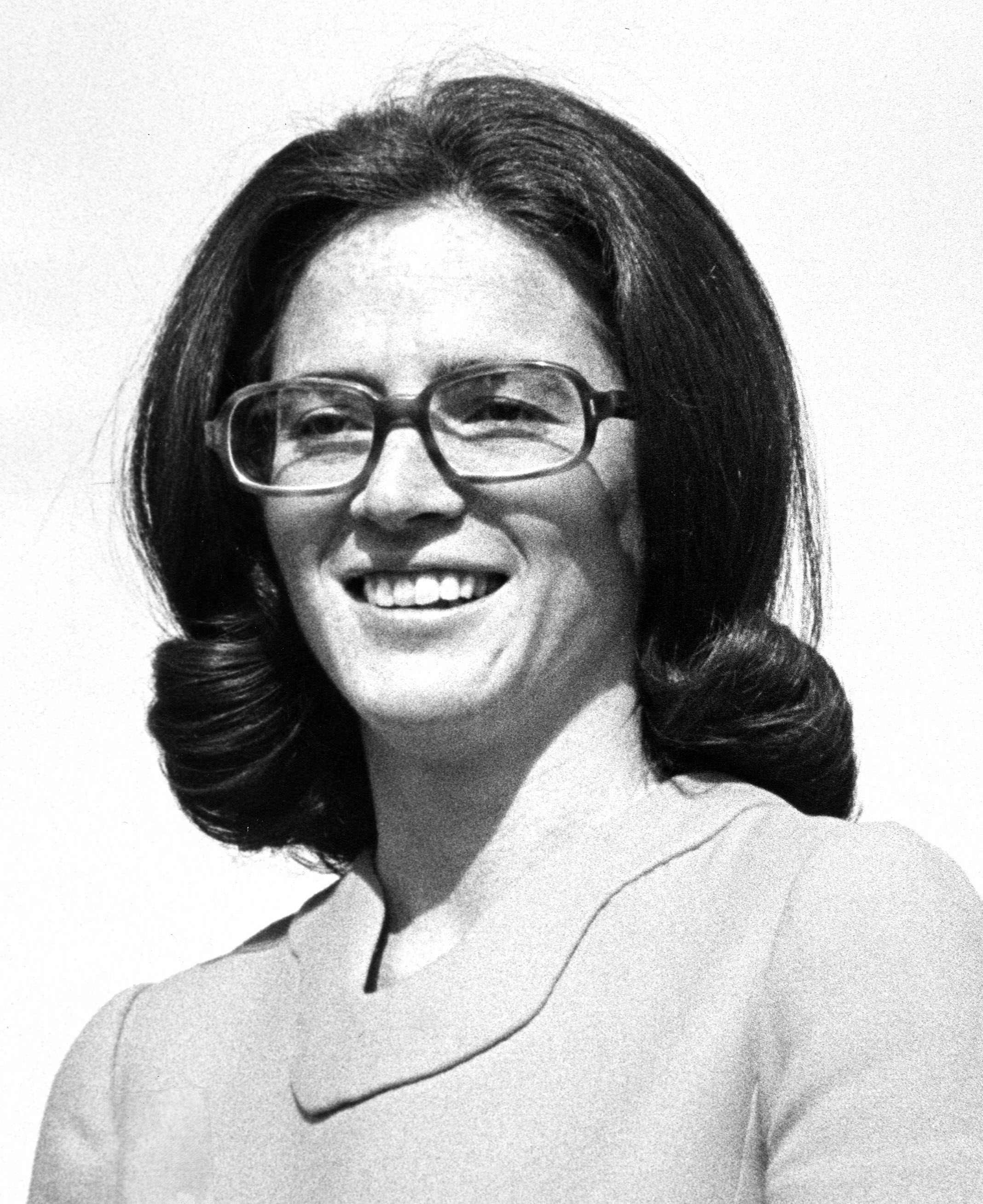

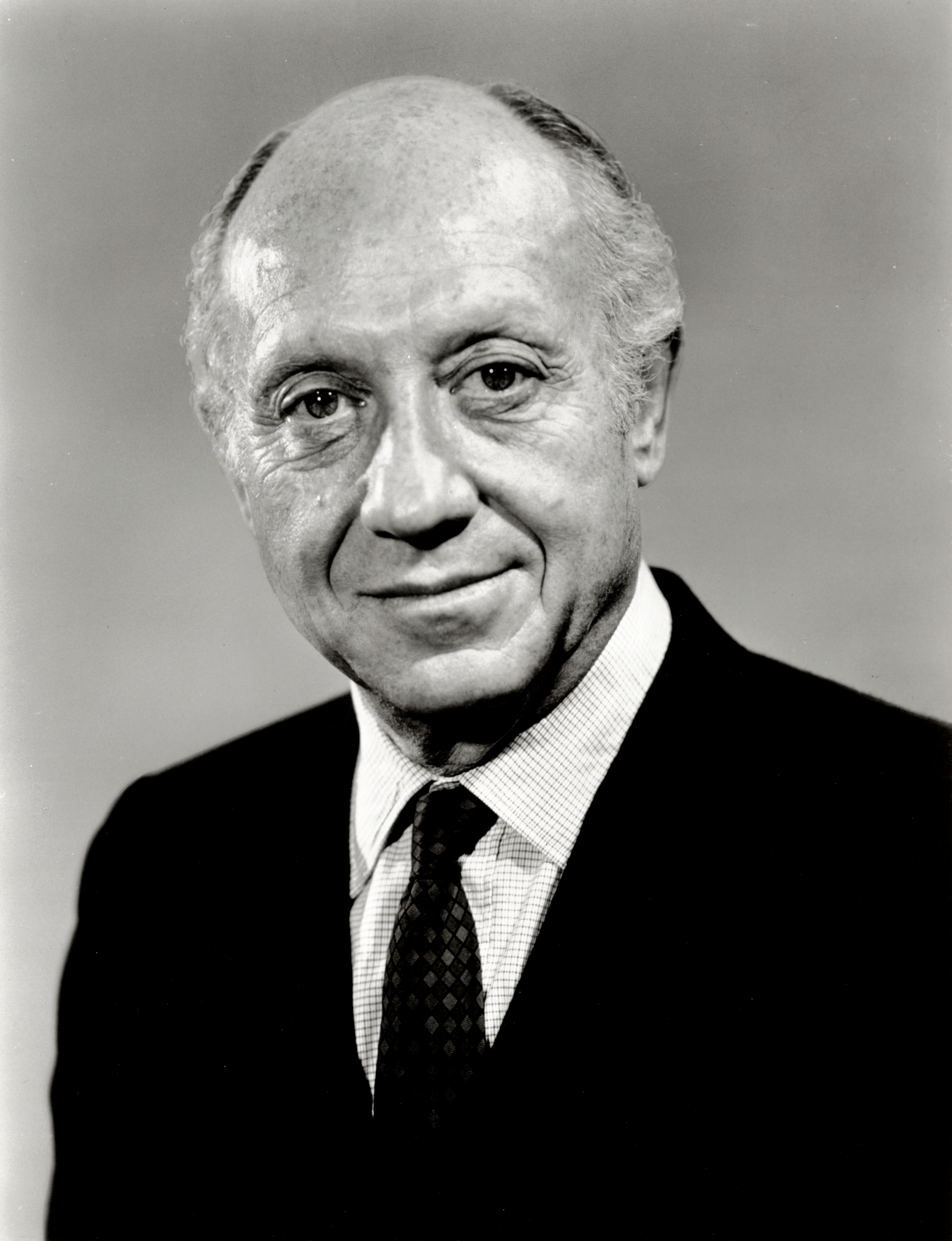
Nominee	Al D'Amato	Elizabeth Holtzman	Jacob Javits
Party	Republican	Democratic	Liberal
Alliance	Conservative; Right to Life
Popular vote	2,699,652	2,618,661	664,544
Percentage	44.88%	43.54%	11.05%
- County results D'Amato: 40–50% 50–60% 60–70% Holtzman: 40–50% 50–60% 60–70%
U.S. senator before election
Jacob Javits
Republican
Elected U.S. Senator
Al D'Amato
Republican

The 1980 United States Senate election in New York was held on November 4, 1980. Incumbent U.S. Senator Jacob Javits ran for re-election to a fifth term in office on the Liberal Party line, but he finished third behind Hempstead town supervisor Al D'Amato and U.S. representative Elizabeth Holtzman of Brooklyn.

Primary elections were held on September 9. In the Democratic primary, Elizabeth Holtzman defeated Bess Myerson with former New York City mayor John Lindsay finishing a distant third. Queens district attorney John J. Santucci finished fourth. Because D'Amato and Javits had each secured ballot access through minor party endorsements in June, the Republican primary was reduced to a preliminary test of strength; D'Amato defeated Javits with 55.7 percent of the vote.

In the general election, D'Amato defeated Holtzman narrowly, with Javits splitting the liberal vote. Despite the narrow plurality and the fact that the seat technically remained with the Republican Party, D'Amato's victory over the liberal Javits is often included in discussions of the Reagan Revolution in the 1980 elections, in which the Republican Party, led by conservative presidential nominee Ronald Reagan, gained control of the White House and U.S. Senate by picking up twelve seats. D'Amato would go on to serve three terms in the Senate before losing the 1998 election to Chuck Schumer, who succeeded Holtzman in the House following this election.

== Background ==
Incumbent senator Jacob Javits had been one of the most liberal members of the Republican Party since he first entered Congress in the 1940s. However, his electability and considerable influence had allowed him to maintain strength within the party, and he had won four terms in the Senate even as his views became less and less popular among Republican voters. By 1979, he was the longest-serving U.S. Senator in New York history.

For years, Javits had been considered politically invincible, but the rise of the Conservative Party of New York, whose endorsement represented at least ten percent of the general electorate, threatened his re-election prospects and figured significantly into political maneuvering ahead of the election. In Javits's prior two elections, 1968 and 1974, he had survived with a plurality of the vote against strong Conservative performances. In 1970, incumbent Senator Charles Goodell, running with support from both the Republican and Liberal parties, lost to Conservative James L. Buckley. Javits also faced criticism from liberals over his tepid opposition to the Vietnam War nearly a decade prior, including his failure to co-sponsor Goodell's amendment setting a deadline for American withdrawal. Javits had also been outflanked by Buckley in 1974, when the junior senator called for the resignation of President Richard Nixon while Javits demurred. Javits's political strain was compounded by his physical decline. In 1979, he was diagnosed with ALS which, in conjunction with his advanced age, drew opponents into the 1980 race amid widespread speculation that he would not run for a fifth term.

Prior to 1980, Javits had never faced a primary challenge. Early speculation focused on U.S. Representative Jack Kemp of Buffalo, whose proposal for a national tax cut had made him a political celebrity among conservatives. Although Kemp would have been assured of Conservative Party support, he declined to challenge Javits and said he would run only if Javits retired. Until such time, the Conservative Party withheld its endorsement in hopes that Kemp would declare his campaign. Some speculation also centered on former U.S. secretary of state Henry Kissinger, who was favored by moderates, as a candidate for the Republican nomination. Kissinger also declined to run.

By January 1980, only two challengers, Queens attorney James Eagan and Hempstead supervisor Al D'Amato, had announced campaigns for the Republican nomination. Eagan was a complete political unknown, but D'Amato had support from Long Island party leaders and had strong ties to the Conservative Party, making him a serious threat for the nomination and general election. However, U.S. representative Bruce Caputo announced on January 17 that he would enter the race, assuming Javits ran and Kemp did not. Both Caputo and D'Amato argued that a candidate with both Republican and Conservative support would be unbeatable in the general election, if Javits remained in the race on the Liberal ticket, which he was expected to do.

Javits initially said he would announce his intentions by February 12 but delayed that decision two weeks, citing his health. Javits also refused to fundraise before formally announcing his campaign despite changes in the law that would have allowed it. When he did finally announce his re-election bid on February 25, Javits shocked supporters by revealing his ALS diagnosis, though he had Jerome B. Posner of the Sloan-Kettering Institute confirm that the disease would not affect Javits's cognition and that Javits could serve out the six-year term. (Javits ultimately died in March 1986, roughly one year before his term would have ended.)

== Liberal nomination ==
=== Candidates ===
- Jacob Javits, incumbent U.S. senator since 1957 (also running as Republican)
- Elizabeth Holtzman, U.S. representative from Brooklyn (also running as Democrat)

=== Results ===
Although Elizabeth Holtzman made an effort to secure the Liberal Party endorsement, Javits won it for the fifth consecutive election at the party convention at the New York Hilton Hotel on June 14. Party chair Raymond Harding was outspoken in urging Javits to run and his nomination by the party was a foregone conclusion.

== Conservative nomination ==
=== Candidates ===
- Al D'Amato, Hempstead town supervisor (also running as Republican)
- Bruce Caputo, former U.S. representative from Yonkers and candidate for lieutenant governor in 1978 (also running as Republican)
- James Eagan, Queens attorney (also running as Republican)

==== Declined ====
- Jack Kemp, U.S. representative from Buffalo

=== Campaign ===
Javits's entry and Kemp's confirmation that he would not challenge the senator began the campaign in earnest between Caputo, D'Amato, and Javits. The campaign to reach the general election essentially became a two-stage contest: first, between Caputo and D'Amato would contend for the Conservative Party endorsement and second, Javits would face the Conservative candidate for the Republican nomination. Despite fears that he would split the anti-Javits vote, Caputo pledged he would remain in the race if he lost the Conservative nomination, disputing the assumption that the two would split the anti-Javits vote.

The Conservative Party nomination was determined by a vote of the party's central committee. There was considerable debate, up to the day of the vote, over whether the committee would weight their votes by geographic party support. D'Amato favored this measure, which had been used for past nominations, because it would emphasize his strength in the party's Long Island base.

Of the two contenders, Caputo had broader recognition from his statewide campaign for lieutenant governor in 1978 and his role in the House Ethics Committee investigation into Koreagate and was considered stronger against Javits. However, he faced an uphill battle for the Conservative nomination against D'Amato, who was considered the more conservative of the two and had a firm base of support on Long Island. D'Amato criticized Caputo's support for the Humphrey–Hawkins Full Employment Act and his opposition to the B-1 bomber.

On March 22, the state committee met to informally endorse a candidate. In preliminary speeches, D'Amato supporters stressed his long standing in the Conservative Party and his support from the Republican Party state committee, which would allow him to access the primary ballot without resorting to an expensive petition drive. Debate over whether to weight votes geographically resolved in favor of D'Amato.

The final weighted vote backed D'Amato over Caputo nearly two-to-one.

1980 Conservative Party committee vote
Party	Candidate	Votes	%
Conservative	Al D'Amato	155,877	65.63%
Conservative	Bruce Caputo	80,587	33.93%
Conservative	James Eagan	1,048	0.44%
Total votes		237,512	100.00%

After the announcement, Caputo said he would remain in the race, and D'Amato pledged to contest the general election as the Conservative nominee, even if he lost the Republican primary.

At the party convention at the Starlight Banquet House in Auburn on June 14, D'Amato was officially endorsed as the party's candidate for the general election. He also secured the endorsement of the Right to Life Party on the same day at the Buffalo Convention Center.

== Republican primary ==
=== Candidates ===
- Al D'Amato, Hempstead town supervisor (also running as Conservative)
- Jacob Javits, incumbent U.S. senator since 1957 (also running as Liberal)

==== Withdrew ====
- Bruce Caputo, former U.S. representative from Yonkers and candidate for lieutenant governor in 1978
- James Eagan, Queens attorney

==== Declined ====
- Jack Kemp, U.S. representative from Buffalo
- Henry Kissinger, former U.S. Secretary of State

=== Campaign ===
Following the June 14 endorsements of Javits and D'Amato by the Liberal and Conservative parties respectively and the withdrawal of Bruce Caputo, which guaranteed both remaining candidates would be on the general election ballot, the Republican primary was reduced in significance to a preliminary test of strength, with both candidates guaranteed to continue on to the November general election along with the winner of the Democratic primary.

Few initially believed that D'Amato would defeat Javits in the primary.

=== Results ===
Results by county D'Amato: 50–60% 60–70% 70–80% Javits: 50–60% 60–70% 70–80% Tie:

Republican primary results
Party	Candidate	Votes	%
Republican	Al D'Amato	323,468	55.68%
Republican	Jacob Javits (incumbent)	257,433	44.32%
Total votes		580,901	100.00%

== Democratic primary ==
=== Candidates ===
- Elizabeth Holtzman, U.S. representative from Brooklyn
- John Lindsay, former mayor of New York City and U.S. representative from the Upper East Side
- Bess Myerson, former commissioner of the New York City Department of Consumer Affairs and Miss America 1945
- John J. Santucci, Queens District Attorney

==== Declined ====
- Joseph A. Califano, former U.S. Secretary of Health, Education, and Welfare

=== Campaign ===
The Democratic field included four major candidates. Former Miss America Bess Myerson was the early favorite. She had the support of junior senator Daniel Patrick Moynihan, New York City mayor Ed Koch, and Governor Hugh Carey, as well as celebrity status as a beauty pageant queen, television personality, and icon within the Jewish community of New York. If she faltered, however, most expected Elizabeth Holtzman to take the lead. Holtzman had unseated Emanuel Celler in 1972 and had a national profile from her leading role in the Nixon impeachment hearings. The third leading candidate, former New York City mayor John Lindsay, was considered popular with minority voters but struggled to distance himself from his controversial tenure as mayor, which some New Yorkers blamed for the city's 1975 fiscal crisis.

Holtzman rose quickly, despite her difficulty expressing criticism of Senator Javits, who remained popular with the liberal Democrats who supported her campaign. During the campaign, Holtzman boasted that she had "never been hand-picked by the bosses [or] by anyone", in a thinly veiled dig at her opponents. Holtzman also touted her legislative record, implicitly criticizing Myerson's lack of actual political experience, and her support for women's rights, having secured an extension for the Equal Rights Amendment's 1979 ratification. Myerson also struggled to define herself ideologically, and by late March 1980, Holtzman had already pulled ahead in at least one poll.

In August, Lindsay claimed that Governor Carey had privately told him that he regretted endorsing Myerson. Carey publicly denied this, but his comment in the same interview that he viewed this senate seat as "a Jewish seat" led to criticism from the Anti-Defamation League and all four candidates.

=== Endorsements ===
Elizabeth Holtzman

Statewide officials

- Robert Abrams, 60th Attorney General of New York (1979–1993)

State legislature

- Carol Berman, member of the New York State Senate from the 9th district (1979–1984)
- Jerry Kremer, member of the New York State Assembly from the 20th district (1966–1988)
Bess Myerson

Statewide officials

- Hugh Carey, 51st Governor of New York (1975–1982)

Local officials

- Ed Koch, 105th Mayor of New York City (1978–1989)

=== Results ===
New York Senate Democratic primary election, 1980
Party	Candidate	Votes	%
Democratic	Elizabeth Holtzman	378,567	40.74%
Democratic	Bess Myerson	292,767	31.51%
Democratic	John Lindsay	146,815	15.80%
Democratic	John J. Santucci	111,129	11.96%
Total votes		929,278	100.00%

== General election ==
=== Candidates ===
- Al D'Amato, Hempstead town supervisor (Conservative, Republican and Right to Life)
- Elizabeth Holtzman, U.S. representative from Brooklyn (Democratic)
- Jacob Javits, incumbent U.S. senator since 1957 (Liberal)
- Victor Nieto (Socialist Workers)
- Richard Savadel (Libertarian)
- William R. Scott (Communist)
- Thomas Soto (Workers World)

=== Campaign ===
Javits' campaign did well financially after his defeat in the Republican primary and his contributions exceeded D'Amato. He raised $289,062 between August 21 and September 30, while D'Amato raised $217,969 and Holtzman raised $294,708 in that same period. Gerald Ford and Arthur Goldberg wrote to possible donors on Javits' behalf and U.S. Senator Charles H. Percy hosted a fundraiser for Javits. By this point Javits' campaign spent $697,625, D'Amato spent $867,535, and Holtzman spent $1.3 million.

On October 22, the three candidates participated in a debate hosted by the Buffalo Courier-Express.

Late in the race, a great deal of speculation centered on whether Javits would drop out to ensure Holtzman's victory. At an October 13 press conference, Javits stated he might consider dropping out, but declared the next day that he was "in this race to stay". After the press conference, New York City union organizers Sol Chaikin and Victor Gotbaum attempted to convince Javits to drop out to prevent him from splitting the vote with Holtzman and allowing D'Amato to win. The New York Times and Constance E. Cook, who had co-chaired Javits' campaign, also called on him to drop out. On October 31, the Daily News reported that Javits would have dropped out if Holtzman had asked him, but he denied it the next day.

=== Endorsements ===
Elizabeth Holtzman

U.S. Congress

- Tip O'Neill, member of the United States House of Representatives from Massachusetts (1953–1987) and 47th Speaker of the United States House of Representatives (1977–1987)

State legislators

- Constance E. Cook, member of the New York State Assembly from the 128th district (1963–1974)

Local officials

- Ed Koch, 105th Mayor of New York City (1978–1989)

Organizations

- New York State Teachers Association

Newspapers

- The Ithaca Journal
Jacob Javits

U.S. Congress

- Bill Green, member of the United States House of Representatives (1978–1993)

=== Polling ===
Poll source	Date(s) administered	Sample size	Margin of error	Al D'Amato Republican	Elizabeth Holtzman Democratic	Jacob Javits Liberal	Other / Undecided
New York Daily News; Richard F. Link and Associates	October 1980	2,479 (RV)		34%	29%	23%	14%

=== Results ===
General election results
Party	Candidate	Votes	%	±%
Republican	Al D'Amato	2,272,082	37.77%	▼2.87
Conservative	Al D'Amato	275,100	4.57%	▼11.36
Right to Life	Al D'Amato	152,470	2.53%	N/A
Total	Al D'Amato	2,699,652	44.88%	N/A
Democratic	Elizabeth Holtzman	2,618,661	43.54%	▲5.31
Liberal	Jacob Javits (incumbent)	664,544	11.05%	▲6.37
Libertarian	Richard Savadel	21,465	0.36%	N/A
Communist	William R. Scott	4,161	0.07%	▼0.01
Workers World	Thomas Soto	3,643	0.06%	
Socialist Workers	Victor A. Nieto	2,715	0.05%	▼0.10
Write-in		73	0.00%	
Majority		80,991	1.34%	
Total votes		6,014,914	100.00%	
Republican hold		Swing		

== See also ==
- 1980 United States Senate elections
