= Geraldine Ferraro =

American politician and attorney (1935–2011)

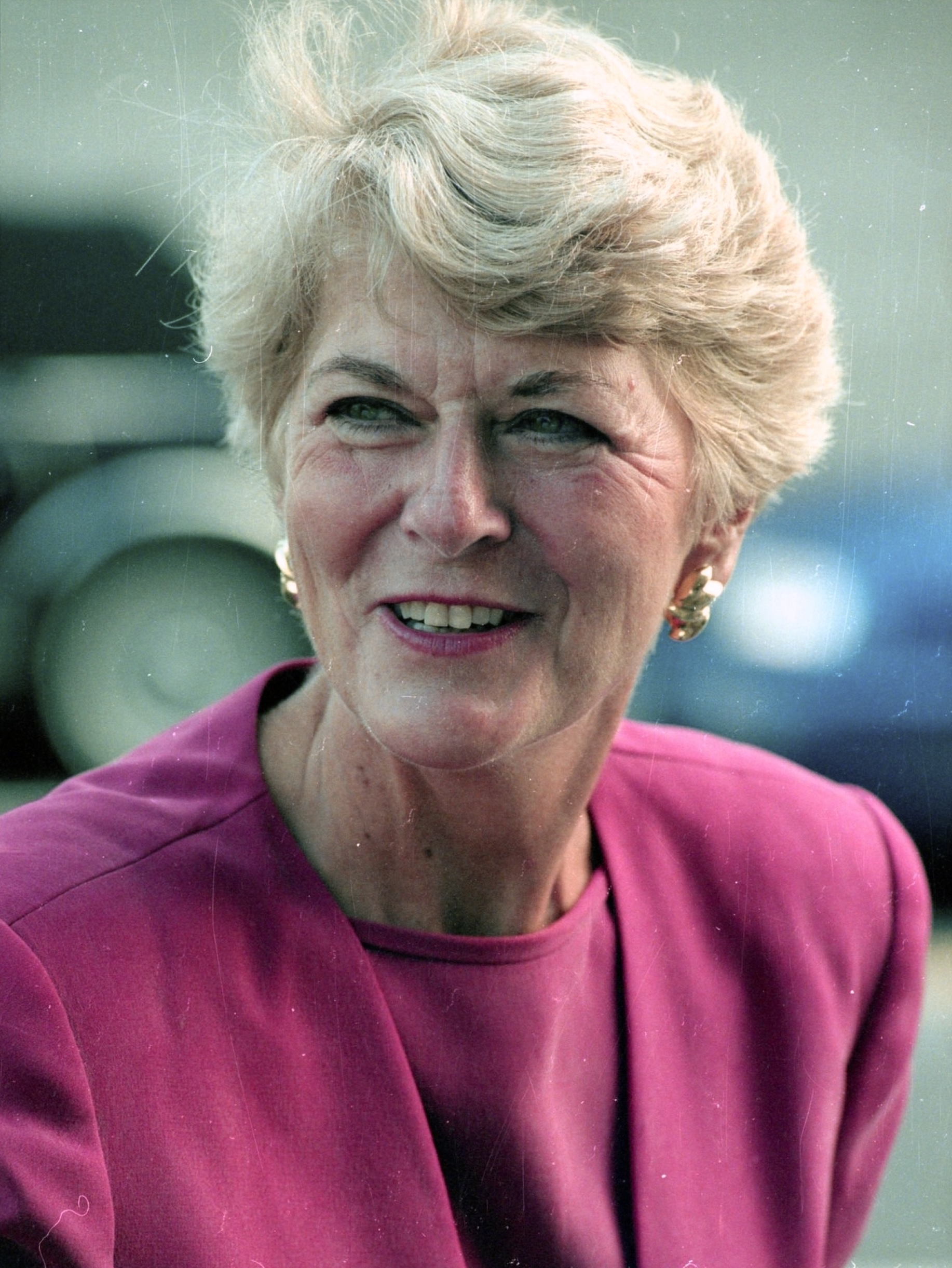
- Ferraro in 1998

United States Ambassador to the United Nations Commission on Human Rights
- In office March 4, 1993 – October 11, 1996
- President: Bill Clinton
- Preceded by: Armando Valladares
- Succeeded by: Nancy Rubin

Secretary of the House Democratic Caucus
- In office January 3, 1981 – January 3, 1985
- Leader: Tip O'Neill
- Preceded by: Shirley Chisholm
- Succeeded by: Mary Oakar

Member of the U.S. House of Representatives from New York's 9th district
- In office January 3, 1979 – January 3, 1985
- Preceded by: James Delaney
- Succeeded by: Thomas Manton

Personal details
- Born: Geraldine Anne Ferraro; August 26, 1935 Newburgh, New York, U.S.
- Died: March 26, 2011 (aged 75) Boston, Massachusetts, U.S.
- Resting place: St. John Cemetery
- Party: Democratic
- Spouse: John Zaccaro (m. 1960)
- Children: 3
- Education: Marymount Manhattan College (BA); Fordham University (JD)

Geraldine Anne Ferraro (August 26, 1935 – March 26, 2011) was an American politician, attorney, and diplomat who served as a member of the United States House of Representatives from 1979 to 1985, representing New York's 9th congressional district. A member of the Democratic Party, she was the party's vice presidential nominee in the 1984 presidential election, running alongside presidential nominee and former Vice President Walter Mondale; this made her the first female vice-presidential nominee representing a major American political party. (Note: Although Ferraro was the first woman to be on a major-party ticket for one of the nation's two highest offices, she was not the first woman to receive an electoral college vote. That woman was Theodora Nathan, a Libertarian vice-presidential candidate who got the support of Roger MacBride, a faithless elector from Virginia who, in 1972, voted for her instead of the pledged Spiro Agnew. However, Ferraro was the first woman to receive more than one electoral vote. See "Women Presidential and Vice Presidential Candidates: A Selected List" (PDF). Rutgers University Center for American Women and Politics. 2008. Archived from the original (PDF) on March 20, 2009.) Ferraro was also a journalist, author, and businesswoman.

Born in Newburgh, New York, Ferraro grew up in New York City. After attending Marymount Manhattan College, and earning a Juris Doctor from the Fordham University, she worked as a public school teacher before training as a lawyer. Ferraro joined the Queens County District Attorney's Office in 1974, heading the new Special Victims Bureau that dealt with sex crimes, child abuse, and domestic violence. In 1978, she was elected to the House of Representatives, and held this seat until 1985. During her tenure in the House, Ferraro rose rapidly in the Democratic Party hierarchy while focusing on legislation to bring equity for women in the areas of wages, pensions, and retirement plans.

In 1984, former Vice President and presidential nominee Mondale, seen as an underdog, selected Ferraro as his running mate for the upcoming presidential election. In doing so, Ferraro also became the first widely recognized Italian American to be a major-party national nominee. (Note: Mention is occasionally made of Al Smith, who was the Democratic presidential nominee in the 1928 election, as the first Italian American to run on a major party national ticket. But Smith was only one-quarter Italian in heritage, was not known by an Italian surname, and was generally identified as an Irish American. While his Roman Catholic religion was certainly a major issue in the election, his partial Italian heritage was not. See Slayton, Robert A. (December 10, 2011). "When a Catholic Terrified the Heartland". The New York Times. The large majority of sources consider Ferraro to have been the first Italian American to achieve this distinction. See Martin, Douglas (March 26, 2011). "She Ended the Men's Club of National Politics". The New York Times.; Schudel, Matt (March 26, 2011). "Geraldine A. Ferraro, first woman major-party candidate on presidential ticket, dies at 75". The Washington Post.; Woo, Elaine (March 26, 2011). "Geraldine Ferraro dies at 75; shattered political barrier for women as vice presidential nominee in 1984". Los Angeles Times.; and McGuire, Bill (March 27, 2011). "Geraldine Ferraro, First Woman VP Candidate, Dies at 75". ABC News.) The positive polling the Mondale–Ferraro ticket received when she joined soon faded, as damaging questions arose about her and her businessman husband John Zaccaro's finances and wealth and her congressional disclosure statements. In the general election, Mondale and Ferraro were defeated in a landslide by Republican President Ronald Reagan and Vice President George H. W. Bush.

After the 1984 election, Ferraro ran campaigns for a seat in the United States Senate from New York in 1992 and in 1998, both times starting as the front-runner for her party's nomination before losing in the primary election. During that time, she served as the Ambassador to the United Nations Commission on Human Rights from 1993 to 1996 under President Bill Clinton. She also continued her career as a journalist, author, and businesswoman, and served in the presidential campaign of Senator Hillary Clinton for the 2008 presidential election. Ferraro died at the age of 75 in March 2011 from multiple myeloma, 12 years after being diagnosed.

== Early life and education ==
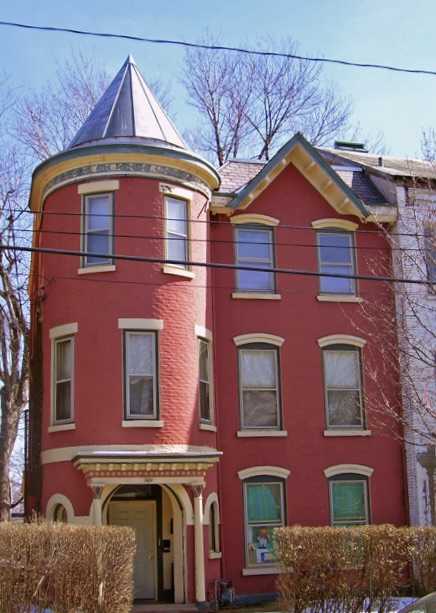
Ferraro's childhood home in Newburgh, New York. She also lived in the home until age ten.

Geraldine Anne Ferraro was born on August 26, 1935, in Newburgh, New York, to Antonetta L. Ferraro (née Corrieri), a first-generation Italian American seamstress, and Dominick Ferraro, an Italian immigrant from Marcianise, Campania, and owner of two restaurants. She had three brothers born before her, but one died in infancy and another at age three. Ferraro attended the parochial school Mount Saint Mary's in Newburgh when she was young. Her father died of a heart attack in May 1944, when she was eight. Ferraro's mother soon invested and lost the remainder of the family's money, forcing the family to move to a low-income area in the South Bronx while Ferraro's mother worked in the garment industry to support them.

Ferraro stayed on at Mount Saint Mary's as a boarder for a while, then briefly attended a parochial school in the South Bronx. Beginning in 1947, she attended and lived at the parochial Marymount Academy in Tarrytown, New York, using income from a family rental property in Italy and skipping seventh grade. At Marymount Ferraro was a member of the honor society, active in several clubs and sports, voted most likely to succeed, and graduated in 1952. Her mother was adamant that she get a full education, despite an uncle in the family saying, "Why bother? She's pretty. She's a girl. She'll get married." Ferraro attended Marymount Manhattan College with a scholarship while sometimes holding two or three jobs at the same time. During her senior year she began dating John Zaccaro of Forest Hills, Queens, who had graduated from Iona College with a commission in the U.S. Marine Corps. Ferraro received a Bachelor of Arts in English in 1956; she was the first woman in her family to gain a college degree. She also passed the city exam to become a licensed school teacher.

Ferraro began working as an elementary school teacher in public schools in the Astoria section of New York City, "because that's what women were supposed to do." Unsatisfied, she decided to attend law school; an admissions officer said to her, "I hope you're serious, Gerry. You're taking a man's place, you know." She earned a Juris Doctor degree with honors from Fordham University School of Law in 1960, going to classes at night while continuing to work as a second-grade teacher at schools such as P.S. 57 during the day. Ferraro was one of only two women in her graduating class of 179. She was admitted to the bar of New York State in March 1961.

== Family and early legal career ==
Ferraro became engaged to Zaccaro in August 1959 and married him on July 16, 1960. He became a realtor and businessman. She kept her birth name professionally, as a way to honor her mother for having supported the family after her father's death, but used his name in parts of her private life. The couple had three children, Donna (born 1962), John Jr. (born 1964), and Laura (born 1966). They lived in Forest Hills Gardens, Queens, and in 1971, added a vacation house in Saltaire on Fire Island. They would buy a condominium in Saint Croix in the U.S. Virgin Islands in 1983.

While raising the children, Ferraro worked part-time as a civil lawyer in her husband's real estate firm for 13 years. She also occasionally worked for other clients and did some pro bono work for women in family court. She spent time at local Democratic clubs, which allowed her to maintain contacts within the legal profession and become involved in local politics and campaigns. While organizing community opposition to a proposed building, Ferraro met lawyer and Democratic figure Mario Cuomo, who became a political mentor. In 1970, she was elected president of the Queens County Women's Bar Association.

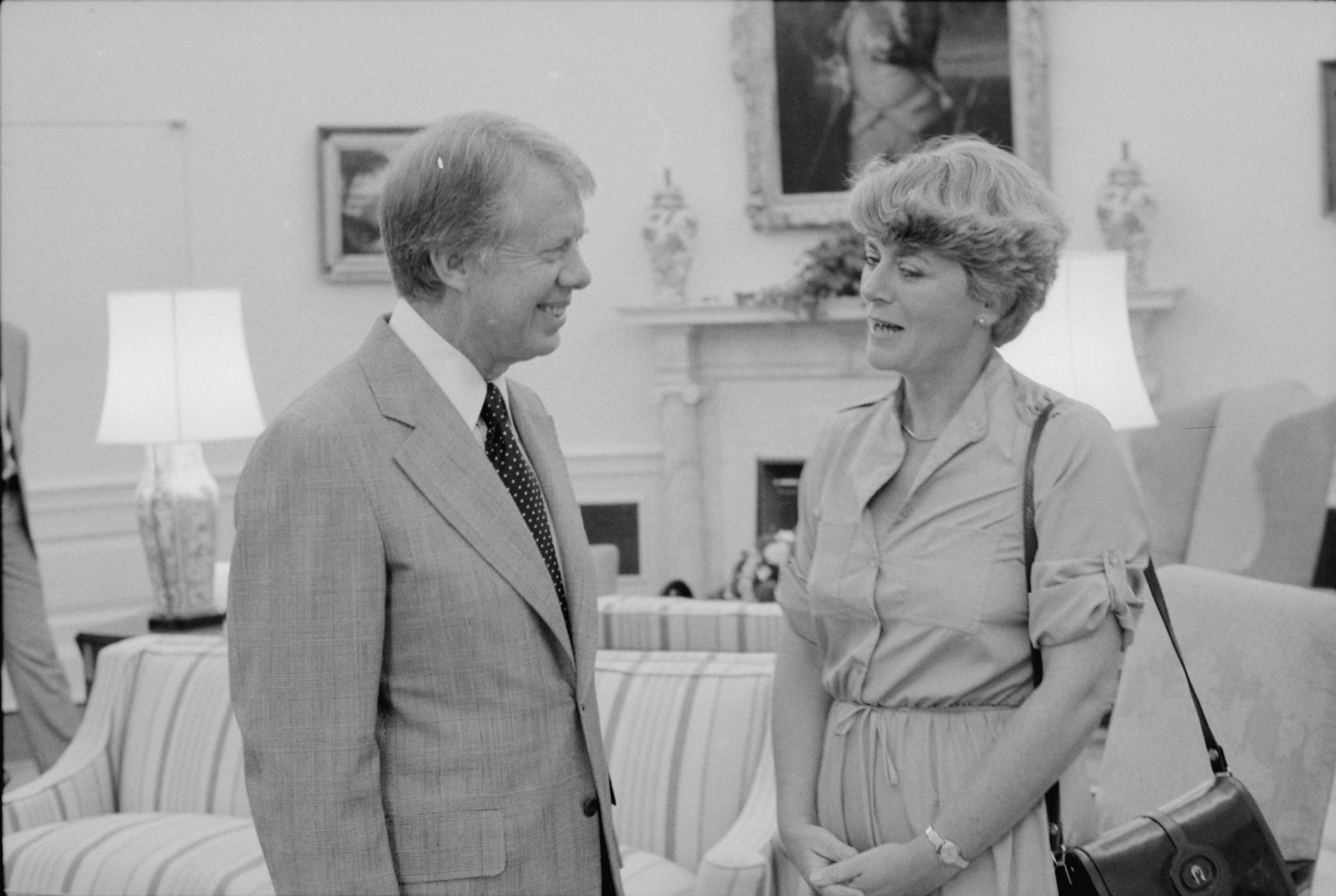
Ferraro meeting with President Jimmy Carter at the White House in 1978

Ferraro's first full-time political job came in January 1974, when she was appointed Assistant District Attorney for Queens County, New York, by her cousin, District Attorney Nicholas Ferraro. At the time, women prosecutors in the city were uncommon. Grumblings that she was the beneficiary of nepotism were countered by her being rated as qualified by a screening committee and by her early job performance in the Investigations Bureau. The following year, Ferraro was assigned to the new Special Victims Bureau, which prosecuted cases involving rape, child abuse, spouse abuse, and domestic violence. She was named head of the unit in 1977, with two other assistant district attorneys assigned to her. In this role, she became a strong advocate for abused children. She was admitted to the U.S. Supreme Court Bar in 1978.

As part of the D.A. office, Ferraro worked long hours, and gained a reputation for being a tough prosecutor but fair in plea negotiations. Although her unit was supposed to turn over cases which were bound for trial to another division, she took an active role in trying some cases herself, and juries were persuaded by her summations. Ferraro was upset to discover that her superior was paying her less than equivalent male colleagues because she was a married woman and already had a husband. Moreover, Ferraro found the nature of the cases she dealt with debilitating; the work left her "drained and angry" and she developed an ulcer. She grew frustrated that she was unable to deal with root causes, and talked about running for legislative office; Cuomo, now Secretary of State of New York, suggested the United States Congress.

== U.S. House of Representatives (1979–1985) ==
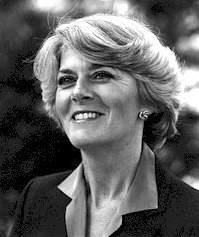
Ferraro as a member of the U.S. House of Representatives

Ferraro ran for election to the U.S. House of Representatives from New York's 9th Congressional District in Queens in 1978, after longtime Democratic incumbent James Delaney announced his retirement. The location for the television series All in the Family, the district, which stretched from Astoria to Ozone Park, was known for its ethnic composition and conservative views. In a three-candidate primary race for the Democratic nomination, Ferraro faced two better-known rivals, the party organization candidate, City Councilman Thomas J. Manton and Patrick Deignan. Her main issues were law and order, support for the elderly, and neighborhood preservation. She labeled herself a "'small c' conservative" and emphasized that she was not a bleeding-heart liberal; her campaign slogan was "Finally, A Tough Democrat". Her Italian heritage also appealed to ethnic residents in the district. She won the three-way primary with 53 percent of the vote, and then captured the general election as well, defeating Republican Alfred A. DelliBovi by a 10-percentage-point margin in a contest in which dealing with crime was the major issue and personal attacks by DelliBovi were frequent. She had been aided by $130,000 in campaign loans and donations from her own family, including $110,000 in loans from Zaccaro, of which only $4,000 was legal. The source and nature of these transactions were declared illegal by the Federal Election Commission shortly before the primary, causing Ferraro to pay back the loans in October 1978, via several real estate transactions. In 1979, the campaign and Zaccaro paid $750 in fines for civil violations of election law.

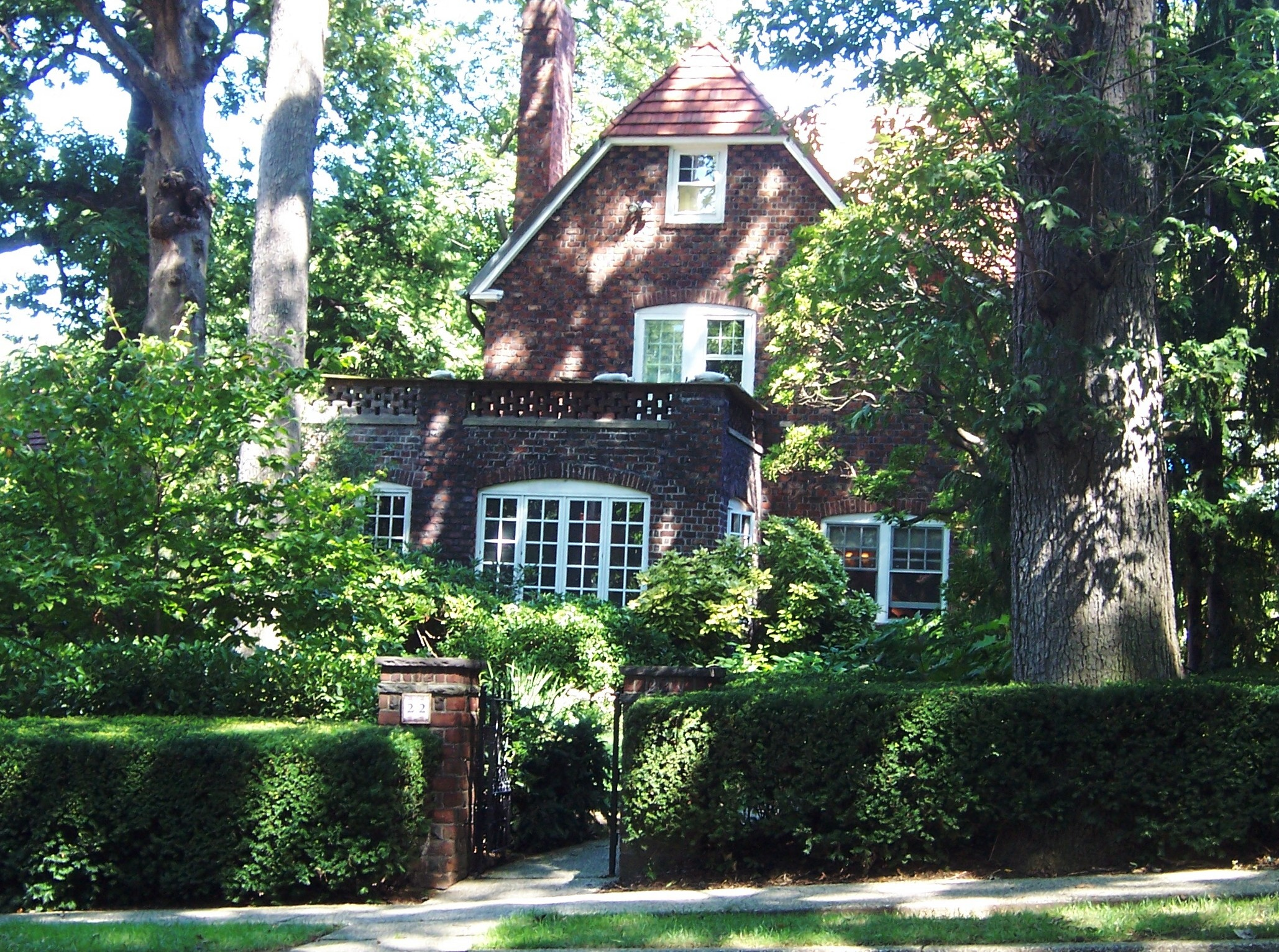
Ferraro and her family lived in the house pictured in Forest Hills Gardens, Queens, during her time in the House of Representatives, her vice-presidential campaign, and until the early 2000s.

Despite being a newcomer to the House, Ferraro made a vivid impression upon arrival and quickly found prominence. She became a protégé of House Speaker Tip O'Neill, established a rapport with other House Democratic leaders, and rose rapidly in the party hierarchy. She was elected Secretary of the House Democratic Caucus for 1981–1983 and again for 1983–1985; this entitled her to a seat on the influential Steering and Policy Committee. In 1983, she was named to the powerful House Budget Committee. She also served on the Public Works and Transportation Committee and the Post Office and Civil Service Committee, both of which allowed Ferraro to push through projects to benefit her district. In particular, she assisted the successful effort of the Ridgewood and Glendale neighborhoods to get their ZIP codes changed from Brooklyn to their native Queens. Male colleagues viewed her with respect as someone who was tough and ambitious and in turn she was, as The New York Times later wrote, "comfortable with the boys".

Ferraro was active in Democratic presidential politics as well. She served as one of the deputy chairs for the 1980 Carter-Mondale campaign. Following the election, she served actively on the Hunt Commission that in 1982, rewrote the Democratic delegate selection rules; Ferraro was credited as having been the prime agent behind the creation of superdelegates. By 1983, she was regarded as one of the up-and-coming stars of the party. She was the Chairwoman of the Platform Committee for the 1984 Democratic National Convention, the first woman to hold that position. There she held multiple hearings around the country and further gained in visibility.

While in Congress, Ferraro focused much of her legislative attention on equity for women in the areas of wages, pensions, and retirement plans. She was a cosponsor of the 1981 Economic Equity Act. On the House Select Committee on Aging, she concentrated on the problems of elderly women. In 1984, she championed a pension equity law revision that would improve the benefits of people who left work for long periods and then returned, a typical case for women with families. The Reagan administration, at first lukewarm to the measure, decided to sign it to gain the benefits of its popular appeal.

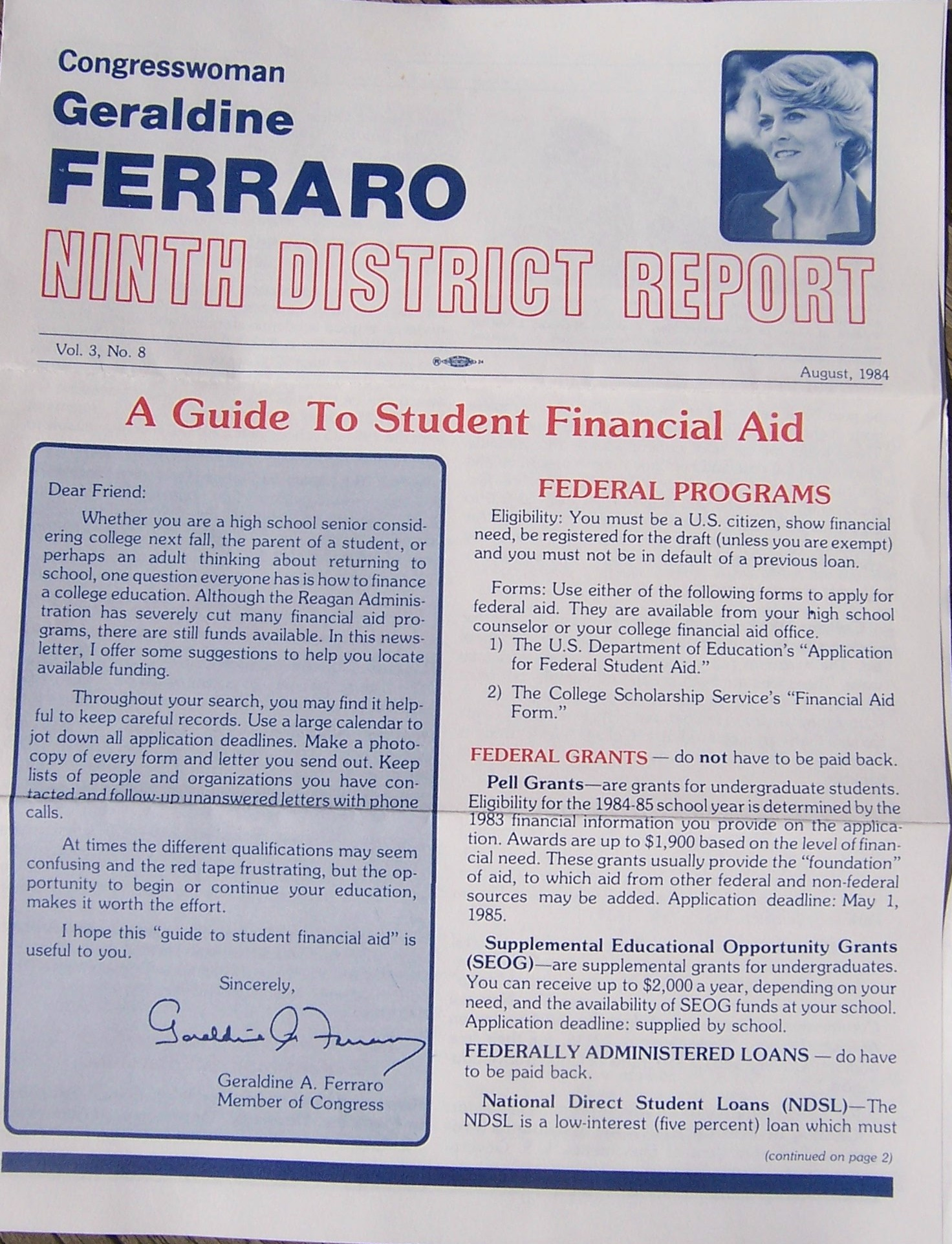
As with many representatives, Ferraro issued regular newsletters to her constituents.

Ferraro also worked on some environmental issues. During 1980, she tried to prevent the federal government from gaining the power to override local laws on hazardous materials transportation, an effort she continued in subsequent years. In August 1984, she led passage of a Superfund renewal bill and attacked the Reagan administration's handling of environmental site cleanups.

Ferraro took a congressional trip to Nicaragua at the start of 1984, where she spoke to the Contras. She decided that the Reagan administration's military interventions there and in El Salvador were counterproductive towards reaching U.S. security goals, and that regional negotiations would be better.

In all, Ferraro served three two-year terms, being re-elected in 1980 and 1982. Her vote shares increased to 58 percent and then 73 percent and much of her funding came from political action committees. While Ferraro's pro-choice views conflicted with those of many of her constituents as well as the Catholic Church to which she belonged, her positions on other social and foreign policy issues were in alignment with the district. She broke with her party in favoring an anti-busing amendment to the Constitution. She supported deployment of the Pershing II missile and the Trident submarine, although she opposed funding for the MX missile, the B-1B bomber, and the Strategic Defense Initiative.

While in the House, Ferraro's political self-description evolved to "moderate". In 1982, she said her experiences as assistant district attorney had changed some of her views: "... because no matter how concerned I am about spending, I have seen first hand what poverty can do to people's lives and I just can't, in good conscience, not do something about it." For her six years in Congress, Ferraro had an average 78-percent "Liberal Quotient" from Americans for Democratic Action (Note: See "Voting Records". Americans for Democratic Action. From 1979 through 1984, her scores were 74, 72, 85, 75, 90, and 70 (the decline in the last year was partly due to missed votes while campaigning for vice president).) and an average 8-percent rating from the American Conservative Union. (Note: See "Ratings of Congress". American Conservative Union. Archived from the original on June 19, 2010. From 1979 through 1984, her scores were 16, 17, 7, 10, 0, and 0.) The AFL–CIO's Committee on Political Education gave her an average approval rating of 91 percent.

== 1984 vice presidential campaign ==
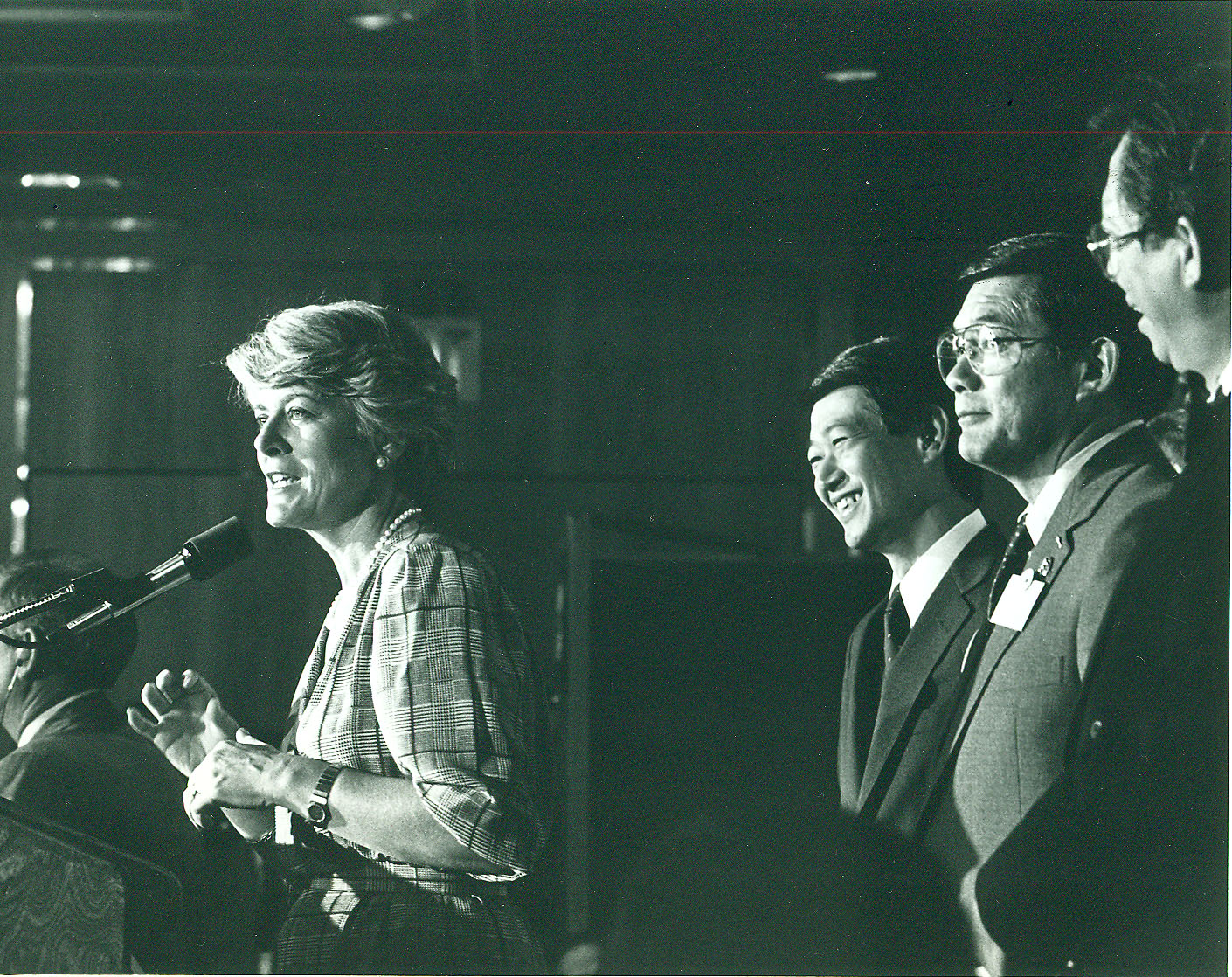
Ferraro speaking at the 1984 Democratic National Convention. Standing behind her are California Congressmen Bob Matsui and Norman Mineta and future San Francisco supervisor Tom Hsieh.

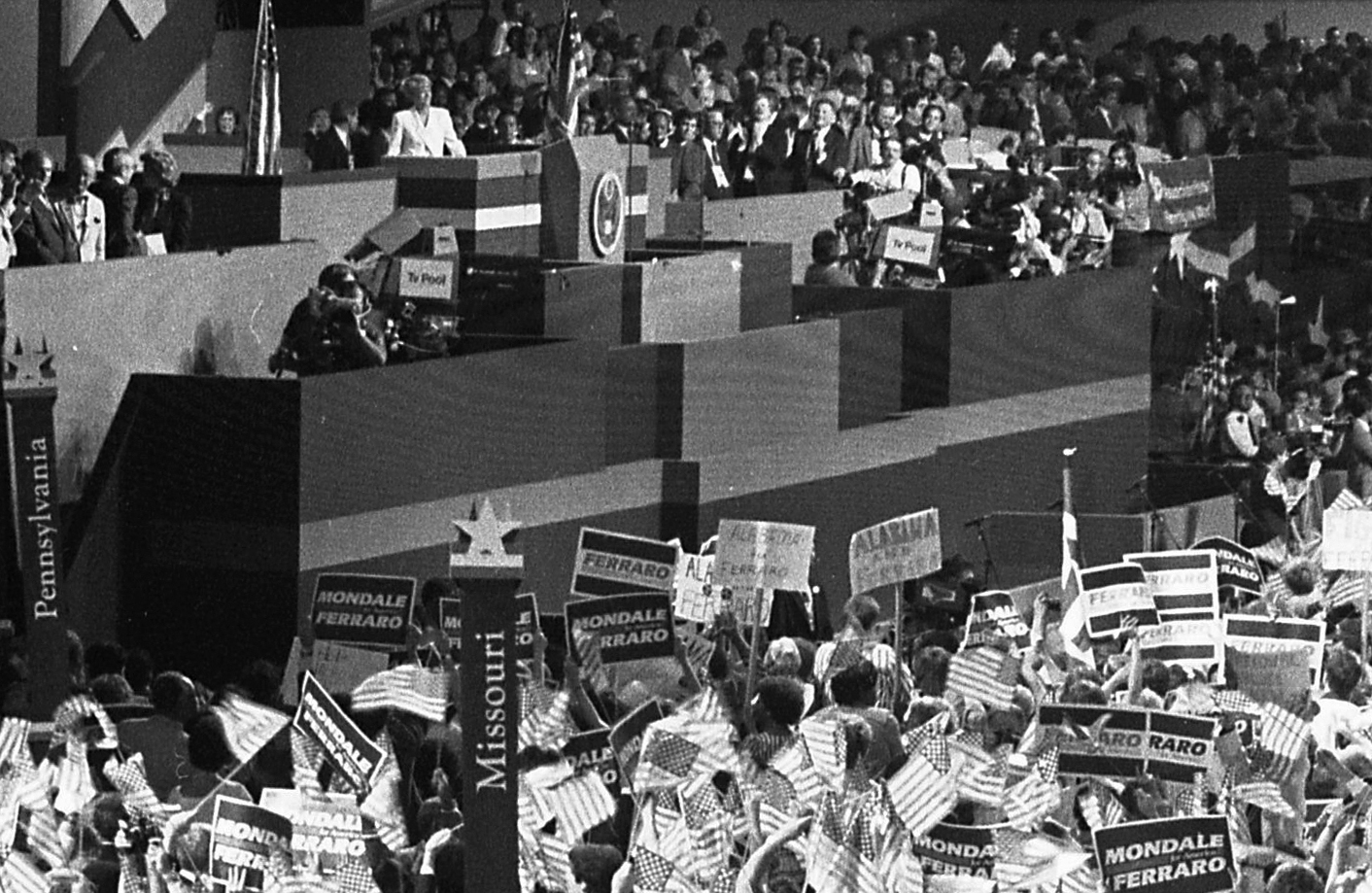
Ferraro delivering her vice presidential nomination acceptance speech at the 1984 Democratic National Convention

As the 1984 U.S. presidential election primary season neared its end and Walter Mondale became the likely Democratic nominee, the idea of picking a woman as his vice-presidential running mate gained considerable momentum. The National Organization for Women and the National Women's Political Caucus pushed the notion, as did several top Democratic figures such as Speaker Tip O'Neill. Women mentioned for the role included Ferraro and Mayor of San Francisco Dianne Feinstein, both of whom were on Mondale's five-person short list.

Mondale selected Ferraro to be his vice-presidential candidate on July 12, 1984. She stated, "I am absolutely thrilled." The Mondale campaign intended to attract women and ethnic Democrats in the Northeast U.S. who had abandoned their party for Reagan in 1980. Her personality, variously described as blunt, feisty, spirited, and somewhat saucy, was also viewed as an asset. In turn, Mondale accepted the risk that came with her inexperience.

As Ferraro was the first woman to run on a major party national ticket in the United States, and the first Italian American, her July 19 nomination at the 1984 Democratic National Convention was one of the most emotional moments of that gathering, with female delegates appearing joyous and proud at the historic occasion. In her acceptance speech, Ferraro said, "The daughter of an immigrant from Italy has been chosen to run for vice president in the new land my father came to love." Convention attendees were in tears during the speech, for not just its significance for women but all those who had immigrated to America.

A flyer advertised a post-convention Queens Borough Hall rally, for Ferraro to introduce Mondale to New York City voters.

Ferraro gained immediate, large-scale media attention. At first, journalists focused on her novelty as a woman and her poor family background, and their coverage was overwhelmingly favorable. Nevertheless, Ferraro faced many press questions about her foreign policy inexperience, and responded by discussing her attention to foreign and national security issues in Congress. She faced a threshold of proving competence that other high-level female political figures have had to face, especially those who might become commander-in-chief; the question "Are you tough enough?" was often directed to her. Ted Koppel questioned her closely about nuclear strategy and during Meet the Press she was asked, "Do you think that in any way the Soviets might be tempted to try to take advantage of you simply because you are a woman?"

The choice of Ferraro was viewed as a gamble, and pundits were uncertain whether it would result in a net gain or loss of votes for the Mondale campaign. While her choice was popular among Democratic activists, polls immediately after the announcement showed that only 22 percent of women were excited about Ferraro's selection, versus 18 percent who agreed that it was a "bad idea". By a three-to-one margin, voters thought that pressure from women's groups had led to Mondale's decision rather than his having chosen the best available candidate. Nonetheless, in the days after the convention Ferraro proved an effective campaigner, with a brash and confident style that forcefully criticized the Reagan administration and sometimes almost overshadowed Mondale. Mondale had been 16 points behind Reagan in polls before the pick, and after the convention he pulled even for a short time.

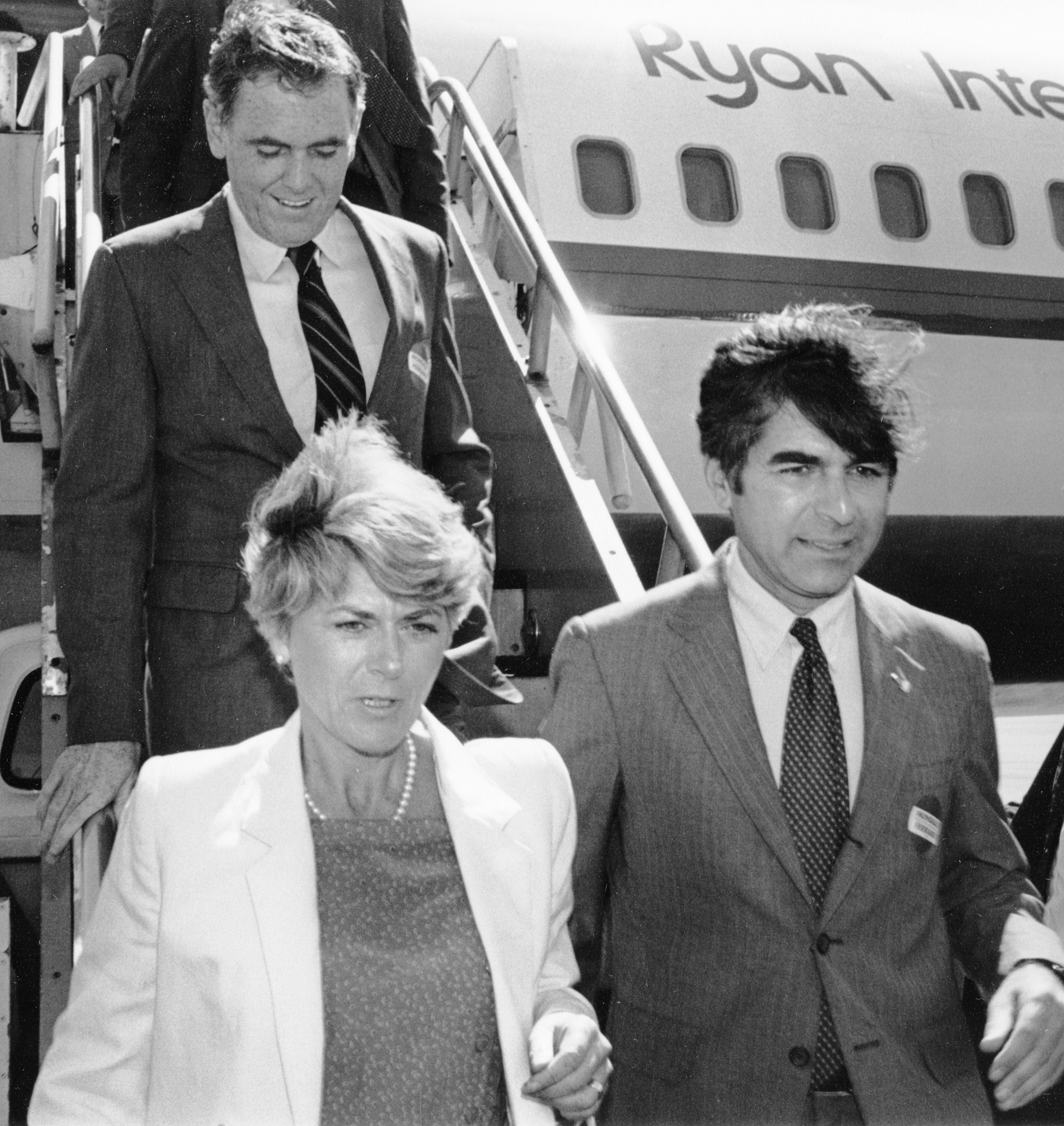
Ferraro with Massachusetts Governor Michael Dukakis and Boston Mayor Raymond Flynn campaigning in the 1984 presidential election

By the last week of July, however, questions—due initially to reporting by The New York Times—began about Ferraro's finances, the finances of her husband, John Zaccaro, and their separately filed tax returns. (While the Mondale campaign had anticipated some questions, it had only spent 48 hours on vetting Ferraro's family's finances.) This was also the first time the American media had to deal with a national candidate's husband.

Ferraro said she would release both their returns within a month, but maintained she was correct not to have included her husband's financial holdings on her past annual congressional disclosure statements. The media also reported on the FEC's past investigation into Ferraro's 1978 campaign funds. Although Ferraro and Zaccaro's finances were often interwoven on paper, with each half partners in Zaccaro's company, Ferraro had little knowledge of his business, or even how much he was worth. Zaccaro did not understand the greater public exposure that his wife's new position brought to their family, and resisted releasing his financial information. On August 12, Ferraro announced that her husband would not in fact be releasing his tax returns, on the grounds that to do so would disadvantage his real estate business and that such a disclosure was voluntary and not part of election law. She joked, "So you people married to Italian men, you know what it's like." (Note: See Associated Press filing: "Ferraro Alters Disclosure Vow". The Indianapolis News. Associated Press. August 13, 1984. p. 4 – via Newspapers.com. This remark was alternately reported as, "If you're married to an Italian man, you know what it's like." See United Press International filing: "Ferraro Won't Release Husband's Tax Returns". The Town Talk. Alexandria, Louisiana. United Press International. August 13, 1984. p. B-7 – via Newspapers.com. Ferraro's 1985 memoir uses a variation of the first formulation: "'You people who are married to Italian men, you know what it's like,' I quipped." See Ferraro, My Story, p. 156.)

The tax announcement dominated television and newspapers, as Ferraro was besieged by questions regarding her family finances. Furthermore, her remark about Italian men brought criticism for ethnic stereotyping, especially from fellow Italian Americans. As she later wrote, "I had created a monster." Republicans saw her finances as a "genderless" issue that they could attack Ferraro with without creating a backlash, and some Mondale staffers thought Ferraro might have to leave the ticket. The New York Tribune, followed by The Philadelphia Inquirer and a few other mainstream newspapers, went even further in their investigations, reporting that Zaccaro was the landlord of a company owned by pornography tycoon and Gambino crime family member Robert DiBernardo. Many other newspapers minimized their coverage of possible connections between Zaccaro and the mob, however, and law enforcement officials downplayed the allegations.

A week after her previous statement, Ferraro said Zaccaro had changed his mind and would indeed release his tax records, which was done on August 20. The full statements included notice of payment of some $53,000 in back federal taxes that she owed due to what was described as an accountant's error. Ferraro said the statements proved overall that she had nothing to hide and that there had been no financial wrongdoing. The disclosures indicated that Ferraro and her husband were worth nearly $4 million, had a full-time maid, and owned a boat and the two vacation homes. While a portion of their wealth was held in real estate rather than disposable income, Ferrero's rags-to-riches image was subsequently altered. On August 22, Ferraro addressed the disclosures in a press conference. No campaign issue during the 1984 presidential campaign received more media attention than Ferraro's finances. The public discourse hindered the campaign's messaging.

Ferraro received criticism from the Catholic Church during the campaign, with abortion opponents protesting her appearances. In a 1982 briefing for Congress, Ferraro wrote that "the Catholic position on abortion is not monolithic and there can be a range of personal and political responses to the issue." Ferraro was criticized by Cardinal John O'Connor, the Catholic Archbishop of New York, and James Timlin, the Bishop of Scranton, for misrepresenting the Catholic Church's position on abortion. After discourse in the public media, Ferraro stated that, "the Catholic Church's position on abortion is monolithic" but later stated, "But do believe that there are a lot of Catholics who do not share the view of the Catholic Church". Ferraro was also criticized for saying that Reagan was not a "good Christian" because, she said, his policies allegedly hurt the poor. To defend Ferraro, the pro-choice group Catholics for a Free Choice placed an October 7, 1984, full-page ad in The New York Times titled "A Catholic Statement on Pluralism and Abortion".

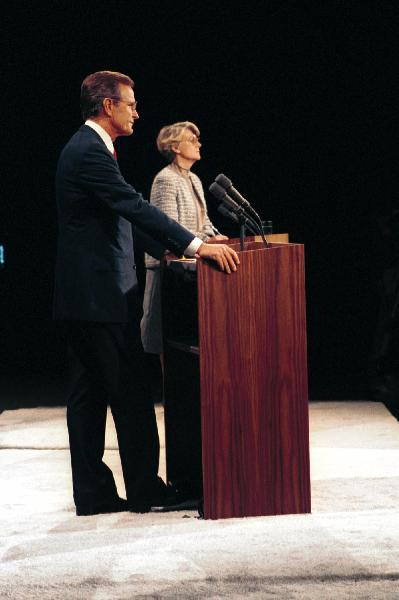
Ferraro and Vice President George H. W. Bush at the 1984 vice presidential debate

Ferraro drew large crowds on the campaign trail, many of whom wished to see the history-making candidate in person, who often chanted, "Ger-ry! Ger-ry!" Mondale and Ferraro rarely touched during their appearances together, to the point that he would not even place his palm on her back when they stood side by side; Ferraro later said this was because anything more and "people were afraid that it would look like, 'Oh, my God, they're dating.'".

There was one vice-presidential debate between Ferraro and Vice President George H. W. Bush. Held on October 11, the result was proclaimed mostly even by the press and historians; women voters tended to think Ferraro had won, while men, Bush. At it, Ferraro criticized Reagan's initial refusal to support an extension to the Voting Rights Act. Her experience was questioned at the debate and she was asked how her three terms in Congress stacked up with Bush's extensive government experience. To one Bush statement she said, "Let me just say first of all, that I almost resent, Vice President Bush, your patronizing attitude that you have to teach me about foreign policy." She strongly defended her position on abortion, which earned her applause and a respectful reply from her opponent. In the days leading up to the debate, Second Lady of the United States Barbara Bush had publicly referred to Ferraro as "that four-million-dollar—I can't say it, but it rhymes with 'rich'." Barbara Bush soon apologized, saying she had not meant to imply Ferraro was "a witch". Peter Teeley, Vice President Bush's press secretary, said of Ferraro just prior to the debate, "She's too bitchy. She's very arrogant. Humility isn't one of her strong points and I think that comes through." Teeley declined to apologize for the remark, saying it had no sexist implications and the Ferraro campaign was being "hypersensitive" in complaining about it.

On October 18 the New York Post accurately reported that Ferraro's father had been arrested for possession of numbers slips in Newburgh shortly before his death, and inaccurately speculated that something mysterious had been covered up about that death. Ferraro's mother had never told her about his arrest; she had been also arrested as an accomplice but released after her husband's death. The printing of the story led Ferraro to state that Post publisher Rupert Murdoch "does not have the worth to wipe the dirt under [my mother's] shoes."

Ferraro's womanhood was consistently discussed during the campaign; one study found that a quarter of newspaper articles written about her contained gendered language. Throughout, Ferraro kept campaigning, taking on the traditional running-mate role of attacking the opposition vigorously. By the end, she had traveled more than Mondale and more than Reagan and Bush combined.

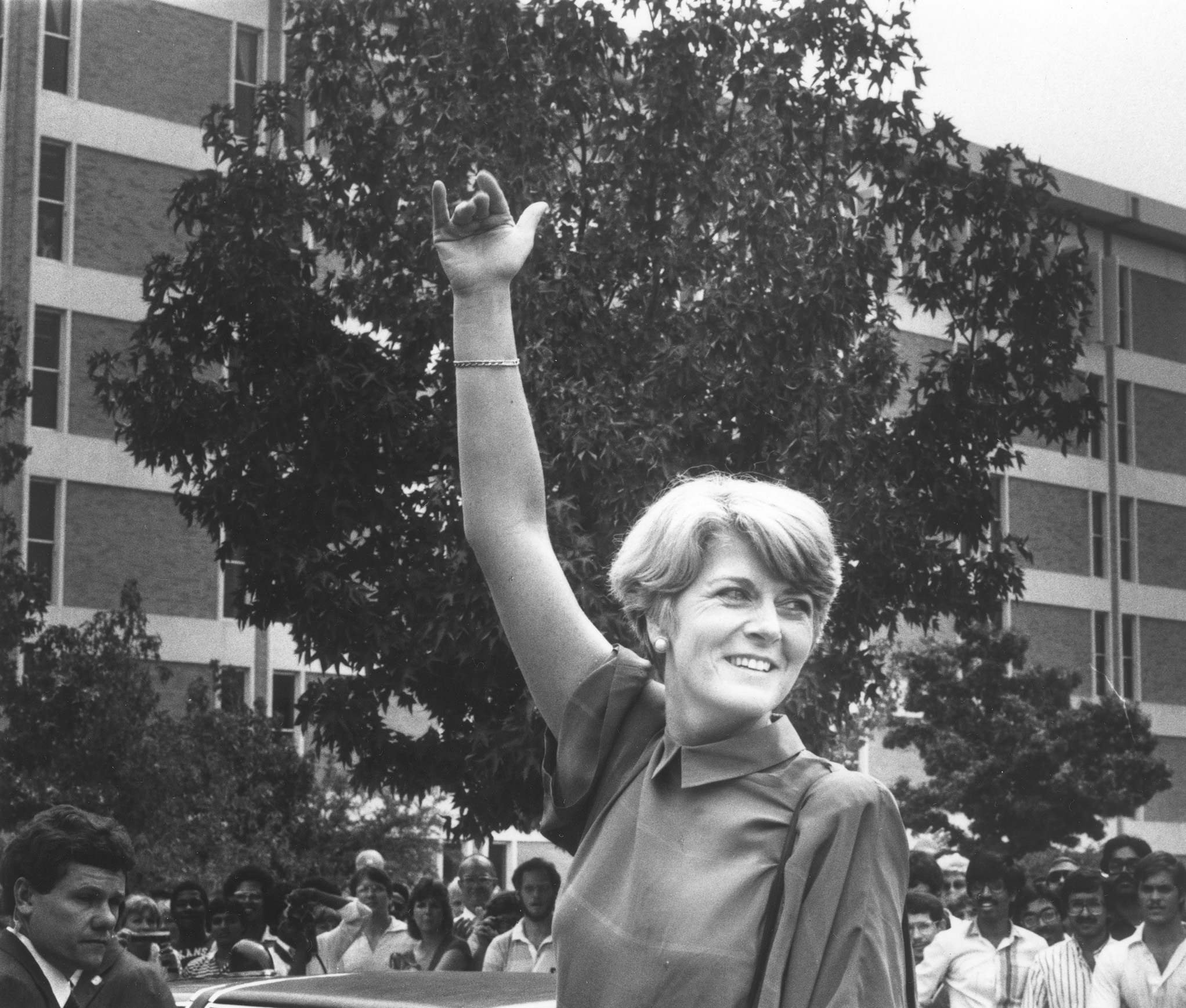
Ferraro at the University of Texas at Arlington in September 1984

On November 6, Mondale and Ferraro lost the general election in a landslide. They received only 41 percent of the popular vote compared to Reagan and Bush's 59 percent, and in the Electoral College won only Mondale's home state of Minnesota and the District of Columbia. The ticket even lost Ferraro's congressional district, which had long been one of the more conservative districts in New York City; it tended to vote Republican in presidential races. Ferraro's presence on the ticket had little measurable effect overall. Reagan captured 55 percent of women voters and about the same share of Catholic voters, the latter being the highest level yet for a Republican presidential candidate. Of the tenth of voters who decided based on the vice-presidential candidates, 54 percent went to Mondale–Ferraro, establishing that Ferraro provided a net gain to the Democrats of 0.8 percent. Reagan's personal appeal and campaign themes of prosperity and "It's morning again in America" were quite strong, while Mondale's liberal campaign alienated Southern whites and northern blue-collar workers who usually voted Democratic. Political observers generally agree that no combination of Democrats could have won the election in 1984. Mondale himself would later reflect that "I knew that I was in for it with Reagan" and that he had no regrets about choosing Ferraro.

After the election, the House Ethics Committee found that Ferraro had technically violated the Ethics in Government Act by failing to report, or reporting incorrectly, details of her family's finances, and that she should have reported her husband's holdings on her congressional disclosure forms. However, the committee concluded that she had acted without "deceptive intent", and since she was leaving Congress anyway, no action against her was taken. Ferraro said, "I consider myself completely vindicated." The scrutiny of her husband and his business dealings presaged a trend that women candidates would face in American electoral politics.

Ferraro is one of only four U.S. women to run on a major party national ticket. The others are Sarah Palin, the 2008 Republican vice-presidential nominee; Hillary Clinton, the 2016 Democratic presidential nominee; and Kamala Harris, the 2020 Democratic vice-presidential nominee and the 2024 Democratic presidential nominee.

The campaign lead to the greater adoption of the honorific "Ms." Although The New York Times denied use of the honorific in reference to Ferraro, the paper's iconoclastic columnist and language expert William Safire suggested that it be incorporated in English language, noting that Ferraro was a married woman who used her birth surname professionally rather than her husband's (Zaccaro). Safire wrote in August 1984 that it would be equally incorrect to call her "Miss Ferraro" (as she was married) or "Mrs. Ferraro" (as her husband was not "Mr. Ferraro", although this is the formulation the Times used), and that calling her "Mrs. Zaccaro" would confuse the reader. Two years after the campaign, the Times changed its policy and began using "Ms."

== Post-1984 election activity ==
Ferraro had relinquished her House seat to run for the vice presidency. Her new-found fame led to an appearance in a Diet Pepsi commercial in 1985. She published Ferraro: My Story, an account of the campaign with some of her life leading up to it, in November 1985. It was a best seller and earned her $1 million. She also earned over $300,000 by giving speeches.

Despite the one-sided national loss in 1984, Ferraro was still viewed as someone with a bright political future. Many expected her to run in the 1986 United States Senate election in New York against first-term Republican incumbent Al D'Amato, and during 1985 she did Upstate New York groundwork towards that end. A Senate candidacy had been her original plan for her career, before she was named to Mondale's ticket. But in December 1985, she said she would not run, due to an ongoing U.S. Justice Department probe on her and her husband's finances stemming from the 1984 campaign revelations.

Members of Ferraro's family were indeed facing legal issues. Her husband John Zaccaro had pleaded guilty in January 1985 to fraudulently obtaining bank financing in a real estate transaction and had been sentenced to 150 hours of community service. Then, in October 1986, he was indicted on unrelated felony charges regarding an alleged 1981 bribery of Queens Borough President Donald Manes concerning a cable television contract. A full year later, he was acquitted at trial. The case against him was circumstantial, a key prosecution witness proved unreliable, and the defense did not have to present its own testimony. Ferraro said her husband never would have been charged had she not run for vice president. Meanwhile, in February 1986, the couple's son John had been arrested for possession and sale of cocaine. He was convicted, and in June 1988, sentenced to four months' imprisonment; Ferraro broke down in tears in court relating the stress the episode had placed on her family. Ferraro worked on an unpublished book about the conflicting rights between a free press and being able to have fair trials. Asked in September 1987 whether she would have accepted the vice presidential nomination had she known of all the family problems that would follow, she said, "More than once I have sat down and said to myself, oh, God, I wish I had never gone through with it ... I think the candidacy opened a door for women in national politics, and I don't regret that for one minute. I'm proud of that. But I just wish it could have been done in a different way."

Ferraro remained active in raising money for Democratic candidates nationwide, especially women candidates. She founded the Americans Concerned for Tomorrow political action committee, which focused on getting ten women candidates elected in the 1986 congressional elections (eight of whom would be successful). During the 1988 presidential election, Ferraro served as vice chair of the party's Victory Fund.

She also did some commentating for television. Ferraro was a fellow at the Harvard Institute of Politics from 1988 to 1992, teaching in-demand seminars such as "So You Want to be President?" She also took care of her mother, who suffered from emphysema for several years before her death in early 1990.

=== First U.S. Senate run ===
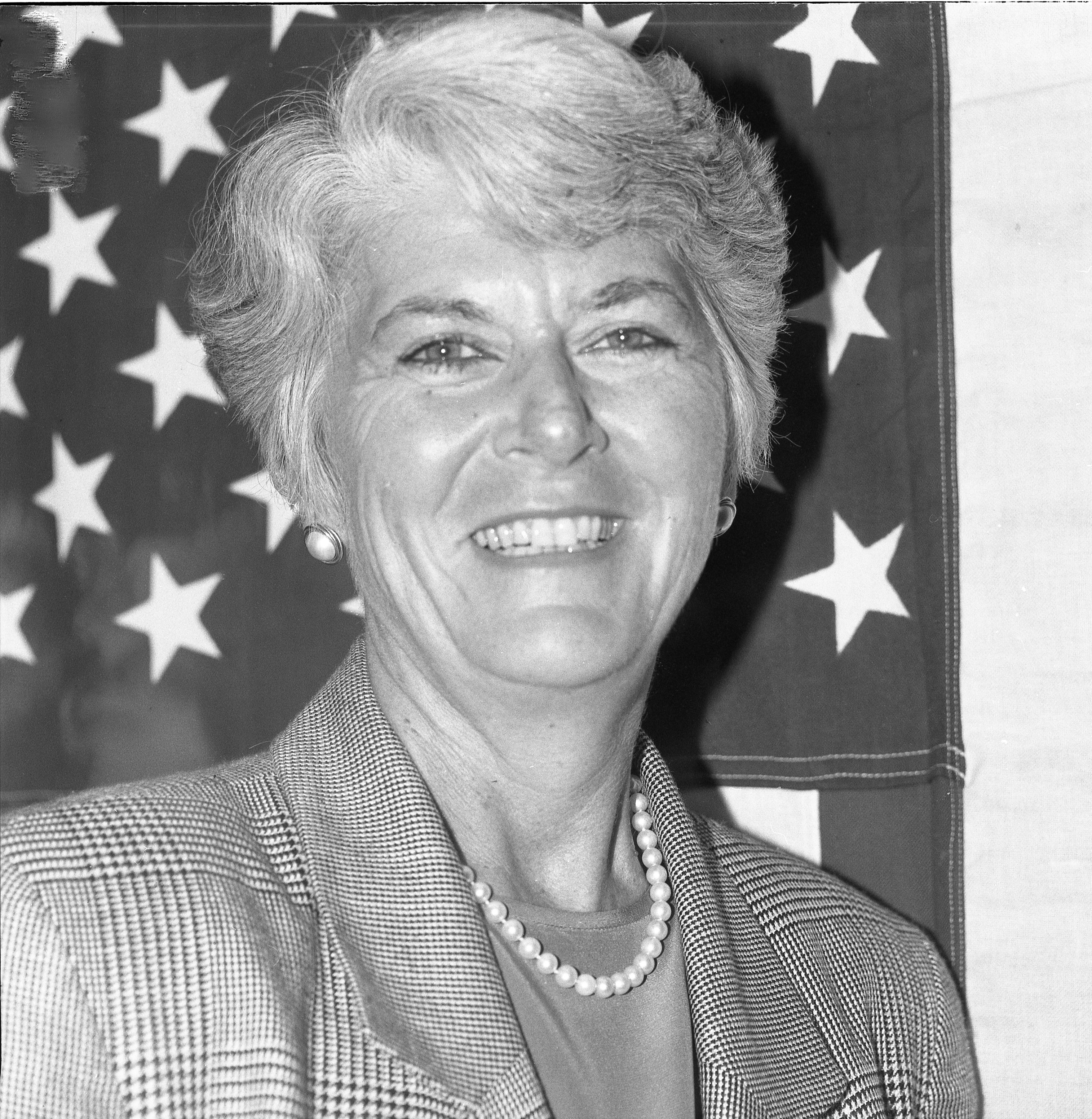
Ferraro at an upstate New York union hall appearance in 1992

By October 1991, Ferraro was ready to enter elective politics again, and ran for the Democratic nomination in the 1992 United States Senate election in New York. Her opponents were State Attorney General Robert Abrams, Reverend Al Sharpton, Congressman Robert J. Mrazek, and New York City Comptroller and former Congresswoman Elizabeth Holtzman. Abrams was considered the early front-runner. The D'Amato campaign feared facing Ferraro the most among these, as her Italian ancestry, effective debating and stump speech skills, and her staunch pro-choice views would eat into several of D'Amato's usual bases of support. Ferraro emphasized her career as a teacher, prosecutor, congresswoman, and mother, and talked about how she was tough on crime. Ferraro drew renewed attacks during the primary campaign from the media and her opponents over Zaccaro's finances and business relationships. She objected that a male candidate would not receive nearly as much attention regarding his wife's activities. Ferraro became the front-runner, capitalizing on her star power from 1984, and using the campaign attacks against her as an explicitly feminist rallying point for women voters. As the primary date neared, her lead began to dwindle under the charges, and she released additional tax returns from the 1980s to try to defray the attacks.

Holtzman, who was trailing in polls, borrowed over $400,000 from Fleet Bank to run a negative ad accusing Ferraro and Zaccaro of taking more than $300,000 in rent in the 1980s from the DiBernardo-run pornography company whose presence in Zaccaro's building had been raised during her 1984 vice-presidential campaign. Ferraro said there had been efforts to oust the company at the time, but they had remained in the building for three more years. In addition, a report by an investigator for the New York State Organized Crime Task Force found its way to the media via a tip from a Holtzman aide; it said that Zaccaro had been seen meeting with DiBernardo in 1985. Ferraro said in response that those two had never met.

The final debates were nasty, and Holtzman in particular constantly attacked Ferraro's integrity and finances. In an unusual election-eve television broadcast, Ferraro talked about "the ethnic slur that I am somehow or other connected to organized crime. There's lots of innuendo but no proof. However, it is made plausible because of the fact that I am an Italian-American. This tactic comes from the poisoned well of fear and stereotype ..." In the September 15, 1992, primary, Abrams edged out Ferraro by less than a percentage point, winning 37 percent of the vote to 36 percent, with Sharpton and Holtzman well behind. Ferraro did not concede she had lost for two weeks.

Abrams spent much of the remainder of the campaign trying to get Ferraro's endorsement. Ferraro, enraged and bitter after the nature of the primary, ignored Abrams and accepted Bill Clinton's request to campaign for his presidential bid instead. She was eventually persuaded by Governor Mario Cuomo and state party leaders into giving an unenthusiastic endorsement with just three days to go before the general election, in exchange for an apology by Abrams for the tone of the primary. D'Amato won the election by a very narrow margin. Overall the 1992 U.S. Senate elections saw five victories that it became known as the "Year of the Woman". The Ferraro-Holtzman fighting of the campaign was viewed as a disaster by many feminists, however, with Ferraro denied her political comeback while Holtzman also politically damaged herself. The feud between Ferraro and Holtzman from the 1992 Senate primary lingered, as the following year Ferraro supported Assemblyman Alan Hevesi's successful primary challenge that unseated Holtzman as New York City Comptroller; Ferraro denied that her endorsement was motivated by revenge against Holtzman, saying it was due to Hevesi's liberal State Assembly voting record.

Following the Senate primary loss, Ferraro became a managing partner in the New York office of Keck, Mahin & Cate, a Chicago-based law firm. There she organized the office and spoke with clients, but did not actively practice law and left before the firm fell into difficulties. Ferraro's second book, a collection of her speeches, was titled Changing History: Women, Power and Politics and was published in 1993.

=== Ambassador to the United Nations Commission on Human Rights (1993–1996) ===
President Clinton appointed Ferraro as a member of the United States delegation to the United Nations Commission on Human Rights in January 1993. She attended the June 1993 World Conference on Human Rights in Vienna as the alternate U.S. delegate. Then in October 1993, Clinton promoted her to be United States Ambassador to the United Nations Commission on Human Rights, saying that Ferraro had been "a highly effective voice for the human rights of women around the world." The Clinton administration named Ferraro vice-chair of the U.S. delegation to the landmark September 1995 Fourth World Conference on Women in Beijing; in this role she picked a strong team of experts in human rights issues to serve with her. During her stint on the commission, it for the first time condemned anti-Semitism as a human rights violation, and also for the first time prevented China from blocking a motion criticizing its human rights record. Regarding a previous China motion that had failed, Ferraro had told the commission, "Let us do what we were sent here to do—decide important questions of human rights on their merits, not avoid them." Ferraro held the U.N. position into 1996.

=== Commentator and second U.S. Senate run ===
In February 1996, Ferraro joined the high-visibility CNN political talk show Crossfire, as the co-host representing the "from the left" vantage. She kept her brassy, rapid-fire speech and New York accent intact, and her trial experience from her prosecutor days was a good fit for the program's format. She sparred effectively with "from the right" co-host Pat Buchanan, for whom she developed a personal liking. The show stayed strong in ratings for CNN, and the job was lucrative. She welcomed how the role "keeps me visible [and] keeps me extremely well informed on the issues."

At the start of 1998, Ferraro left Crossfire and ran for the Democratic nomination again in the 1998 United States Senate election in New York. The other candidates were Congressman Chuck Schumer and New York City Public Advocate Mark Green. She had done no fundraising, out of fear of conflict of interest with her Crossfire job, but was nonetheless immediately perceived as the front-runner. Indeed, December and January polls had her 25 percentage points ahead of Green in the race and even further ahead of Schumer. Unlike the previous campaigns, her family finances never became an issue. However, she lost ground during the summer, with Schumer catching up in the polls by early August and then soon passing her. Schumer, a tireless fundraiser, outspent her by a five-to-one margin, and Ferraro failed to establish a political image current with the times. In the September 15, 1998 primary, she was beaten soundly by Schumer by a 51 percent to 26 percent margin. Unlike 1992, the contest was not divisive, and Ferraro and third-place finisher Green endorsed Schumer at a unity breakfast the following day. Schumer would go on to decisively unseat D'Amato in the general election.

The 1998 primary defeat brought an end to Ferraro's political career. The New York Times wrote at the time: "If Ms. Ferraro's rise was meteoric, her political career's denouement was protracted, often agonizing and, at first glance, baffling." She still retained admirers, though. Anita Perez Ferguson, president of the National Women's Political Caucus, noted that female New York political figures in the past had been reluctant to enter the state's notoriously fierce primary races, and said: "This woman has probably been more of an opinion maker than most people sitting for six terms straight in the House of Representatives or Senate. Her attempts, and even her losses, have accomplished far beyond what others have accomplished by winning."

== Business career, illness and medical activism ==
In 1980, Ferraro co-founded the National Organization of Italian American Women, which sought to support the educational and professional goals of its members and put forward positive role models in order to fight ethnic stereotyping, and was still a distinguished member of its board at the time of her death. Ferraro was connected with many other political and non-profit organizations. She was a board member of the National Democratic Institute for International Affairs, and a member of the Council on Foreign Relations. She became president of the newly established International Institute for Women's Political Leadership in 1989. In 1992, she was on the founding board of Project Vote Smart. By 1993, she was serving on the Fordham Law School Board of Visitors, as well as on the boards of the National Breast Cancer Research Fund, the New York Easter Seal Society, and the Pension Rights Center, and was one of hundreds of public figures on the Planned Parenthood Federation of America's Board of Advocates. In 1999, she joined the board of the Bertarelli Foundation, and in 2003, the board of the National Women's Health Resource Center. During the 2000s she was on the board of advisors to the Committee to Free Lori Berenson.

Framing a Life: A Family Memoir was published by Ferraro in November 1998. It depicts the life story of her mother and immigrant grandmother; it also portrays the rest of her family, and is a memoir of her early life, but includes relatively little about her political career.

Ferraro had felt unusually tired at the end of her second Senate campaign. In November 1998, she was diagnosed with multiple myeloma, a form of blood cancer where plasma cells secrete abnormal antibodies known as Bence-Jones proteins, which can cause bones to disintegrate and dump toxic amounts of calcium into the bloodstream. She did not publicly disclose the illness until June 2001, when she went to Washington to successfully press in congressional hearings for passage of the Hematological Cancer Research Investment and Education Act. A portion of the Act created the Geraldine Ferraro Cancer Education Program, which directs the U.S. Secretary of Health and Human Services to establish an education program for patients of blood cancers and the general public. Ferraro became a frequent speaker on the disease, and an avid supporter and honorary board member of the Multiple Myeloma Research Foundation.

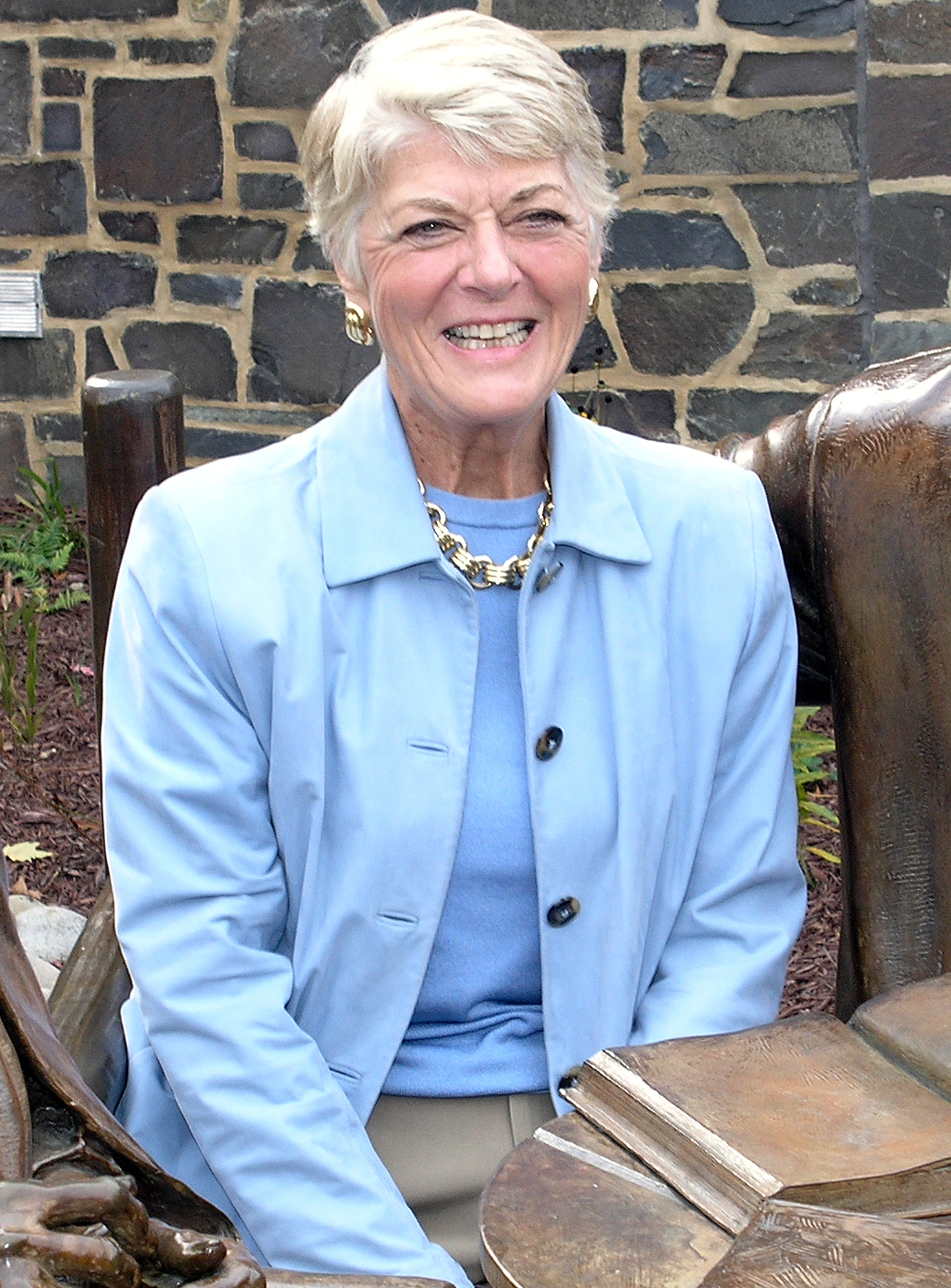
Ferraro visiting the Franklin D. Roosevelt Presidential Library and Museum in 2004

Though initially given only three to five years to live, by virtue of several new drug therapies and a bone marrow transplant in 2005, she would beat the disease's Stage 1 survival mean of 62 months by over a factor of two. Her advocacy helped make the new treatments approved and available for others as well. For much of the last decade of her life, Ferraro was not in remission, but the disease was managed by continually adjusting her treatments.

Ferraro joined Fox News Channel as a regular political commentator in October 1999. By 2005, she was making sporadic appearances on the channel, which continued into 2007, and beyond. She partnered with Laura Ingraham, starting in December 1999, in writing the alternate-weeks column "Campaign Countdown" on the 2000 presidential election for The New York Times Syndicate. During the 2000s, Ferraro was an affiliated faculty member at the Georgetown Public Policy Institute.

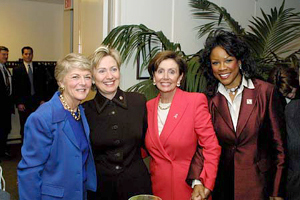
Ferraro (left) marked Women's History Month in 2003, with Senator Hillary Clinton, House Minority Leader Nancy Pelosi, and opera singer Denyce Graves.

In January 2000, Ferraro and Lynn Martin—a former Republican Congresswoman and U.S. Secretary of Labor who had played Ferraro in George H. W. Bush's debate preparations in 1984—co-founded, and served as co-presidents of, G&L Strategies, a management consulting firm underneath Weber McGinn. Its goal was to advise corporations on how to develop more women leaders and make their workplaces more amenable to female employees. G&L Strategies subsequently became part of Golin Harris International. In June 2003, Ferraro was made executive vice president and managing director of the public affairs practice of the Global Consulting Group, an international investor relations and corporate communications component of Huntsworth. There she worked with corporations, non-profit organizations, state governments and political figures. She continued there as a senior advisor working about two days a month.

After living for many years in Forest Hills Gardens, Queens, she and her husband moved to Manhattan in 2002. She republished Ferraro: My Story in 2004, with a postscript summarizing her life in the twenty years since the campaign.

Ferraro was a member of the board of directors of Goodrich Petroleum beginning in August 2003. She was also a board member for New York Bancorp in the 1990s.

Ferraro became a principal in the government relations practice of the Blank Rome law firm in February 2007, working both in New York and Washington about two days a week in their lobbying and communications activities. As she passed the age of 70, she was thankful for still being alive, and said "This is about as retired as I get, which is part time," and that if she fully retired, she would "go nuts".

== Involvement in the 2008 presidential election ==
In December 2006, Ferraro announced her support for Democratic presidential candidate Hillary Clinton. Later, she vowed to help defend Clinton from being "swiftboated" in a manner akin to 2004 presidential candidate John Kerry. She assisted with fundraising by assuming an honorary post on the finance committee for Clinton's 2008 presidential campaign.

A heated nomination battle emerged between Clinton and Barack Obama. Ferraro became livid and distraught when one of her daughters voted for Obama in the Massachusetts primary, saying "What is the matter with you? You know Hillary. You have seen my involvement with her." When her daughter responded by noting that Obama was inspirational, Ferraro snapped, "What does he inspire you to do, leave your husband and three kids and your practice and go work for Doctors Without Borders?" This was seen as an example of a generational difference among American women; in contrast to Ferraro's generation, younger women saw nothing special about electing a woman president (especially one with Clinton's history) compared to what writer Anne Kornblut called "the milestone of electing an African American president". According to Kornblut, younger voters saw "Clinton [as] both a relic of that era and a victim of its success. She was the wrong woman at the wrong time; she was a Clinton; she hadn't gotten there on her own".

The campaign between the two also saw racial dust-ups caused by perceptions of remarks made by campaign surrogates. In March 2008, Ferraro gave an interview with the Daily Breeze in which she said: "If Obama was a white man, he would not be in this position. And if he was a woman (of any color) he would not be in this position. He happens to be very lucky to be who he is. And the country is caught up in the concept." (Ferraro had made a similar comment in 1988 disparaging Jesse Jackson's candidacy in the party's presidential primaries, saying that because of his "radical" views, "if Jesse Jackson were not black, he wouldn't be in the race.") Ferraro justified the statements by referring to her own run for vice president. Echoing a statement she wrote about herself in 1988, Ferraro said that "I was talking about historic candidacies and what I started off by saying (was that) if you go back to 1984 and look at my historic candidacy, which I had just talked about all these things, in 1984, if my name was Gerard Ferraro instead of Geraldine Ferraro, I would have never been chosen as a vice-presidential candidate. It had nothing to do with my qualification." Her comments resonated with some older white women, but generated an immediate backlash elsewhere. There was strong criticism and charges of racism from many supporters of Obama and Obama called them "patently absurd". Clinton publicly expressed disagreement with Ferraro's remarks, while Ferraro vehemently denied she was a racist. Again speaking to the Breeze, Ferraro responded to the attacks by saying: "I really think they're attacking me because I'm white. How's that?" Ferraro resigned from Clinton's finance committee on March 12, 2008, two days after the firestorm began, saying that she didn't want the Obama camp to use her comments to hurt Clinton's campaign.

Ferraro continued to engage the issue and criticize the Obama campaign via her position as a Fox News Channel contributor. By early April, Ferraro said people were deluging her with negative comments and trying to get her removed from one of the boards she was on: "This has been the worst three weeks of my life." Ferraro stated in mid-May 2008 that Clinton had "raised this whole woman candidate thing to a whole different level than when I ran". She thought Obama had behaved in a sexist manner and that she might not vote for him.

During September 2008, Ferraro gained attention yet again after the announcement of Sarah Palin as the Republican vice-presidential nominee, the first such major party bid for a woman since her own in 1984. Palin mentioned Ferraro as well as Clinton as forerunners in her introductory appearance. In reaction to the nomination, Ferraro said, "It's great to be the first, but I don't want to be the only. And so now it is wonderful to see a woman on a national ticket." Ferraro speculated that the pick might win Republican presidential nominee John McCain the election, but said that she was supporting Obama now due to his running mate selection of Joe Biden having resolved her concerns about Obama's lack of experience in certain areas. Ferraro criticized the media's scrutiny of Palin's background and family as gender-based and saw parallels with how she was treated by the media during her own run; a University of Alabama study also found that media framing of Ferraro and Palin was similar and often revolved around their nominations being political gambles. A Newsweek cover story detected a change in how women voters responded to a female vice presidential candidate from Ferraro's time to Palin's, but Ferraro correctly predicted that the bounce that McCain received from the Palin pick would dissipate. In a friendly joint retrospective of her 1984 debate with George H. W. Bush, Ferraro said she had had more national issues experience in 1984 than Palin did now, but that it was important that Palin make a good showing in her vice presidential debate so that "little girls [could] see someone there who can stand toe to toe with [Biden]." While McCain and Palin lost the election, Ferraro said that "Every time a woman runs, women win."

== Later years and death ==
After her 1998 diagnosis, Ferraro continued to battle multiple myeloma, making repeated visits to hospitals during her last year and undergoing difficult procedures. Much of her care took place at Dana–Farber Cancer Institute in Boston, where she also acted as an informal advocate for other patients. She was able to make a joint appearance with Palin on Fox News Channel's coverage of the November 2010 midterm elections.

In March 2011 she went to Massachusetts General Hospital to receive treatment for pain caused by a fracture, a common complication of multiple myeloma. Once there, however, doctors discovered she had come down with pneumonia. Unable to return to her New York home, Ferraro died at Massachusetts General on March 26, 2011. In addition to her husband and three children, who were all present, she was survived by eight grandchildren.

President Obama said upon her death that "Geraldine will forever be remembered as a trailblazer who broke down barriers for women, and Americans of all backgrounds and walks of life", and said that his own two daughters would grow up in a more equal country because of what Ferraro had done. Mondale called her "a remarkable woman and a dear human being ... She was a pioneer in our country for justice for women and a more open society. She broke a lot of molds and it's a better country for what she did." George H. W. Bush said, "Though we were one-time political opponents, I am happy to say Gerry and I became friends in time – a friendship marked by respect and affection. I admired Gerry in many ways, not the least of which was the dignified and principled manner she blazed new trails for women in politics." Sarah Palin paid tribute to her on Facebook, expressing gratitude for having been able to work with her the year before and saying, "She broke one huge barrier and then went on to break many more. May her example of hard work and dedication to America continue to inspire all women." Bill and Hillary Clinton said in a statement that, "Gerry Ferraro was one of a kind – tough, brilliant, and never afraid to speak her mind or stand up for what she believed in – a New York icon and a true American original."

A funeral Mass was held for her on March 31 at the Church of St. Vincent Ferrer in New York, the site where Ferraro and Zaccaro had been married and had renewed their vows on their 50th anniversary the year before. Figures from local, state, and national politics were present, and Mondale and both Clintons were among the speakers. She is buried in St. John Cemetery in Middle Village, Queens, within her old congressional district.

When Hillary Clinton finally captured the Democratic nomination in the 2016 presidential election, becoming the first woman to do so for a major party, there was considerable media commentary recalling, and relating this to, Ferraro's breakthrough 32 years earlier.

== Awards and honors ==
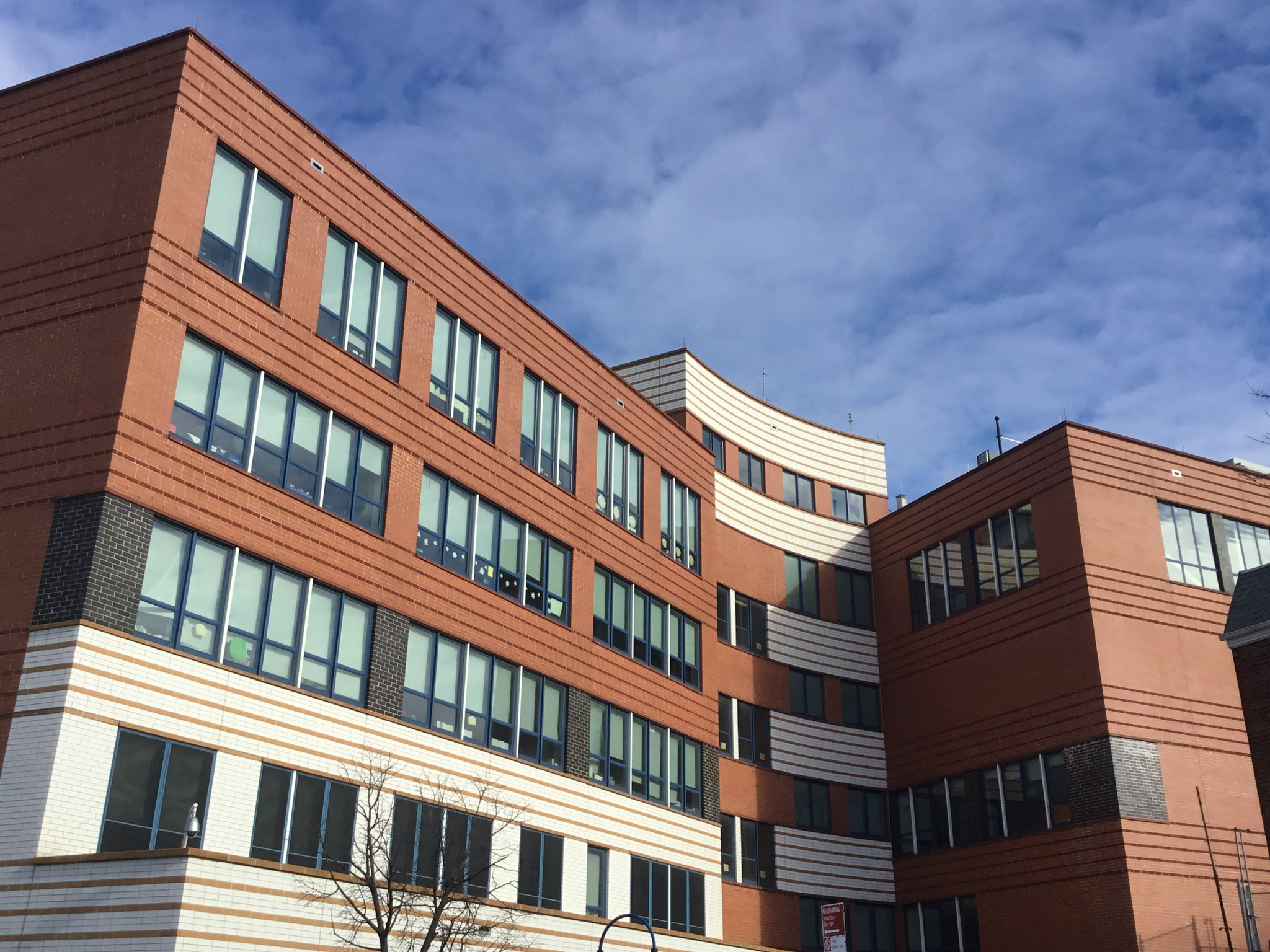
P.S. 290Q Geraldine Ferraro Campus in Queens.

Ferraro was inducted into the National Women's Hall of Fame in 1994.

Ferraro received honorary degrees during the 1980s and early 1990s, from Marymount Manhattan College (1982), New York University Law School (1984), Hunter College (1985), Plattsburgh College (1985), College of Boca Raton (1989), Virginia State University (1989), Muhlenberg College (1990), Briarcliffe College for Business (1990), and Potsdam College (1991). She subsequently received an honorary degree from Case Western Reserve University (2003).

During her time in Congress, Ferraro received numerous awards from local organizations in Queens.

In 2007, Ferraro received a Lifetime Achievement Award from the Sons of Italy Foundation. In 2008, Ferraro was the initial recipient of the annual Trailblazer Award from the National Conference of Women's Bar Associations, and received the Edith I. Spivack Award from the New York County Lawyers' Association. In 2009, legislation passed the House of Representatives calling for a post office in Long Island City in Queens to be renamed for Ferraro, and in 2010, the Geraldine A. Ferraro Post Office was accordingly rededicated.

In the fall of 2013, P.S. 290Q in Ridgewood, Queens, was reopened as the A.C.E. Academy for Scholars on the Geraldine A. Ferraro Campus.

In 2018 she was chosen by the National Women's History Project as one of its honorees for Women's History Month in the United States.

== Electoral history ==
Democratic primary for the 1978 New York's 9th congressional district election

- Geraldine Ferraro – 10,254 (52.98%)
- Thomas J. Manton – 5,499 (28.41%)
- Patrick C. Deignan – 3,603 (18.61%)

1978 New York's 9th congressional district election

- Geraldine Ferraro (D) – 51,350 (54.17%)
- Alfred A. DelliBovi (R, Conservative) – 42,108 (44.42%)
- Theodore E. Garrison (Liberal) – 1,329 (1.40%)

1980 New York's 9th congressional district election

- Geraldine Ferraro (D) (Inc.) – 63,796 (58.34%)
- Vito P. Battista (R, Conservative, Right to Life) – 44,473 (40.67%)
- Gertrude Geniale (Liberal) – 1,091 (1.00%)

1982 New York's 9th congressional district election

- Geraldine Ferraro (D) (Inc.) – 75,286 (73.22%)
- John J. Weigandt (R) – 20,352 (19.79%)
- Ralph G. Groves (Conservative) – 6,011 (5.85%)
- Patricia A. Salargo (Liberal) – 1,171 (1.14%)

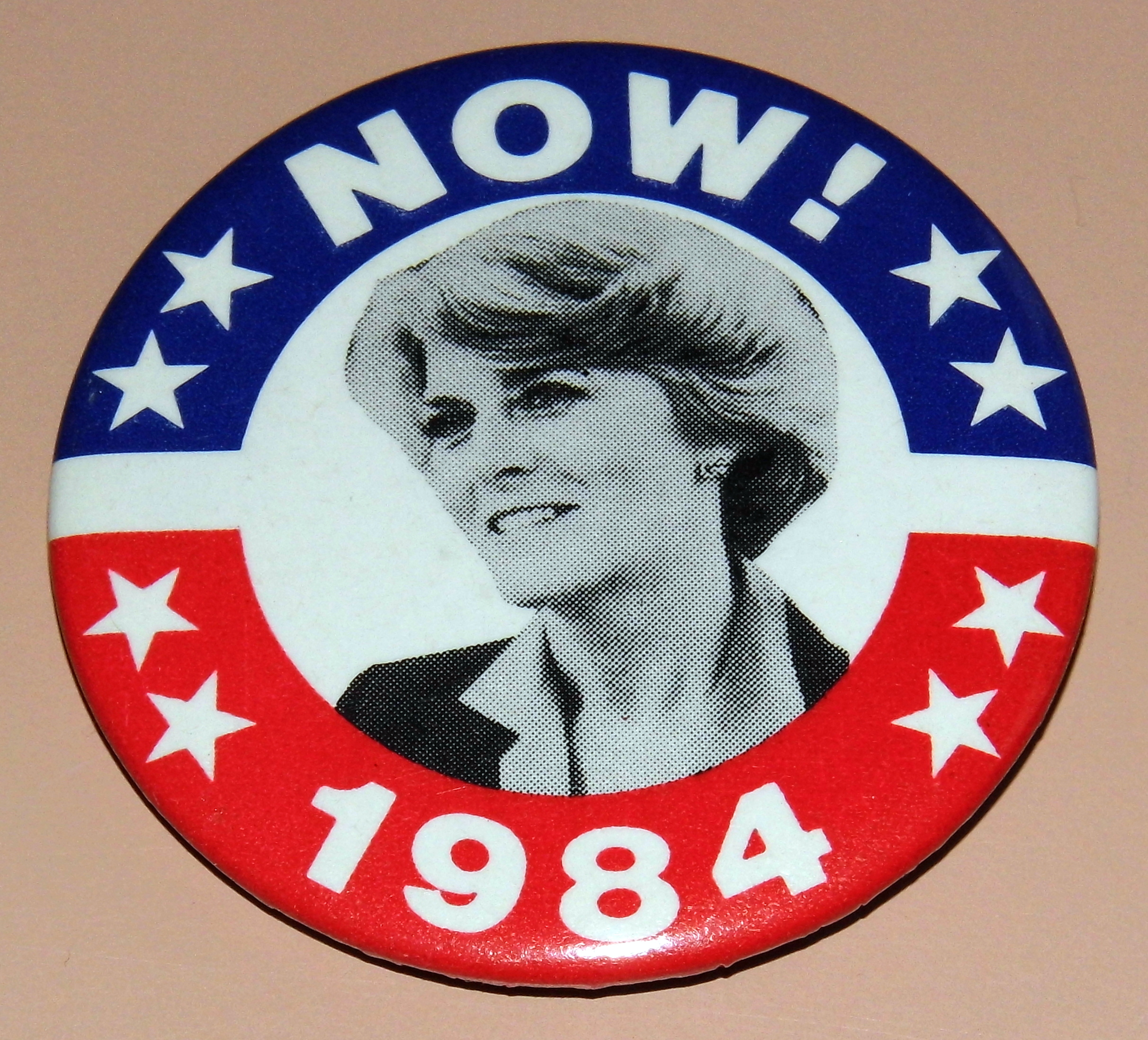
Geraldine Ferraro for Vice President 1984 campaign button

1984 Democratic National Convention (vice-presidential tally) (Note: See Holland, Keating (1996). "All The Votes...Really". CNN. Archived from the original on September 30, 2000. In actuality, the 1984 Democratic vice-presidential roll call only went through Alabama, Alaska, and Arizona. Arkansas then passed to New York; New York cast all its votes for Ferraro; and New York then moved that Ferraro be nominated by acclamation, which was approved by overwhelming voice vote. See Ferraro, My Story, pp. 6–7.)

- Geraldine Ferraro – 3,920
- Shirley Chisholm – 3

1984 United States presidential election

- Ronald Reagan/George H. W. Bush (R) (Inc.) – 54,166,829 (58.5%) and 525 electoral votes (49 states carried)
- Walter Mondale/Geraldine Ferraro (D) – 37,449,813 (40.4%) and 13 electoral votes (1 state and D.C. carried)
- David Bergland/Jim Lewis (L) – 227,204 (0.2%) and 0 electoral votes

Democratic primary for the 1992 U.S. Senate election

- Robert Abrams – 426,904 (37%)
- Geraldine Ferraro – 415,650 (36%)
- Al Sharpton – 166,665 (14%)
- Elizabeth Holtzman – 144,026 (12%)

Democratic primary for the 1998 U.S. Senate election

- Chuck Schumer – 388,701 (50.83%)
- Geraldine Ferraro – 201,625 (26.37%)
- Mark Green – 145,819 (19.07%)
- Eric Ruano-Melendez – 28,493 (3.73%)

== See also ==
- List of female ambassadors of the United States
- List of female United States presidential and vice presidential candidates
- Women in the United States House of Representatives

== General and cited references ==
- Braden, Maria (1996). Women Politicians and the Media. Lexington, Kentucky: The University Press of Kentucky. ISBN 0-8131-1970-7.
- Chesler, Ellen (2005). "Introduction". In Chavkin, Wendy; Chesler, Ellen (eds.). Where Human Rights Begin: Health, Sexuality, and Women in the New Millennium. Rutgers University Press. ISBN 0-8135-3657-X.
- Clift, Eleanor; Brazaitis, Tom (2000). Madam President: Shattering the Last Glass Ceiling. Simon & Schuster. ISBN 0-684-85619-0.
- Falk, Erika (2007). Women for President: Media Bias in Eight Campaigns. University of Illinois Press. ISBN 978-0-252-07511-7.
- Ferraro, Geraldine A.; Francke, Linda Bird (1985). Ferraro: My Story. Bantam Books. ISBN 0-553-05110-5.
- Ferraro, Geraldine A. (1993). Changing History: Women, Power and Politics. Moyer Bell. ISBN 1-55921-077-X.
- Ferraro, Geraldine; Whitney, Catherine (1998). Framing a Life: A Family Memoir. Scribner. ISBN 0-684-85404-X.
- Foerstel, Herbert N. (1996). Climbing the Hill: Gender Conflict in Congress. Greenwood Publishing Group. ISBN 0-275-94914-1.
- Germond, Jack; Witcover, Jules (1985). Wake Us When It's Over: Presidential Politics of 1984. Macmillan Publishing. ISBN 0-02-630710-3.
- Goldman, Peter; Fuller, Tony (1985). The Quest for the Presidency 1984. Bantam Books. ISBN 0-553-05100-8.
- Gottro, Martha V., ed. (1981). Congress and the Nation: A Review of Government and Politics Vol. V: 1977–1980. Congressional Quarterly, Inc. ISBN 0-87187-112-2.
- Cohn, Mary W., ed. (1985). Congress and the Nation: A Review of Government and Politics Vol. VI: 1981–1984. Congressional Quarterly, Inc. ISBN 0-87187-334-6.
- Jamieson, Kathleen Hall (1995). Beyond the Double Bind: Women and Leadership. Oxford University Press. ISBN 0-19-508940-5.
- Kornblut, Anne E. (2009). Notes from the Cracked Ceiling: Hillary Clinton, Sarah Palin, and What It Will Take for a Woman to Win. New York: Crown Books. ISBN 978-0-307-46425-5.
- Light, Paul C.; Lake, Celinda (1985). "The Election: Candidates, Strategies and Decisions". In Nelson, Michael (ed.). The Elections of 1984. Congressional Quarterly, Inc. ISBN 0-87187-330-3.
- Lurie, Leonard (1994). Senator Pothole: The Unauthorized Biography of Al D'Amato. Birch Lane Press. ISBN 1-55972-227-4.
- Moritz, Charles, ed. (1985). Current Biography Yearbook 1984. New York: H. W. Wilson Company.
- Nelson, Michael, ed. (1991). Historic Documents on Presidential Elections 1787–1988. Congressional Quarterly, Inc. ISBN 0-87187-607-8.
- O'Neill, Tip; Novak, William (1987). Man of the House: The Life and Political Memoirs of Speaker Tip O'Neill. Random House. ISBN 0-394-55201-6.
- Patterson, Thomas E.; Dani, Richard (1985). "The Media Campaign: Struggle for the Agenda". In Nelson, Michael (ed.). The Elections of 1984. Congressional Quarterly, Inc. ISBN 0-87187-330-3.
- Prendergast, William B. (1999). The Catholic Vote in American Politics: The Passing of the Democratic Monolith. Washington, D.C.: Georgetown University Press. ISBN 0-87840-724-3.
- Scala, Dante J. (2003). Shade, William G.; Campbell, Ballard C. (eds.). American Presidential Campaigns and Elections. M.E. Sharpe Inc. ISBN 0-7656-8042-4.
- Schumer, Chuck (2007). Positively American: Winning Back the Middle-Class Majority One Family at a Time. Rodale Books. ISBN 978-1-59486-572-5.
- Watson, Robert P.; Gordon, Ann (2003). Anticipating Madam President. Lynne Rienner Publishers. ISBN 1-58826-113-1.
- Who's Who of American Women 2006–2007. New Providence, New Jersey: Marquis Who's Who. 2005. ISBN 0-8379-0432-3.
- Women in Congress, 1917–1990. DIANE Publishing. 1997. ISBN 0-7881-4256-9.

U.S. House of Representatives
Preceded by James Delaney	Member of the U.S. House of Representatives from New York's 9th congressional district 1979–1985	Succeeded by Thomas Manton
Preceded by Shirley Chisholm	Secretary of the House Democratic Caucus; 1981–1985	Succeeded by Mary Oakar
Party political offices
Preceded by Walter Mondale	Democratic nominee for Vice President of the United States; 1984	Succeeded by Lloyd Bentsen
Diplomatic posts
Preceded by Armando Valladares	United States Ambassador to the United Nations Commission on Human Rights; 1993–1996	Succeeded by Nancy Rubin
