= 2008 Massachusetts Republican presidential primary =

- February 5, 2008

43 delegates to the Republican National Convention (40 pledged, 3 unpledged)
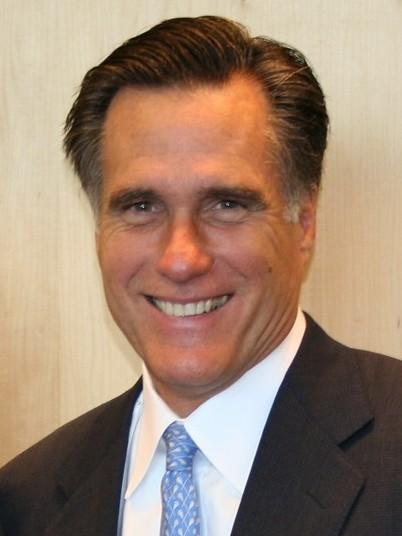

| Nominee | Mitt Romney | John McCain |
| Home state | Massachusetts | Arizona |
| Delegate count | 22 | 18 |
| Popular vote | 255,892 | 204,779 |
| Percentage | 51.92% | 41.68% |
- Election results by county Mitt Romney John McCain

The 2008 Massachusetts Republican presidential primary took place on February 5, 2008, with 40 national delegates. Polls indicated that former Governor of Massachusetts Mitt Romney was leading rival John McCain; Romney ended up defeating McCain by roughly 10% of the vote.

== Results ==
Official results
| Candidate | Votes | Percentage | Delegates |
|---|---|---|---|
| Mitt Romney | 255,892 | 51.12% | 22 |
| John McCain | 204,779 | 40.91% | 18 |
| Mike Huckabee | 19,103 | 3.82% | 0 |
| Ron Paul | 13,251 | 2.65% | 0 |
| Rudy Giuliani* | 2,707 | 0.54% | 0 |
| Fred Thompson* | 916 | 0.18% | 0 |
| Duncan Hunter* | 258 | 0.05% | 0 |
| All others | 1,685 | 0.34% | 0 |
| Uncommitted | 1,959 | 0.39% | 0 |
| Total | 500,550 | 100% | 40 |

* Candidate dropped out of the race before the primary.

== See also ==
- 2008 Massachusetts Democratic presidential primary
