= Anne Kornblut =

American journalist

Anne E. Kornblut
- Born: February 25, 1973 (age 53); McLean, Virginia, U.S.
- Education: Columbia University
- Occupations: Journalist; Author; Facebook employee
- Spouse(s): Mark Orchard (m. 2001; div. 2005?) Jon Cohen (m. 2010)
- Writing career
- Language: English
- Genres: Non-fiction, political
- Subjects: national politics, national security and health/science/environmental coverage.
- Notable works: the Cracked Ceiling: Hillary Clinton; Sarah Palin, and What It Will Take for a Woman to Win.
- Website: www.annekornblut.com

Anne Elise Kornblut (born February 25, 1973) is a Pulitzer Prize–winning American journalist who is currently serving as Vice President of Global Curation at Facebook. Kornblut has previously served as the deputy national editor of The Washington Post, overseeing national politics, national security and health/science/environmental coverage.

== Early life ==
Kornblut was raised in McLean, Virginia, the daughter of Jane (née Slaughter) and the late Arthur T. Kornblut, a lawyer with a practice in Washington, D.C. Her sister Emily is a human rights educator. She was a National Merit Program semifinalist in 1989. She graduated from Holton-Arms School in Bethesda, Maryland in 1990. She is a 1994 graduate of Columbia University.

== Career ==
In early 2007, Kornblut was hired by The Washington Post and became their Deputy National Editor, overseeing national politics, national security and health/science/environmental coverage. In 2013, she was the lead editor overseeing coverage of Edward Snowden's NSA revelations, which won the 2014 Pulitzer Prize for Public Service. In her newsroom remarks on April 14, the day the Pulitzer was announced, she credited a team of more than 28 reporters, producers and designers with creating the winning coverage. "This wasn't just a case of being handed some documents to post online," Kornblut said.

Kornblut formerly worked at The Boston Globe, for which she covered national politics and as an intern at the New York Daily News. A veteran of the 2000 and 2004 presidential races, her political reportage has included stories on the reelection campaign of George W. Bush and the Jack Abramoff lobbying scandal.

Kornblut joined The New York Times in 2005. One of her assignments was to cover the political career and reelection campaign of Senator Hillary Clinton; she thereafter became one of the paper's national political correspondents.

In 2015 Kornblut joined Facebook as its director of strategic communications.

Kornblut has authored a book, Notes from the Cracked Ceiling: Hillary Clinton, Sarah Palin, and What It Will Take for a Woman to Win. It was published by Random House in December 2009.

=== Awards ===
In 2002, she won the White House Correspondents' Association Aldo Beckman Award for her coverage of President George W. Bush’s first year in office.

In 2014, she was awarded the 2014 Pulitzer Prize for Public Service as the lead editor overseeing coverage of Edward Snowden's NSA revelations. Also in 2014, Kornblut was awarded the prestigious Knight Journalism Fellowship at Stanford University. The newsroom announcement that day said she was "coming off a huge triumph" running the NSA coverage and that she would return to her role as deputy national editor at the end of the school year.

== Criticism ==
The Salon.com columnist Glenn Greenwald has claimed that Kornblut reports Republican Party sloganeering as fact. He has also claimed she abused anonymity standards while supplying the sources of statements made by Obama administration officials. The Daily Howler media critic Bob Somerby has leveled similar charges.

=== Allegation by Hillary Clinton Campaign ===
On 11 August 2008, The Atlantic Monthly magazine revealed a letter by The Washington Post's managing editor, dated 11 February 2008, addressed to the Hillary Clinton campaign manager, in which he had protested the assertion made by an addressee's spokesman that Kornblut was fired by The New York Times because of her reporting. The editor rejected the allegation, and defended her reporting as "tough, accurate and fair".

== Personal life ==
In 2001, Kornblut married English-born BBC News producer Mark Orchard, who worked from the Los Angeles office. They divorced sometime before 2005 when Orchard married Savannah Guthrie. In 2010 Kornblut married Jon Cohen, Vice President of Survey Research and the marriage was performed at a restaurant in St. Helena, California. Guests included Campbell Brown who served as a bridesmaid, Campbell's husband Dan Senor who did the Ketubah ceremony, and Jessica Yellin who read a poem. They have two children, son Arlo Levi and daughter Audrey Rose.
