= John Zaccaro =

American real estate developer (born 1933)

- Born: John Anthony Zaccaro; April 5, 1933 (age 93); Brooklyn, New York, U.S.
- Education: Iona College (BBA)
- Occupation: Real estate developer
- Spouse: Geraldine Ferraro (m. 1960; died 2011)
- Children: 3

John Anthony Zaccaro (born April 5, 1933) is an American real estate developer. He is the owner of P. Zaccaro & Company, which was founded by his father Philip Zaccaro. The company acts as a landlord for properties in the Little Italy, Chinatown, and East Side areas of Manhattan and previously in Queens.

Zaccaro is the widower of Geraldine Ferraro, former member of the U.S. House of Representatives from New York and the 1984 Democratic vice presidential nominee on the unsuccessful ticket with former Vice President and presidential nomimee Walter Mondale, which lost overwhelmingly to Republican incumbent President Ronald Reagan and Vice President George H. W. Bush. Ferraro died in 2011. The couple's finances, and his reluctance to make public his tax returns, became a major issue in that 1984 presidential campaign.

== Early life and education ==
Zaccaro was born in the Bay Ridge, Brooklyn neighborhood, to Italian-American parents born in the U.S. When he was an infant, his family moved and he grew up in Forest Hills, Queens. According to a biography issued by the Ferraro campaign in 1984, he attended Loyola School (described as "Loyola Military School") and Rhodes Preparatory School, both in Manhattan. Again, according to the campaign, a severe football injury that occurred at Loyola left him with a 4-F classification and unavailable for the draft, but he nonetheless joined the United States Marine Corps Platoon Leaders Class, becoming a second lieutenant.

According to an account in Ms. Magazine in 1984, he had switched to baseball after the injury and coming out of high school was offered a spot in the Brooklyn Dodgers farm system. He attended Iona College from 1951 to 1955 and graduated with a degree in business administration.

== Real estate career ==
=== Origins through early 1980s ===
Zaccaro started working as a salesman for his father, Phillip J. Zaccaro, who established P. Zaccaro Co., Inc. in 1917. As an agent for the City of New York, the firm managed properties which were condemned by the City, upon which Stuyvesant Town, Peter Cooper Village, and Knickerbocker Village had been built in the 1930s and 1940s. John Zaccaro began as licensed real estate broker in 1951 and became a member of the Real Estate Board of New York in 1955.

In the late 1970s, Zaccaro was appointed a member of the New York City Housing Council. By 1984, Zaccaro's company owned or managed over 20 residential and commercial properties in Manhattan. According to a New York Times article, Zaccaro's buildings had accumulated over 100 code violations. While most of the violations were minor, some were serious, and tenants complained of poor conditions in some of the apartments.

=== Legal problems and impact upon spouse's political campaigns ===
Shortly after Democratic presidential nominee Walter Mondale selected Ferraro as his vice presidential running mate in the 1984 U.S. presidential election, Zaccaro became the center of controversy due to the couple's finances and his refusal to release his separately-filed tax returns. Ultimately they were submitted, but the matter diminished Ferraro's rising stardom and removed the momentum the Mondale–Ferraro ticket gained following the pick. Mondale and Ferraro lost the general election in a landslide to incumbent President Ronald Reagan and incumbent Vice President George H. W. Bush.

In January 1985, Zaccaro pleaded guilty to fraudulently obtaining bank financing in a real estate transaction and was fined $1,000 and was sentenced to 150 hours of community service. Zaccaro stated afterward, "My lawyers have advised me that since my client and I withdrew the loan application, since no one but I was injured, and since I received no benefit, they felt that they could successfully defend this case" but he said he entered the plea to spare his family more publicity and to "conclude the matter and try to return to private life." In October 1986, he was indicted on unrelated felony charges regarding an alleged 1981 bribery of Queens Borough President Donald Manes concerning a cable television contract. A full year later, he was acquitted of all charges at trial.

Zaccaro's business associations have also created controversy. During the 1984 campaign, Zaccaro was revealed to be the owner of a property rented by pornography tycoon and reputed organized crime figure Robert DiBernardo; much of the media minimized their coverage of the matter and law enforcement officials downplayed the allegations. These stories and the couple's finances again became a damaging issue during Ferraro's 1992 Senate Democratic primary campaign. She entered that campaign as the front-runner and lost by a close margin in a bitter primary contest.

=== Subsequent activity ===
Zaccaro is president of P. Zaccaro Co., Inc. He works with his son, John Jr., a licensed attorney and real estate broker. Zaccaro's past clients include the Emigrant Savings Bank, Bowery Savings Bank, and New York University. P. Zaccaro Co., Inc.'s deals have sometimes been valued into the tens of millions of dollars and have involved other New York real estate figures such as Jared Kushner.

== Personal life ==
Zaccaro met Geraldine Ferraro in 1954 when she was a sophomore at Marymount Manhattan College. They became engaged in August 1959 and were married on July 16, 1960. Zaccaro and Ferraro raised three children, Donna (born 1962), John Jr. (born 1964), and Laura (born 1966).
