= The Daily Howler =

American political blog by Bob Somerby

- Website type: Political blog
- Available in: English
- Creator: Bob Somerby
- Website: DailyHowler.blogspot.com
- Launched: April 1, 1998

The Daily Howler is an American political blog written by Bob Somerby. It was perhaps the first major political blog, started in 1998. The style is by turns earnest and sarcastic. Somerby criticizes what he considers the media's frequently biased or lazy coverage. In his view, the media frequently latch on to a generally agreed "script" with little regard for facts that contradict the script. For instance, in the runup to the U.S. 2000 election it was frequently said or assumed that Al Gore was untruthful, but Somerby shows that much of what supposedly underlay that script was in fact untrue, misrepresented or greatly exaggerated. He also argues that the media frequently ignore substantive issues and concentrate on trivial ones instead (in the 2000 presidential election, for example, professing bewilderment in response to the candidates' budget proposals while writing repeatedly and at length about irrelevant issues such as Gore's choice of clothes, or in 2006 writing articles about Barack Obama's middle name.) Despite professing to be left of center in his politics, Somerby also critiques liberals in the U.S. mainstream media who he feels do poor journalism, such as Rachel Maddow and Keith Olbermann, both of MSNBC.

The Daily Howler critiques education writing, often by analyzing badly reported data on scholastic achievement in low income or minority populations. For example, Somerby dissected a 2005 PBS "feel good" documentary Making Schools Work that touted the achievements in a low-income school district. Somerby showed that the showcased test score gains were neither remarkable (they were similar to average statewide score increases) nor indicative of large achievement (as evidenced by NAEP national tests). On the other hand, journalist Robert Samuelson supported a claim that public schools have made minimal progress since 1970 by using aggregated and cherry-picked NAEP statistics. Somerby showed that Samuelson had hid the spectacular multiple grade-level increases in the achievement levels of African American students. Similarly, a Washington Post article turned Maryland's twelfth-in-the-nation average eighth-grade math score into "last among the 50 states" by looking at differences rather than absolute numbers. Among other frequent education themes, Somerby criticizes reporting on Teach For America and what he calls "high-minded" punditry.

In January 2010, Somerby started a companion blog How He Got There where he is posting a book on the 2000 U.S. presidential election piece-by-piece as he writes it.

Bob Somerby is also a professional stand-up comic. He has appeared on Larry King Live, with Bill Maher, Bill O'Reilly and with Brian Lamb on C-SPAN. In college at Harvard, he was roommates with the actor Tommy Lee Jones and former Vice President Al Gore. After college he taught for twelve years in Baltimore public elementary schools.

== Commentary ==
- From a Columbia Journalism Review article: Bob Somerby needs no introduction, of course, unless your days are spent solely in the brick-and-mortar world...
- Paul Krugman opened one of his op-eds for The New York Times as follows:

A message to my fellow journalists: check out media watch sites like campaigndesk.org, mediamatters.org and dailyhowler.com. It's good to see ourselves as others see us. I've been finding The Daily Howler's concept of a media "script", a story line that shapes coverage, often in the teeth of the evidence, particularly helpful in understanding cable news.

- From a Virginian-Pilot editorial writer: ...his persistent needling made something of a splash in state education circles last week. ... What he’s discovered about the way Virginia calculates school accreditation ratings ought to be far more broadly understood.
