= Nancy Rubin =

American diplomat

Nancy H. Rubin served as U.S. Ambassador to the United Nations Commission on Human Rights and as a Presidential Appointee to the White House Council for Community Solutions. She was the 1st chair of the National Mental Health Awareness Campaign and is an advocate for mental health services. She currently serves as Vice Chair of The Didi Hirsch Mental Health Services, and the preeminent Didi Hirsch Suicide Prevention Center, and the UCLA Depression Grand Challenge Leadership Council. She serves on the Board of Advisors of the Ronald Reagan UCLA Medical Center, and the Cedars-Sinai International Board of Counselors. She is a Commissioner of the Commission on the Status of Women, Civil Human Rights and Equity LA. She is a member of the IWF Trusteeship. Rubin serves on the boards of the National Democratic Institute, Pacific Council, and Women for Women International. Rubin served on the United Nations Association Strategy Committee and Human Rights Task Force. She has served in the administrations of three Presidents. Rubin served as a board member of OEF International and chaired the Committee on Women and Law and Development, which began legal literacy projects in Asia, Africa, and Latin America. Rubin is known for her advocacy of social innovation to support communities and democratic institutions around the world, and for her work with government, the United Nations and NGOs. She is a member of the Council on Foreign Relations.

== Domestic community building and social justice ==
She was a Presidential Appointee to the White House Council for Community Solutions and was an Advisory Board Member of the Aspen Institute Forum for Community Solutions to advance change for cities’ most urgent needs. She has served at the White House Corporation for National and Community Service, and was part of the team that created AmeriCorps, which has engaged over half a million young Americans in public service programs. She was a director of The Washington Center, training university students in leadership and public service. In 1987, Rubin helped to create the LRAP program at Stanford University Law School, a first of-its-kind loan program for law students to pursue careers in public service and social justice. She was the first chair of the National Mental Health Awareness Campaign, an effort to eliminate barriers and stigma around mental illness, and has also served on the board of the Didi Hirsch Community Mental Health Centers.

== International human rights and women’s rights ==
Rubin was confirmed by the Senate as Ambassador, and from 1997 through 2000, she served as U.S. Representative to the United Nations Commission for Human Rights, now known as the United Nations Human Rights Council. She was a board member of the United Nations Association of the United States and she chaired Adopt-A-Minefield. Rubin was a U.S. participant at the 1985 and 1995 World Conferences on the Status of Women and the 1993 UN Economic and Social Council in Vienna. She is on the Advisory Council of UNIFEM. In addition, she serves on the Advisory committee of the UN Women US National Committee.

Rubin was a director of IHRG, now called Global Rights. She served on the Leadership Council for Amnesty International and co-chaired the organization's 50th Anniversary Year of Activities to expand the scope of human rights protection worldwide. She chaired the Coalition for Women in International Development (WID), and is a Commissioner of the Women's Refugee Commission. Beginning in the early 1980s, Rubin worked to advance women's equal access to resources during her tenure in each administration, the UN and as a member of several boards, including the Women's Leadership Board at Harvard's Kennedy School of Government.

She served on the Brookings Expert Committee on UN Human Rights Mechanisms and has worked for passage of the Convention to End Discrimination Against Women (CEDAW).

== Speeches and publications ==
Rubin has been invited as a guest speaker to several universities, military institutions, and public affairs events. She has appeared on the Charlie Rose Show. She has written articles for publications including The International Herald Tribune.
