= 2008 Massachusetts Democratic presidential primary =

- February 5, 2008

Candidate	Hillary Clinton	Barack Obama
Home state	New York	Illinois
Delegate count	55	38
Popular vote	705,185	511,680
Percentage	56.01%	40.64%
- County results Clinton: 50–60% 60–70% Obama: 40–50% 50–60%

The 2008 Massachusetts Democratic presidential primary was held on Super Tuesday, February 5, 2008, and had a total of 93 delegates at stake. The winner in each of Massachusetts's 10 congressional districts was awarded all of that district's delegates, totaling 61. Another 32 delegates were awarded to the statewide winner, Hillary Clinton. The 93 delegates represented Massachusetts at the Democratic National Convention in Denver, Colorado. Twenty-six other unpledged delegates, known as superdelegates, also attended the convention and cast their votes as well. Hillary Clinton won, despite Obama receiving endorsements from both senators, Ted Kennedy and John Kerry, and Governor Deval Patrick.

== Polls ==
Polls indicated that Hillary Clinton was leading Barack Obama in the days leading up to the contest in Massachusetts. Clinton won every pre-election poll except one, and of those she won, Clinton won all but one of them by double digits.

== Results ==
2008 Massachusetts Democratic presidential primary results
Party	Candidate	Votes	Percentage	Delegates
Democratic	Hillary Clinton	705,185	56.01%	55
Democratic	Barack Obama	511,680	40.64%	38
Democratic	John Edwards	20,101	1.60%	0
Democratic	Uncommitted	8,041	0.64%	0
Democratic	Write-ins	3,279	0.26%	0
Democratic	Joe Biden	3,216	0.26%	0
Democratic	Dennis Kucinich	2,992	0.24%	0
Democratic	Bill Richardson	1,846	0.15%	0
Democratic	Mike Gravel	1,463	0.12%	0
Democratic	Christopher Dodd	1,120	0.09%	0
Totals		1,258,923	100.00%	93
Voter turnout		%		—

2008 Democratic presidential primary in Massachusetts, mapped by municipality

== Analysis ==
Hillary Clinton won a convincing victory in Massachusetts over Barack Obama due to a number of factors. According to exit polls, 85 percent of voters in the Massachusetts Democratic primary were Caucasians, and they opted for Clinton by a margin of 58-40 percent compared to the 6 percent of African American voters who backed Obama by a margin of 66-29. Hispanics/Latinos, who comprised 5 percent of the total voters, backed Clinton by a margin of 56-36 percent. Clinton narrowly won the youth vote (those ages 18–29) by a margin of 49-48 and tied the vote among voters ages 30–44; she also won all voters over the age of 45 by a margin of 60.5-38. Pertaining to socioeconomic class, Clinton won all levels of family income except highly affluent voters making $200,000 or more a year, as they backed Obama by a narrow margin of 53-47 percent. As for educational attainment levels, Clinton won all categories except those with postgraduate degrees, who backed Obama by a margin of 51-47 percent. Self-identified Democrats in the primary, who made up 65 percent of the total electorate, voted for Clinton by a 58-41 margin, while Independents, who comprised a healthy 33 percent of the electorate, also voted for Clinton by a 54-42 margin. She won all ideological groups. Clinton also won all major religious denominations – Protestants 53-46; Roman Catholics 64-33; other Christians 51-47; and other religions 49-46. Obama won Jews by a margin of 52-48 as well as atheists/agnostics by a margin of 53-45.

Clinton performed extremely well statewide, carrying a majority of counties and sweeping most of the major urban areas and cities. Obama won Boston by fewer than 10,000 votes, while Clinton won other urban and conservative towns such as Springfield and Worcester.

Obama had picked up major endorsements from the Massachusetts Democratic establishment prior to Super Tuesday. Both U.S. Senators Ted Kennedy and John Kerry threw their support behind Obama, along with Governor Deval Patrick. Clinton also picked up a number of top-tier endorsements, including Mayor Thomas Menino of Boston and Speaker of the Massachusetts House of Representatives Salvatore DiMasi, along with U.S. Representatives Richard Neal and Barney Frank, one of the three openly gay members of the U.S. Congress.

== See also ==
- 2008 Democratic Party presidential primaries
- 2008 Massachusetts Republican presidential primary
