= Danella Lucioni =

Italian actress and model (born 1984)

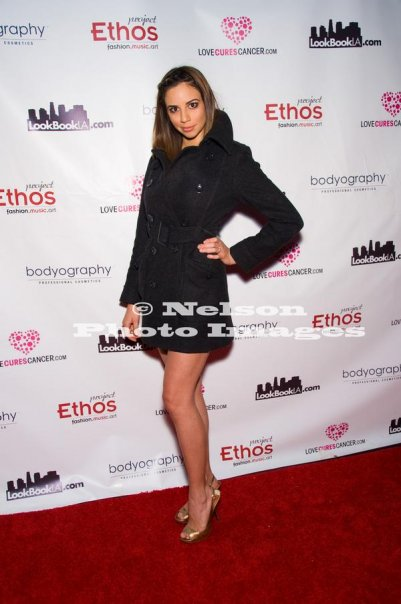
- Lucioni at red carpet event in Los Angeles, California
- Born: June 21, 1984 (age 42); Arequipa, Peru
- Modeling information
- Height: 5 ft 9 in (1.75 m)
- Hair color: Brown
- Eye color: Brown
- Agency: Manager: Gordon Rael. Agency: Otto Models in Los Angeles, California.
- Website: justdanella.com

Danella Lucioni (born June 21, 1984) is a Peruvian, American, and Italian model currently living in Florence, Italy.

== Early life ==
Born in Arequipa, Lucioni moved to South Pasadena, California with her family when she was 15 years old. She was scouted by several modeling agencies in her teens in Los Angeles and Italy, but wasn't interested in a fashion career until college, when she began modeling for friends in make-up school while studying for her bachelor's degree in advertising at California State University, Fullerton.

In 2006, she signed with UberWarning, which would dissolve the following year, and then Body Parts Models ("BPM") in 2007 and Otto Models in 2008. Her current manager is Gordon Rael.

== Career ==
=== Modeling ===
Lucioni has appeared in publications such as Seventeen, California Apparel News, Stuff, LA Times Magazine, Peru's COSAS and the cover of "Ellos&Ellas", 944, and Prequel, as well as print campaigns for CBGB, Ina Soltani, Sidaka Kaye, and among others including being featured in Lamborghini's 2009 calendar. In 2008 she shot with Paris Hilton for promotional material for Paris Hilton's My New BFF.

As a runway model, Lucioni has graced the catwalk in 2007, 2008, and 2009 Los Angeles Fashion Week shows for designers including Betsey Johnson, Nanette Lepore, Madison Marcus, Miguel Torres, ShaDang, Joyrich, Sidaka Kaye, Sterling Williams, David Tupaz, RYGY, Siboney Swimwear, and many other designers, as well for Fashion TV. Lucioni has also worked as a runway hair model several times for Wella, stylist Nick Arrojo, and Sebastian's The Doves.

Some of Lucioni's commercials include Mercedes-Benz for Italy, Lamborghini, and Oil of Olay for the US.

As a model, she made appearances in Launch my Line as the finale runway model, VH1's reality TV show The Shot (for photographers Jason Clevering and Dean Zulich) along with America's Next Top Model's model Sarah VonderHaar, and was interviewed by the entertainment network E! for their 12 Sexiest Hollywood Jobs special, in which her profession as a body parts model ranked #1.

=== Acting ===
Lucioni portrayed Gina in feature film Cathedral Canyon in 2013, starring alongside Winsor Harmon. She has also appeared in HBO's Entourage, TLC's Untold Stories of the ER, and TLC's Diagnosis X. She co-starred in indie band Go West Young Man's music video "The Covinas", and has also been in other music videos for the likes of Christina Aguilera, UK rock band Switches, and double-platinum singer from Spain, Huecco.

== Trivia ==
- In 2007, Lucioni went skydiving with The Golden Knights, the United States Army Parachute Team, in Arizona, and jumped along with Clint Eastwood's daughter Kimber Eastwood, Dwight Hicks (NFL's San Francisco 49ers Super Bowl two-time winner), and Pamela Bach (Baywatch actress and David Hasselhoff's ex-wife) and in 2008 for the second time, along with Dennis Haysbert, NFL's Drew Brees and Robert Patrick among other celebrities.
- As an animal rights supporter, Lucioni founded non-profit kitten organization, Athena Kittens.
