= Herbert London =

American activist and academic

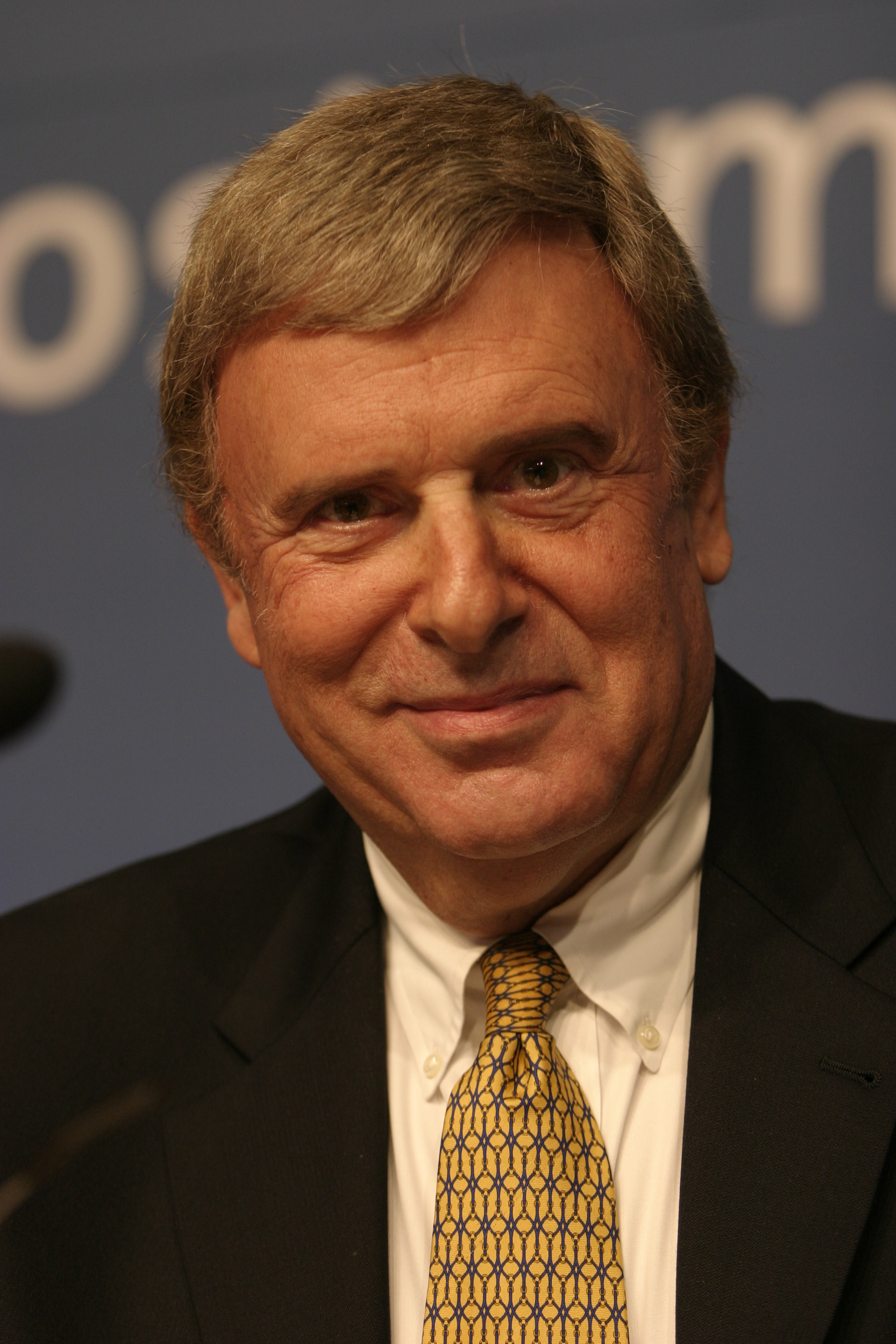
- London in 2006

President of the Hudson Institute
- In office 1997–2011
- Preceded by: Leslie Lenkowsky
- Succeeded by: Kenneth R. Weinstein

Personal details
- Born: Herbert Ira London; March 6, 1939 Brighton Beach, Brooklyn, New York, U.S.
- Died: November 10, 2018 (aged 79) Manhattan, New York, U.S.
- Party: Conservative; Republican
- Children: At least 3, including Stacy
- Education: Columbia University; New York University
- Occupation: Political activist, commentator, author, academic

Herbert Ira London (March 6, 1939 – November 10, 2018) was an American conservative activist, commentator, author, and academic. London was the president of the Hudson Institute from 1997 to 2011. He was a frequent columnist for The Washington Times. London was president of the London Center for Policy Research, a conservative think tank hosted at The King's College in New York City, and a member of the Council on Foreign Relations.

== Personal life and education ==
London was born on March 6, 1939, in Brighton Beach, Brooklyn, New York, the son of Esta (Epstein), a homemaker, and Jack London, who sold materials for upholstery. His family was Jewish. At 6'5", he played basketball for a city championship-winning Jamaica High School team.

London recorded several pop songs, achieving a modest hit record in 1959 with "Sorry We're Not Going Steady." One of his three daughters is Stacy London, former host of TV shows What Not to Wear and Love, Lust or Run.

London attended Columbia University and studied under Jacques Barzun. He graduated from Columbia in 1960 and obtained a doctorate in history at New York University in 1966.

London died in Manhattan from complications of heart failure on November 10, 2018, at the age of 79.

== Professional life ==
London started working at New York University after getting his doctorate there. He was responsible for creating NYU's "University Without Walls" in 1972. UWW was part of a new trend in American higher education to provide inter-disciplinary and out-of-the-classroom learning. UWW changed its name to the Gallatin Division in 1976. Gallatin students design their own curricula and do not have any required courses. Gallatin later added a focus on the study of great books. London directed the program from its inception until 1992. After retiring as a dean, London became the John M. Olin Professor of Humanities at NYU. The Gallatin Division was renamed the Gallatin School of Individualized Study in 1995.

London was the president of Hudson Institute from 1997 until 2011 and later was named president emeritus. He was also a senior fellow at the Center for the American University at the Manhattan Institute and chairman of the National Association of Scholars. In February 2013, London joined the board of advisors of the Coalition to Reduce Spending.

London was a noted social critic and a guest lecturer on many major radio and television programs, including CNN's Crossfire which he co-hosted for one year. His work appeared in major newspapers across the country, including the Wall Street Journal, Commentary, National Review, Fortune, The New York Times and many others.

In 2012, he founded the London Center for Policy Research, which was influential in the staffing and policy direction of the first Trump Administration, with many of its senior fellows taking on both official and unofficial roles in the administration.

== Political campaigns ==
London registered as a Republican in New York in 1978. He was considered a conservative maverick, at various times joining and at other times criticizing the New York State Republican Party.

=== 1989 campaign for Mayor of New York City ===
In 1989, London entered the race for both the Conservative Party and Republican Party nominations for Mayor of New York City. Ronald Lauder was endorsed by the Conservatives and London dropped out of the Republican primary.

=== 1990 campaign for Governor of New York ===
London was the Conservative Party nominee for Governor of New York in 1990. The party broke from recent practice and declined to cross-endorse the Republican nominee, the Canada-born businessman Pierre Rinfret. Conservatives leaders cited Rinfret's support for abortion, his perceived lack of seriousness about his candidacy, and his potential difficulties in attacking incumbent Democratic governor Mario Cuomo on fiscal policies as reasons for their decision to run their own gubernatorial candidate. London finished one percentage point behind Rinfret, 827,614 votes to 865,948. Cuomo was re-elected to a third term.

=== 1994 campaign for New York Comptroller ===
Soon after the 1990 election, London began campaigning for the Republican nomination in the 1994 Governor's race, which turned out to have no clear front-runner. The main reason was that U.S. Senator Al D'Amato kept hinting he would run for the nomination and if he did, he would be the presumptive favorite. London became the first formally announced candidate to take on incumbent Mario Cuomo, declaring for both the Republican and Conservative parties' nomination in October 1993.

Republican and Conservative leaders were resolved to support the same candidate to avoid splitting the conservative vote as in 1990. D'Amato preferred State Senator George Pataki, but state senate majority leader Ralph J. Marino held a grudge against Pataki, London and others who tried to oust Marino in the 1992 primary. However, Marino supported London through the Republican Party convention, where London could not gain enough supporters to automatically be placed on the G.O.P. primary ballot.

During that convention, Republican leaders convinced London to drop out of the governor's race in favor of accepting the party's nomination for state Comptroller. Prior to London being offered the Comptroller's nomination, Assemblyman John Faso was considered the frontrunner for the nomination. London went on to face interim Democratic Comptroller Carl McCall.

The race was notable in part for the controversy created when the candidates' identities—Jewish for London and black for McCall—became a focal point of the campaign. Then, in the week before the election, a statement was issued by 50 leading members of the Democratic Party in New York, condemning London for launching racist attacks against McCall. Two Manhattan Republicans withdrew their support for London, while Mayor Rudy Giuliani stuck with his endorsement of London.

McCall defeated London in the election, 52% to 46%, becoming the first black candidate elected to statewide office in New York. McCall had out-raised London $3.6 million to $543,000. London's criticism of Pataki and his attack ads against McCall were seen as negatively affecting his performance in the race.

== Works ==
- The BDS War Against Israel: The Orwellian Campaign to Destroy Israel Through the Boycott, Divestment and Sanctions Movement. CreateSpace Independent Publishing Platform. 2014. (with Jed Babbin)
- The Transformational Decade: Snapshots of a Decade from 9/11 to the Obama Presidency. University Press of America. 2012.
- Decline and Revival in Higher Education. Transaction Publishers. 2010.
- America's Secular Challenge: The Rise of a New National Religion. Encounter Books. 2008.
- Decade of Denial: A Snapshot of America in the 1990s. Lexington Books. 2001.
- The National Endowments: A Critical Symposium. Center for the Study of Popular Culture. 1995. (edited with James F. Cooper & Laurence Jarvik)
- From the Empire State to the Vampire State. University Press of America. 1994. (with Edwin S. Rubenstein)
- Armageddon in the Classroom. University Press of America. 1987.
- Why Are They Lying to Our Children? Stein and Day. 1984 (Foreword by Herman Kahn). ISBN 0-8128-2937-9
- Social Science Theory: Structure and Application. New York University Press. 1975. ISBN 9780814749586.
- Brian Griffin, ed. (2017). Leading From Behind: The Obama Doctrine and the U.S. Retreat From International Affairs. Liberty Island Media. ISBN 0692839216.

== Articles ==
- London, Herbert (February 17, 2015). "Continuing our Iran policy: A mistake then, a mistake now". The Hill.
- London, Herbert (July 27, 2014). "Don't Dismiss California School System's Fights Over Israel Divestment". Algemeiner.

Party political offices
Preceded by Andrew O'Rourke	Conservative Nominee for Governor of New York; 1990	Succeeded by George Pataki
Preceded by Edward Regan	Republican and Conservative Nominee for New York State Comptroller; 1994	Succeeded by Bruce Blakeman
