= Shoemaker High School =

Location
- 3302 South Clear Creek Road; Killeen, Bell County, Texas 76549-4113; United States; 31.10211°N 97.79645°W

Information
- School type: Public, high school
- Opened: 2000
- Locale: City: Midsize
- School district: Killeen ISD
- NCES School ID: 482566008696
- Principal: Mary Lynn Gawryszenwski
- Faculty: 123.58 (on an FTE basis)
- Grades: 9–12
- Enrollment: 2,258 (2023–2024)
- Student to teacher ratio: 18.27
- Colors: Navy Blue and Silver
- Athletics conference: UIL Class AAAAAA
- Nickname: Grey Wolves
- Website: www.killeenisd.org/o/shoemakerhs

Robert M. Shoemaker High School is a public high school located in Killeen, Texas and classified as a 6A school by the University Interscholastic League. Formerly the Ellison 9th Grade Center, Robert M. Shoemaker is one of six high schools in the Killeen Independent School District located in western Bell County. During 2023–2024, Shoemaker High School had an enrollment of 2,258 students and a student to teacher ratio of 18.27. The school received an overall rating of "C" from the Texas Education Agency for the 2024–2025 school year.

== History ==
2001 was the inaugural year for the high school, graduating students who primarily transferred from C.E. Ellison.

== Athletics ==
The Shoemaker Grey Wolves compete in the following sports -

- Baseball
- Basketball
- Cross Country
- Dancing
- Football
- Golf
- Soccer
- Softball
- Swimming
- Tennis
- Track and Field
- Volleyball
- Wrestling

== Notable alumni ==
- Julian "Ryan" Brownpile (2025), Israeli carrom player
- Roy Miller (2005), American football player
- Eugene Daniels (2007), journalist
- Shatonna J. Nelson (2007), Crisis, celebrity and political strategist
- Jameill Showers (2010), American football player
- Brother Nature (Kelvin Peña) (2016), social media influencer
- J'Wan Roberts (2019), basketball player
- Monaray Baldwin (2021), American football player
- Omari Evans (2022), American football player
