= Snog Marry Avoid? =

British television series

- Written by: Doug Faulkner
- Presented by: Jenny Frost (2008–11); Ellie Taylor (2012–13)
- Country of origin: United Kingdom
- Original language: English
- No. of series: 6
- No. of episodes: 64

Production
- Running time: 30 minutes
- Production company: Remarkable Television

Original release
- Network: BBC Three
- Release: 23 June 2008 – 9 December 2013

Snog Marry Avoid? is a British reality television series broadcast on BBC Three, produced by Remarkable Television. The first four series were presented by Atomic Kitten member Jenny Frost, with Ellie Taylor presenting from the fifth series onwards. The show focused mainly on transforming 'fakery obsessed' or 'slap addicts' in Britain into 'natural beauties' by stripping them of their "skimpy" clothes and layers of make-up and giving them a 'makeunder' instead of a makeover with the help of POD – the Personal Overhaul Device. The POD's commentary is created by comedian Doug Faulkner and is voiced by the series 1–3 producer.

The show ended after its sixth series, which was broadcast in 2013.

== Overview ==
Snog Marry Avoid? has given 'makeunders' to a range of people in Britain, including celebrities.

Within the world of the programme, POD is a computer that "only understands natural beauty". It conducts a public analysis to ask the public whether they would snog, marry, or avoid the participant, as well as another random question, which offers those questioned another chance to praise or criticise. After the questions, it allows the person to choose their style based on a celebrity, and to dress them accordingly. It sometimes orders the person to do a 'deep cleanse', where they have to take off all of their make-up. After the transformation, POD will ask the public what they think of the person. The person is then re-introduced to their partner or relative outside the TV studio and their reaction is recorded, generally a positive one towards the more natural look.

Later on in the show, the presenter (Jenny Frost in series 1–4) meets with the person to see if they have kept their look and discusses the transformation. In series 5, with new host Ellie Taylor, the show visits towns and cities nationwide on the first ever Snog Marry Avoid? roadshow (e.g. Birmingham, Liverpool, Sheffield, Cardiff, Manchester, Sunderland, Newcastle upon Tyne, Nottingham, Portsmouth, Belfast, London or Glasgow). Also changed in this series, the person's new style is no longer based on a celebrity – it is now solely POD's creation. In series 6, a catwalk was also introduced, whereby the person shows off their look to their friends, family and other locals.

As with many BBC programmes, previews are uploaded to YouTube before the programme is screened on TV. One of the most viewed Snog Marry Avoid? videos on YouTube is Scotland's No1 Male Barbie, which got interest around the world due to celebrity blogger Perez Hilton featuring it on his Twitter page. The most viewed video is the makeunder of Chloe Victoria Mafia, who is also known for auditioning for the seventh series of The X Factor.

== Episodes ==
=== Series 1 ===
- Episode 1 – Fake-tan obsessed Levi from Kent and glamour model wannabe Tamsin undergo a change. First broadcast: 23 June 2008
- Episode 2 – Features a Jodie Marsh wannabe and a married couple addicted to piercings. First broadcast: 30 June 2008
- Episode 3 – With corset lover Dominique, pole dance instructor Jules and boyband Girls That Scream. First broadcast: 7 July 2008
- Episode 4 – Features hair ruined by extensions, a blonde corset lover and a fake-tan addict. First broadcast: 14 July 2008
- Episode 5 – Features a glitter-lover, a girl who hairsprays her make-up in place and a punk. First broadcast: 21 July 2008
- Episode 6 – Features busty Chelsea and 17-year-old Josh, who wears bean cans instead of jewellery. First broadcast: 28 July 2008

=== Series 2 ===
- Episode 1 – Flesh-flashing Londoner Mykela, metal-mad Mark and Chantelle Houghton face POD. First broadcast: 16 February 2009
- Episode 2 – Featuring high-maintenance Hannah and Jodie Marsh obsessive Heather from Series 1. First broadcast: 23 February 2009
- Episode 3 – With Italian makeup addict Martha, Aisleyne Horgan-Wallace, burlesque babes Lou La La and Miss Loula Cherry. First broadcast: 2 March 2009
- Episode 4 – Blonde Danielle, gothic geisha Azelie and outrageous mother Jay face the wrath of POD. First broadcast: 9 March 2009
- Episode 5 – POD and Jenny get to grips with the Cheeky Girls and wannabe actresses the Howe twins. First broadcast: 16 March 2009
- Episode 6 – POD and Jenny Frost transform a Playboy Bunny wannabe and a Capt Jack Sparrow look-alike. First broadcast: 23 March 2009
- Episode 7 – POD and Jenny Frost transform disco dancing Paige and mosh-pit Barbie Lara. First broadcast: 30 March 2009
- Episode 8 – POD and Jenny meet cosmetics-crazy Nikki from Leeds, and pink-obsessed Louise. First broadcast: 6 April 2009
- Episode 9 – POD strips Vicky of her precious false eyelashes and meets military cyber-goth Ebony. First broadcast: 20 April 2009
- Episode 10 – POD and Jenny meet party girl Kelsey, buxom blonde model Dani T and Collagen Girl. First broadcast: 27 April 2009
- Episode 11 – POD and Jenny meet model Emma B, ultraviolet raver Keiran and a group of dancehall divas. First broadcast: 4 May 2009
- Episode 12 – POD and Jenny meet glam Nikki from Liverpool and a pouting princess called Lady Desalina. First broadcast: 11 May 2009

=== Series 3 ===
To promote the third series, BBC Three aired a one-off special called Snog, Marry, Avoid – Top 10 Shockers, a countdown of the most memorable make-unders on 15 December 2009. Series 3 kicked off on 4 February 2010, with a 12-episode series.

- Episode 1 – Chloe and Kate
- Episode 2 – Jess and Petagay
- Episode 3 – Alannah and Clinton
- Episode 4 – Bianca Gascoigne and Andre J.
- Episode 5 – Carolyn and Sherika; Goldie Lookin Chain
- Episode 6 – Princess Lolly enters POD
- Episode 7 – Harriet, Bonnie and Lhouraii
- Episode 8 – Leigh-Ann and Hollie
- Episode 9 – Big Brother 10 winner Sophie Reade, Siobhan/Biohazard, and The X Factor contestants Kandy Rain
- Episode 10 – Big Brother 9 contestants Lisa and Mario, Villa Kula and Poppy Moon.
- Episode 11 – Lucy Rox, Tommy and Charlie Doherty.
- Episode 12 – Rebecca, Angel-Rose and Lucy

=== Series 4 ===
Series 4 began on 11 January 2011 at 8pm. There were 12 episodes and it ended on 15 March 2011.

- Episode 1 – The Royal Special – Lady Victoria Hervey
- Episode 2 – The Twins and Emily Kerr
- Episode 3 – Rockstar Spud and Chantelle Louise
- Episode 4 – Participant was a minor and Hollie Wilkinson
- Episode 5 – Lissy Summers and Abbie Goodwin
- Episode 6 – Family Special – Rooneys and Wanda & Trisha
- Episode 7 – Allyson and Verena
- Episode 8 – POD tries to get the boys from Dirty Sanchez to clean up their act.
- Episode 9 – POD meets a drag artist who wants to be Coco Chanel, but is more like Coco the Clown.
- Episode 10 – POD meets a six-foot glamazon with outsized assets, a geisha with a guitar and a DJ with a penchant for mushrooms.
- Episode 11 – Look-alikes Special – Lady Gaga lookalike Cat Winter becomes less Gaga.
- Episode 12 – Lynne C & Emma C

=== Series 5 ===
With new host Ellie Taylor, series 5 commenced on 14 May 2012, at 10.30pm on BBC Three. There were 10 episodes and it ended on 16 July 2012.

- Episode 1 – Kelly & Bam Bo Tang
- Episode 2 – Olivia and Kate
- Episode 3 – Adrienne and Lottie Lou
- Episode 4 – Karina and Dan
- Episode 5 – Lacy Cakes and Charlene
- Episode 6 – Kiya and Adele
- Episode 7 – Shelly and Olivia Dean
- Episode 8 – Hannah and Tomasz (Tomasz is also the winner of an episode of Total Wipeout)
- Episode 9 – Tessa, Nina and Ryan
- Episode 10 – Rachel and Holly

=== Series 6 ===
Series 6 began on 18 March 2013, airing every Monday at 10:00pm. There were 12 episodes.

- Episode 1 – POD and Ellie meet Lady Gaga-obsessed Ellie, and Vicky is sure there is no natural beauty under her fake tan. And Ellie gets all dolled up as she goes around Essex. First broadcast: 18 March 2013.
- Episode 2 – POD and Ellie meet OTT Jazmine, and Cybergoth Cara who calls herself 'a multi-coloured mental monster'. And Ellie runs around Birmingham after transforming herself into an emo. First broadcast: 25 March 2013.
- Episode 3 – POD and Ellie meet Jasmine who loves her huge eyebrows, and Vicky whose plight for plastic fantastic perfection is driving her father up the wall. And Ellie gets into a disco style as she tries to understand the fashion love behind disco pants whilst she goes around Cardiff. First broadcast: 1 April 2013.
- Episode 4 – POD and Ellie meet punk Mel, who scares people away with her tattoos, piercings and mohawk, and ghetto-fabulous Luke, whose bling is so minging that POD's sensors go into overdrive. Also, Ellie goes round Liverpool in the latest fashion – a onesie. First broadcast: 8 April 2013.
- Episode 5 – POD and Ellie meet Jo who has always known she is a girl trapped inside a boy's body and Kristie who is obsessed with looking 'Dead'. Meanwhile, in Nottingham Ellie man ups in order to get to the bottom of why men walk around with their trousers halfway down their backsides. First broadcast: 15 April 2013.
- Episode 6 – POD and Ellie meet Liberty, who loves to be judged by others, and glamour girl Sophie who dresses like a doll. And Ellie becomes an Essex girl and goes out to meet the public. First broadcast: 22 April 2013.
- Episode 7 – POD and Ellie meet Sophie, who is obsessed with hair extensions, and Danny GoGo, who has bright pink hair and skin so orange that he looks like a troll, and can't understand why he can't get a boyfriend. Also, Ellie goes around Birmingham learning about the "Brum Bum". First broadcast: 29 April 2013.
- Episode 8 – POD and Ellie meet Jessica, who is making a right exhibition of herself with her Gyaru style 'I'm a piece of art – but abstract', and Meleisha, who goes clubbing in her underwear and whose hair is so bright it stops traffic. First broadcast: 6 May 2013.
- Episode 9 – POD and Ellie meet Laura, who loves everything pink and Natasha who is obsessed with the pinup look. Meanwhile, Ellie tries the Vintage look. Ellie explains her disappointment that Laura hated her makeunder and said it was the biggest failure Snog Marry Avoid ever had. First broadcast: 13 May 2013.
- Episode 10 – POD and Ellie meet Joanna and Claire. First broadcast: 20 May 2013.
- Episode 11 – POD and Ellie meet fake-tan enthusiast Jake and makeup addict Whitney. First broadcast: 27 May 2013.
- Episode 12 – POD and Ellie meet Jason Kempson who is as brown as a Christmas pudding, but insists that 'any attention is good attention' and Verity, whose outfits are always incredibly short and leave nothing to imagination as she explains "Everyone gets their baubles out at Christmas". Meanwhile, Ellie puckers up with festive bejewelled lips and wanders around Essex trying to get a smooch under the mistletoe.

== Ratings ==
Snog Marry Avoid? has received positive reviews, complimenting its useful beauty tips and 'cliche' gimmick. BBC Three's boss has declared it a "roaring success". Australian rapper Iggy Azalea has said that she is a fan of the show, admitting "It's very interesting TV".

Viewership had climbed throughout the first two series, on average over 750,000 people tuning into each of the second series' episodes. Repeats also gained good ratings, becoming one of BBC Three's top shows.

== Repeats ==
Local TV channel London Live repeatedly aired all 6 series of the programme from the Jenny Frost and Ellie Taylor eras and was previously shown on BBC Three.

Reruns of the show were also broadcast on VH1.

== Transmissions ==
Series	Start date	End date	Episodes
1	23 June 2008	28 July 2008	6
2	16 February 2009	11 May 2009	12
3	4 February 2010	1 April 2010	12
4	11 January 2011	15 March 2011	12
5	14 May 2012	16 July 2012	10
6	18 March 2013	9 December 2013	12

== International format ==
A German version started airing in November 2008 on the commercial channel ProSieben. "Love Date or Hate –die ehrlichste Starstyle-Rubrik der Welt" (Love Date or Hate – the most honest starstyle-column in the world) was a part of the weekly showbiz-oriented television programme "red! – Stars, Lifestyle & More", but due to harsh criticism the column was taken off the show after a few months. POD was called Stylomat in this TV format (portmanteau of the words style and automat).

A Russian version named Косметический ремонт [Kosmeticheskiĭ remont] (Redecorating) has aired since 23 May 2011 on musical and entertainment channel Muz-TV. It is presented by the Russian theatre and television actress, Aleksandra Rebenok.

In Italy, the original British version is aired (dubbed in Italian language) on Real Time with the title Dire, Fare, Baciare from April 2013. The Italian version Dire, Fare, Baciare Italia started airing in February 2014 presented by Carla Gozzi.

A similar American version on TLC, presented by Stacy London, is called Love, Lust or Run.

A Dutch version on RTL 5 is called Lust, Liefde of Laten Lopen.
