= Stacy London =

Television host and author from the United States

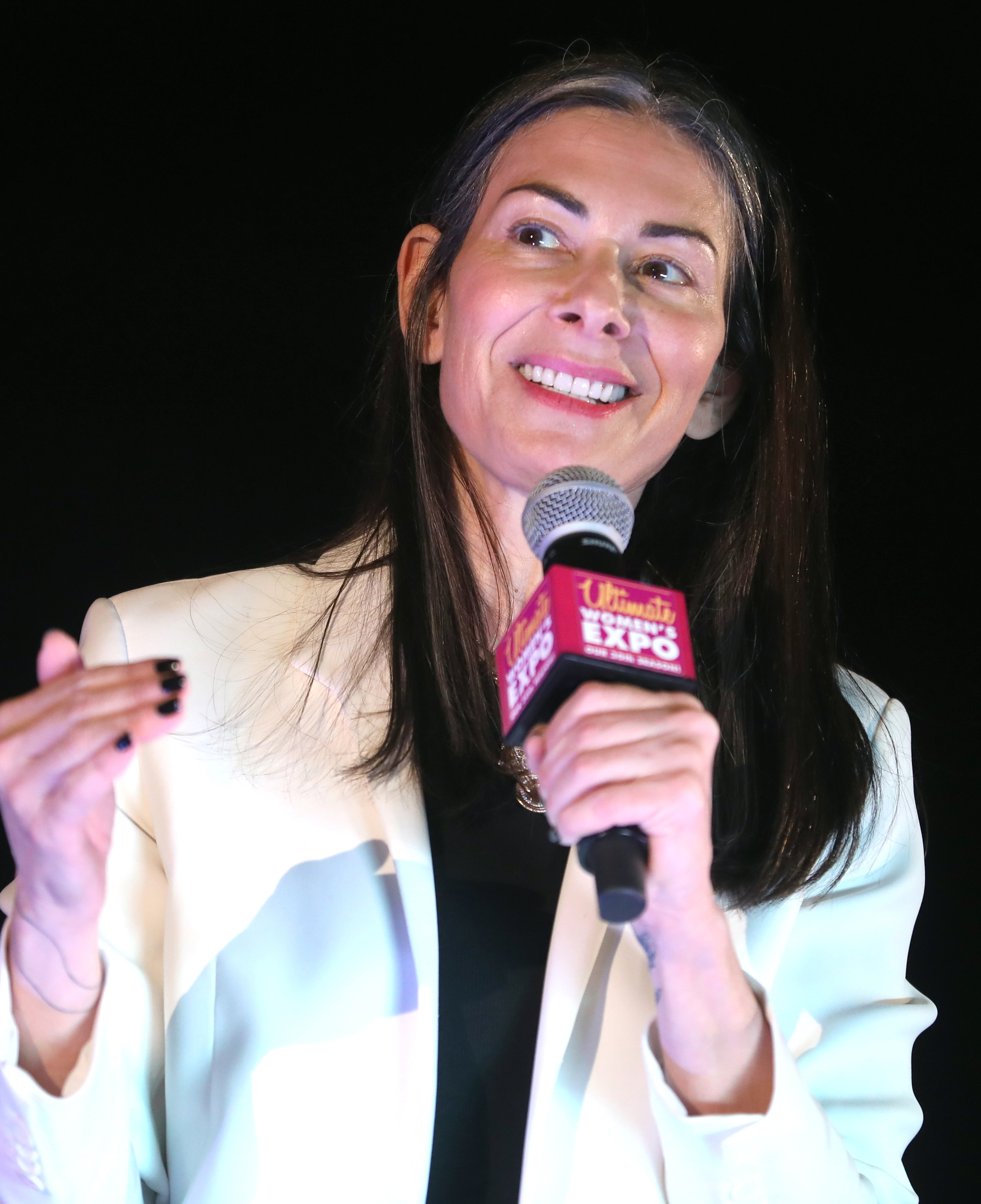
- London in 2023
- Born: May 25, 1969 (age 57); New York City, U.S.
- Education: Vassar College
- Occupations: TV Personality, Designer, Stylist, Author, Midlife Advocate
- Years active: 1993–present
- Relatives: Herbert London (father) Joy Weinman (mother)

Stacy London (born May 25, 1969) is an American stylist, TV personality, author, and midlife advocate. She is best known as the co-host of the iconic TLC show What Not to Wear.

After graduating from Vassar College, London began her career at Vogue as a fashion assistant and later editor. She went on to style celebrities, designers, and editorial campaigns before transitioning into television. She became co-host of What Not to Wear, first with Wayne Scot Lukas and later with Clinton Kelly. She also appeared as a fashion correspondent on Access Hollywood, The Early Show, the Today Show, and was a regular guest on The Oprah Winfrey Show, The View, and Rachael Ray for many years.

London has served as a spokesperson for brands including Pantene, Dr. Scholl’s, Lee Jeans, and Woolite. Her book "The Truth About Style" became a New York Times bestseller.

She later co-founded State of Menopause, a brand addressing the physical and emotional challenges of menopause. She is an advisor to Evernow, a telehealth and menopause treatment platform, and Flow Health, a media platform for women’s health. She is on the Board of Directors for two non-profit organizations, Chronicon Foundation and Glam4Good. Her experience in the women’s health space propelled her back to fashion to help people in mid-life find a new sense of self-esteem and power in aging.

In 2025, Amazon announced her return to television with Clinton Kelly in Wear Whatever The F You Want. She currently has a fashion brand exclusive to QVC.

== Early life ==
London was born in New York City on May 25, 1969. She is of Sicilian descent on her mother's side and Jewish descent on her father's side. Her mother, Joy Weinman, worked as a venture capitalist, and her father, Herbert London, was the president emeritus of the Hudson Institute. Her stepmother, Vicki Pops, is a romance novelist. In an interview with The Wall Street Journal, she said of her father, "We don't see eye to eye on that much politically [but] he did instill a certain sense of propriety and right and wrong in me, which plays into my fashion sensibility." While going to Vassar College, she double majored in 20th-century philosophy and German literature and was a member of Phi Beta Kappa. It was during a summer internship in Paris in Christian Dior's PR department that she took a serious interest in pursuing a career in the fashion industry.

== Career ==
London began her career as a fashion assistant at Vogue magazine and later became the senior fashion editor at Mademoiselle. She has styled fashion photos for other publications, including Italian D, Nylon, and Contents. London has styled for celebrities such as Kate Winslet and Liv Tyler, and on fashion shows for designers Rebecca Taylor, Ghost, and Vivienne Tam. London has worked on numerous advertising campaigns; her client roster includes Hanes, Wonderbra, Bali, Procter & Gamble, CoverGirl, Suave, Target, Levi Strauss & Co., Maytag, Swatch, Longines, and Calvin Klein.

London began co-hosting TLC's What Not to Wear in its inaugural season in 2003. In 2005, she and co-host Clinton Kelly wrote a book titled Dress Your Best. London is known for her love of high-heeled shoes, owning over 300 pairs. In a What Not to Wear "Best of 2005" look-back show, Clinton Kelly teased London by saying "...there are almost as many great moments as there are high heels in Stacy's wardrobe." In 2008, London also served as the host of her own talk show Shut Up! It's Stacy London! which was the pilot episode for Fashionably Late with Stacy London. London has done fashion reporting for Weekend Today, The Early Show, Good Day Live, and Access Hollywood. She is a frequent contributor on NBC's Today Show.

From 2009 to 2010, London was a spokesperson for Pantene, Woolite, Dr. Scholl's, and Riders by Lee. In addition to her hosting duties and endorsements, London and business partner Cindy McLaughlin co-founded Style for Hire—an online service that matches people with personal stylists that live in their area. The goal of the online agency is to bring personal styling services to average income people. Style for Hire was launched as a pilot on September 13, 2010, in Washington, D.C., to test the idea. The agency launched in its entirety on April 16, 2012. As of that date, there are 135 stylists in 24 cities. London is also the creative director for Westfield Style and the editor-in-chief of Westfield STYLE magazine. Westfield's Style Lounges are staffed by professional stylists from Style for Hire who provide free on-demand fashion consultations. There are three Style Lounges located at Westfield Garden State Plaza in New Jersey, Westfield Montgomery in Maryland, and Westfield Trumbull in Connecticut.

London was the executive producer of Big Brooklyn Style, a reality show about customer experiences at Lee Lee's Valise boutique in New York. The show premiered May 29, 2012 on TLC. In February 2013, she became an editor-at-large of Shape magazine. In her role, she was to write a fashion column for the magazine every month. In March 2013, TLC announced that What Not to Wear would air its final season starting in July. London said of the experience "This show changed me and the trajectory of my life... I hope we touched [our contributors] as much as they touched me. I hope we touched our viewers." In January 2015, TLC announced that London would host Love, Lust, or Run, a show similar to her previous work, What Not to Wear. She was an official contributor on Season 19 of The View from 2015 to 2016.

== Personal life ==
London lives in the Carroll Gardens neighborhood of New York City's Brooklyn borough. On December 31, 2019, she announced that she was in her first serious relationship with a woman. In 2024, she specified that she is a lesbian.

London has suffered from psoriasis since childhood. Due to her experience growing up, she became a spokesperson for the National Psoriasis Foundation in 2007 and AbbVie's "Uncover Your Confidence" campaign in 2013. She is well known for her naturally occurring gray streak in the front of her hair—known in the medical field as poliosis—which she has had since she was 11 years old. Her Pantene contract includes a "gray clause" that allows her to keep it.

In the early 1990s, London struggled with anorexia, binge eating, and other weight issues. Standing 5 feet 7 inches (170 cm), she was 90 pounds (41 kg) at her lightest weight and 180 pounds (82 kg) at her heaviest. In a 2007 interview with Sirens magazine, she said of the experience, "I have been every size in my life. I've been smaller than a zero, up through a size 16. I've had lots of issues with body image and weight my whole life and it really took a great deal of work to recognize that at all those weights, no matter how I felt, I could still find a dress that made me feel sexy and powerful."

In 2010, London was profiled by Time Out magazine in their article/photo series about the most stylish New Yorkers. That same year, she performed in the Off-Broadway play Love, Loss, and What I Wore, a series of monologues about women's clothes and their relationship to life events/memories. London has not gotten married nor had children. She discussed being single, the importance of personal style, and her past struggles with eating disorders in her second book, a memoir, titled The Truth About Style.

In December 2016, London underwent spinal fusion surgery to correct a chronic back problem, which required a six-month rehabilitation.
