= Ellison High School =

Location
- 909 Elms Road; Killeen, Bell County, Texas 76542-2699; United States; 31.0838°N 97.7387°W

Information
- School type: Public, high school
- Established: 1978
- Locale: City: Midsize
- School district: Killeen ISD
- NCES School ID: 482566002866
- Principal: David Dominguez
- Faculty: 101.44 (on an FTE basis)
- Grades: 9–12
- Enrollment: 1,687 (2023–2024)
- Student to teacher ratio: 16.63
- Colors: Green and White
- Athletics: UIL Class AAAAA
- Team name: Eagles
- Yearbook: Free Spirit
- Website: www.killeenisd.org/o/ehs

C. E. Ellison High School is a public high school in the city of Killeen, Bell County, Texas. It is one of six high schools in the Killeen Independent School District, and during 2024–2026 is classified as a 5A school by the University Interscholastic League. During 2023–2024, Ellison High School had an enrollment of 1,687 students and a student to teacher ratio of 16.63. The school received an overall rating of "B" from the Texas Education Agency for the 2024–2025 school year.

== Academics ==
=== Available AP Coursework ===
Currently, the following Advanced Placement (AP) exams are available to the students:

- Calculus AB
- Microeconomics
- English Language & Composition
- English Literature & Composition
- Government & Politics: U.S.
- Music Theory
- Physics B
- Psychology
- Spanish language
- U.S. History
- World History
- Chemistry
- Biology

== History ==
Ellison High School opened in 1978 and the first graduation class was held in 1979. The Ellison High School football program received a donation of $25,000 from the American television channel NBC and automobile maker Toyota, for their participation in the Friday Night Lights Hometown Sweepstakes contest. The former University of Kentucky head basketball coach, Billy Gillispie, was the head coach at Ellison in the early 1990s, leading the school to the 5A state basketball tournament in 1993.

== Notable alumni ==
- Amerie – R&B singer
- David Cobb – American football player, Tennessee Titans
- Perry Eliano - American football coach
- Ted Gibson – American hairstylist on TLC's What Not to Wear
- Tommie Harris – American football player for San Diego Chargers and Chicago Bears
- Othello Henderson – American football player for the New Orleans Saints
- Fred House – Basketball player for the National Basketball Development League and several different teams based in Europe
- Terry Ray – American and Canadian football player for the Atlanta Falcons, New England Patriots, Edmonton Eskimos, and Winnipeg Blue Bombers
- Donald Ray Sellers – American former football player, for the Scottish Claymores of NFL Europe
- Zack Wright – Professional basketball player for several different teams based in Europe
