= Don Hardeman =

American football player (1952–2016)

No. 30, 36, 38
- Position: Running back

Personal information
- Born: August 13, 1952; Killeen, Texas, U.S.
- Died: June 2, 2016 (aged 63); Temple, Texas, U.S.
- Listed height: 6 ft 2 in (1.88 m)
- Listed weight: 235 lb (107 kg)

Career information
- High school: Killeen (TX)
- College: Texas A&M–Kingsville
- NFL draft: 1975: 1st round, 15th overall pick

Career history
- Houston Oilers (1975–1977); Baltimore Colts (1978–1979); Denver Broncos (1980)*
- * Offseason or practice squad member only

Awards and highlights
- PFWA All-Rookie Team (1975)

Career NFL statistics
- Rushing attempts-yards: 397-1460
- Receptions-yards: 58-285
- Touchdowns: 13
- Stats at Pro Football Reference

Donald Ray Hardeman (August 13, 1952 – June 2, 2016) was an American professional football player who was a running back in the National Football League (NFL). He has 5 sons, Don Hardeman Jr. (Hou), Eric Hardeman (Hou), Cedric Hardeman (Hou), Demetrius Hardeman (DC) and David Hardeman (NY).

Hardeman played five seasons with the Houston Oilers and the Baltimore Colts. In his short career, he scored eleven rushing touchdowns and caught two more. He rushed for 1,460 yards on 397 attempts and caught 58 passes for 285 yards. He was selected in the first round of the 1975 NFL draft by the Oilers and attended Texas A&I University. He attended Killeen High School in Killeen, Texas. He died in Temple, Texas in 2016.
