= Othello Henderson =

American football player (born 1972)

No. 38, 20
- Position: Defensive back

Personal information
- Born: August 23, 1972 (age 54); Killeen, Texas, U.S.
- Listed height: 6 ft 0 in (1.83 m)
- Listed weight: 204 lb (93 kg)

Career information
- High school: Ellison (Killeen)
- College: UCLA (1990–1992)
- NFL draft: 1993: 7th round, 193rd overall pick
- Expansion draft: 1995: 12th round, 23rd overall pick

Career history
- New Orleans Saints (1993–1994); Jacksonville Jaguars (1995)*; Green Bay Packers (1996)*
- * Offseason or practice squad member only

Awards and highlights
- Second-team All-Pac-10 (1992)

Career NFL statistics
- Tackles: 24
- Fumble recoveries: 2
- Stats at Pro Football Reference

Othello Methelda Henderson III (born August 23, 1972) is an American former professional football player who was a defensive back for two seasons with the New Orleans Saints of the National Football League (NFL). He was selected by the New Orleans Saints in the seventh round of the 1993 NFL draft after playing college football for the UCLA Bruins.

== Early life and college ==
Othello Methelda Henderson III was born on August 23, 1972, in Killeen, Texas. He attended Ellison High School in Killeen.

Henderson was a three-year letterman for the Bruins of the University of California, Los Angeles from 1990 to 1992. He recorded two interceptions in 1991 and one interception in 1992. He was named second-team All-Pac-10 by the coaches in 1992. Henderson skipped his senior year to enter the 1993 NFL draft.

== Professional career ==
Henderson was selected by the New Orleans Saints in the seventh round, with the 193rd overall pick, of the 1993 NFL draft. He officially signed with the team on June 22. He was released on August 30 and signed to the practice squad the next day. Henderson was promoted to the active roster on October 14, 1993. He played in five games, starting one, for the Saints during the 1993 season and posted 12 tackles. He appeared in all 16 games in 1994, totaling 11 solo tackles, one assisted tackles, and two fumble recoveries.

In February 1995, Henderson was selected by the Jacksonville Jaguars in the 12th round, with the 23rd overall pick, of the 1995 NFL expansion draft. He was waived by the Jaguars in May 1995.

On January 18, 1996, it was reported that Henderson had been signed by the Green Bay Packers. He was released on April 4, 1996.
