= Pierre Andrew Rinfret =

American economist

Pierre Andre "Pete" Rinfret (/rɪnˈfreɪ/ rin-FRAY; February 1, 1924 – June 29, 2006) was the founder of Rinfret-Boston Associates, an economic advisor to three American Presidents, and the Republican candidate for Governor of New York in 1990.

== Biography ==
Rinfret was born in Montreal, Canada. His father and the entire family emigrated to the United States from Canada on November 12, 1929.

"We emigrated here because my father had gone bankrupt in his fur business. In Canada that was the ultimate disgrace and he was forced out, socially. He did not know a depression was coming in the U.S. and no one else did either. And so he thought he would have a new start. Little did he know what was ahead. He and all of us had gone from the frying pan into the fire!"

A self-made man, he studied electrical engineering at the University of Maine, and was then drafted into the Army in 1944, where he served General George S. Patton in France and received the Bronze Star. Upon his return he received an MBA from New York University, and spent two years in France as a Fulbright Scholar.

Working in the finance industry, he rose to become chairman of Lionel D. Edie in 1965 before forming his own firm. Rinfret served as an economic adviser to Presidents John F. Kennedy, Lyndon Johnson, and Richard Nixon. In 1972, he was a Nixon campaign spokesman, and Nixon offered him a position on the Council of Economic Advisers and later considered him for a cabinet post.

He considered himself a professional financial analyst, first and foremost.

"I am the most proud of ... my 45 years of being a professional analyst of the U.S. and the world. I was always an iconoclast, an icon breaker. I never was afraid to think for myself. More often than not I went against the trend and the accepted wisdom. It got me into trouble quite frequently but my entire career was built on it ..."

== 1990 Run for Governor of New York ==
The Manhattan millionaire—by now styling himself as "Pete" Rinfret—agreed to become the Republican candidate in the 1990 gubernatorial election against Mario Cuomo at the request of former Treasury Secretary William Simon and state Senator Roy Goodman. Rinfret suffered when the Conservative Party of New York declined to cross endorse him and instead gave their support to Dr. Herbert London. Rinfret also contended that the Republican party gave him little or no support, and that there were several key members of the Republican party that was privately supporting London and the Conservatives. Mr. Cuomo went on to win the election with 53 percent, Mr. Rinfret 22 percent and the Conservative candidate, Herbert London, 21 percent. Had Mr. London won a larger percentage the Republican party would have lost the second line of New York State election ballots to the Conservatives.

Pierre considered his run for governor as a moral victory.

"Mario Cuomo was mentioned frequently as a possible Presidential candidate, but after the run against us all that talk died since he won the election with a bare majority. We knocked him out of the Presidential box and out of NY politics. He beat two rank amateurs by the skin of his teeth! Few in the state realized the dire financial and economic condition of the state until my campaign. The very first budget that Mario Cuomo presented to the Legislature after he beat me was almost identical to the one I had proposed and, as the Albany commentators said, "You elect Mario and you get Pierre's budget"

Rudy Giuliani beat Dinkins in the next election and the issue was the deteriorating state of New York City. George Pataki beat Mario Cuomo in the next election on some of the very grounds I had initiated, the deterioration in the state.

The new head of the Republican party in New York said right after the election "We owe Pierre". Mario Cuomo said to my son Peter about a year ago and I quote, "Your father was far more perceptive than I was"."

== Post 1990 ==
He qualified as a pilot in 2000, at age 76, and died in 2006 at age 82.

He had posted his recollections and impressions of people he had known from politics and business on a web site during his retirement, and carried on a significant online correspondence with people from over twenty countries until just a few months before this death. He was attempting to create an 'online memoir' of his life and experiences, from growing up in the Great Depression, to working with economists such as Milton Friedman and Alan Greenspan.

"I first met Alan Greenspan in 1948 when I attended the New York University School of Commerce, Accounts and Finance. At that time I was a junior in my studies and Alan was a sophomore. I was the Senior Fellow in the Economics department and he wanted to get a fellowship in the Department. ... "

== 1990 NYS Republican ticket ==
- Governor: Pierre Rinfret
- Lieutenant Governor: George Yancey
- Comptroller: Edward Regan
- Attorney General: Bernard C. Smith

Party political offices
| Preceded by Andrew O'Rourke | Republican Nominee for Governor of New York; 1990 | Succeeded by George Pataki |
