= Nick Arrojo =

English hairstylist

- Born: 7 January 1966 (age 60); Manchester, England
- Occupation: celebrity hair stylist
- Website: Arrojo Studio

Nick Arrojo (born 7 January 1966) is a celebrity hair stylist based in the SoHo neighborhood of New York City.

Born in Manchester, England, Arrojo worked as a stylist for Vidal Sassoon, Wella International, and Bumble & Bumble salons before starting his own studio in downtown Manhattan in September 2001, the Arrojo Studio, which encompasses Arrojo Education and Arrojo Product. He was the hairstylist on TLC's What Not to Wear for seven years. He recently released his own product line, Arrojo, and is currently working on several how-to books. He is also involved with Wella's "Trend Vision 2006" project.

Some of Arrojo's celebrity clients include supermodels Melissa Keller, Yamila Diaz, and Karen Ferrari; actors Minnie Driver and Liev Schreiber; musicians Bryan Adams and Bernard Sumner; and British comedian and performer Victoria Wood.

Arrojo taught the art of hair coloring to Queer Eye's Kyan Douglas. Arrojo was the resident stylist on TLC's What Not to Wear; he left in 2009 during the show's seventh season and was replaced by Ted Gibson.

He works at Arrojo Studios, and Lina Arrojo gave birth to twin boys named Nico and Marco in February 2010.
