= Roy Miller (American football) =

American football player (born 1987)

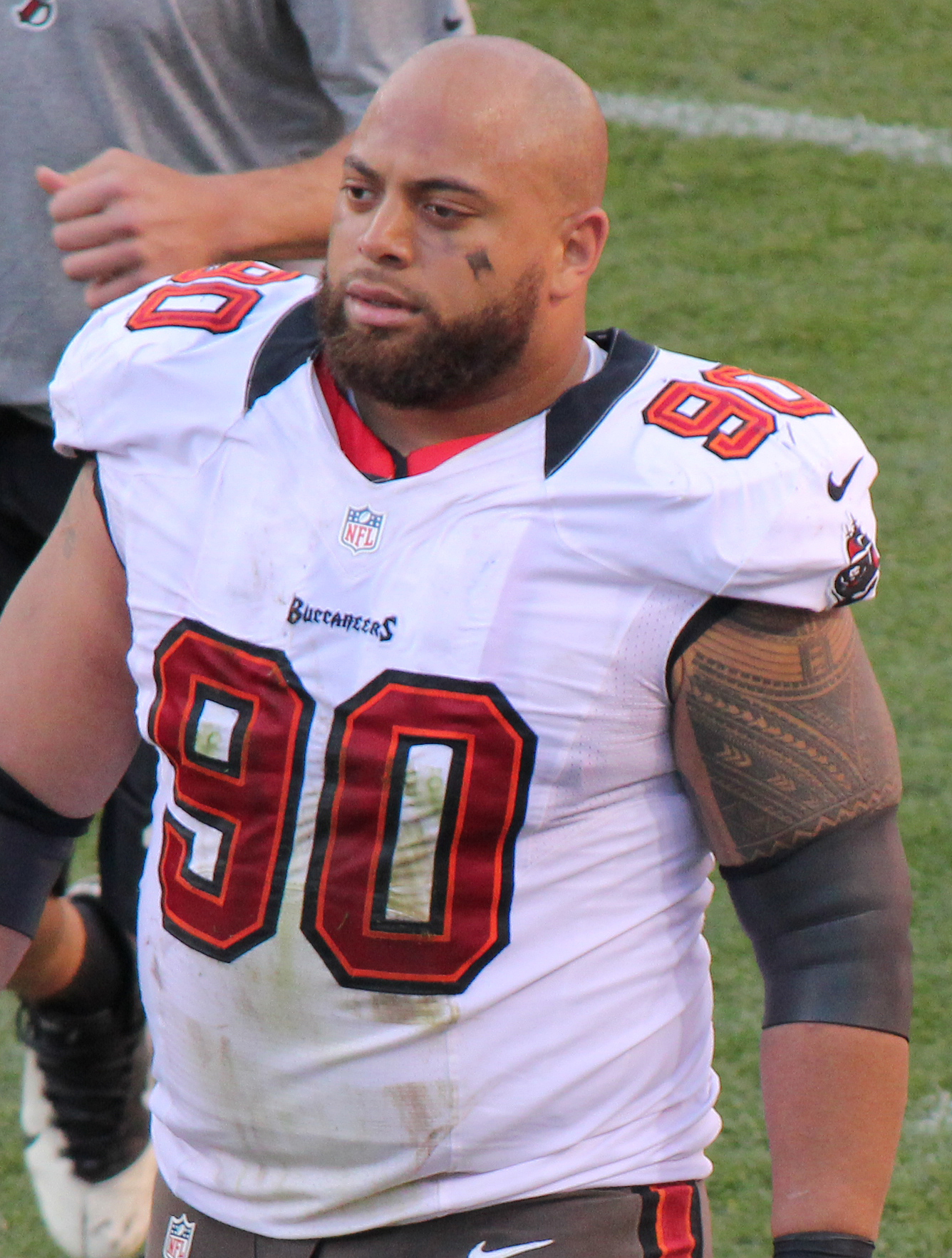
- Miller with the Tampa Bay Buccaneers in 2012

No. 93, 90, 97, 98
- Position: Defensive tackle

Personal information
- Born: July 9, 1987 (age 39); Fort Lewis, Washington, U.S.
- Listed height: 6 ft 2 in (1.88 m)
- Listed weight: 318 lb (144 kg)

Career information
- High school: Shoemaker (Killeen, Texas)
- College: Texas
- NFL draft: 2009: 3rd round, 81st overall pick

Career history
- Tampa Bay Buccaneers (2009–2012); Jacksonville Jaguars (2013–2016); Kansas City Chiefs (2017)

Awards and highlights
- BCS national champion (2005); First-team All-Big 12 (2008); Fiesta Bowl Defensive MVP; Big 12 Champion (2005); 2006 Rose Bowl Champion; 2006 Alamo Bowl Champion; 2007 Holiday Bowl Champion; 2009 Fiesta Bowl Champion

Career NFL statistics
- Total tackles: 252
- Sacks: 8.0
- Forced fumbles: 1
- Stats at Pro Football Reference

Roy Miller (born July 9, 1987) is an American former professional football player who was a defensive tackle for nine seasons in the National Football League (NFL). He played college football for the Texas Longhorns, and was selected by the Tampa Bay Buccaneers in the third round of the 2009 NFL draft. He also played for the Jacksonville Jaguars and Kansas City Chiefs.

== Early life ==
From an army family, Miller was born in Fort Lewis, Washington in 1987. His father was a soldier in the U.S. Army. His family lived in Fort Eustis, Virginia from 1989 to 1996 before moving to Killeen, Texas, when Miller was in middle school. Miller was a star at Shoemaker High School before moving on to the University of Texas at Austin. Miller was an All-American, two-time All-State and three-time All-District performer at defensive tackle and also played some offensive tackle. The All-Area Defensive MVP recorded 111 tackles with 10 sacks, 17 stops for loss, 19 pressures, six pass break-ups and two fumble recoveries, returning one 43 yards for a touchdown as a senior at Shoemaker. In three seasons, the team captain collected 264 tackles with 24 sacks. Roy was a prep All-American who earned practice MVP honors at the U.S. Army All-American Bowl.

== College career ==
Miller attended the University of Texas at Austin from 2005 to 2008 where he won a National Championship, was the 2009 Fiesta Bowl Defensive MVP and was an All Big 12 defensive tackle. He helped the Longhorns to win four straight bowl games. As a freshman he helped the Longhorns win the Big 12, go undefeated and win the National Championship at the 2006 Rose Bowl. The next year he helped the Longhorns go 10-3 and beat Iowa in the Alamo Bowl. During his junior year in 2007 he earned All Big 12 Honorable Mention honors while helping Texas to a top 10 finish and a Holiday Bowl victory. In his senior year he was a First Team All-Big 12 selection as he captained the Longhorns to a 12-1 finish and a #3 final ranking following a 24-21 victory over Ohio State in the Fiesta Bowl.

At UT Roy was a member of UT's Athletics Director's Honor Roll and he was named to the National Honor Roll as a junior.

During his years at UT Roy recorded 138 tackles, 25 TFL, 10 sacks, 44 pressures, six PBD, a forced fumble and a fumble recovery.

He ended his college career playing in the 2009 East-West Shrine Game.

== Professional career ==
=== Tampa Bay Buccaneers ===
Miller was selected by the Tampa Bay Buccaneers in the third round (81st overall) of the 2009 NFL Draft. As a rookie Miller appeared in 15 out of 16 games for the Buccaneers, starting 1 game. Within a heavy rotation composed of Chris Hovan and Ryan Sims, he played a considerable amount of time, finishing his rookie season with 37 tackles, 2 sacks. In 2010, he returned with the Bucs starting all 16 games and finished the season with an impressive 47 tackles, 1 sack. Miller also played short yardage fullback in 2010. In 2011, Miller tore his MCL the first preseason game, causing him to miss the entire preseason. He returned the first game of the year as a reserve player, only to re-injure himself a couple weeks later against the New Orleans saints (bulging discs). Despite the injuries, Miller played every regular season game (starting 3) finishing the season with 36 tackles.

=== Jacksonville Jaguars ===
On March 15, 2013, Miller signed with the Jacksonville Jaguars. He was placed on injured reserve on December 23, 2013.

On October 25, 2016, Miller was placed on injured reserve after sustaining an Achilles tear in Week 7 against the Oakland Raiders.

On March 12, 2017, Miller was released by the Jaguars.

=== Kansas City Chiefs ===
On August 2, 2017, Miller signed with the Kansas City Chiefs. He was released on November 13, 2017, after an arrest for domestic battery; he was subsequently suspended by the NFL for the first six games of 2018 for not cooperating with the NFL's legal team.

=== Retirement ===
Miller had several options and interest to return to football, but ultimately decided to focus on his children and health after a tumultuous divorce that settled after two years and nearly 6 mediated sessions. On June 30, 2018, he announced his retirement, blaming his wife for the controversy surrounding him. Miller has since created several new foundations and spends his time volunteering.

== NFL career statistics ==
Legend
| **Bold** | Career high |

| Year | Team | Games | | Tackles | | | | | Interceptions | | | | | Fumbles | | | |
| Year | Team | GP | GS | Cmb | Solo | Ast | Sck | TFL | Int | Yds | TD | Lng | PD | FF | FR | Yds | TD |
|---|---|---|---|---|---|---|---|---|---|---|---|---|---|---|---|---|---|
| 2009 | TAM | 15 | 1 | 34 | 28 | 6 | 2.0 | 4 | 0 | 0 | 0 | 0 | **1** | 0 | 0 | 0 | 0 |
| 2010 | TAM | **16** | **16** | **47** | **32** | 15 | 1.0 | 1 | 0 | 0 | 0 | 0 | 0 | 0 | 0 | 0 | 0 |
| 2011 | TAM | **16** | 3 | 36 | 20 | 16 | 0.0 | 2 | 0 | 0 | 0 | 0 | 0 | 0 | 0 | 0 | 0 |
| 2012 | TAM | 15 | 14 | 24 | 15 | 9 | 0.0 | 2 | 0 | 0 | 0 | 0 | **1** | 0 | 0 | 0 | 0 |
| 2013 | JAX | 14 | 14 | 24 | 19 | 5 | 0.0 | 3 | 0 | 0 | 0 | 0 | 0 | 0 | 0 | 0 | 0 |
| 2014 | JAX | 14 | 14 | 31 | 21 | 10 | 1.0 | 4 | 0 | 0 | 0 | 0 | **1** | 0 | 0 | 0 | 0 |
| 2015 | JAX | **16** | **16** | 40 | 22 | **18** | **4.0** | **6** | 0 | 0 | 0 | 0 | **1** | **1** | 0 | 0 | 0 |
| 2016 | JAX | 6 | 6 | 10 | 10 | 0 | 0.0 | 1 | 0 | 0 | 0 | 0 | 0 | 0 | 0 | 0 | 0 |
| 2017 | KAN | 7 | 0 | 6 | 2 | 4 | 0.0 | 1 | 0 | 0 | 0 | 0 | **1** | 0 | 0 | 0 | 0 |
| | | 119 | 84 | 252 | 169 | 83 | 8.0 | 24 | 0 | 0 | 0 | 0 | 5 | 1 | 0 | 0 | 0 |

== Personal life ==
Miller is half African-American half Samoan. He is a devout Christian. At the University of Texas, he hosted 150 middle school students at Moncrief-Neuhaus Athletic Center, and regularly spoke at the middle schools and high schools of Killeen. Miller was part of a group of Longhorns that often visited patients at the Austin Children's Hospital. Miller participated in reading and mentoring at local elementary and middle schools and counseling at Austin's local youth centers. Miller continues to visit troops that come and go overseas. At UT Miller organized an event at Ft. Sam Houston near San Antonio where fellow Longhorns greeted, interacted with, and played dodgeball with wounded soldiers. Miller returned to visit Ft. Sam Houston as an NFL player in 2010 as part of the "Pros 4 Vets" organization founded by Toby Keith. He is a part of a group of professional football players from Killeen who put on numerous charity events in the Ft. Hood area including an up-and-coming sports camp. In Tampa Bay, he visits the Joshua House, an organization for foster kids. Miller annually participates in the Children's Cancer Center Christmas Party as well as many of the Glazer families foundations events. Co-founder and President of The Accumulative Advantage Foundation, his goal is to "help young people realize the small opportunities that lead to bigger opportunities, which once over come, create a never ending cycle of success." Roy Miller is engaged to Dr. Rakiya Faulkner and plans to get married after a year (2022)."

== Accolades ==
- Bednarik Award Nominee (Nations top defender) 2008 (University of Texas)
- Honorable mention all conference big twelve 2007 (University of Texas)
- 2008 Fiesta Bowl Most Valuable Player (University of Texas)
- 2008 Roy Williams Leadership Award Recipient (University of Texas)
- 2005 big twelve champion (University of Texas)
- Big twelve player of the week 2008 vs. Colorado (University of Texas)
- 2014 Ed Block courage award recipient (Jaguars)
- 2014 USAA salute to service award (Jaguars)
- 2015 USAA salute to service award (Jaguars)
- 2015 NFL's First Ever Sportsmanship award nominee (Jaguars)
- 2015 ESPN's All AFC South Team (Jaguars)
