= 1990 New York gubernatorial election =

- November 6, 1990
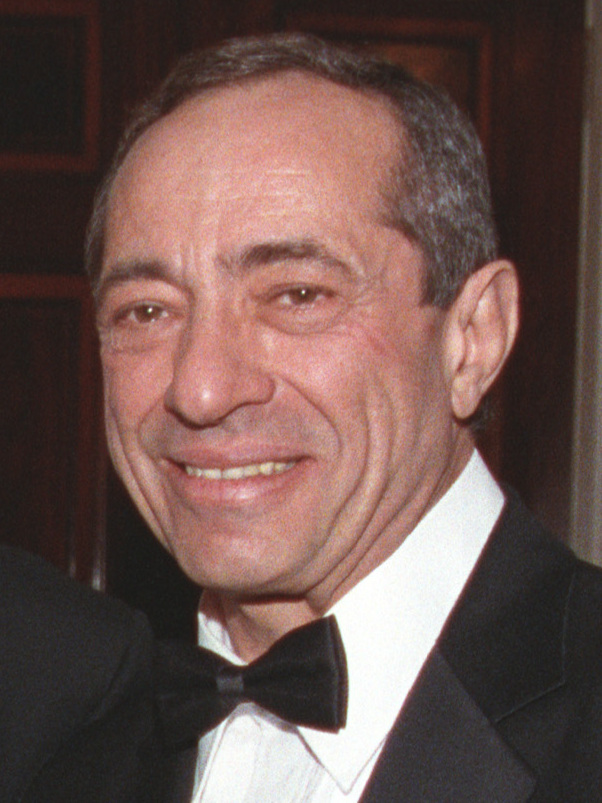

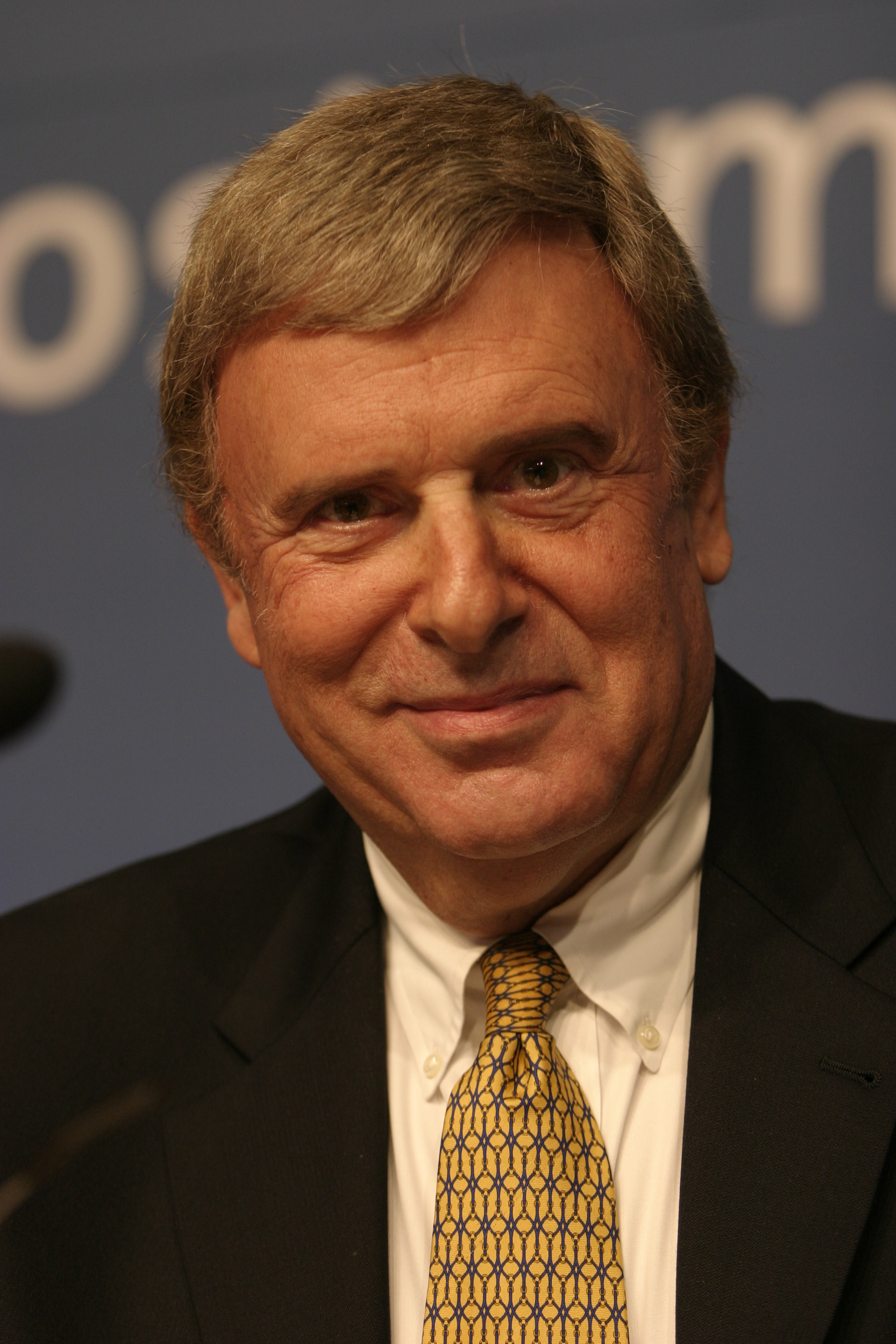
Nominee	Mario Cuomo	Pierre Rinfret	Herbert London
Party	Democratic	Republican	Conservative
Alliance	Liberal
Running mate	Stan Lundine	Geff Yancey	Anthony DiPerna
Popular vote	2,157,087	865,948	827,614
Percentage	53.17%	21.35%	20.40%
- Cuomo: 30–40% 40–50% 50–60% 60–70% 70–80% Rinfret: 30–40% 40–50% London: 30–40% 40–50% Tie: 30–40% 40–50%
Governor before election
Mario Cuomo
Democratic
Elected Governor
Mario Cuomo
Democratic

The 1990 New York gubernatorial election was held on November 6, 1990, to elect the governor and lieutenant governor of New York. Democratic incumbent Mario Cuomo won a third term in office over Republican economist Pierre Andrew Rinfret and Conservative academic Herbert London, with the two right wing parties splitting their tickets for the first time since 1974.

Cuomo won an absolute majority, meaning that the real contest was for second place, which would have secured preferential ballot positioning and major-party privileges under New York election law, including authority on state and county boards of elections, through 1994. Rinfret narrowly edged out London by less than one percent of the overall vote to maintain the Republicans' status as the second largest party in New York.

As of 2026, this remains the strongest performance in a gubernatorial election by the Conservative Party in terms of both votes and percentage.

== Background ==
Mario Cuomo waited until June 1990, within one day of the Democratic Party nominating convention, to officially announce his intention to run for a third term. At the time, opinion polling found that approximately 60 percent of New Yorkers approved of his performance, and his popularity meant that it was assumed that he would win reelection.

== Republican primary ==
=== Candidates ===
Nominee

- Pierre Andrew Rinfret, financial analyst and former advisor to Richard Nixon

==== Disqualified ====
- Evan Galbraith, former U.S. ambassador to France

==== Declined ====
- J. Patrick Barrett, chair of the New York Republican State Committee
- Rudy Giuliani, former U.S. attorney for the Southern District of New York and 1989 candidate for mayor of New York City

In early 1990, Rudy Giuliani and J. Patrick Barrett, Chair of the New York State Republican Party, were considered among the possible contenders for the Republican nomination for governor. However, the party struggled to recruit anyone to challenge the popular Cuomo. At least nineteen candidates rejected overtures to run for governor.

=== Results ===
Ultimately, Pierre Rinfret was nominated by acclamation at the state convention held on May 30 in Rye Brook.

== Legacy ==
Since this election, the closest a minor party has come to taking over Line B with a candidate of its own was in 2002, when Tom Golisano, running on the Independence Party line, received 14.28% of the vote behind Carl McCall's 31.50% on the Democratic line, a difference of 17.22%.

The closest a single candidate has been on two different lines using fusion voting since the 1990 election was in 2006. In that election, John Faso received 23.54% on the Republican line and 3.59% on the Conservative line, a difference of 19.95%.

== General election ==
=== Candidates ===
- Mario Cuomo, incumbent governor since 1983 (Democratic, Liberal)
  - Running mate: Stan Lundine, incumbent lieutenant governor since 1987
- Lenora Fulani, Brooklyn psychologist and perennial candidate (New Alliance)
  - Running mate: Ada Vazquez, Harlem community organizer
- Craig Gannon (Socialist Workers)
  - Running mate: Susan Anmuth, striking Eastern Air Lines machinist
- W. Gary Johnson, Irvington electronics technician (Libertarian)
  - Running mate: Dottie Lou Brokaw
- Herbert London, dean of Gallatin School of Individualized Study at New York University (Conservative)
  - Running mate: Anthony DiPerna, Smithtown deputy highway superintendent
- Pierre Andrew Rinfret, financial analyst and former advisor to Richard Nixon (Republican)
  - Running mate: George Yancey, cheesemonger and former chair of the Wayne County Republican Party
- Louis P. Wein, Staten Island entrepreneur, perennial candidate, and former advisor to Abraham Beame (Right to Life)
  - Running mate: Gertrude Manning, Baldwin schoolteacher

=== Campaign ===
Political commentators noted that lieutenant governor Stan Lundine was more active on the 1990 campaign trail than he had been in 1986. Kevin Sack of The New York Times interpreted this as an effort to boost his name recognition in order to run for governor in an open field in 1994. Cuomo's decision to run for a fourth term in 1994 rendered this question moot.

=== Results ===
New York gubernatorial election, 1990
Party	Candidate	Votes	%	±%
Democratic	Mario Cuomo (incumbent)	2,086,070	51.42%	
Liberal	Mario Cuomo (incumbent)	71,017	1.75%	
Total	Mario Cuomo (incumbent)	2,157,087	53.17%	-11.46%
Republican	Pierre Andrew Rinfret	865,948	21.35%	−10.42%
Conservative	Herbert London	827,614	20.40%	+16.85%
Right to Life	Louis P. Wein	137,804	3.40%	+0.35%
New Alliance	Lenora Fulani	31,089	0.77%	+0.21%
Libertarian	W. Gary Johnson	24,611	0.61%	N/A
Socialist Workers	Craig Gannon	12,743	0.31%	N/A
Majority		1,291,139	31.83%	−1.03%
Turnout		4,056,896		
Democratic hold				
