= Harker Heights High School =

Location
- 1001 FM 2410; Harker Heights, Bell County, Texas 76548-6845; United States; 31.05653°N 97.65094°W

Information
- School type: Public high school
- Locale: Suburb: Midsize
- School district: Killeen ISD
- NCES School ID: 482566008695
- Principal: Jorge Soldevila
- Faculty: 133.38 (on an FTE basis)
- Grades: 9–12
- Enrollment: 2,359 (2022–2023)
- Student to teacher ratio: 17.69
- Colors: Red, black, and white
- Athletics conference: UIL Class 6A
- Mascot: Knights
- Website: www.killeenisd.org/hhhs

Harker Heights High School is a public high school located in Harker Heights, Texas and classified as a 6A school by the University Interscholastic League. It is one of six high schools in Killeen Independent School District located in western Bell County. During 2022–2023, Harker Heights High School had an enrollment of 2,359 students and a student to teacher ratio of 17.69. The school received an overall rating of "B" from the Texas Education Agency for the 2024–2025 school year.

== Athletics ==
The Harker Heights Knights compete in the following sports:

- Baseball
- Basketball
- Cross Country
- Football
- Golf
- Powerlifting
- Soccer
- Softball
- Swimming
- Tennis
- Track and Field
- Volleyball
- Wrestling

== Notable alumni ==
- Dominique Zeigler - Former Baylor University and San Francisco 49ers Wide Receiver.
- Kyle Thompson -Former University of Texas at Austin seven time All-Big 12 Track and Field Athlete.
- Dalenta Stephens - Professional basketball player who played for the Milwaukee Bucks and the Memphis Grizzlies.
- Royce O'Neale - Professional basketball player who plays for the Charlotte Hornets
