= Carmindy =

American make-up artist

- Born: March 26, 1971 (age 54); Newport Beach, California
- Occupation: Celebrity make-up artist
- Spouse: Javier Acosta (divorced)
- Website: www.carmindybeauty.com

Carmindy Kathryn Bowyer, better known by her professional name Carmindy, is an American make-up artist and beauty expert based in New York City. She is best known for her work on the television show What Not to Wear, where she gave makeup advice to people who appeared on the show. She is also a regular beauty expert for Good Morning America, and founder of Carmindy Beauty cosmetics. She still works on fashion photo shoots, sits on a few beauty company boards and does private consults with clients for one-on-one makeovers.

Carmindy's work has been featured in beauty magazines, including InStyle, Elle, Marie Claire, Cosmopolitan, Self, Vogue, GQ, Essence, and Details.

== Early life ==
Carmindy and her brother Quinn were raised in southern California by parents Jack and Julie Anne, a watercolor painter and former model. Growing up, Carmindy was bullied and teased because she was overweight, and turned to art as an escape. Carmindy says she was both fascinated by her mother's watercolors, and inspired by looking at old photos of her grandmother and mother when they were models.

Loving its artistic side, at age 15 Carmindy started playing with makeup and experimenting on friends and neighbors. In high school, her mother took her to John Robert Powers School of Modeling, where she learned the principles of good makeup. In 1989 at the age of 18 she was signed with an agent and began working as a professional makeup artist.

== Business ventures ==
Carmindy has consulted on brand creation for Coty and Sally Hansen, and has been a spokesperson for beauty companies such as Almay, Pond's, Crest, Proactiv, Latisse and more.

In March 2019 she launched her own cosmetics company Carmindy Beauty on QVC. She left in 2022 to partner with ScentBeauty and now sells online at www.carmindybeauty.com. She has a strong social media following and continues to consult with many beauty brands.

Carmindy has published four books:

- Bloom: A Girl's Guide to Growing Up Gorgeous (2014), for budding teenage beauties;
- The 5-Minute Face: The Quick & Easy Makeup Guide for Every Woman (2007), a focus on simple, quick make-up practices;
- Get Positively Beautiful: The Ultimate Guide to Looking and Feeling Gorgeous (2008), to help women find their beauty through positive thinking; and
- Crazy Busy Beautiful: Beauty Secrets for Getting Gorgeous Fast (2010), a return to the beauty tips for which she is known.

== Personal life ==
Carmindy currently lives in New York City.
