= Darrol Ray =

American football player (born 1958)

No. 28
- Position: Safety

Personal information
- Born: June 25, 1958 (age 68); San Francisco, California, U.S.
- Listed height: 6 ft 1 in (1.85 m)
- Listed weight: 200 lb (91 kg)

Career information
- High school: Killeen (TX)
- College: Oklahoma
- NFL draft: 1980: 2nd round, 40th overall pick

Career history
- New York Jets (1980–1984)

Awards and highlights
- PFWA All-Rookie Team (1980); Second-team All-American (1979); 2× First-team All-Big Eight (1978, 1979)

Career NFL statistics
- Interceptions: 21
- Fumble recoveries: 5
- Touchdowns: 4
- Stats at Pro Football Reference

Darrol Anthony Ray (born June 25, 1958) is an American former professional football player who was a safety for the New York Jets of the National Football League (NFL).

== Early life ==
Ray spent his early years in Belgium, Germany, and France while his father served in the United States Army. After his father was discharged, the family moved to Texas, where Ray played quarterback at Killeen High School. He has said that he preferred to play soccer but that the atmosphere in the American South, especially Texas, was primed for football and so he kept it to himself.

== College career ==
After high school, Ray went to the University of Oklahoma, where he switched to defense and played safety. He was also the punter and handled kickoff duties. He ended his career as an Oklahoma Sooners football as a four-year letterman, two time 1st team All-Big Eight and 2nd team All-American. He played in the Hula, Senior, Orange, and Fiesta Bowls. He was also named to Oklahoma's All-Decade Team.

== Professional career ==
In 1980, he was selected 40th overall in the second round by the New York Jets. He played 5 seasons with them, finishing his career with 21 interceptions, in which he returned for 581 yards and 3 touchdowns. He also recovered five fumbles, returning them for 131 yards and a score. In a 44–17 win over the Cincinnati Bengals in a playoff game after the 1982 season, Ray set an NFL playoff record by returning an interception 98 yards for a touchdown. Chances for appearing in the Super Bowl evaporated when the Jets lost to the Miami Dolphins two games later in the American Football Conference championship game.

== Post-football life ==
Ray currently lives in Norman, Oklahoma, where he graduated from college. He owned a liquor store for 15 years, which he recently closed to open his restaurant, Ray's Smokehouse BBQ.
