= Love, Lust or Run =

American reality television series

- Genre: Reality
- Based on: Snog Marry Avoid?
- Presented by: Stacy London
- Country of origin: United States
- Original language: English
- No. of seasons: 3
- No. of episodes: 40

Production
- Running time: 22 minutes
- Production company: True Entertainment

Original release
- Network: TLC
- Release: January 23, 2015 – March 25, 2016

Love, Lust or Run is an American reality television series which premiered on the TLC cable network, on January 30, 2014, starring fashion consultant Stacy London. During every episode of the series, Stacy London meets a different woman and helps her to work on usually very questionable fashion choices. The show follows the same format as British television series Snog Marry Avoid?. Ahead of the conclusion of the first season, TLC renewed the show for 26 additional episodes.

"I am so thrilled to have Stacy back on TLC!" said Nancy Daniels, the general manager of the network. "She has an amazing ability to connect with fashion challenged women and help them find their own sense of style. With this new show, we definitely put Stacy's skills to the test," Daniels also added. Stacy London had previously hosted another fashion-themed show, What Not to Wear, which aired on the same network.

== Series overview ==
Season	Episodes	Originally released	
Season	Episodes	First released	Last released
1	13	January 23, 2015	March 20, 2015
2	11	June 12, 2015	August 27, 2015
3	16	January 1, 2016	March 25, 2016
