= Fashionably Late with Stacy London =

- Genre: Talk show
- Presented by: Stacy London
- Judges: Roger Garth
- Country of origin: United States
- Original language: English
- No. of seasons: 1
- No. of episodes: 6

Production
- Running time: 60 minutes

Original release
- Network: TLC
- Release: November 23 – December 28, 2007

Fashionably Late with Stacy London is an American late-night talk and variety show on TLC hosted by Stacy London. As of February 8, 2008, the show no longer appeared on TLC's TV show schedule.

The show aired weekly on Friday night at 10 pm EST. The show was filmed before a live studio audience and features a wide range of topics such as fashion, relationships, entertainment, celebrity gossip and fashion makeovers. Celebrity guests were also brought on the show to discuss current fashion trends.
