= Killeen High School =

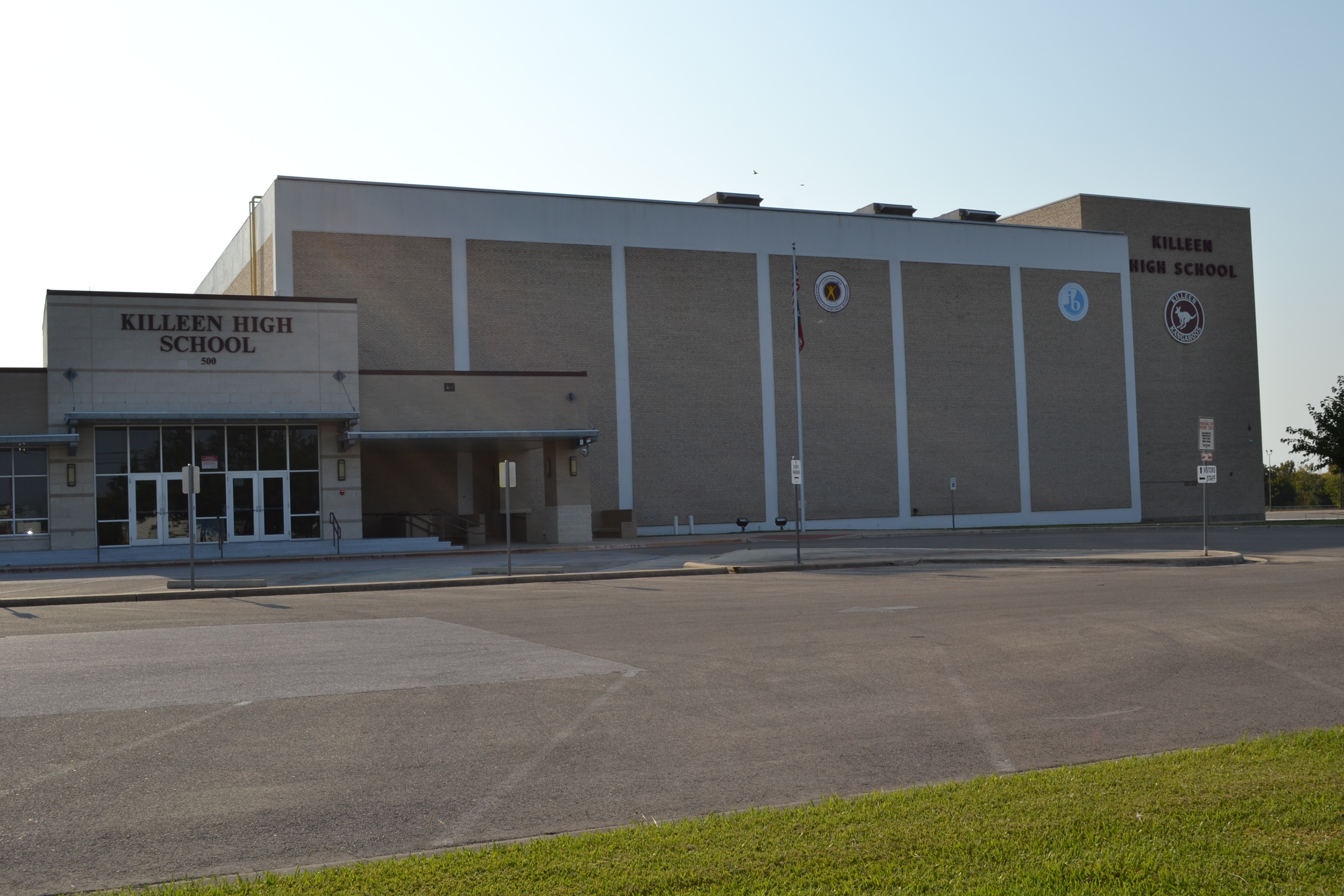

Location
- 500 North 38th Street; Killeen, Bell County, Texas 76543-7899; United States; 31.1119°N 97.6979°W

Information
- School type: Public, high school
- Locale: City: Midsize
- School district: Killeen ISD
- NCES School ID: 482566002871
- Principal: Kara Trevino
- Faculty: 124.55 (on an FTE basis)
- Grades: 9–12
- Enrollment: 2,166 (2023–2024)
- Student to teacher ratio: 17.39
- Colors: Maroon and white
- Athletics conference: UIL Class AAAAAA
- Mascot: Kanga
- Nickname: Kangaroos
- Website: www.killeenisd.org/khs

Killeen High School is a public high school located in Killeen, Texas and classified as a 6A school by the University Interscholastic League. It is one of six high schools in the Killeen Independent School District, which is located in western Bell County. During 2023–2024, Killeen High School had an enrollment of 2,166 students and a student to teacher ratio of 17.39. The school received an overall rating of "C" from the Texas Education Agency for the 2024–2025 school year.

== Athletics ==
The Killeen Kangaroos compete in the following sports:

- Baseball
- Basketball
- Bowling
- Cheerleading
- Cross Country
- Football
- Golf
- Soccer
- Softball
- Swimming and Diving
- Tennis
- Track and Field
- Volleyball
- Wrestling

=== State titles ===
- Football – 1991 (5A/D1)
- Boys Track – 1978 (4A), 1979 (4A), 1980 (4A), 1981 (5A), 1991 (5A)

==== State finalists ====
- Football – 1954 (2A)
- Volleyball – 1976 (4A)
- Girls Water Polo – 1981, 1982, 1983
- Cheerleading – 2018 (6A)
- Boys Swimming – 1979

== Notable alumni ==
- Mark Adickes, former NFL player
- Brandon Bernard, murderer
- Don Hardeman, former NFL player
- Juaquin Iglesias, former NFL player
- Jeff Jones, former NFL player
- Anthony McDowell, former NFL player
- David McMillan, former NFL player
- Gerald McNeil, former NFL player
- Pat McNeil, former NFL player
- Chris Morgan, current NFL coach
- Darrol Ray, former NFL player
- TaShawn Thomas (born 1993), basketball player in the Israeli Premier League
- Craig Watts, former NFL player and coach
- Cory Jefferson, former NBA player

== See also ==
- List of high schools in Texas
