= Chris Morgan (American football) =

American football player and coach

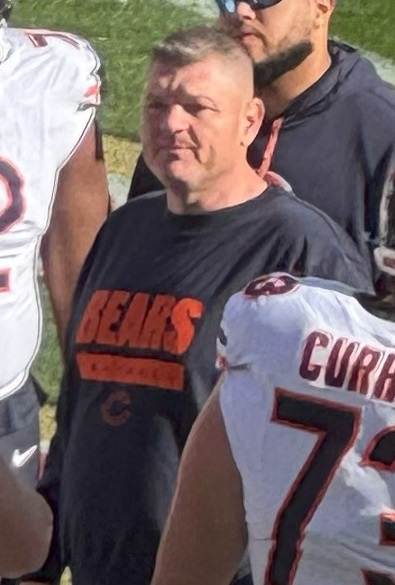
- Morgan with the Chicago Bears in 2024

Denver Broncos
- Title: Offensive line coach

Personal information
- Born: Killeen, Texas, U.S.
- Listed height: 6 ft 3 in (1.91 m)
- Listed weight: 305 lb (138 kg)

Career information
- Position: Guard
- High school: Killeen (Killeen, Texas)
- College: Colorado (1995–1999)

Career history
- Copperas Cove HS (TX) (2000–2001) Assistant coach; Idaho (2002–2003) Offensive graduate assistant; Westfield HS (TX) (2004–2008) Offensive coordinator & special teams coordinator; Oakland Raiders (2009–2010) Assistant offensive line coach; Washington Redskins (2011–2013) Assistant offensive line coach; Seattle Seahawks (2014) Assistant offensive line coach; Atlanta Falcons (2015–2020) Offensive line coach; Pittsburgh Steelers (2021) Assistant offensive line coach; Chicago Bears (2022–2024); Offensive line coach (2022–2023); Offensive line coach & run game coordinator (2024); Denver Broncos (2025–present); Assistant offensive line coach (2025); Offensive line coach (2026–present)

Chris Morgan is an American professional football coach and former guard who is the offensive line coach for the Denver Broncos of the National Football League (NFL).

== College career ==
After graduating from Killeen High School in Killeen, Texas, Morgan played college football at University of Colorado from 1995 to 1999, where he played as an offensive lineman. Morgan later received his master's degree in educational leadership from the University of Idaho.

== Coaching career ==
=== Copperas Cove ===
Morgan first coached as an assistant to the football team at Copperas Cove High School.

=== Idaho ===
In 2002, he served as a graduate assistant for Idaho.

=== Westfield ===
Starting in 2004, Morgan coached a plethora of positions, including offensive coordinator and special teams coordinator at Westfield High School, where he would coach until 2008.

=== Oakland Raiders ===
Morgan received his first NFL coaching job in 2009 when he was hired as the assistant offensive line coach for the Oakland Raiders.

=== Washington Redskins ===
Following the 2010 season, Morgan left the Raiders and was hired as the assistant offensive line coach by the Washington Redskins, which he held from 2011 to 2013.

=== Seattle Seahawks ===
In 2014, Morgan joined the Seattle Seahawks in the same capacity.

=== Atlanta Falcons ===
After the 2014 season, Morgan followed former Seahawks defensive coordinator Dan Quinn to the Atlanta Falcons, where Morgan was hired as the offensive line coach and stayed there until 2020.

=== Pittsburgh Steelers ===
Following Quinn's firing by the Falcons, Morgan was hired by the Pittsburgh Steelers and became their assistant offensive line coach in 2021.

=== Chicago Bears ===
Morgan became the offensive line coach again in 2022 when he was hired by the Chicago Bears in that capacity. In 2024, Morgan also assumed the role as the offensive run game coordinator for the Bears. On January 23, 2025, after the regular season, Morgan was let go by the Bears following the hire of Ben Johnson.

=== Denver Broncos ===
On March 6, 2025, Morgan was hired as the Denver Broncos' assistant offensive line coach, replacing the recently promoted Austin King. Ahead of the 2026 season, Morgan was promoted to offensive line coach.
