= Killeen Independent School District =

School district in Texas, United States

Address
- 202 North W.S. Young Drive Killeen, Texas, 76543-4025; United States

District information
- Type: Independent school district
- Motto: Teach so that students learn to their maximum potential.
- Superintendent: Dr. King Davis
- Governing agency: Texas Education Agency
- Schools: 53 total

Students and staff
- Students: 45,500
- Staff: 7,000

Other information
- Website: www.killeenisd.org

Killeen Independent School District is a public school district based in Killeen, Texas (USA).

In addition to Killeen, the district serves the cities of Harker Heights and Nolanville as well as all students residing at Fort Hood. The district covers western Bell County and a small portion of Coryell County.

The district received an overall rating of "C" from the Texas Education Agency for the 2024-2025 school year.

== Schools ==
=== High Schools (Grades 9-12) ===
- Chaparral High School
  - 4400 Chaparral Road Killeen, TX 76542
- Early College High School
  - (9th & 10th Grade) 51000 Tank Destroyer Boulevard Ft. Cavazos, TX 76544
  - (11th & 12th Grade) 6200 W. Central Texas Expressway Killeen, TX 76549
- Ellison High School
  - 909 E. Elms Road Killeen, TX 76542
- Harker Heights High School (Harker Heights)
  - 1001 E. FM 2410 Road Harker Heights, TX 76548
- Killeen High School
  - 500 N. 38th Street Killeen, TX 76543
- Shoemaker High School
  - 3302 S. Clear Creek Road Killeen, TX 76549
- Gateway (High School)
  - 4100 Zephyr Drive Killeen, TX 76543

=== Middle Schools (Grades 6-8) ===
- Audie Murphy
  - 53393 Sun Dance Drive Fort Cavazos, TX 76544
- Charles E. Patterson
  - 8383 W. Trimmier Road Killeen, TX 76542
- Dr. Jimmie Don Aycock (JDA)
  - 5360 Chaparral Road Killeen, TX 76542
- Gateway (Middle School)
  - 1307 Gowen Drive Killeen, TX 76543
- Liberty Hill
  - 4500 Kit Carson Trail Killeen, TX 76542
- Live Oak Ridge
  - 2600 Robinett Road Killeen, TX 76549
- Manor
  - 1700 S. W.S. Young Drive Killeen, TX 76543
- Nolan
  - 1600 Warriors Path Harker Heights, TX 76548
- Rancier
  - 3301 Hilliard Avenue Killeen, TX 76543
- Roy J. Smith
  - 6000 Brushy Creek Drive Killeen, TX 76549
- Union Grove
  - 101 E. Iowa Drive Harker Heights, TX 76548

=== Elementary Schools (Grades PK-5) ===
- Alice W. Douse
  - 700 Rebecca Lynn Lane Killeen, TX 76542
- Brookhaven
  - 3221 Hilliard Avenue Killeen, TX 76543
- Cedar Valley
  - 4801 Chantz Drive Killeen, TX 76542
- Clarke
  - 51612 Comanche Avenue Fort Cavazos, TX 76544
- Clear Creek
  - 4800 Washington Street Fort Cavazos, TX 76544
- Clifton Park
  - 1801 S. 2nd Street Killeen, TX 76541
- Dr. Joseph A. Fowler
  - 4910 Katy Creek Lane Killeen, TX 76549
- Harker Heights (Elementary)
  - 726 S. Ann Boulevard Harker Heights, TX 76548
- Hay Branch
  - 6101 Westcliff Road Killeen, TX 76543
- Haynes
  - 3309 W. Canadian River Loop Killeen, TX 76549
- Iduma
  - 4400 Foster Lane Killeen, TX 76549
- Ira Cross
  - 1910 Herndon Drive Killeen, TX 76543
- Killeen (Elementary)
  - 1608 E. Rancier Avenue Killeen, TX 76541
- Maude Moore Wood
  - 6410 Morganite Lane Killeen, TX 76542
- Maxdale
  - 2600 Westwood Drive Killeen, TX 76549
- Meadows
  - 423 27th Street Fort Cavazos, TX 76544
- Montague Village
  - 84001 Clements Drive Fort Cavazos, TX 76544
- Mountain View
  - 500 Mountain Lion Road Harker Heights, TX 76548
- Nolanville
  - 901 Old Nolanville Road Nolanville, TX 76559
- Oveta Culp Hobby
  - 53210 Lost Moccasin Fort Cavazos, TX 76544
- Pat Carney
  - 5501 Azura Way Killeen, TX 76549
- Pershing Park
  - 1500 W. Central Texas Expressway Killeen, TX 76549
- Reeces Creek
  - 400 W. Stan Schlueter Loop Killeen, TX 76542
- Richard E. Cavazos
  - 1200 N. 10th Street Nolanville, TX 76559
- Saegert
  - 5600 Schorn Drive Killeen, TX 76542
- Skipcha
  - 515 Prospector Trail Harker Heights, TX 76548
- Timber Ridge
  - 5402 White Rock Drive Killeen, TX 76542
- Trimmier
  - 4400 Success Drive Killeen, TX 76542
- Venable Village
  - 60160 Venable Road Fort Cavazos, TX 76544
- Willow Springs
  - 2501 W. Stan Schlueter Loop Killeen, TX 76549
