= Wayne Scot Lukas =

American fashion consultant

- Born: Wayne Scot Lukas
- Known for: Fashion design
- Notable work: Super Bowl XXXVIII halftime show controversy

Wayne Scot Lukas (born February 1965) is an American fashion consultant, best known as the former co-host of the makeover reality television program What Not to Wear which was broadcast on TLC in the United States and Canada. Clinton Kelly took over as co-host in 2003.

== Early life and career ==
Lukas was born and raised in Bergenfield, New Jersey. His costume designs were featured in the Metropolitan Museum of Art's "Rock Style" exhibit. He also styled Justin Timberlake's wardrobe on the 2003 Justified and Stripped Tour.

Lukas served as the spokesperson to promote "What To Wear" in photographs with Kodak Perfect Touch. For several years he has been resident stylist and has provided style tips to Der Spiegel magazine.

On March 28, 2007, Lukas designed a fashion line for Home Shopping Network called Lukastyle.

=== Controversy ===
Lukas' role in the Janet Jackson wardrobe malfunction during the Super Bowl XXXVIII halftime show remains in dispute as Lukas remained silent on whether or not the wardrobe was intentionally designed to reveal Jackson's breast.
