= The Shot (TV series) =

- Created by: Nigel Barker
- Presented by: Russell James
- No. of seasons: 1
- No. of episodes: 8

Original release
- Network: VH1
- Release: 2007 – December 23, 2007

The Shot is a reality television show created by Nigel Barker and produced by VH1 in 2007. The Shot included 10 aspiring fashion photographers working through a series of games in order to win the competition. Russell James was the host/mentor.

The winner of season 1 of the show, as announced on December 23, 2007, was Maria Hartman. She beat Dean on the final challenge, and her winning shot will be used on the cover of Victoria's Secret annual catalog. The shot is of model Alessandra Ambrosio. Maria will also receive a $100,000 and a spread on Marie Claire magazine as prizes.

== Contestants ==
Airic

- 38 years old
- Has been shooting for over 10 years
- Currently works as a photographer, make-up artist, and stylist
- Originally from Nebraska, currently lives in Los Angeles
- Has a newborn son

Balbinka

- 24 years old
- Former model
- Started taking photographs in college 5 years ago
- Originally from Poland but currently lives in Los Angeles
- Lived in Belgium where she worked for the European Parliament
- Loves to dance West African, ballroom, and modern
- Has traveled extensively all over the world and photographed her journey

Bree

- 26 years old
- Originally from Perth, Western Australia, currently lives in Venice, CA
- Photographer for the Warp Tour
- Also hosts a syndicated music show

Dean Zulich

- 34 years old
- Originally from Bosnia, currently lives in Seattle, WA
- Came to America to follow a girl
- Graduated from The Art Institute of Seattle in March 2007
- Was in the Bosnian army, fought in the Bosnian War
- Defied death: was shot at in war and was hit by a car moving 90 miles (140 km) per hour
- Used to own a clothing store in Seattle

Ivan

- 27 years old
- Came to the U.S. in 1998 from Croatia
- Learned to speak English 9 years ago so he could study photography in the U.S.
- Graduate of Brooks Institute of Photography in Santa Barbara, CA
- Currently pitching proposals to ad agencies and looking for the photo rep
- Eats a raw food diet
- Loves to go dancing

Jason

- 39 years old
- Professional photographer
- Married to a make-up artist
- Lives in Los Angeles
- Former pro-golfer
- Comes from a film industry family

John

- 24 years old
- Lives in Los Angeles
- Wedding Photographer
- Has traveled to 20 countries
- Personal goal is to travel to 4 different countries a year
- Self-taught photographer
- Drank the blood and ate the heart of a viper snake in Vietnam

Maria Hartman

- 26 years old
- Lives in Los Angeles
- Photo Retoucher/Freelance Photographer
- Used to assist David LaChapelle and Paula Abdul
- Oldest of 6 girls

Piper

- 35 years old
- Originally from Nigeria, currently lives in Detroit
- Freelance Photographer and part-time cocktail server
- Avidly practices yoga
- Shot for Essence Magazine
- Dream is to shoot for Vogue magazine
- Into French avant-garde and 1970's cinema

Robin

- 36 years old
- Freelance Photographer
- Has been shooting for over 20 years
- Specializes in shooting live music and rock & roll photography
- Bass player and fire breather
- Originally from New York City, currently lives in Los Angeles
- Shot Marilyn Manson's Portrait of an American Family album cover

== Results ==
	1	2	3	4	5	6	7	Finale
Maria	SAFE	WIN	RISK	SAFE	WIN	WIN	SAFE	WINNER
Dean	WIN	SAFE	WIN	WIN	WIN	WIN	WIN	RUNNER-UP
John	SAFE	SAFE	SAFE	WIN	SAFE	SAFE	RISK	3RD PLACE
Jason	WIN	WIN	WIN	SAFE	RISK	RISK	OUT	
Robin	WIN	WIN	WIN	RISK	WIN	OUT		
Airic	SAFE	SAFE	SAFE	WIN	OUT			
Piper	RISK	RISK	WIN	OUT				
Bree	WIN	SAFE	OUT					
Ivan	WIN	OUT						
Balbinka	OUT							

This photographer was on the winning team.
This photographer had the best shot of the week.
This photographer was on the losing team.
This photographer was on the losing team and was in the bottom two.
This photographer was on the losing team and was eliminated.

== Challenges ==
- "Passion" with Nudes
- "Stormy Romance" on a Sailing Yacht
- "Animal Frenzy" with a camel, tarantula, and monkey
- "Truth and Hair" with 3D photography
- "Vaseline Skin Care Campaign"
- "Marie Claire Campaign" with Joss Stone
