= Glam4Good =

American nonprofit foundation

- Founded: 2013
- Type: 501(c)(3) charity
- Location: 145 Palisade Street, Suite 218, Dobbs Ferry, NY 10522
- Key people: Mary Alice Stephenson, founder and CEO
- Website: glam4good.com

Glam4Good (styled GLAM4GOOD) is a New York-based nonprofit foundation that distributes unused clothing, personal care items and other necessities to families in need and provides grants empowering female social entrepreneurs.

Philanthropist and fashion editor Mary Alice Stephenson founded Glam4Good as a grassroots movement after leaving an editorial position at Harper's Bazaar in 2012. In 2013, the organization was established as a 501(c)(3) nonprofit.

As of August 2024, it had distributed more than $75 million in new clothing and personal-care items to more than 170,000 recipients in 32 U.S. states in a variety of circumstances of need, such as cancer survivors, abuse victims, foster children, veterans in need of aid, and survivors of disasters such as hurricanes and wildfires. For example, donating $4.6 million worth of goods at a pop-up event benefiting victims of Los Angeles wildfires in March 2025. Glam4Good diverts these surplus items from the fashion and beauty industries so that they do not become waste.

The foundation distributes the items through direct shipments and pop-up events, and partners with fashion and personal-care brands and with organizations and agencies such as the Council of Fashion Designers of America and the Administration for Children's Services in New York City. It sponsors social welfare events such as the MIT Sloan Club of New York's 2025 Social Good Prize. Glam4Good partnered with Ulta Beauty in 2024 on a kit of products from BIPOC-founded companies. In 2025, the nonprofit awarded Social Good Grants to startups involved in charitable giving and healthcare equity. In 2025, Stephenson was named to Fast Company's Impact Council.

Glam4Good has also collaborated with celebrities such as Oprah Winfrey and Michelle Obama. The organization worked with Obama in 2015 to donate essentials like strollers and diaper bags as well as beauty products to military mothers-to-be.
