= Ted Gibson =

American hairdresser

Ted Gibson is a celebrity hairdresser with a salon in New York City. He is the hair expert on the cable show What Not to Wear. Notable clients include Anne Hathaway, Renée Zellweger, Kate Gosselin, Ashley Greene and the fashion houses Chanel and Prada.
