= What Not to Wear (American TV series) =

American television series (2003–2013)

- Genre: Reality
- Based on: What Not to Wear (UK)
- Presented by: Stacy London; Wayne Scot Lukas (season 1); Clinton Kelly (season 2–10)
- Starring: Makeover artists; Carmindy; Nick Arrojo (season 1–6); Ted Gibson (season 7–10)
- Narrated by: Adam Harrington
- Country of origin: United States
- Original language: English
- No. of seasons: 10
- No. of episodes: 345

Production
- Executive producers: Elli Hakami; Jane Tranter; Jo Honig; Matthew Vafiadis
- Running time: 42 minutes
- Production company: BBC Worldwide Productions

Original release
- Network: TLC
- Release: January 18, 2003 – October 18, 2013

What Not to Wear is an American makeover reality television series based on the British show of the same name. The show premiered on January 18, 2003, and ended on October 18, 2013, airing on TLC in the United States. What Not to Wear was hosted by Stacy London and Clinton Kelly, though London's Season 1 co-host was Wayne Scot Lukas. Also part of the show was head makeover artist Carmindy and hairstylist Nick Arrojo from season 1 through season 6. Celebrity hairstylist Ted Gibson replaced Arrojo beginning in season 7, through season 10.

On March 6, 2013, TLC announced that the tenth season of What Not to Wear would be its last.

== Format ==
Participants were nominated by friends, co-workers, or relatives. Some episodes involved self-nominations, such as the class reunion specials or mall nominations. In the latter, What Not to Wear set up a 360-degree mirror in various malls across the United States, which allowed women to explain why they needed fashion help. Early episodes featured both men and women; however, as the men's transformations did not prove to be as remarkable, all later episodes featured women exclusively. Some episodes featured both the nominee and the nominator being selected for a makeover.

When a woman was selected, the show secretly followed and videotaped her for two weeks. Sometimes the nominee would be asked to participate in "market research" by a camera crew which was actually the What Not to Wear crew filming her pre-makeover look for the show. Also, the nominators sometimes gained access to the nominee's closet to point out specific items of clothing that they considered particularly bad.

While reviewing the secret footage, Stacy and Clinton would comment, in sometimes caustic style, on why the nominee's wardrobe was unflattering ("mom jeans") or out-dated (purchased in the 1980s) and they would usually meet with the nominators before meeting the nominee. Afterward, the entire group would go to meet the soon-to-be-surprised nominee. During the surprise visit, the nominee was offered a $5,000 Visa debit card (in later seasons, the card was an unbranded $5,000 gift card) for the purpose of buying a new wardrobe if she would turn over her entire existing wardrobe to Stacy and Clinton and shop by their "rules" (shopping guidelines tailored for her age, body shape, and profession). If the nominee accepted the terms of the offer then Stacy and Clinton would give them the gift card and review the secret footage with them. If she declined, nothing further is filmed and there is no show. Nominees were sometimes very reluctant to agree and had to be persuaded by Stacy and Clinton and the nominators.

After reviewing the secret footage, the nominee was brought to New York City for a week of evaluation, shopping, and hair and make-up styling. Throughout the week, the nominee frequently declared she was unable to find properly fitting clothes, she disliked her body, or she didn't care what other people thought.

On the first day, Stacy and Clinton would sort through the nominee's current wardrobe, and she would step inside a 360-degree mirror to explain what she liked about her regular outfits and why she thought they looked good on her. After critiquing each outfit, Stacy and Clinton presented a more "appropriate" outfit to the participant to help illustrate the "rules" for the participant to follow when shopping for new clothes. Throughout the sorting process, most of the clothes were symbolically tossed in a large garbage can; however, they were actually donated to charity as long as they were not torn or damaged.

On the second day, the participant was filmed shopping on her own in various New York stores including Mexx, New York & Company, Ann Taylor, Filene's Basement, Searle, H&M, Bloomingdales, Macy's, and Montmartre. Stacy and Clinton watched the videotaped footage and commented, for the benefit of the viewers/audience, on whether or not the participant was following the "rules".

On the third day, Stacy and Clinton would surprise the participant, comment on whether the previous day's purchases followed the "rules", and help her with the remainder of the shopping. If the participant had not followed the rules, the clothes may have to be returned.

On the fourth day, hair stylist Nick Arrojo, and later hair stylist Ted Gibson, and make-up artist Carmindy transformed the participant's appearance. At this stage, Stacy and Clinton were not present.

On the fifth and last day in New York, the participant showed off her new look to Stacy and Clinton—in three of her new outfits. Stacy and Clinton then commented on how her new look flatters her body and generally improves her appearance.

The last segment featured a party in the participant's hometown, where she would show off her new look to friends and family, who would comment on how impressed they were and how happy she looked. With the credits rolling, the participant was shown in additional wardrobe items, and commented on what the experience did for her emotionally and how it improved her confidence.

== Cast ==
- Stacy London, fashion consultant hostess and narrator
- Wayne Scot Lukas, fashion consultant and host
- Clinton Kelly, fashion consultant host and narrator
- Ted Gibson, hair stylist
- Nick Arrojo, hair stylist
- Carmindy, make-up artist
- Adam J. Harrington, narrator

=== Former ===
Season one was co-hosted by Stacy London and Wayne Scot Lukas, a celebrity stylist. In season two, he was succeeded by Clinton Kelly. In seasons one through six, Nick Arrojo was the hair stylist. In season seven, Ted Gibson replaced him beginning with the July 24 episode. In 2008, narrator Adam J. Harrington resigned; from that point, the show was narrated by Stacy and Clinton.

=== Celebrity participants ===
Former participants include independent singer/songwriter Megan Slankard, American pop star Tiffany, ballroom choreographer Melanie LaPatin, world champion swimmer Tara Kirk, and actresses Mayim Bialik, Shannon Elizabeth, Tina Yothers, and Mindy Cohn.

== Ending ==
TLC aired the last episodes of What Not to Wear in Fall 2013. TLC general manager Amy Winter stated, "After 10 incredible seasons, we felt that it was the right time to end the series." Stacy London said, "This show changed me and the trajectory of my life... I've learned so much from all of our contributors [participants] over the years. I hope we touched them as much as they touched me. I hope we touched our viewers... I will always cherish the time I spent on 'WNTW' and be eternally grateful to TLC for a great co-host, amazing crew and an awesome program." Clinton Kelly said, "When I got the job, I told everyone I knew that we’d probably do 10 episodes, get canceled and I’d go crawling back to my old job in magazine publishing. So, I’m more surprised than anyone that we’ve lasted this long. At first I thought the essence of the show was making snarky remarks about people’s outfits, but as it turns out, 'WNTW' is about taking stock of who you are and communicating that non-verbally to the rest of the world. That’s incredibly empowering."

In a two-hour series finale, the hosts take a road trip to The Venetian Las Vegas to attend an end-of-the-show party. Along the way from New York to Las Vegas, they visit past contributors and reminisce on the road. The song played on the road entitled "World Out There" was written and performed by Andy Gruhin. Once they hit Vegas, Stacy and Clinton find one last makeover candidate wandering the hotel which results in their final makeover ever. It all leads up to a finale party, where more than 100 past contributors from the past 10 seasons bid farewell to Stacy, Clinton, Ted, and Carmindy.
