= Self-help =

Self-guided improvement

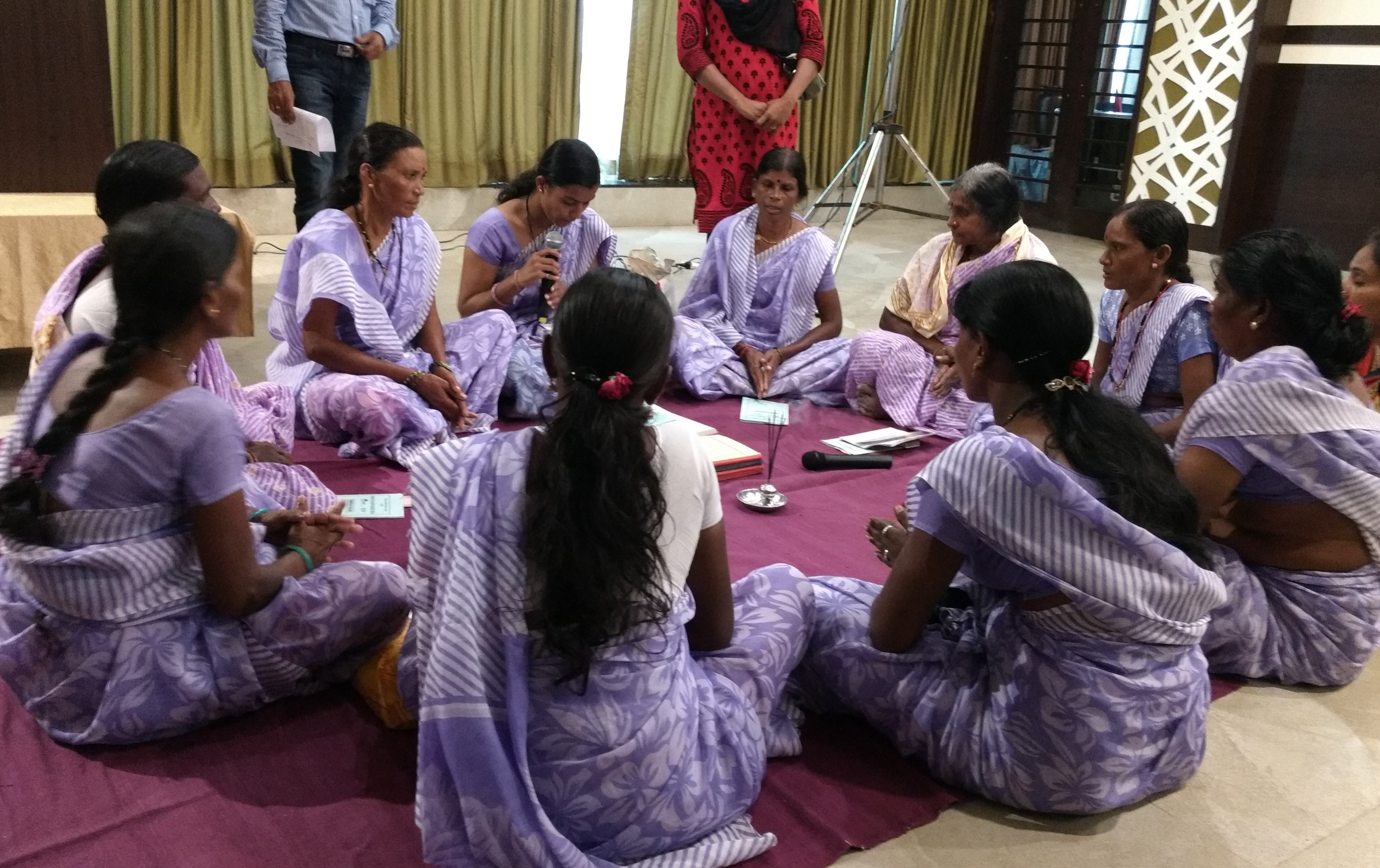
A self-help group from Maharashtra, India, making a demonstration at a National Rural Livelihood Mission seminar held in Chandrapur

Self-help or self-improvement is "a focus on self-guided, in contrast to professionally guided, efforts to cope with life problems" —economically, physically, intellectually, or emotionally—often with a substantial psychological basis.

When engaged in self-help, people often use publicly available information, or support groups—on the Internet as well as in person—in which people in similar situations work together. From early examples in pro se legal practice and home-spun advice, the connotations of the word have spread and often apply particularly to education, business, exercise, psychology, and psychotherapy, as commonly distributed through the popular genre of self-help books. According to the APA Dictionary of Psychology, potential benefits of self-help groups that professionals may not be able to provide include friendship, emotional support, experiential knowledge, identity, meaningful roles, and a sense of belonging.

Many different self-help group programs exist, each with its own focus, techniques, associated beliefs, proponents, and in some cases leaders. Concepts and terms originating in self-help culture and Twelve-Step culture, such as recovery, dysfunctional families, and codependency have become integrated into mainstream language.

Self-help groups associated with health conditions may consist of patients and caregivers. As well as featuring long-time members sharing experiences, these health groups can become support groups and clearinghouses for educational material. Those who help themselves by learning and identifying health problems can be said to exemplify self-help, while self-help groups can be seen more as peer-to-peer or mutual-support groups.

== Precursors ==
From classical antiquity, Hesiod's Works and Days is often considered an early example of moral and instructional literature. Scholars such as Lilah Grace Canevaro describe it as a poem teaching self-sufficiency, offering concrete advice on labor, justice, and moral conduct. It "opens with moral remonstrances, hammered home in every way that Hesiod can think of." The Stoics offered ethical advice "on the notion of eudaimonia—of well-being, welfare, flourishing."

== Origins of self help ==
The hyphenated compound word "self-help" often appeared in the 1800s in a legal context, referring to the doctrine that a party in a dispute has the right to use lawful means on their initiative to remedy a wrong.

Some consider the self-help movement to have been inaugurated by George Combe's Constitution (1828), which advocated personal responsibility and the possibility of naturally sanctioned self-improvement through education or proper self-control.

In 1841, an essay by Ralph Waldo Emerson, entitled Compensation, was published suggesting "every man in his lifetime needs to thank his faults" and "acquire habits of self-help" as "our strength grows out of our weakness." Samuel Smiles (1812–1904) published the first explicitly "self-help" book, titled Self-Help, in 1859. Its opening sentence: "Heaven helps those who help themselves", provides a variation of "God helps them that help themselves", the oft-quoted maxim that had also appeared previously in Benjamin Franklin's Poor Richard's Almanack (1733–1758).

50 Self-Help Classics by Tom Butler-Bowdon is a survey of the self-help literature from Samuel Smiles and Benjamin Franklin to Anthony Robbins and Brene Brown.

== Early 20th century ==
In 1902, James Allen published As a Man Thinketh, which proceeds from the conviction that "a man is literally what he thinks, his character being the complete sum of all his thoughts." Noble thoughts, the book maintains, make for a noble person, while lowly thoughts make for a miserable person. Napoleon Hill's Think and Grow Rich (1937) described the use of repeated positive thoughts to attract happiness and wealth by tapping into an "Infinite Intelligence".

In 1936, Dale Carnegie further developed the genre with How to Win Friends and Influence People. Having failed in several careers, Carnegie became fascinated with success and its link to self-confidence, and his books have since sold over 50 million copies.

== The market ==
Group and corporate attempts to help people help themselves have created a self-help marketplace, with Large Group Awareness Trainings (LGATs) and psychotherapy systems represented. These offer more-or-less prepackaged solutions to instruct people seeking their betterment, just as "the literature of self-improvement directs the reader to familiar frameworks... what the French fin de siècle social theorist Gabriel Tarde called 'the grooves of borrowed thought'."

A subgenre of self-help book series exists, such as the for Dummies guides and The Complete Idiot's Guide to..., that are varieties of how-to books.

In contemporary capitalist societies, self-help has become an expansive industries that increases awareness of various capacities and qualities that people must supposedly improve in order to be more emotionally resilient, happy, or successful. In this dynamic, self-help authors and teachers do not only offer services for existing problems, but also participate in shaping public demand and niche markets for self-improvement. The term "well-being entrepreneur" has been suggested to capture this process, referring to "charismatic agents who not only navigate but also actively shape the historically evolving conceptions of 'well- being', establishing dynamic projects that synthesize elements of self-cultivation, political identification, and commercial interests." Well-being entrepreneurs use multiple ideas, fashions, and methods to define the meanings of "well-being" and produce tools that they offer for market exchange. Often, these individuals are people who themselves experience with various methods of self-improvement.

=== Statistics ===
At the start of the 21st century, "the self-improvement industry, inclusive of books, seminars, audio and video products, and personal coaching, [was] said to constitute a 2.48-billion dollars-a-year industry" in the United States alone. By 2006, research firm Marketdata estimated the "self-improvement" market in the U.S. as worth more than US$9 billion—including infomercials, mail-order catalogs, holistic institutes, books, audio cassettes, motivation-speaker seminars, the personal coaching market, and weight-loss and stress-management programs. Market data projected that the total market size would grow to over US$11 billion by 2008. In 2013 Kathryn Schulz examined "an $11 billion industry".

=== Self-help and professional service delivery ===
Self-help and mutual-help are very different from—though they may complement—aid by professionals.

Conflicts can and do arise on that interface, however, with some professionals considering that, for example, "the twelve-step approach encourages a kind of contemporary version of 19th-century amateurism or enthusiasm in which self-examination and very general social observations are enough to draw rather large conclusions."

== Research ==
The rise of self-help culture led to boundary disputes with other approaches and disciplines. Some would object to their classification as "self-help" literature, as with "Deborah Tannen's denial of the self-help role of her books" to maintain her academic credibility, aware of the danger that "writing a book that becomes a popular success...all but ensures that one's work will lose its long-term legitimacy."

Placebo effects can never be wholly discounted. Careful studies of "the power of subliminal self-help tapes... showed that their content had no real effect... But that's not what the participants thought." "If they thought they'd listened to a self-esteem tape (even though half the labels were wrong), they felt that their self-esteem had gone up. No wonder people keep buying subliminal tapes: even though the tapes don't work, people think they do."

Much of the self-help industry may be thought of as part of the "skin trades. People need haircuts, massage, dentistry, wigs and glasses, sociology and surgery, love and advice."—a skin trade, "not a profession and a science". Its practitioners thus function as "part of the personal service industry rather than as mental health professionals." While "there is no proof that twelve-step programs 'are superior to any other intervention in reducing alcohol dependence or alcohol-related problems'," at the same time it is clear that "there is something about 'groupishness' itself which is curative." Thus for example "smoking increases mortality risk by a factor of just 1.6, while social isolation does so by a factor of 2.0... suggest[ing] an added value to self-help groups such as Alcoholics Anonymous as surrogate communities."

Some psychologists advocate for positive psychology, and explicitly embrace an empirical self-help philosophy. "[T]he role of positive psychology is to become a bridge between the ivory tower and the main street—between the rigor of academe and the fun of the self-help movement." They aim to refine the self-improvement field by intentionally increasing scientifically sound research and well-engineered models. The division of focus and methodologies has produced several sub-fields, in particular: general positive psychology, focusing primarily on studying psychological phenomenon and effects; and personal effectiveness, focusing primarily on analysis, design, and implementation of qualitative personal growth. The latter of these includes intentionally training new patterns of thought and feeling. As business strategy communicator Don Tapscott puts it, "Why not courses that emphasize designing a great brain?... The design industry is something done to us. I'm proposing we each become designers. But I suppose 'I love the way she thinks' could take on new meaning."

Both self-talk—the propensity to engage in verbal or mental self-directed conversation and thought—and social support can be used as instruments of self-improvement, often via empowering action-promoting messages. Psychologists designed experiments to shed light on how self-talk can result in self-improvement. Research has shown that people prefer second-person pronouns over first-person pronouns when engaging in self-talk to achieve goals, regulate their behavior, thoughts, or emotions, and facilitate performance.

Self-talk also plays an important role in regulating emotions under social stress. People who use non-first-person language tend to exhibit a higher level of visual distance during the process of introspection, indicating that using non-first-person pronouns and one's own name may result in enhanced self-distancing. This form of self-help can enhance people's ability to regulate their thoughts, feelings, and behavior under social stress, which would lead them to appraise social-anxiety-provoking events in more challenging and less threatening terms.

== Criticism ==
Scholars have targeted many self-help claims as misleading and incorrect. In 2005, Steve Salerno portrayed the American self-help movement—he uses the acronym SHAM: the Self-Help and Actualization Movement—not only as ineffective in achieving its goals but also as socially harmful. "Salerno says that 80 percent of self-help and motivational customers are repeat customers and they keep coming back whether the program worked for them or not." Another critic pointed out that with self-help books "supply increases the demand… The more people read them, the more they think they need them… more like an addiction than an alliance."

Self-help writers have been described as working "in the area of the ideological, the imagined, the narrativized… although a veneer of scientism permeates the[ir] work, there is also an underlying armature of moralizing."

Christopher Buckley in his book God Is My Broker asserts: "The only way to get rich from a self-help book is to write one".

Gerald Rosen raised concerns that psychologists were promoting untested self-help books with exaggerated claims rather than conducting studies that could advance the effectiveness of these programs to help the public. Rosen noted the potential benefits of self-help but cautioned that good intentions were not sufficient to assure the efficacy and safety of self-administered instructional programs. Rosen and colleagues observed that many psychologists promote untested self-help programs rather than contributing to the meaningful advancement of self-help.

From a sociological perspective, self-help is often criticized for inculcating a model of a self-reliant and precarious worker-citizen who does not rely on state support and contributes to a productive labor-force. Self-help hence promotes and globalizes a capitalist version of individualism and personal development, producing new anxieties while also enabling people to imagine and simulate (through reading, workshops, training) their desired ideals of personhood.

== In the media ==
Kathryn Schulz suggests that "the underlying theory of the self-help industry is contradicted by the self-help industry’s existence".

=== Parodies and fictional analogies ===
The self-help world has become the target of parodies. Walker Percy's odd genre-busting Lost in the Cosmos has been described as "a parody of self-help books, a philosophy textbook, and a collection of short stories, quizzes, diagrams, thought experiments, mathematical formulas, made-up dialogue".

Al Franken's self-help guru persona Stuart Smalley was a ridiculous recurring feature on Saturday Night Live in the early 1990s.

In their 2006 book Secrets of The SuperOptimist, authors W.R. Morton and Nathaniel Whitten revealed the concept of "super optimism" as a humorous antidote to the overblown self-help book category.

In his comedy special Complaints and Grievances (2001), George Carlin observes that there is "no such thing" as self-help: anyone looking for help from someone else does not technically get "self" help; and one who accomplishes something without help did not need help to begin with.

In Margaret Atwood's semi-satiric dystopia Oryx and Crake, university literary studies have declined to the point that the protagonist, Snowman, is instructed to write his thesis on self-help books as literature; more revealing of the authors and of the society that produced them than genuinely helpful.

== See also ==
- Arete
- Conduct book
- Internal locus of control
- Law of attraction (New Thought)
- List of twelve-step groups
- Live in the Moment
- Manifestation
- Mutual aid society
- Mutual self-help housing
- New Thought Movement
- Outline of self
- Personal development
- Preschool education
- Self-help groups for mental health
- Self (psychology)
- Self-sustainability
- Self-taught
- Selfishness
- The Secret (2006 film)
- Think and Grow Rich
- Twelve-step program
