= No Way to Treat a First Lady =

2002 novel by Christopher Buckley

- Author: Christopher Buckley
- Language: English
- Genre: Satire
- Publisher: Random House
- Publication date: 2002
- Publication place: United States
- Media type: Print
- Pages: 288 pp
- ISBN: 0-375-50734-5
- OCLC: 49874905
- Dewey Decimal: 813/.54 21
- LC Class: PS3552.U3394 N6 2002

No Way to Treat a First Lady is a satirical novel by Christopher Buckley, first published in 2002. The novel follows the trial of Elizabeth Tyler MacMann, a fictional First Lady accused of murdering her husband, the President of the United States.

== Plot ==
The President of the United States and Hollywood bombshell Babette Van Anka are carrying on an extramarital affair in the White House. After a night of cheating, the president is confronted by his wife, Beth MacMann. The two get into a fight, during which she throws a historic Paul Revere spittoon at the president. The spittoon strikes the President in the head and it is alleged he later dies from the injuries.

The case is instantly declared the "Trial of the Millennium". The first lady decides that in order to win the case, she must hire the most expensive and unscrupulous attorney in Washington. The attorney who fits the bill, Boyce Baylor, happens to be her former lover from law school.

Baylor accepts her case and the trial becomes a media circus, with most of the media instantly concluding that the First Lady is guilty. Baylor's courtroom theatrics are planned to impress the court of public opinion as much as the jury. Incessant media coverage of the trial smothers attempts of the new President to accomplish anything serious.

Baylor and MacMann rekindle their long-lost love affair, but Baylor's shenanigans soon find him barred from the courtroom. The trial appears lost until Van Anka confesses under oath that she had secretly administered a large dose of Viagra to the president. An autopsy confirmed that the Viagra overdose was the cause of death.

MacMann is declared not guilty. She and Baylor have a baby which, coincidentally, weighs the same amount as the spittoon. The media is quick to declare that they believed the first lady was innocent all along.

== Characters ==
- Elizabeth Tyler MacMann – First Lady of the United States. On trial for murdering her cheating husband.
- Kenneth Kemble MacMann – the former President of the United States.
- Babette Van Anka – an air-headed movie star who had an affair with the president.
- Boyce Baylor – a "$1,000 an hour" attorney, hired to represent the first lady. Also, her former lover.
- Nick Naylor – a recurring character in Buckley novels, most well known as the tobacco lobbyist in Thank You for Smoking. He does public relations work for Van Anka during the trial
- Harold Farkley – the vice-president who becomes president upon MacMann's death. Farkley's attempts to govern are constantly overshadowed by the media-circus surrounding the trial.

== Similarities to past presidencies ==
The book is considered a satire of the Bill Clinton–Monica Lewinsky scandal which consumed much of Bill Clinton's second term as president, with legal antics, massive media coverage and spin control. Like Hillary Clinton, Elizabeth MacMann met her husband, the future president, at law school. MacMann is criticized for being overly ambitious and her husband's affairs became a source of embarrassment. Buckley's real target, however, is media coverage of such events – "O. J. and the Clinton scandals rolled into one."

The book also has "hints" of the Kennedy presidency.
