= Fern Holland =

American lawyer

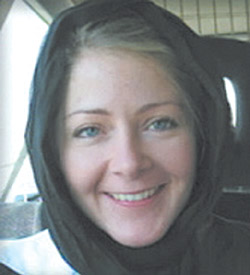
Fern Leona Holland

Fern Leona Holland (August 5, 1970 – March 9, 2004) was an American lawyer who was killed in the Iraq conflict that began in 2003. Holland died on March 9, 2004, while working for the Coalition Provisional Authority (CPA) in Iraq.

== Professional work ==
Holland was born in Oklahoma in 1970. After birth she lived in Bluejacket, Oklahoma, which is a small town between Vinita and Miami, Oklahoma. In 1992, she graduated from the University of Oklahoma. In 1996, she graduated from the University of Tulsa College of Law. After graduation, she worked at two law firms in Tulsa before joining the Peace Corps and traveling to Namibia.

In July 2003, Fern was hired by the United States Agency for International Development (USAID) to investigate human rights abuses under Saddam Hussein's regime. She was part of that agency's Abuse Prevention Unit, whose purpose is to protect victims of abuse occurring during times of war or conflict. At the conclusion of her tour with USAID, she was retained by the Coalition Provisional Authority to help Iraqis establish a democratic form of government.

== Death ==
Holland, American press officer and former Marine Corps lieutenant colonel Robert J. Zangas, and their Iraqi translator Salwa Ourmashi were shot in their car on a road near Karbala on March 9, 2004. Their killers wore Iraqi police uniforms. According to reports, she and Zangas were the first American civilians working for the CPA to be killed in Iraq, The New York Times Magazine reported that she was intentionally targeted for murder by those threatened by her empowerment of women; the interviews also reflect that for many CPA staff this was a turning point in the war when Western civilians could no longer travel without guns.

In 2006, the New York Times reported that federal investigators are investigating what happened to hundreds of thousands of dollars in cash issued by American authorities to Ms. Holland and Robert Zangas. American investigators are trying to determine whether that money was stolen as part of a web of bribery, kickbacks, theft and conspiracy that they have laid out in a series of indictments and court papers. No suspicion for the missing money has fallen on Ms. Holland or Mr. Zangas. Investigators tracing the flow of the cash to Ms. Holland and Mr. Zangas are looking at the possibility that others took advantage of the deaths to steal additional money.

=== Legacy ===
The novel Florence of Arabia by Christopher Buckley includes an homage to Holland in its acknowledgments.

In 2005, Holland was named Oklahoman of the Year.

The Fern L. Holland Award, sponsored by the University of Oklahoma Student Affairs and Delta Gamma Fraternity (of which Fern was a member), is a $1,000 annual cash award recognizing a full-time undergraduate woman enrolled in the University of Oklahoma acting in the spirit of Fern Holland: a desire to make a significant difference in the world in areas such as democracy, human rights, women's issues or leadership.

Since 2004 Vital Voices Global Partnership has annually given the Fern Holland Award in tribute to Fern's legacy. The award honors a leader who braves risks to promote peace and defend the human rights of a targeted or vulnerable community.

In 2019, U.S. Representative Seth Moulton established the Fern Holland Fellowship. This first-of-its-kind program seeks to diversify the foreign policy community and is awarded to three Pell Grant eligible entry-level professionals annually. Fellows receive an in-depth look into a career of public service and advise Representative Moulton and his foreign policy staff on key issues.
