= Supreme Court of the United States in fiction =

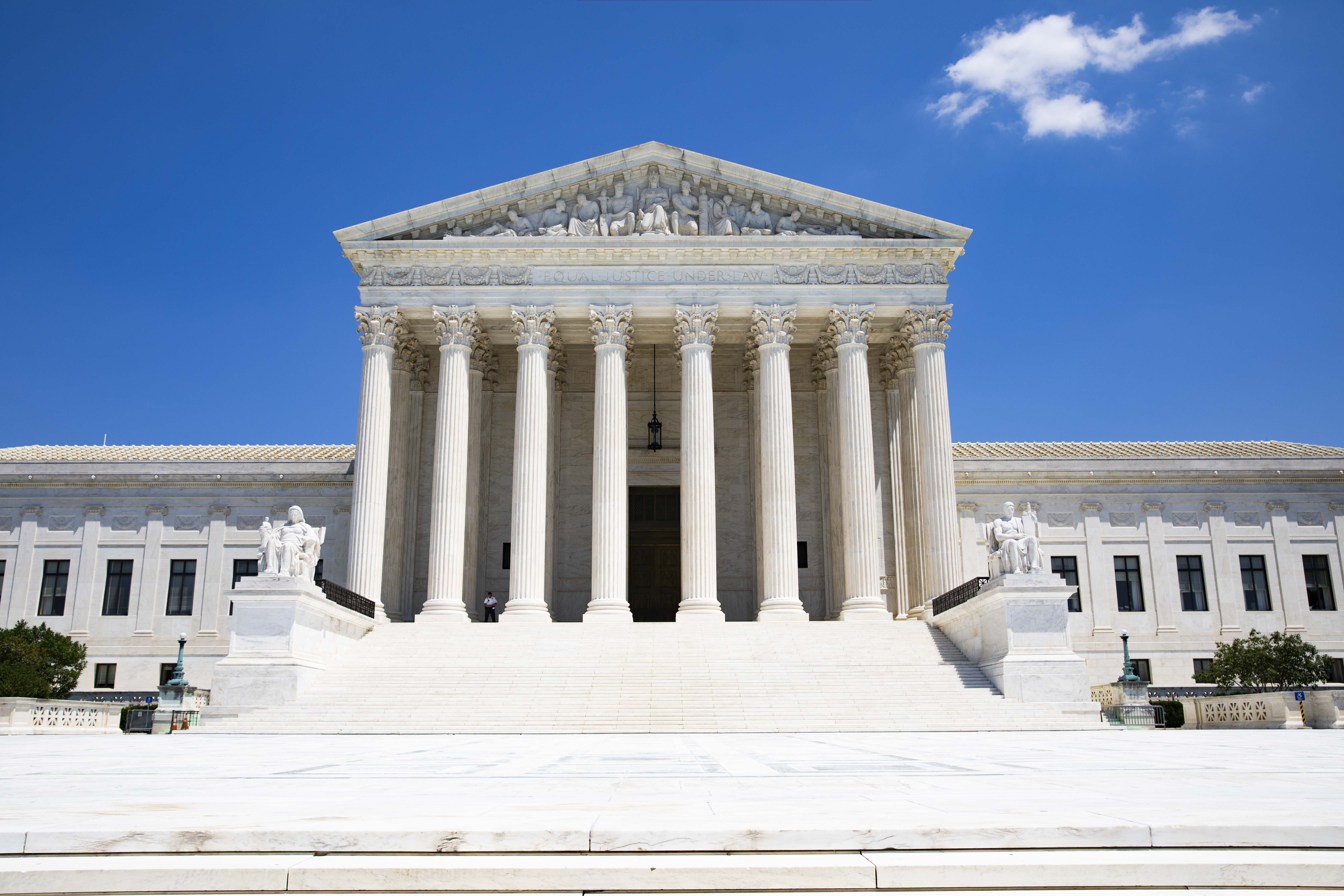
The U.S. Supreme Court Building, current home of the Supreme Court, which opened in 1935, has been described as having "an air of mystery" that makes it a good location to set fiction

Like many institutions that draw public interest, the Supreme Court of the United States has frequently been depicted in fiction, often in the form of legal drama. While early depictions of the Supreme Court in fiction tended to be reverential, over time depictions became more critical and melodramatic. In some instances, real decisions rendered by real courts are dramatized, as in Gideon's Trumpet and the seminal trial in The People vs. Larry Flynt. Other depictions are purely fictional, but center on realistic issues that come before the court. Despite the comparative dearth of material on the Supreme Court in popular culture as compared to other branches of government, such depictions are "the primary source of the public's knowledge about the legal system as a whole, including the Supreme Court".

== Reactions to different media ==
Court-centered fiction has been distinctively more successful in some media than others. For example, author Anthony Franze explained in an essay in The Strand the allure of writing fictional novels set in the Supreme Court, noting that as a location it has "an air of mystery", as well as interesting characters, a unique language, history, and tradition, and that it provides "a backdrop of unparalleled stakes".

On the other hand, television series centered on dramatizing the happenings of the court have proven to be short-lived, and have tended to receive overall negative critical reaction. One reason that has been suggested is that the Supreme Count is a court of appeals, whereas most legal drama portrays trial courts. Appeals may appear "bookish" in contrast to the theatrical storytelling of trials, especially juries. Furthermore, American audiences are not very knowledgeable about or interested in the Supreme Court.

== Literature ==
Fictional accounts of the Supreme Court began with literary works. Of these it has been noted by Maxwell Bloomfield that "the earliest glimpses of the Court in American fiction occur as set pieces in satirical travelogues", with characters visiting the United States Capitol (which initially housed the Supreme Court), wherein "the furniture is described in greater detail than the Justices, who are pictured as emblems of republican virtue: aged, wise, and serene beings who are capable of listening to boring arguments for days without murmur". Bloomfield describes as representative of these works the 1822 George Watterston comic novel The L— Family at Washington; or, A Winter in the Metropolis, which provides descriptions of the courtroom and Justices Marshall and Washington, stating of the court, "its organization is as perfect as it can be, so far as it concerns its independence, the most important and excellent principle in the constitution of all judiciary establishments". An uncharacteristically negative depiction for its time was presented in the 1836 Nathaniel Beverley Tucker novel, The Partisan Leader, set in 1849 and depicting a corrupt Martin Van Buren using "the servile Judge [Philip] Baker of the Supreme Court" as a tool through which to exercise power. Early depictions of the court demonstrated a lack of knowledge of its procedures and internal administration.

This was generally the tenor of mentions of the court in literature throughout the 19th century, a notable exception being the 1897 novel Waiting for the Signal by Henry O. Morris, in which the court is criticized as a tool for the wealthy to exercise power. In the novel, "through its subservience to corporate wealth the Court unwittingly starts a revolution" by deeming labor organizations illegal under the Sherman Antitrust Act, leading to the writing of a new constitution. In 1901, the court decided the Insular Cases, issuing convoluted and deeply divided opinions with the net effect that the Constitution did not follow the flag. American journalist and humorist Finley Peter Dunne, through his cartoon character, Mr. Dooley, took advantage of the opportunity to puncture the court's ivory-tower reputation, writing "no matther whether th' constitution follows th' flag or not, th' Supreme Court follows th' iliction returns. The 1907 novel The Radical, by Isaac Kahn Friedman depicted a justice as having been "inexorably conditioned by his socioeconomic background" to find laws prohibiting child labor unconstitutional. The 1910 Robert Herrick novel, A Life for a Life, "portrayed the Justices as ancient logic-machines, programmed to respond only to the legal formulae of a preindustrial age".

A fictionalized version of the Supreme Court features in the 1931 musical, Of Thee I Sing, with a score by George Gershwin, lyrics by Ira Gershwin and a book by George S. Kaufman and Morrie Ryskind, which was the first American musical with a consistently satirical tone, Congress, the Court, the Presidency, and the democratic process itself were all targets of this satire, prompting original stars William Gaxton and Victor Moore to wonder if they would face government repercussions for their portrayals of President Wintergreen and Vice President Throttlebottom. In the show, fictional President John Wintergreen wins a landslide election after eschewing a beauty pageant winner to marry a girl named Mary, who bakes delicious corn muffins. The Chief Justice presides over the wedding ceremony, and just after he has pronounced John and Mary man and wife, the pageant winner interrupts the proceedings to insist she is the one he should have married. The Supreme Court rules that Mary's corn muffins are more important than justice in this matter. The court is later shown as having the duty of announcing the sex of the Wintergreen's twin children.

In the 1937 musical, I'd Rather Be Right, with a book by Moss Hart and George S. Kaufman and lyrics by Lorenz Hart, President Franklin D. Roosevelt attempts to balance the budget to help Peggy Jones (Joy Hodges) and her boyfriend Phil (Austin Marshall), who needs a raise in order for them to get married. The Supreme Court justices intercede and declare each of Roosevelt's attempted solutions unconstitutional, ultimately declaring even the constitution itself unconstitutional, and deeming the court itself to be the only thing still constitutional.

Several novels and plays produced in the 1960s and 1970s presented character studies of fictional Supreme Court justices, including the 1963 Andrew Tully novel, Supreme Court, the 1966 William Woolfolk novel, Opinion of the Court, the 1972 Jay Broad play, A Conflict of Interest, the 1973 Henry Denker novel, A Place for the Mighty, the 1979 Jerome Lawrence and Robert E. Lee play, First Monday in October, and the 1979 Walter F. Murphy novel, The Vicar of Christ. Maxwell Bloomfield describes the "common format" of these works as follows:

A new justice is appointed to the Court. He or she meets the brethren, each of whom expresses a clearly articulated juristic philosophy and displays some distinguishing personal eccentricity. The physical and intellectual traits of living Justices are carefully scrambled, so that recognizable liberals come out sounding like conservatives, and vice-versa. The new appointee finds himself immersed at once in a series of dramatic cases. These generally involve recent civil rights issues that have been widely discussed in the media. After hearing oral argument the Justices deliberate gravely, even portentously, with one another.

In The Vicar of Christ, the main character, Declan Walsh, follows a particularly improbable course. Beginning as a decorated war hero in the Korean War, he" becomes successively dean of a law school, chief justice of the Supreme Court, a Trappist, monk, and finally pope". In addition to the legal and operational dimensions, Bloomfield notes that these works tend to introduce some kind of romantic or sexual tension or scandal that humanizes the judges, and that the stories often involve judges at odds coming together to defend the institution of the court from external criticism.

More recent literature involving the Supreme Court has tended to come in the genre of legal thrillers and murder mysteries, such as Murder in the Supreme Court (1982), by Margaret Truman, The Pelican Brief (1992), by John Grisham, and The Tenth Justice (1997), by Brad Meltzer. These works tend to begin with the murder of someone connected to the Court—typically a justice or an important Court employee. As the mystery is unraveled, this turns out to be part of a much larger conspiracy to influence the outcome of a decision with national implications. The Pelican Brief in particular popularized the concept that nefarious forces might plot to remove a justice from the court for the purpose of changing the outcome of a matter before it. Christopher Buckley, in his 2008 novel, Supreme Courtship, presents a less common genre, a romantic comedy in which "his protagonist, the folksy television judge Pepper Cartwright, not only joins the Supreme Court but also marries its unhappy Chief Justice, Declan Hardwether, giving the novel the traditional comedic ending of marriage".

== Film ==
Among the earliest films with a focus on a justice of the Supreme Court is the 1942 film, The Talk of the Town, starring Cary Grant, Jean Arthur, and Ronald Colman. In the film, Colman plays distinguished law professor Michael Lightcap, who has just learned that he is to be nominated to the Supreme Court. Grant plays Leopold Dilg a radical fugitive who takes refuge at the home of Jean Arthur's character, Nora Shelley, which is being rented by Lightcap. The film sets up a comedic love triangle with Dilg and Lightcap competing for Shelley's affection, and culminates with Lightcap being appointed to the court. An examination of the film in the context of reviewing court-related fiction notes that in addition to the romantic contest between the male leads, there is a philosophical one between Lightcap as "a Supreme Court nominee who views the law as a rational construct distinct from what he dismisses as the 'small emotions' of ordinary life, and Leopold Dilg, a vibrant, iconoclastic activist who believes that Lightcap must be 'thawed' before he can be trusted to join the Court". This emotional reform is demonstrated when Shelley visits Lightcap in his chambers and he tells her that his dream of 20 years has been realized, and suggests that Shelley should marry Dilg. Both Dilg and Shelley attend court at the first seating of Lightcap as an associate justice.

The 1981 film version of the play, First Monday in October, presented a story about the first woman on the Supreme Court. The film came out the year Sandra Day O'Connor became the first woman on the court. The film was based on a Broadway production which had opened in 1978, and starred Jane Alexander as the central Justice Ruth Loomis. In the film, "the conservative new appointee Ruth Loomis and the venerable liberal lion Dan Snow, spar over the law", but "appear to be sliding toward a romantic relationship in the manner of conventional Hollywood comedies". The film, however, "chooses instead to have Ruth and Dan discover that their jurisprudential disagreements are a vital source of judicial strength rather than a prelude to romance", with Snow convincing Loomis not to resign from the court over unethical conduct revealed to have been engaged in by her deceased husband.

In 1980, the workings of the court were portrayed in the television film, Gideon's Trumpet, dramatizing the case of Gideon v. Wainwright, which secured the right to counsel for the indigent. A 1991 television film, Separate but Equal, "celebrated the Court's decisions ending segregation" in the 1954 case of Brown v. Board of Education, and the 1996 film, The People vs. Larry Flynt portrays the court in a positive light in its decision protecting the First Amendment rights of pornographer Larry Flynt in parodying Jerry Falwell. The court is thus presented as "defender of the Constitutional rights of even unpopular causes or despicable characters".

The 2013 HBO television film, Muhammad Ali's Greatest Fight, provided a partly fictionalized depiction of the Supreme Court's deliberations in the case of Clay v. United States, in which the court threw out the criminal conviction of Muhammad Ali for refusing to report for induction into the United States military during the Vietnam War. The film was based on the 2000 book Muhammad Ali's Greatest Fight: Cassius Clay vs. the United States of America by Howard Bingham and Max Wallace. Hank Stuever of The Washington Post commented that the film, focused as it was on the behind-the-scenes legal discussion of the Supreme Court's justices and law clerks, and depicting one of Justice Harlan's law clerks (a character that was "a fictional composite of several clerks") as playing a central role in the court's decision to free Ali, was at times "too much like a substandard episode of The Paper Chase" and "more Wikipedia entry than story, as characters speak to one another in long paragraphs of legal exposition". The Post did have positive comments about the lead performances of Christopher Plummer as Justice John Marshall Harlan II, and Frank Langella as Chief Justice Warren E. Burger. Christopher Howse of The Daily Telegraph said the film "was worth watching in the comfort of the home, but if it had been shown in a cinema, it would hardly have been worth stirring from the fireside for". Mary McNamara of the Los Angeles Times also commented on the excellent performances of the cast, while concluding that "[t]he legal wrangling of eight old white men behind closed doors simply pales in comparison" to Ali's part of the story.

Loving is a 2016 American biographical romantic drama film which tells the story of Richard and Mildred Loving, the plaintiffs in the 1967 U.S. Supreme Court (the Warren Court) decision Loving v. Virginia, which invalidated state laws prohibiting interracial marriage.

The 2018 film, On the Basis of Sex, depicts the circuit court ruling in Moritz v. Commissioner, which the Supreme Court refused to take up. The final scene shows Supreme Court Justice Ruth Bader Ginsburg climbing the steps of the Supreme Court building.

== Television ==
=== Supreme Court-centered TV series ===
Unlike novels and films presenting accounts of the Supreme Court, television series focusing on it as a subject have failed to gain an audience, and have consequently been short-lived. Two television series presenting fictionalized versions of the Supreme Court debuted in 2002, First Monday and The Court. First Monday starred Joe Mantegna and James Garner, with Mantegna portraying a fictional Joseph Novelli, a moderate and potential swing vote recently appointed to a Supreme Court evenly divided between conservatives and liberals. Garner was the conservative Chief Justice. The series lasted for thirteen episodes before its cancellation. The Court starred Sally Field as newly appointed Justice Kate Nolan, depicted as struggling her way through the political aspects of her occupation. The Court was cancelled after three episodes, with several more produced but never aired. Both series, aired in the wake of the controversial 2000 Bush v. Gore decision, portrayed the court as divided between camps of differing political ideologies, and shaken up by a newly appointed justice at the center.

A 2010 series, Outlaw, starred Jimmy Smits as the fictional Cyrus Garza, a Supreme Court justice who resigns from the bench to start his own law firm, as a way to more directly promote the ends of justice. Much like its predecessors, the show was placed on hiatus after three of its eight produced episodes were broadcast, and was never brought back.

=== TV series with Supreme Court-related storylines ===
More successful fictional depictions of the Supreme Court have occurred as individual episodes of more acclaimed TV series, with appearances and storylines tailored to the tenor of the series. In courtroom drama series, this is typically in the form of cases culminating in arguments before the court. In political drama series, plotlines have tended to focus more on the appointment of justices as a political exercise, and on machinations involving the personal lives and predilictions of justices or nominees.

==== Boston Legal ====
In Boston Legal, Alan Shore and Denny Crane argue two cases before the Supreme Court during the series. In "The Court Supreme", Shore argues for overturning the death penalty sentence of a mentally handicapped man convicted of raping a young girl, which was based heavily on the 2008 case Kennedy v. Louisiana. In the series finale "Last Call", Shore returns to the Court to argue for Crane being allowed access to an experimental drug for Alzheimer's disease.

==== Designated Survivor ====
In the political thriller drama Designated Survivor, the majority of the Supreme Court is killed when the United States Capitol is destroyed in a terror attack in the pilot episode. In the episode The Ninth Seat (S01E17), President Tom Kirkman (Kiefer Sutherland) faces struggles when appointing the ninth and final member of the new Supreme Court, and elects to temporarily keep the Court at an even 8-member capacity. In the episode Run (S02E22) Chief Justice Peter Koeman (Keith Dinicol) warns President Kirkman to not have his staff try and influence court decisions.

==== House of Cards ====
In House of Cards (Season 3), President Frank Underwood (Kevin Spacey) is approached by Associate Justice Robert Jacobs (Jonathan Hogan) who requests he be allowed to retire due to having started to develop alzheimers. However, Underwood expresses his desire for Jacobs to remain on the court until he has passed groundbreaking job creation legislation. Underwood later tries to discourage his political rival, Solicitor General Heather Dunbar (Elizabeth Marvel) from running against him by offering her Jacob's place on the court, but she announces her candidacy before he can formally nominate her. Another named member of the court is Associate Justice Moretti (Kris Andrews). The court is shown to be composed of three women and six men, two of whom are African-American.

==== How To Get Away With Murder ====
How to Get Away with Murder (Season 4) features a Supreme Court session in episode 13, in which the protagonist, Annalise Keating (Viola Davis), brings a class action suit against the Federal Government for not providing effective public legal counsel, thus violating the 6th Amendment. This episode is also part of the crossover event between the same-universe TV show Scandal, and also features Olivia Pope (Kerry Washington). The court is composed of Chief Justice Peter Montgomery (Jesse D. Goins), Associate Justice Mark Spivey (Tom Irwin), Associate Justice Helen Bass (Cathy Ladman), Associate Justice Alberto Gutierrez (Ruben Pla), Associate Justice Strickland (Denis Arndt) and two other unnamed justices.

==== Madam Secretary ====
Madam Secretary (Seasons 2, 3 and 4) features occasional appearances of Chief Justice Wilbourne (Morgan Freeman), a close friend of Secretary of State Elizabeth McCord (Tea Leoni). Freeman also serves as an executive producer for the show. The name is retconned, with Freeman being credited as "Chief Justice Frowley" in his first appearance.

==== Picket Fences ====
In the Picket Fences episode "May It Please the Court", broadcast on 18 November 1994, defense attorney Douglas Wambaugh (played by Fyvush Finkel) and District Attorney John Littleton (played by Don Cheadle) engaged in oral arguments before the Court (with actors playing the real justices); Supreme Court oral argument veteran Alan Dershowitz guest starred as himself, advising Wambaugh on strategy for addressing the Court. The case dealt with the admissibility of a murderer's confession.

==== Political Animals ====
Political Animals (2012 miniseries) features Associate Justice Diane Nash (Vanessa Redgrave), the first openly gay member of the court. She serves as a friend and mentor to Secretary of State Elaine Barrish (Sigourney Weaver).

==== Salvation ====
In season two of the suspense sci-fi drama series Salvation, there is a politically related Supreme Court subplot. After the brief incapacitation and later reinstatement of President Pauline Mackenzie (Tovah Feldshuh), Vice President Monroe Bennett (Sasha Roiz), who previously served as Acting President, argues his power was illegally revoked and submits a claim at the Supreme Court. The court is split 4-4 when a suicide bomber attacks the United States Supreme Court Building, incapacitating Chief Justice Martin Cheng (Hiro Kanagawa), the remaining swing vote. Cheng later recovers, and casts his vote 5–4 in favour of Mackenzie. Another named judge is Associate Justice Praeger (Corina Akeson).

==== Scandal ====
The series Scandal (Season 2) features Associate Justice Verna Thornton (Debra Mooney) as a primary antagonist for the first half of the second season. Aware that President Fitzgerald Thomas Grant III (Tony Goldwyn) ascended to the presidency through voter fraud in Defiance County, Ohio she attempted to have him assassinated. Suffering with terminal cancer, she was pressured by Vice President Sally Langston (Kate Burton) to give up her seat, which she refused. She is eventually suffocated in hospital by President Grant so she cannot reveal the truth about his election, with her death being made to look like the result of the cancer.

==== Shooter ====
The drama series Shooter (based on the 2007 film of the same name) contains a Supreme Court related subplot in Season 3. A secretive government cabal named Atlas pushes for Judge Ray Brooks (Michael O'Neill) to be appointed the next Chief Justice, as they can manipulate him to be their swing vote with evidence of war crimes he committed whilst serving in the Vietnam War. When the conspiracy is discovered, several members of the court are targeted, including Associate Justice Gibson (Rhea Perlman) and Associate Justice Romero Dominguez (Castulo Guerra).

==== The Outer Limits ====
In the 1995 Syfy science fiction revival series The Outer Limits, the episode Final Appeal (S06E021) focuses on the Supreme Court in the year 2076. They are hearing the final appeal of the conviction of Dr. Theresa Evans (Amanda Plummer), a time traveller for whom the death penalty is sought for bringing advanced technology into the world after such technology has been banished. In this future setting, there are only 5 justices: Chief Justice Haden Wainwright (Charlton Heston), Associate Justice Earl Clayton (Robert Loggia), Associate Justice Gretchen Parkhurst (Cicely Tyson), Associate Justice Kendall Woods (Swoosie Kurtz) and Associate Justice Oliver Harbinson (Hal Holbrook). The court ultimately votes 3–2 to acquit Evans.

==== The West Wing ====
The West Wing involved frequent discussions or depictions of fictional past and present Supreme Court justices. Two episodes ("The Short List" in 1999, and "Celestial Navigation" in 2000) center on the nomination of "Roberto Mendoza," played by Edward James Olmos, as the first Hispanic Justice. At the opening of the episode "Celestial Navigation", Mendoza has been arrested for drunk driving and resisting arrest. Sam Seaborn stresses that Mendoza doesn't drink alcohol, telling C. J. Cregg that Mendoza was arrested for "driving while being Hispanic". The sergeant on duty tells Sam that Mendoza's driving was faulty, and that he wasn't sure that Mendoza hadn't been drinking alcohol. Sam responds by informing the officers that Mendoza has a chronic illness that would render any significant drinking fatal. Mendoza expresses frustration at how he'd been treated by the police, having been searched and handcuffed in front of his wife and nine-year-old son. Mendoza vowed to use the criminal justice system to acquit himself, instead of letting the White House get him out, but is persuaded that he could make a much bigger difference on the Supreme Court, and that he would be unable to be confirmed by the U.S. Senate if the story circulates. Mendoza agrees to be released and the officers' apologize to Mendoza and to his son, with the incident remaining off the record.

Writing for the Daily Bruin, Alex Driscoll praised the focus on Mendoza's being racially profiled. Driscoll writes that while Mendoza was released quietly and quickly, many cases of a victim being racially profiled do not have the same outcome. She praises Sorkin for providing attention to the point that race can matter more than guilt or innocence in determining how a suspect is treated by police, and notes that most suspects in this case will not have powerful members of the U.S. government to bail them out, that forms of protest similar to Mendoza's refusing of a breathalyzer test have spread across the United States.

A third episode, "The Supremes" in 2004, dealt with the issue of preserving ideological balance on the Court. The President makes a deal with the Republican Congress to simultaneously appoint a very liberal judge "Evelyn Baker Lang" (played by Glenn Close) as the Court's first female Chief Justice, and a very conservative judge, "Christopher Mulready" (played by William Fichtner) as an Associate Justice. The 2000 episode "Take This Sabbath Day" also opened with a scene depicting the Court's main chamber.

==== Veep ====
The comedy series Veep (Season 6) sees former President Stuart Hughes nominated to a vacant position on the Supreme Court by President Laura Montez (Andrea Savage) after the death of Associate Justice Tenny. Hughes becomes the second person after William Howard Taft to serve as both President and as a Supreme Court justice.

==== Y: The Last Man ====
In the post-apocalyptic drama series Y: The Last Man, based on the comic book series of the same name, a mysterious cataclysmic event simultaneously kills every mammal with a Y chromosome. As a result, the judiciary is decimated, with the only surviving members of the Supreme Court being Associate Justice Nadine Gwyther, Associate Justice Dina Corrette and Associate Justice Oriana Landrith. It is implied that two surviving female Circuit Court Judges, Margaret Waldrie and Sondra Ongata, are promoted to partially fill the gaps caused by the death of male justices.
