= Thank You for Smoking =

2005 film by Jason Reitman

- Theatrical release poster
- Directed by: Jason Reitman
- Screenplay by: Jason Reitman
- Based on: Thank You for Smoking by Christopher Buckley
- Produced by: David O. Sacks
- Starring: Aaron Eckhart; Maria Bello; Cameron Bright; Adam Brody; Sam Elliott; Katie Holmes; David Koechner; Rob Lowe; William H. Macy; J. K. Simmons; Robert Duvall
- Cinematography: James Whitaker
- Edited by: Dana E. Glauberman
- Music by: Rolfe Kent
- Production companies: Room 9 Entertainment; ContentFilm
- Distributed by: Fox Searchlight Pictures
- Release dates: September 9, 2005 (TIFF); March 17, 2006 (United States)
- Running time: 92 minutes
- Country: United States
- Language: English
- Budget: $10 million
- Box office: $39.3 million

Thank You for Smoking is a 2005 American satirical black comedy film written and directed by Jason Reitman in his feature film director debut and starring Aaron Eckhart, based on the 1994 novel by Christopher Buckley. It follows the efforts of Big Tobacco's chief spokesman, Nick Naylor (Eckhart), who lobbies on behalf of cigarettes using heavy spin tactics while also trying to remain a role model for his 12-year-old son, played by Cameron Bright. Maria Bello, Adam Brody, Sam Elliott, Katie Holmes, Rob Lowe, David Koechner, William H. Macy, J. K. Simmons, and Robert Duvall appear in supporting roles.

Thank You for Smoking premiered at TIFF on September 9, 2005. The film was released by Fox Searchlight Pictures in a limited run on March 17, 2006, and had a wide release on April 14. It received largely positive reviews, with particular praise for its screenplay, humor, themes, and Eckhart's performance. As of 2007, the film had grossed a total of more than $39 million worldwide. The film was released on DVD in the US on October 3, 2006, and in the UK on January 8, 2007.

== Plot ==
Nick Naylor is a Big Tobacco spokesman using "research" from an institution of which he is vice-president, a tobacco lobby called the "Academy of Tobacco Studies". It claims there is no link between tobacco and lung disease. Naylor and his friends, firearm lobbyist Bobby Jay Bliss and alcohol lobbyist Polly Bailey, meet for lunch every week and jokingly call themselves the "Merchants of Death" or "The MOD Squad". As anti-tobacco campaigns mount and numbers of young smokers decline, Naylor's boss, B.R., sends Naylor to Los Angeles to bargain for cigarette product placement in upcoming movies. Naylor takes along his young son, Joey, in hopes of bonding with him. The next day, Naylor is sent to meet with Lorne Lutch, the cancer-stricken man who once played the Marlboro Man in cigarette ads and is now campaigning against cigarettes. As his son watches, Naylor successfully convinces Lutch to take a suitcase of money for his silence by playing on Lutch's principles and need to provide for his family.

Senator Ortolan Finistirre, one of Naylor's most vehement critics, promotes a bill to add a skull and crossbones POISON warning to cigarette packaging. As Naylor is about to appear before a U.S. Senate committee to fight the bill, he is kidnapped by a clandestine group and covered in nicotine patches. Awakening in a hospital, he learns he has survived due to his high nicotine tolerance from heavy smoking, but he is now hypersensitive to nicotine and can never smoke again. Meanwhile, Naylor is seduced by a young reporter named Heather Holloway into revealing secret information about his life and career. She makes it public via an exposé, criticizing his business activities and accusing him of training his son Joey to follow his amoral example. This results in negative PR for Naylor, which costs him his job.

After he hides out in his home for a few days, Naylor is visited by Joey who uses some of the debating skills his father taught him, which reminds Naylor of his own principles. Naylor apologizes to his friends in the MOD Squad and is inspired to take a new tactic. Naylor laments to the press about Holloway's ethics of using his private conversations with him after sex and goads Finistirre into allowing him to testify before the Senate committee. During the hearing, Naylor surprises everyone by admitting to the dangers of smoking but argues that public awareness is already high enough without extra warnings. He emphasizes consumer choice and responsibility and claims that if tobacco companies are guilty of tobacco-related deaths, then perhaps Finistirre's state of Vermont, as a major cheese producer, is likewise guilty of cholesterol-related deaths. When Finistirre attempts to regain control by demanding what Naylor would do when his son was 18 and wanted to smoke, Naylor simply replies that if his son wants to smoke then he'd buy him his first pack.

Although B.R. insists in a live interview that Naylor is still their chief spokesman, Naylor rejects the job on camera. It turns out to be a good move as Big Tobacco is settling claims of liability and the Academy of Tobacco Studies shuts down. Naylor also mentions Heather was humiliated upon being terminated by the paper for her article and has been reduced to a cub reporter handling weather on a local news station. Naylor supports his son's newfound interest in debating and opens a private lobbying firm. The MOD Squad continues to meet with new members who represent the fast-food, oil, and biohazard industries. Now Naylor runs an agency called Naylor Strategic Relations and consults for cellphone industry representatives concerned about claims that cellphones cause brain cancer. He narrates: "Michael Jordan plays ball. Charles Manson kills people. I talk. Everyone has a talent."

== Cast ==
- Aaron Eckhart as Nick Naylor, spokesman for the Academy of Tobacco Studies
- Maria Bello as Polly Bailey, spokeswoman for the alcohol industry
- Cameron Bright as Joey Naylor, Nick's son
- Adam Brody as Jack, Jeff Megall's assistant
- Sam Elliott as Lorne Lutch, the original Marlboro Man
- Katie Holmes as Heather Holloway, reporter for The Washington Probe
- David Koechner as Bobby Jay Bliss, spokesman for S.A.F.E.T.Y (Society for the Advancement of Firearms and Effective Training for Youth)
- Rob Lowe as Jeff Megall, Hollywood super-agent
- William H. Macy as Senator Ortolan Finistirre
- J. K. Simmons as B.R., Nick's boss
- Robert Duvall as the Captain, founder of the Academy for Tobacco Studies
- Kim Dickens as Jill Naylor, Nick's ex-wife
- Connie Ray as Pearl
- Todd Louiso as Ron Goode
- Marianne Muellerleile as Joey's school teacher
- Dennis Miller as himself
- Melora Hardin as Interviewer
- Daniel Travis as Brad, Jill's current partner

Director Jason Reitman asked many of his prospective actors and actresses to be in the film by writing each of them a personal letter. Every one of his first choices accepted his or her part and most thanked Reitman for his letter. Reitman was also able to persuade Eckhart, Holmes, Macy, and Lowe to sign on to the film with minimum pay.

== Production ==
Mel Gibson's Icon Productions bought the rights to Buckley's novel before its release. Initially, Gibson saw himself as starring as Nick Naylor in the adaptation. However, the satiric nature of the book meant the studio lacked a way to film it and the project lacked a usable script. Reitman became interested in heading an adaptation after reading the book, and independently wrote a draft for Icon executives after he discovered they owned the rights to the film. Reitman saw himself as a comic writer with a voice similar to Buckley's, and consciously attempted to maintain the satiric flavor of the book for his draft. The script was received favorably by Icon, and Gibson called Reitman to tell him how much he loved it. Over the next three years, the project languished because of a lack of financing and big studio interest, as most studios wanted Reitman to rewrite his script to include a more anti-smoking and uplifting ending. According to Reitman, studios wanted Naylor to have a change of heart by the film's end and repent for his past.

It was only after meeting David O. Sacks, who had made his fortune as the former COO of the Internet payment company PayPal, that Reitman found a financier for his script. A first-time producer, Sacks spent over a year trying to acquire the rights to the film from Icon. He financed most of the film's $8.5 million budget and let Reitman keep most of his original draft. The project marked Reitman's first feature-length film as a director, though he previously directed short films and commercials and had worked on the set of his father, director Ivan Reitman.

During the filming, Reitman made the conscious decision not to show any actual smoking of cigarettes. The only scenes that include smoking are older films the characters watch, such as when John Wayne lights up in Sands of Iwo Jima.

Before the film was screened at the Sundance Film Festival, internet rumors claimed that an extended nudity scene between Eckhart and Holmes had been cut down after pressure from Holmes' husband, Tom Cruise. Reitman and executives denied that such a scene had ever existed but welcomed the publicity it garnered for the film. Reitman later said that "Half the questions that I've been getting are thoughtful questions about the moral of lobbying and how does satire work. And the rest is just, 'Is there actually any nude footage out there?'"

Controversy also arose after the film was screened at the Toronto Film Festival. Thank You for Smoking was met with tremendous popular reception and afterward disputed claims emerged as to who had signed a distribution deal with Sacks. Fox Searchlight Pictures and Paramount Classics both issued competing press releases claiming that they had secured rights for the film's distribution. Sacks later claimed that he never reached a firm deal with Paramount, and noted that Fox Searchlight had offered $7 million for distribution, while Paramount Classics offered $6.7 million. Allegedly, Sacks called Paramount at 1:15 a.m. saying he was uncomfortable with their initial deal. Ruth Vitale, co-president of Paramount Classics, said "He can't resell the film" and noted "I can only think that because of his naiveté and inexperience he would do this."

Elon Musk is credited as executive producer of Thank You for Smoking. His participation was discussed during episode #1470 of the Joe Rogan Experience podcast with Musk as Rogan’s guest. It was also discussed during episode #49 of Lex Fridman's podcast.

Other members of the tight-knit and influential "PayPal Mafia" credited alongside Sacks and Musk as executive producers are Max Levchin and Peter Thiel (the Mafia's "don").

== Release ==
=== Critical reception ===
The film received mostly positive reviews from film critics. Film-review aggregator Rotten Tomatoes reports that 86% of 182 critics have given the film a positive review, with a rating average of 7.32/10. The site's general consensus is that "Loaded with delightfully unscrupulous characters and a witty, cynical script, Thank You For Smoking is a sharp satire with a brilliantly smarmy lead performance from Aaron Eckhart." Metacritic, which assigns a normalized rating out of 100 to reviews from film critics, has a rating score of 71 based on 36 reviews. Peter Travers of Rolling Stone describing it as "acutely hilarious" and gave the film 3.5 out of 4 stars. USA Today film critic Claudia Puig called it a "razor-sharp satire" that was "the wittiest dark comedy of the year thus far. It has appeal to all sides of the political spectrum." She praised the film for a "quirky and intelligent rarity that elicits wry smiles and hearty laughs alike" and compared it in tone to Election (1999). Kenneth Turan of the Los Angeles Times also favorably reviewed the film, calling it a "very smart and funny movie" that had been "shrewdly" adapted to film from novel.

The main contention most critics had with the film was its lack of continuity. Karina Longworth of Cinematical notes "Thank You for Smoking has a vague emotional arc, but narratively it plays out like a constellation of sitcom sketches, connected by the most tenuous threads of character evolution", while Empire observes "the problem's not so much with the movie's aim, as with the number of targets it's aiming at." While Thank You for Smoking the book was praised as a sharp criticism of both anti-smoking lobbyists and the tobacco industry, the film has received more mixed reviews on its satirical content. Steve Palopoli of Metro Silicon Valley writes that "no matter" how much the hype machine might hard-sell the idea that the movie "skewers both sides of the issue", "any child old enough to recognize Joe Camel can tell that underneath the sarcastic joking, this is a bitterly anti-smoking film." Palopoli goes on to say "the supposed case against the anti-smoking lobby has been reduced mostly to some limp jokes at the expense of William H. Macy's senator character, who is fervently against the tobacco lobby". Many felt the film's relatively sappy ending negated the slicker, darker tone of the book. The Washington Post's Desson Thomson thought that "as written and directed by Jason Reitman, Smoking is filtered too heavily with moral redemption."

Other reviewers criticized the film's overacting. Manohla Dargis of The New York Times notes "although he [Reitman] steers his cast through its paces with facility, he tends to oversell jokes that were already plenty loud in the book." The Hollywood Reporter wrote "While often entertaining, the film keeps hitting the same comic notes", and Salon said, "The actors here are entertaining enough to watch, even if they sometimes seem to be taking their mission (whatever they think it is) a bit too seriously."

=== Box office performance ===
Thank You for Smoking initially opened at the box office in the U.S. as a limited release in just five theaters, and grossed $262,923 in its debut weekend for an average of $52,584 per theater, making it one of the top 100 average gross per theater films of all time. The film was later released in 1,015 theaters across the U.S. on April 14, 2006, and has gone on to gross $24,793,509 domestically and $14,529,518 outside the country, for a total of $39,323,027 worldwide. The highest it ever rated at the North American box office was #8 on the weekend of its wide release. Although the film's box office performance was excellent for Reitman's directorial debut, it paled in comparison with his next two films, Juno and Up in the Air, both of which made well over $150,000,000 worldwide. As of 2017, the movie is the 14th highest-grossing political satire film.

=== Tobacco industry reaction ===
The tobacco industry itself was reluctant to take any sides or comment on the film. When New York Times reporter Michael Jankowsky contacted an Altria publicist about the tobacco giant's reaction, she "hesitated to respond, insisting that the film looks dated and poorly reflects the industry with depictions of tobacco executives as highly paid sleazeballs." Though Thank You for Smoking pokes fun at the industry, the novel it was adapted from is a much harsher critic of tobacco lobbyists, and the major tobacco companies have mostly kept quiet on the issue.

Reitman has maintained his purpose was to match the tone and satirical message of the book as closely as possible. "What I wanted people to think about was political correctness. I wanted them to think about ideas of personal responsibility and personal choice. I think cigarettes are a wonderful location for that discussion because cigarettes are something we know all the answers to", he posits. "I wanted to look into this idea of why we feel the need to tell each other how to live and why we can't take personal responsibility for our own actions when we fall ill from things that we know are dangerous." Stephanie Zacharek of Salon agreed with Reitman, saying "Despite its title, the movie doesn't come packaged with a strong anti-smoking message, because it doesn't need to: Everyone knows that smoking is bad for you, including people who continue to do it."

There is no point during the film at which any of the characters smoke. Dargis of The New York Times unwittingly states, "Thank You for Smoking is rated R (Under 17 requires accompanying parent or adult guardian). It includes mild violence, discreet sex and, of course, countless cigarettes." In the film, even Robert Duvall's filtered cigarette maverick "The Captain" is shown repeatedly drinking mint juleps rather than smoking cigarettes. Some critics argue that Reitman's reluctance to show the characters smoking is further confirmation of the film's anti-smoking stance. Reitman has issued statements disagreeing with this view. He said in an interview that "While it's not anti-smoking, it's very important people don't think that this is a pro-smoking movie. It's about freedom of choice." Buckley said about the decision to omit smoking that "[I]t was very deliberate, and I think rather cool." The Nick Naylor character has been compared to real-life Richard Berman of the Center for Consumer Freedom.

=== Awards and nominations ===
Thank You for Smoking did not receive a wide variety of nominations from the major award circuits; however, it did garner two Golden Globe nominations in its year for Best Picture (Musical or Comedy) and Best Actor in the same film genre for Aaron Eckhart's portrayal of Nick Naylor. The Broadcast Film Critics Association recognized Cameron Bright for his performance as Joey with a nomination for Best Young Actor, and also gave the film itself a nomination in the Comedy category. Jason Reitman received the Best Directorial Debut award from the National Board of Review of Motion Pictures.

== Soundtrack ==
Thank You for Smoking (Music from the Motion Picture)

Soundtrack album by Various artists
- Released: April 18, 2006
- Recorded: Various times
- Genre: Soundtrack
- Length: 38:02
- Label: Lakeshore Records

Professional ratings
Review scores
Source	Rating
Allmusic	4/5 stars

The Thank You for Smoking soundtrack was released April 14, 2006, and the CD came out on April 18, 2006. The first nine tracks are popular songs about smoking taken from the 1940s, 1950s, and 1960s. The famous track "Smoke! Smoke! Smoke! (That Cigarette)" opens the film. The final four tracks are instrumentals from the original score of Rolfe Kent, who had been nominated for best original score for his work on Sideways. AllMusic wrote that "The thread is obvious, but the selections sound handpicked rather than researched solely on the basis of their subject matter." Other critics have called the soundtrack "demented."

1. "Smoke! Smoke! Smoke! (That Cigarette)" (Tex Williams) – 2:54
2. "Smoke Rings" (The Mills Brothers) – 2:55
3. "Greenback Dollar" (The Kingston Trio) – 2:52
4. "Little Organ Fugue" (The Swingle Singers) – 2:23
5. "Smoke Gets in Your Eyes" (The Platters) – 2:40
6. "Three Cigarettes in an Ashtray" (Patsy Cline) – 2:16
7. "Cigarettes and Whisky" (Ramblin' Jack Elliott) – 2:02
8. "Cigarettes and Coffee" (Otis Redding) – 3:52
9. "Another Puff" (Jerry Reed) – 4:06
10. "Intro & Tobacco One" (Rolfe Kent) – 3:02
11. "Donate It & Sex Back in Cigarettes" (Rolfe Kent) – 3:01
12. "Joey & Drums of Doom" (Rolfe Kent) – 2:59
13. "Spanish Epilogue Revisited" (Rolfe Kent) – 3:00
14. "Wind of Change" (Scorpions) – 5:11

== Home media ==
The DVD was released on October 3, 2006, by 20th Century Fox, with both a widescreen and fullscreen edition. Each DVD contains two commentaries, one exclusively with Reitman and another with Reitman, Eckhart, and Koechner. Other extras include thirteen deleted scenes, a Charlie Rose interview, a making-of featurette, an "America: Living in Spin" featurette, a poster gallery, and an art gallery. The film has not yet been released on Blu-ray.

== Proposed television series ==
Variety reported on November 24, 2006, that NBC planned to create a television series based on the film. Sacks headed the adaptation as executive producer, with Rick Cleveland attached as head writer. After NBC passed on the project, it was brought to NBC's cable network, USA. James Dodson was set up as head writer as well as co-executive producer alongside Sacks. USA's chief programming executive Jeff Wachtel initially described the character as living between the morally ambiguous character of the film and Robin Hood. The series planned to adopt a different title and sought to start where the movie left off. The project never materialized and no official series of the movie has since developed. However, ABC's show Better Off Ted has been described as a "TV-sized version of Thank You for Smoking".
