= Florence of Arabia =

2004 novel by Christopher Buckley

- First edition
- Author: Christopher Buckley
- Language: English
- Genre: Satirical novel
- Publisher: Random House
- Publication date: 2004
- Publication place: United States
- Media type: Print (hardback & paperback)
- Pages: 253 pp
- ISBN: 1-4000-6223-3
- OCLC: 55665550
- Dewey Decimal: 813/.54 22
- LC Class: PS3552.U3394 F55 2004

Florence of Arabia is a satirical novel written by Christopher Buckley and first published in 2004 by Random House. The novel follows a fictional State Department employee, Florence Farfaletti, as she attempts to bring equal rights to the fictional Middle Eastern nation of "Matar."

== Plot summary ==
The wife of the ambassador of the fictional Middle Eastern nation of Wasabia gets drunk, steals her husband's car and drives out of the compound. When pulled over by police, she desperately phones her friend Florence Farfaletti, the "Deputy to the Deputy Assistant Secretary of State for Near Eastern Affairs," begging for asylum to avoid a harsh punishment. Florence is unable to arrange asylum.

The wife is taken back to Wasabia and beheaded for her crime. In anger over her friend's execution, Florence drafts a proposal to introduce a women's television network in the relatively liberal Matar. The state department rejects the proposal, and reassigns Florence to an obscure posting outside the country. To Florence's surprise, a mysterious government employee, identified only as "Uncle Sam," representing an unknown agency, notifies Florence that her proposal has been accepted and agrees to fund the mission.

Florence arrives in Matar and creates a women's television network that is broadcast into neighboring Wasabia. The network airs shows like "One Thousand and One Mornings," which feature empowered female characters who nettle their oppressors and make fun of men. The programming is effective, eventually causing the women of Matar to stage an uprising.

Florence is thrown in jail, but ultimately is rescued and returns to the United States. Back in the United States, Florence discovers that her operation was not funded by the U.S. government at all, but rather by the Waldorf Group, a private equity firm which wanted to prevent extremism in Wasabia to help secure the flow of profits.

Florence is exasperated to have been working for bankers all along, but glad that her work improved the status of women's rights in Wasabia. An ex-president, who is on the board of the Waldorf Group, tells her, "One way or the other, Florence, we're all working for investment bankers."

== Objects of satire ==
The novel is set in the fictional state of Matar, a somewhat liberal Middle Eastern sheikdom, similar to the real world Qatar. The neighboring country Wasabia refers to Saudi Arabia, with Wasabia being a play on Wahhabism, one of the most conservative forms of Islam, which is criticized throughout the book for its treatment of women.

The Washington Post reviewer wrote, tongue in cheek, of the fictional country of Wasabia : "Its oppressive power is guaranteed by optimum connections to the American establishment greased by a suave prince as its longtime ambassador in Washington. Wasabia's medieval legal system, among other things, subjugates, humiliates and violates women, as well as executing them for such vices as flirting. Of course this is a wholly fictional land, too absurd to resemble any in the real family of nations."

The firm "the Waldorf Group" is a reference to the Carlyle Group.

The novel was among the first to lampoon terrorism and Islamist extremism, which in the post-9/11 era were not considered laughing matters. The book also portrays U.S. foreign policy as contributing to those problems.

== Publication ==
The story was first published in two long excerpts in the September and October issues of The Atlantic Monthly. The book was published in hardcover on September 14, 2004.

The title of the novel is a play on "Lawrence of Arabia", a popular name for the British Army officer T. E. Lawrence, who became famous for his exploits in the Middle East, particularly as a liaison during the Arab Revolt of 1916–1918. Buckley finished writing the novel on May 19, 2004, the anniversary of Lawrence's death. The pun "Florence of Arabia" was first coined by Noël Coward, who told the actor Peter O'Toole (who played Lawrence in the film Lawrence of Arabia) that "If you'd been any prettier, it would have been Florence of Arabia."

The novel is an homage to Fern Holland, whom Buckley describes as a "real-life Florence of Arabia." Holland was a 33-year-old lawyer who went to work for the Coalition Provisional Authority in Iraq. On March 9, 2004, Holland was murdered for her work involving women's rights. Holland, Robert J. Zangas (another U.S. aid worker) and Salwa Oumashi, were the first civilians working for the occupation authority to be killed.

== Film adaptation ==
Variety announced on July 28, 2009, that Charlize Theron would produce and star as Florence in a film adaptation of the book. Dean Craig is slated to write the script.
