= Supreme Courtship =

2008 novel by Christopher Buckley

- Supreme Courtship book cover
- Author: Christopher Buckley
- Cover artist: Fearn Cutler de Vicq
- Language: English
- Genre: Satire
- Publisher: Twelve
- Publication date: September 3, 2008
- Publication place: United States
- Media type: Print (Hardcover)
- Pages: 272 pp
- ISBN: 978-0-446-57982-7
- OCLC: 212893548
- Dewey Decimal: 813/.54 22
- LC Class: PS3552.U3394 S87 2008

Supreme Courtship is a 2008 novel by Christopher Buckley, which tells the story of a Judge Judy-style TV judge nominated to the Supreme Court of the United States.

== Plot summary ==
After several failed attempts to seek Senate approval for his Supreme Court nominations, perpetually unpopular President Donald P. Vanderdamp (nicknamed "Don Veto" by Congress) decides to get even by nominating Judge Pepper Cartwright, star of Courtroom Six and America's most popular TV judge, to the Supreme Court. Soon, Cartwright finds herself in the middle of a constitutional crisis, a Presidential campaign, and entanglements both political and romantic in nature.

== Analysis ==
As described by Buckley on The Daily Show on October 21, 2008, the judge character is an attractive, gun-toting, glasses-wearing spitfire who is inexperienced in politics, drawing the obvious comparison to 2008 Republican vice presidential nominee Sarah Palin. However, Buckley finished the novel in January, months before Senator John McCain announced his choice. He then jokingly announced his retirement from satire, to which host Jon Stewart replied "Once the satirical book comes true within six months, you're done."

Many media pundits recognized the book's main conflict between the chairman and Judge Cartwright as directly paralleling the contest between Vice-Presidential Democratic nominee Joe Biden and Republican nominee Sarah Palin.

== See also ==
- Supreme Court of the United States in fiction
