= The Tenth Justice =

- First edition (US)
- Author: Brad Meltzer
- Language: English
- Genre: Novel
- Publisher: William Morrow (UK); Hodder & Stoughton (UK)
- Publication date: July 9, 1997
- Publication place: United States
- Media type: Print (hardback & paperback)
- Pages: 560 pp
- ISBN: 0688150896
- OCLC: 35627723

The Tenth Justice (1997) is Brad Meltzer's first novel, who. He wrote the book when he was 26, a recent graduate of Columbia Law School.

The book centers on a Supreme Court clerk who leaks the court's rulings to another lawyer. The lawyer is a fraud who blackmails the clerk. The clerk and his friends devise a plan to save themselves and stop the blackmailer.

According to WorldCat, the book is held by 1901 libraries.

== Plot ==
Ben Addison, a new Supreme Court clerk, accidentally reveals an upcoming decision to another lawyer. That lawyer is a fraud though and he makes millions off the announcement. The lawyer also blackmails Ben. To save himself, Ben shares his secret with Lisa, a fellow clerk, and his three roommates: a State Department worker, a Washington Daily reporter and a Senator's assistant. The team uses their resources to uncover the blackmailer and save their friend, but their abuse of power comes at a cost. Someone within their circle is leaking information, so they must battle internal and external forces to secure their once-bright futures.

== Proposed film adaptation ==
On April 8, 2003, Justin Lin was set to direct the feature-film adaptation of the novel, and co-write the screenplay with Fabian Marquez and Ernesto Foronda, with Fox 2000 set to distribute the movie.

== See also ==
- Supreme Court of the United States in fiction
