= Little Green Men (novel) =

1999 novel by Christopher Buckley

- First edition cover
- Author: Christopher Buckley
- Language: English
- Genre: Satire
- Publisher: Random House
- Publication date: 1999
- Publication place: United States
- Media type: Print
- Pages: 300 pp
- ISBN: 0-06-095557-0
- OCLC: 42863210

Little Green Men is a satirical novel by Christopher Buckley, first published in 1999. The novel follows a fictional "Inside the Beltway" talk-show host whose career and life is altered forever when he is abducted by aliens.

== Plot ==
John O. Banion is a well-known pundit, who hosts a popular Sunday-morning television show (similar to Meet the Press). One morning, Banion grills the president of the United States on issues surrounding NASA. Shortly after, while enjoying a game of golf, Banion is abducted by what he believes are aliens and taken to their lab and probed.

When he is returned, Banion is a changed man. He sets about trying to convince his friends in the Washington elite that the alien threat is real, but he is met with skepticism and derision. His marriage begins to fall apart and his friends abandon him.

Banion starts to doubt himself, but is soon abducted a second time. When he returns from this abduction he completely abandons his old life and redevotes all his energy to pressuring Congress and the White House to investigate the alien threat.

In fact, Banion was not abducted by aliens at all. Rather, he was abducted by Majestic, a government agency so secret that not even the president knew it existed. The purpose of Majestic was to occasionally make U.S. citizens believe they had been abducted by aliens. The abductees helped spread paranoia that was crucial to sustain public support for NASA's funding levels. When Majestic saw that Banion was critical of these funding levels, a Majestic agent authorized the abduction.

However, the abduction of a well-known public figure caused problems within Majestic. Normally, they abducted slightly crazy people because, while helping "spread the word", nobody would take them too seriously. In an attempt to cover up the error, the leader of Majestic attempts to have Banion sentenced to death.

As the truth about Majestic is discovered, the agency is ultimately forced to disband and the charges against Banion are dropped, although his life as a "Beltway insider" is ruined.

== Objects of satire ==
John O. Banion (whose initials spell the ever-suffering Biblical Job) is thought to be a caricature of political commentator George Will. Banion's best friend in the novel, Burton Galilee, is a thinly veiled version of Clinton advisor Vernon Jordan. Also lampooned was the aging senator Strom Thurmond, as a similar character, 92-year-old senator Raysor Mentallius, the chairman of the Senate Hindsight Committee.

Several non-political figures are also satirized. One of the minor characters in the book, Karl Cuntmore, is an author of popular political thriller novels who presents himself as a defense expert. The character is suspected to be a swipe at the popular political thriller novels of author Tom Clancy, whom Buckley had criticized in the past.

Others escape Buckley's satire altogether. Some famous television personalities, such as Tom Brokaw, Larry King and others, appear in the book as unmolested versions of themselves.

== Film adaptation ==
In July 1998, New Line Cinema purchased screen rights to the novel just before publication began, with plans to have Barry Levinson direct and produce.

In May 2006, plans to make a film version were reinstated, with Whit Stillman attached to direct the film. The book has been adapted by Sean Bates and Gregory Mackenzie, while Ed Solomon would produce. Stillman said that production would depend on how fast casting would cultivate. Stillman would later state he was no longer on the project.
