= Boomsday (novel) =

2007 novel by Christopher Buckley

- First edition cover of Boomsday.
- Author: Christopher Buckley
- Cover artist: Will Staehle
- Language: English
- Genre: Political Satirical novel
- Publisher: Twelve
- Publication date: April 2, 2007
- Publication place: United States
- Media type: Print
- Pages: 336 pp (First Edition, Hardback)
- ISBN: 978-0-446-57981-0
- OCLC: 70885026
- Dewey Decimal: 813/.54 22
- LC Class: PS3552.U3394 B66 2007

Boomsday, a 2007 novel by Christopher Buckley, is a political satire about the rivalry between squandering Baby Boomers and younger generations of Americans who do not want to pay high taxes for their elders' retirement.

== Title ==
Boomsday is referred to in the book as the day that a majority of the Baby Boomers would begin retiring, thrusting the United States into economic trouble and the raising of taxes to compensate for Social Security.

== Plot synopsis ==
Cassandra Devine, "a morally superior twenty-nine-year-old PR chick" and moonlit angry blogger, incites generational warfare when she proposes that the financially nonviable Baby Boomers be given incentives (free Botox, no estate tax) to kill themselves at 70. The proposal, meant only as a catalyst for debate on the issue, catches the approval of millions of citizens, chief among them an ambitious presidential candidate, Senator Randolph Jepperson.

With the aide of public relations guru Terry Tucker, Devine and Jepperson attempt to ride "Voluntary Transitioning" all the way to the White House, over the objections of the Religious Right and the Baby Boomers, deeply offended by the demonstrations taking place on the golf courses of their retirement resorts.

== Connections to other media ==
Terry Tucker, Cassandra's boss and co-conspirator, is said to have learned what he knows from Nick Naylor, the protagonist of Buckley's 1994 novel Thank You For Smoking.

== Reception ==
Jane and Michael Stern of The New York Times compared Boomsday to Saturday Night Live and the works of Kurt Vonnegut, although both comparisons were unfavorable, noting that Buckley's novel "might make you long for the days when puerile humor wasn't confused with genuine wit." Missy Schwartz of Entertainment Weekly remarked that "Buckley's ace storytelling trumps any shortcomings. And when you're as ticked off about the state of our country as Buckley seems to be, who has time for subtlety?"

Janet Maslin of The New York Times wrote, in praising the book, that "even at its breeziest, Boomsday features wickedly plausible ingredients like a Cape Town-to-Rio Rolex Challenge for yachts and a boomer-advocacy organization whose office lobby has been given the brushed-steel look of a Sub-Zero refrigerator. From its jailed reporters who form a “Pulitzer Nation” (wearing “do-rags made from expensive hosiery”) to tax exemptions for Segways and cosmetic surgery, not to mention a proposed set of celebrity-endorsement suicide ads (“like the milk ads, only they’re drinking poison”), this satire combines the serious and the ridiculous with dead-on aplomb."

== Film adaptation ==
Screenwriters Ron Bass and Jen Smolka have adapted the novel into a screenplay. Tom Vaughan was announced as director for a film production announced for early 2011 shooting by GreeneStreet Films and Das Films. As of mid-2020, the movie was still officially classed as "in production".

== See also ==
- The Old Law, a 17th-century tragicomedy written by Thomas Middleton, William Rowley, and Philip Massinger
- Jonathan Swift: A Modest Proposal: For Preventing the Children of Poor People in Ireland from Being a Burden to Their Parents or Country, and for Making Them Beneficial to the Publick (1729)
- Anthony Trollope's 1882 dystopian novel, The Fixed Period
- Keisuke Kinoshita's The Ballad of Narayama (1958), Korean director Kim Ki-young's Goryeojang (1963), and Shohei Imamura's The Ballad of Narayama, which won the Palme d'Or in 1983.
- Logan's Run
