= God Is My Broker =

1998 book by Christopher Buckley

- First edition cover
- Author: Christopher Buckley, John Tierney
- Language: English
- Publisher: Random House
- Publication date: 1998
- ISBN: 0-375-50006-5 (first edition)
- Dewey Decimal: 813.54
- LC Class: BV4517 .T9

God Is My Broker (ISBN 0-375-50006-5) is a satirical book written by Christopher Buckley and John Tierney, published in 1998 by Random House which parodies self-help books, such as those of Deepak Chopra, whose works are particularly singled out.

The protagonist is Brother Ty, a failed stockbroker, who becomes a monk at a failing wine-producing monastery. The book tells his tale of financial and spiritual improvement while setting out the 7½ Laws of Spiritual and Financial Growth.

In an interview with The New York Times, Christopher Buckley said that the initial idea was to do a straightforward hoax, but that the publishers were reluctant, due to their 'Anonymous' author having just been 'un-anonymoused'.
