= Independents' Day =

- Directed by: Laura Beth Love
- Written by: Geoff Meed (screenplay)
- Produced by: Paul Bales; Lauren Elizabeth Hood; David Michael Latt; David Rimawi
- Starring: Fay Gauthier; Sal Landi; Johnny Rey Diaz
- Cinematography: Laura Beth Love
- Edited by: Laura Beth Love
- Music by: Mike Verta
- Distributed by: The Asylum
- Release date: July 7, 2016
- Running time: 91 minutes
- Country: United States
- Language: English

Independents' Day is a 2016 science fiction action film starring Fay Gauthier, Sal Landi and Johnny Rey Diaz made by The Asylum. In the tradition of most of The Asylum's catalog, Independents' Day is a mockbuster of the 1996 film Independence Day and its 2016 sequel Independence Day: Resurgence.

== Plot ==
The alien Orions, believing that humans are too violent, attack Earth and destroy many of the planet's capital cities. They then apparently heal many of the sick and offer to transport them; those who are hungry and others who wanted to go to another planet and many of the earthlings volunteer to go. An "Earth First" militia forms to fight the aliens, while the US Vice President (as the aliens have killed the President) negotiates with the aliens. The plot was noted to be convoluted.

== Cast ==
- Fay Gauthier as President Raney
- Sal Landi as General Roundtree (credited as Salvatore Garriola)
- Johnny Rey Diaz as Captain Goddard (credited as Jonathan Ortiz)
- Matthew Riley as Bobby (credited as Matthew Poalillo)
- Jon Edwin Wright as Senator Randall Raney (credited as Jon Wright)
- Jude Lanston as Agent Taylor
- Jacquelin Arroyo as "Red" / Fighter Pilot
- William Castrogiovanni as Major Fry / Fighter Pilot
- Vishesh Chachra as Sergeant Cates
- Brian Tyler Cohen as Ari / Fighter Pilot
- Christos Kalabogias as Norman Reed
- Jes Selane as Kelly Reed
- Kurt Sinclair as President Oliver
- Jonathan Thomson as General Henderson
- Holger Moncada Jr. as Moncada

== Reviews ==
Dread Central found the movie neither good nor bad.
