= Mutual self-help housing =

Government program in the United States

Mutual self-help housing is a government program in the United States to assist groups of low-income families in building their own homes. Each family is expected to contribute at least 700 hours of labor in building homes for each other.

Participating families generally have low income and are unable to pay for homes built by the contract method. The homes generally are financed by Section 502 loans.
