= Christopher Buckley (novelist) =

American writer (born 1952)

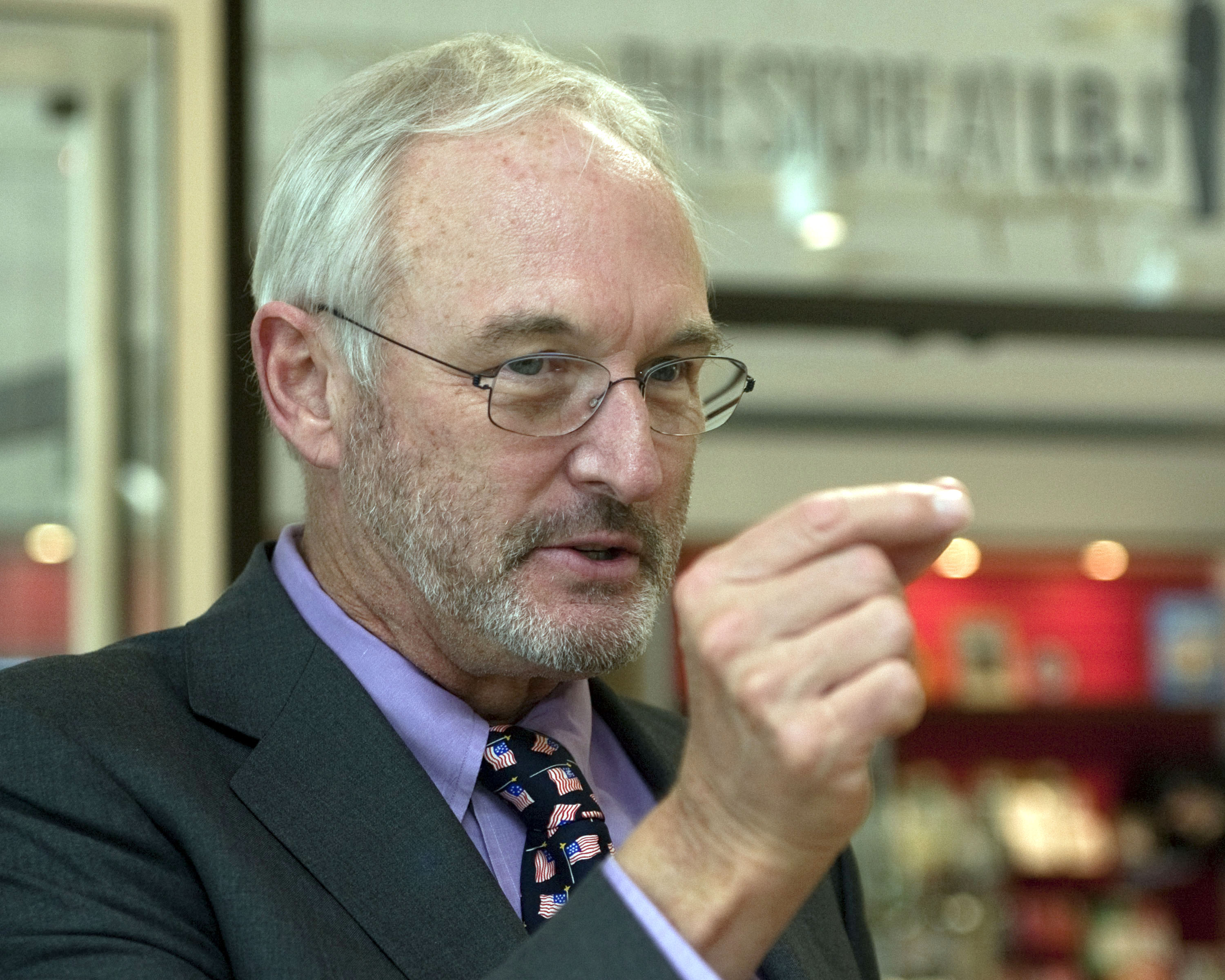
- Buckley in 2012
- Born: Christopher Taylor Buckley; September 28, 1952 (age 73); New York City, U.S.
- Education: Yale University (BA)
- Occupations: Author; satirist; novelist
- Spouses: Lucy Gregg; Katherine Close
- Children: 3
- Parents: William F. Buckley Jr. (father); Patricia Buckley (mother)
- Relatives: James L. Buckley (uncle); Priscilla Buckley (aunt); Patricia Buckley Bozell (aunt); Reid Buckley (uncle); L. Brent Bozell III (cousin)

Christopher Taylor Buckley (born September 28, 1952) is an American author and political satirist. He also served as chief speechwriter to Vice President George H. W. Bush. He is known for writing God Is My Broker, Thank You for Smoking, Little Green Men, The White House Mess, No Way to Treat a First Lady, Wet Work, Florence of Arabia, Boomsday, Supreme Courtship, Losing Mum and Pup: A Memoir, and The Judge Hunter.

== Early life and education ==
Buckley is the only child of writer and Firing Line host William F. Buckley Jr. and Patricia Buckley. After receiving a classical education at Portsmouth Abbey School, Buckley worked his way around the world as a deckhand on a Norwegian tramp freighter. He graduated cum laude from Yale University in 1976.

== Career ==
He joined the staff of Esquire magazine in 1976 and seven months later was promoted at age 24 to managing editor. In 1980 he returned to sea aboard an American ship and made eight mid-winter transatlantic crossings between U.S. Gulf ports and North Sea ports in England and Germany. The experience was the basis for his first bestselling non-fiction book, Steaming to Bamboola: The World of a Tramp Freighter, published in 1982.

In 1981, he moved to Washington, D.C. to become chief speechwriter to Vice President George H. W. Bush. His first bestselling novel, The White House Mess, published in 1986, was a satire on White House office politics and political memoirs.

In 1989, Malcolm S. Forbes hired Buckley to start up a supplement to Forbes magazine. Buckley was editor-in-chief of Forbes FYI, later Forbes Life, from 1990 to 2007.

His 20 books have been published in 16 languages. His novel Thank You For Smoking was adapted to the screen and directed by Jason Reitman.

=== National Review ===
In summer and fall 2008, Christopher Buckley wrote the back-page column for National Review, the conservative magazine founded by his father. In October 2008, Buckley wrote a column endorsing Barack Obama, the Democratic presidential nominee, choosing to have it published in The Daily Beast to avoid backlash from National Review readers. After many National Review readers and contributors still expressed their displeasure, Buckley resigned from that publication.

The Beast's title for his endorsement, "Sorry, Dad, I'm Voting for Obama", was found by many of his father's friends and supporters to be offensive, particularly as it appeared shortly after his father's death. Buckley disavowed the choice of title, although he continued to occasionally write for the Beast.

== Personal life ==
Buckley's first marriage was to Lucy Gregg, the daughter of Donald Gregg, who served as assistant to Vice President Bush for national security affairs and later as United States Ambassador to South Korea. Buckley and Gregg have two children. In 2000, Buckley's son was born to former Random House publicist Irina Woelfle. Buckley and Gregg divorced in 2011.

In 2012, he married Katherine Close, a physician. She has four children.

== Bibliography ==
=== Satirical novels ===
- God Is My Broker: A Monk-Tycoon Reveals the 7½ Laws of Spiritual and Financial Growth (1998) (written with John Tierney)
- Has Anyone Seen My Toes? (2022)

==== Political satire ====
- The White House Mess (1986)
- Thank You for Smoking (1994)
- Little Green Men (1999)
- No Way to Treat a First Lady (2002)
- Florence of Arabia (2004)
- Boomsday (2007)
- Supreme Courtship (2008)
- They Eat Puppies, Don't They? (2012)
- Make Russia Great Again: A Novel (2020)

==== Historical satire ====
- The Relic Master (2015)
- The Judge Hunter (2018)

=== Films based on novels ===
- Thank You for Smoking (2006) (Directed by Jason Reitman, Screenplay also by Reitman)
- Little Green Men (In development) (Screenplay by Sean Bates and Gregory Mackenzie)
- Boomsday (In development) Screenwriters Ron Bass and Jen Smolka have adapted the novel into a screenplay. Tom Vaughan was set to direct the film in early 2011 for GreeneStreet Films and Das Films

=== Travelogues ===
- Steaming to Bamboola – The World of a Tramp Freighter (1983)
- Washington Schlepped Here: Walking in the Nation's Capital (2003)

=== Other ===
External videos
- Booknotes interview with Buckley on Wry Martinis, May 4, 1997, C-SPAN

- Theophilus North (introduction)
- If These Walls Could Talk (contributor)
- 101 Damnations (contributor)
- Islands: A Treasury of Contemporary Travel Writing (contributor)
- Fierce Pajamas: An Anthology of Humor Writing from The New Yorker (contributor)
- Disquiet, Please! More Humor Writing from The New Yorker (contributor)
- The New Yorker Book of Political Cartoons (introduction)
- Ray Bradbury: The Stories of Ray Bradbury (introduction)
- Our Man in Havana, by Graham Greene (introduction)
- Bright Pages: Yale Writers, 1701-2001 (contributor)
- Mirth of a Nation (contributor)
- The Faber Book of Smoking (contributor)
- The New Yorker Book of Money Cartoons (introduction)
- Another Sage of Baltimore (contributor)
- True Prep (contributor)
- Catch-22: 50th Anniversary edition (introduction)
- The Best American Travel Writing (contributor)
- Moby-Dick (afterword)
- The Seven Deadly Virtues (contributor)
- Wish You Weren't There (contributor)
- Once a Catholic (contributor)
- The Best American Nonrequired Reading (contributor)
- Backward and Upward: The New Conservative Writing (contributor)
- Legend: Frank Sinatra and the American Dream (contributor)
- Sex and God at Yale (introduction)
- The Essential New York Times Book of Cocktails (introduction)
- Thank You For Smoking: The Shooting Script (introduction)
- Now What? Essays on Life After Trump (contributor)
- My Harvard, My Yale (1981) (university biography)
- Campion: A Play in Two Acts (1990) (written with James Macguire) (play)
- Wet Work (1991) (novel)
- Wry Martinis (1997) (collected humor and journalism)
- Losing Mum and Pup: A Memoir (2009). Description & preview. Hachette ISBN 0-446-54094-3 (Biographical)
- But Enough About You: Essays (May 6, 2014). Description & preview. Simon & Schuster ISBN 978-1476749518
- Postscript: Christopher Hitchens, 1949-2011 (The New Yorker)
