= William F. B. O'Reilly =

American opinion columnist and political consultant

- Born: William Francis Buckley O'Reilly; August 10, 1963 (age 63); Sharon, Connecticut, U.S.
- Education: New York University
- Occupations: Opinion columnist, political consultant
- Children: 3
- Relatives: William F. Buckley Jr. (uncle)

William Francis Buckley O'Reilly (born August 10, 1963) is an American opinion columnist and Republican political consultant from Mount Kisco, New York. He is a partner at The November Team LLC, a New York-based communications firm.

O'Reilly is the publisher of the conservative newsblog the "Blackberry Alarm Clock". He also writes a twice-weekly opinion column for Newsday.

== Early life and career ==
O'Reilly was born in Sharon, Connecticut, the son of Maureen Buckley-O'Reilly and Gerald A. O'Reilly, a senior vice president at Richardson-Vicks. He is a grandson of Texas oilman William F. Buckley and a nephew of famed conservative author William F. Buckley, Jr., former United States Senator James L. Buckley, author Fergus Reid Buckley, National Review Editor Priscilla Buckley and Patricia Buckley Bozell. O'Reilly is a great-grandson of American writer and diplomat Maurice Francis Egan.

He went to New York University and worked for a time as a journalist in Tortola in the British Virgin Islands. He began his work in politics for State Senator Roy Goodman and later worked as a press officer at the New York State Senate and New York City Council.

== Political consulting ==
O'Reilly has worked on or advised dozens of U.S. political and public affairs campaigns in his career and once served as President of the Metropolitan Republican Club, an iconic institution on New York City's Upper East Side founded by former President Theodore Roosevelt in 1902. O'Reilly has been a consistent conservative critic of President Donald Trump.

He was a co-founder of O'Reilly Strategic Communications LLC. He worked on the campaign of the last elected Manhattan Republican, Assemblyman John Ravitz. In 2006, O'Reilly notably helped guide long-shot Gubernatorial candidate and ex New York State Assembly Minority Leader, John Faso to the Republican nomination over establishment favorite, Bill Weld. He later sold the firm to his partner, MSNBC political commentator Susan Del Percio in 2009.

Joining the firm of Nicholas & Lence Communications, owned by George Lence and Cristyne Nicholas, communications consultants to both Mayors Rudy Giuliani and Michael Bloomberg, O'Reilly began consulting for both political and corporate clients. As a partner and executive vice president, he headed up the firm's political unit, known as NLO Strategies. His clients have included Westchester County Executive Rob Astorino, who won an upset victory in 2009, 2010 New York State Comptroller candidate Harry Wilson, Congressman Bob Turner, also an upset winner in 2011, and 2012 New York State Senate Candidates Eric Ulrich and Bob Cohen. He is also the communications consultant for the New York Republican State Committee.

In 2014, he broke off from NLO to form the November Team LLC, which was advising Astorino's nascent gubernatorial campaign against incumbent Governor Andrew Cuomo. Coincidentally, the Cuomo Administration hired his former Republican partners Del Percio and Nicholas."

== Personal life ==
O’Reilly is described as "widely regarded as someone even reporters like to deal with". Campaigns & Elections magazine named him one of New York State's Top Influencers in 2010, calling him "a savvy PR specialist" and "widely respected among reporters as tough but fair".

He is a former board member of the American Association of Political Consultants, a board member of the William F. Buckley, Jr. Program at Yale University, and regularly appears on radio and television as a political spokesman and analyst. O'Reilly is married, with three children.

== Bibliography ==
- John B. Judis (1990). William F. Buckley, Jr.: Patron Saint of the Conservatives. New York: Touchstone Books. ISBN 0-671-69593-2
