= Bozell (disambiguation) =

Bozell may refer to:

- Bozell, an American advertising agency based in Omaha, Nebraska

People

- Leo B. Bozell (1886–1946), American advertising executive, co-founder of Bozell
  - L. Brent Bozell Jr. (1926–1997), American conservative activist and Catholic writer
  - Patricia Buckley Bozell (1927 – 2008), American writer
    - L. Brent Bozell III (born 1955), conservative author and activist, founder of the Media Research Center
