= Leo Brent Bozell =

Leo Brent Bozell or Brent Bozell may refer to:

- Leo B. Bozell (1886–1946), American advertising executive, co-founder of Bozell
- L. Brent Bozell Jr. (1926–1997), American conservative activist and Catholic writer
- L. Brent Bozell III (born 1955), conservative author and activist, founder of the Media Research Center
