= 2003 United States Court of Appeals for the District of Columbia Circuit opinions of John Roberts =

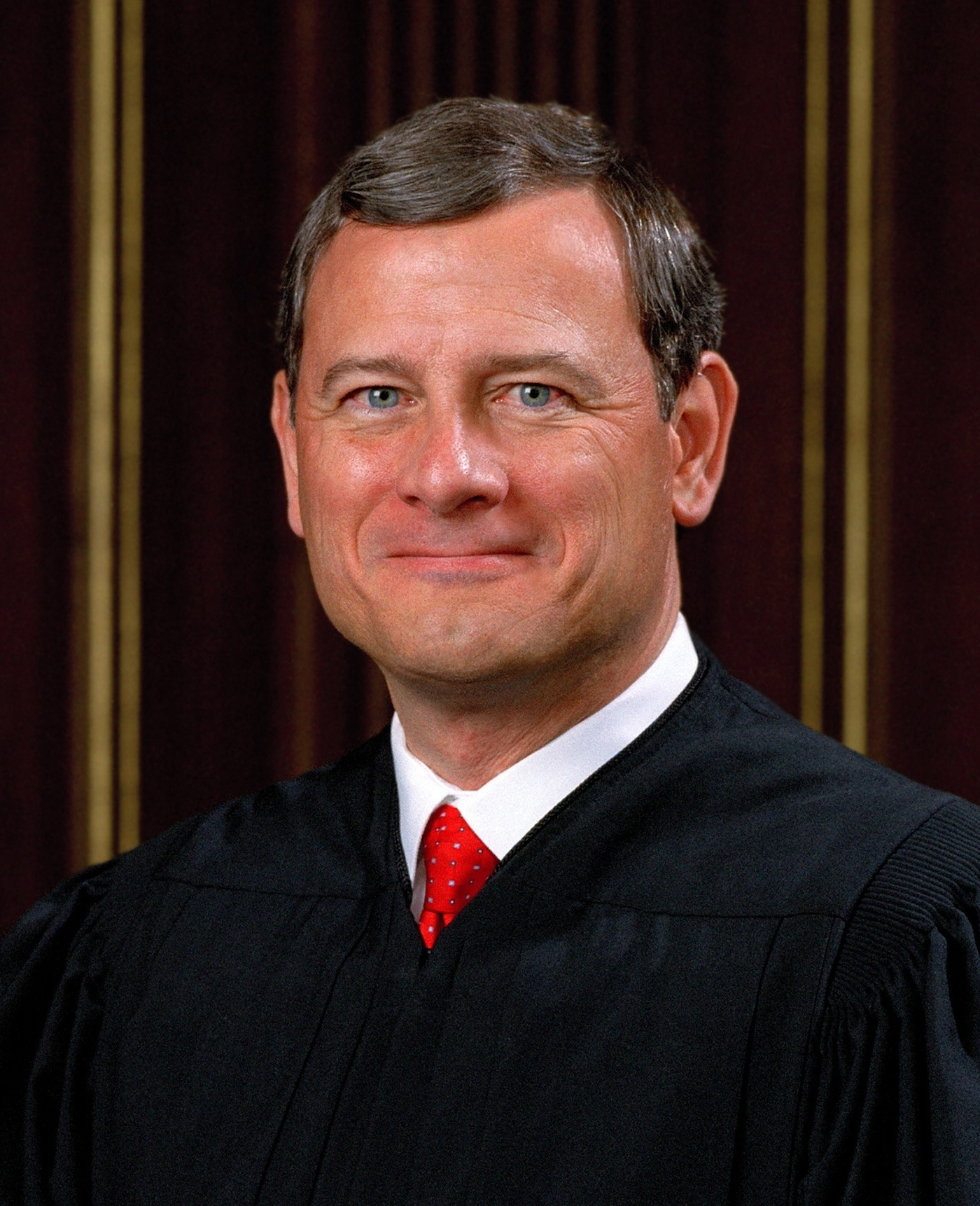
John G. Roberts, Jr.

John Roberts joined the United States Court of Appeals for the District of Columbia Circuit in 2003, succeeding James L. Buckley. The following are opinions written by Judge Roberts in 2003.

October 2003
Ramaprakash v. Federal Aviation Administration, 346 F.3d 1121 (D.C. Cir. October 21, 2003).
United States v. Bolla, 346 F.3d 1148 (D.C. Cir. October 24, 2003).
Consumers Electronics Association v. Federal Communications Commission, 347 F.3d 291 (D.C. Cir. October 28, 2003).

November 2003
Bloch v. Powell, 348 F.3d 1060 (D.C. Cir. November 21, 2003).
Sioux Valley Rural Television v. FCC, 349 F.3d 667 (D.C. Cir. November 21, 2003).
DSMC v. Convera, 349 F.3d 679 (D.C. Cir. November 21, 2003).

December 2003
BDPCS v. Federal Communications Commission, 351 F.3d 1177 (D.C. Cir. December 16, 2003).
IT Consultants v. Pakistan, 351 F.3d 1184 (D.C. Cir. December 16, 2003).
Stewart v. Evans, 351 F.3d 1239 (D.C. Cir. December 19, 2003).
