= Weapons of Mass Distortion =

2004 book by L. Brent Bozell III

Weapons of Mass Distortion: The Coming Meltdown of the Liberal Media
- Author: L. Brent Bozell III
- Publisher: Crown Publishing Group
- Publication date: July 6, 2004
- ISBN: 978-1-4000-5378-0

Weapons of Mass Distortion: The Coming Meltdown of the Liberal Media is a book allegedly by conservative activist L. Brent Bozell III, criticizing and documenting what Bozell described as the American news media's "liberal media bias."

Bozell argues that the "Liberal Media" will soon collapse on itself, due to their own refusal to admit their perceived faults and bias. As the alleged cycle continues, the possibility for them to recover from previous grievances becomes less likely.

The book may have been ghostwritten by Tim Graham.

It was published in hardcover by Crown Publishing Group July 6, 2004, with ISBN 978-1-4000-5378-0.

== See also ==
- Media Research Center
