= L. Brent Bozell III =

American conservative writer and activist (born 1955)

Brent Bozell
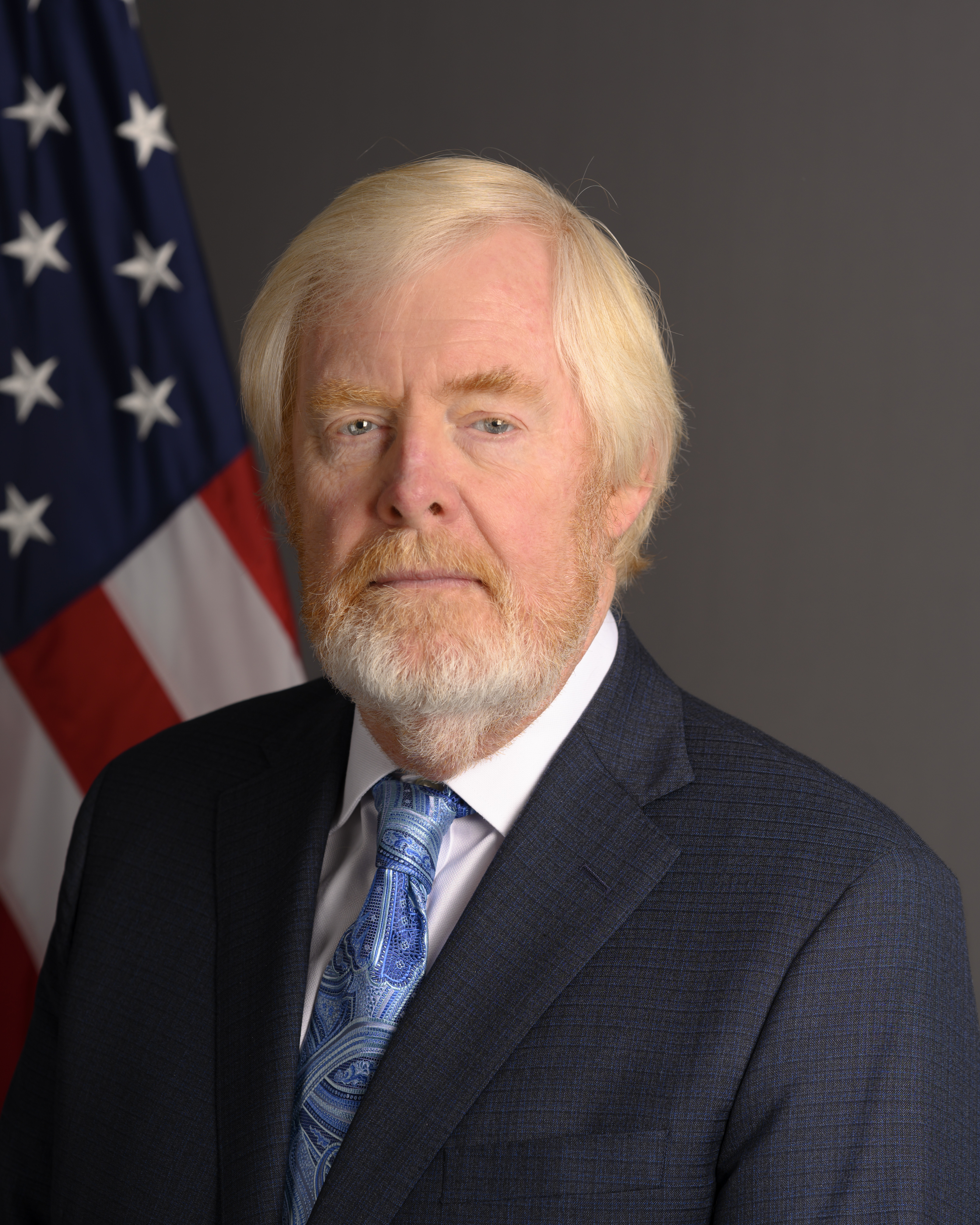
- Official portrait, 2026

United States Ambassador to South Africa
- Incumbent
- Assumed office February 23, 2026
- President: Donald Trump
- Preceded by: Reuben Brigety

Personal details
- Born: Leo Brent Bozell III; July 14, 1955 (age 71) Washington, D.C., U.S.
- Spouse: Norma Petruccione
- Children: 5
- Parents: L. Brent Bozell Jr. (father); Patricia Buckley Bozell (mother)
- Relatives: William F. Buckley Jr. (uncle); James L. Buckley (uncle); Priscilla Buckley (aunt); Reid Buckley (uncle); Christopher Buckley (cousin); Leo B. Bozell (grandfather); William F. Buckley Sr. (grandfather)
- Education: University of Dallas (BA)

Leo Brent Bozell III (/boʊˈzɛl/ boh-ZEL; born July 14, 1955) is an American conservative activist, writer and diplomat, currently United States Ambassador to South Africa. Bozell is also the founder of the Media Research Center and Parents Television Council.

Bozell began his career with the National Conservative Political Action Committee in the late 1970s. He established the Media Research Center in 1987, as a watchdog group critiquing alleged liberal bias in news media. Then in 1995, Bozell started the Parents Television Council, an organization notable for its campaigns against indecency in entertainment, including advertiser boycotts and complaints to the Federal Communications Commission. In 2026, Bozell became United States Ambassador to South Africa, having been nominated by President Donald Trump.

== Early life and education ==
Bozell is one of ten children of L. Brent Bozell Jr. and Patricia Buckley Bozell. He is a nephew of the late conservative writer and National Review founder William F. Buckley Jr. and the late United States Senator James L. Buckley and is a grandson of William Frank Buckley Sr. He is of Irish, German, and English descent. Bozell's father was William Buckley Jr.'s debating partner at Yale University and a conservative activist; his grandfather Leo B. Bozell was a co-founder of Bozell Worldwide.

Bozell received a Bachelor of Arts in history from the University of Dallas in 1977.

== Career ==
Bozell joined a since-disbanded organization called the National Conservative Political Action Committee, where he worked for the group's founder, Terry Dolan, to help elect conservative politicians.

=== Criticism of the anti-apartheid movement ===
In 1987, Bozell and the NCPAC joined a coalition of groups opposed to the Reagan administration meeting with the president of the African National Congress, the leading anti-apartheid group in South Africa. Bozell wrote that he was "proud to become a member of the Coalition Against ANC Terrorism." In 2013 Bozell complained on Twitter that the mainstream media "mythologizes" the late anti-apartheid leader and first president of a post-apartheid South Africa, Nelson Mandela.

=== Media Research Center ===
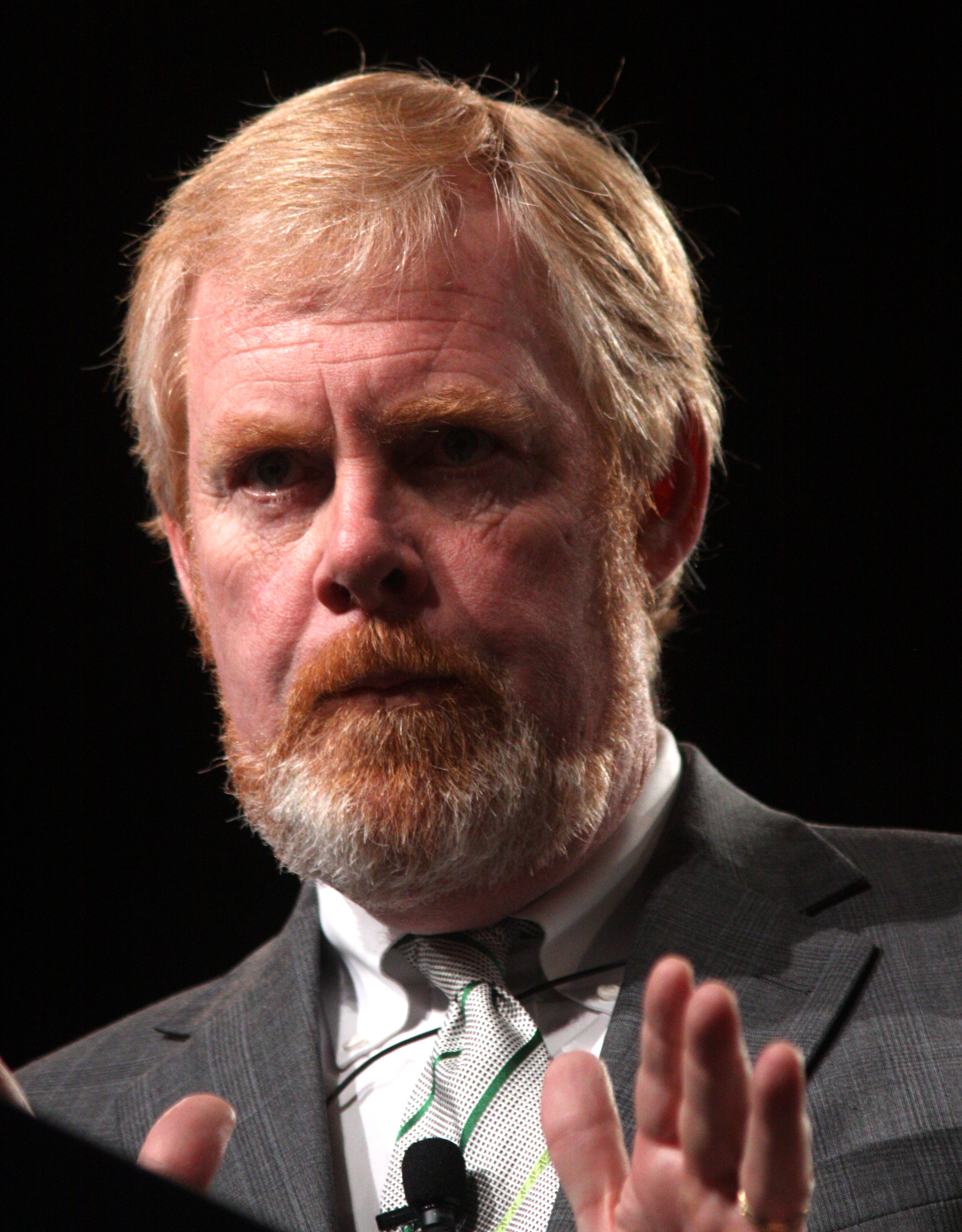
Bozell in 2011.

In 1987, Bozell formed the Media Research Center, an organization whose stated purpose is to identify liberal media bias.

In 1998, Bozell founded CNSNews.com, the website of the Conservative News Service (later Cybercast News Service) and several additional Media Research Center-affiliated websites. On its website, MRC publishes Bozell's syndicated columns, the CyberAlert daily newsletter documenting perceived media bias, and research reports on the news media.

In October 2006, Bozell founded the Culture and Media Institute, an MRC branch whose mission is to reduce what he claims to be a negative liberal influence on American morality, culture, and religious liberty.

==== Ghostwriting scandal ====
In February 2014, a former employee of the Media Research Center confirmed media reports that Bozell does not write his own columns or books and has relied on a Media Research Center colleague, Tim Graham, to write them "for years". Following revelation that Bozell does not write his own material, the Quad-City Times, a daily newspaper, announced that it was dropping Bozell's column, reporting that, "Bozell may have been comfortable representing others' work as his own. We're not. The latest disclosure convinces us Bozell has no place on our print or web pages." The Quad-City Times article appeared under the headline, "WANTED: A replacement for Brent Bozell".

Reports that Bozell did not write his own material were confirmed by his Media Research Center colleagues. On February 13, 2014, The Daily Beast reported, "Employees at the MRC were never under any illusion that Bozell had been writing his own copy. 'It's an open secret at the office that Graham writes Bozell's columns, and has done so for years,' said one former employee. In fact, an anonymous former MRC employee went so far as to tell The Daily Beast: 'I know for a fact that Bozell didn't even read any of the drafts of his latest book until after it had been sent to the publishers'."

Talking Points Memo reported on February 14, 2014 that, "Brent Bozell has staked much of his career on challenging what he sees as a lazy media establishment, all while reportedly collecting the profits from books and columns he never actually wrote." According to the report, "despite not actually writing any of the content, Bozell still collects 80-90 percent of the profits."

Richard S. Newcombe, the founder of Creators Syndicate who began syndicating Bozell’s column in 1991, said it was a total distortion to claim that Brent Bozell did not write his column. Newcombe said that after the syndicate had launched the column and it was appearing regularly in dozens of newspapers, Bozell asked if he and Tim Graham could have a joint byline since they were both writing the column. Newcombe said the syndicate was heavily invested in promoting Bozell and would add Graham’s name later. He said the blatantly false accusation that Bozell did not write his own column — because he co-wrote it with Graham all along — was corrected and the column appeared with a joint byline until Bozell stopped writing it in 2020.

The column that Bozell started today appears in 50 newspapers and websites with the sole byline of Tim Graham.

Newcombe said Creators Syndicate was encouraged by two heavyweights in the conservative movement to syndicate Bozell. Mary Lou Forbes, editorial page editor of The Washington Times, told the syndicate, "Brent Bozell is providing an invaluable service in exposing liberal bias in the media." William F. Buckley said, "There is no other column in syndication like it, and many of us conservatives rely heavily on the Media Research Center."

==== Parents Television Council ====
Bozell founded the Parents Television and Media Council in 1995, initially as a branch of the Media Research Center focusing on entertainment television, over concerns that decency was declining on prime-time television programming. The PTC's stated mission was "to promote and restore responsibility and decency to the entertainment industry."

During his tenure as PTC president, Bozell filed complaints with the FCC over what he alleged were indecent programs and attempted boycotts against advertisers on television programs the organization alleged were offensive. PTC was one of many organizations that filed complaints over the 2004 Super Bowl XXXVIII halftime show in which co-performer Justin Timberlake caused a brief exposure of Janet Jackson's right breast for which the FCC ultimately fined CBS. Excluding Super Bowl-related complaints, the vast majority of FCC complaints from 2003 to 2006 were found to have come from PTC.

In 2001, the PTC organized a mass advertiser boycott of the professional wrestling television program WWE SmackDown on UPN over claims that the program caused the deaths of young children whom the PTC felt were influenced by watching the program; in particular, the PTC cited the case of Lionel Tate, a 12-year-old Ft. Lauderdale boy who was arrested after murdering a 6-year-old girl. Tate's attorney claimed that he had accidentally killed her when he botched a professional wrestling move. It was ultimately determined that the girl had been stomped to death and had not been the victim of any professional wrestling move and was actually watching cartoons at the time the murder occurred. World Wrestling Federation (now World Wrestling Entertainment, or WWE) sued Bozell and his organization for libel. PTC's insurance carrier eventually chose to settle the case, paying $3.5 million to the WWE, and issuing a public apology.

In Bozell's mandated apology as part of settling the libel charges, Bozell said: "It was premature to reach that conclusion when we did, and there is now ample evidence to show that conclusion was incorrect. It was wrong to have stated or implied that WWE or any of its programs caused these tragic deaths."

=== Books ===
Bozell has authored and/or co-authored the following books:

- And That's the Way it Isn't: A Reference Guide to Media Bias (with Brent Baker) (1990)
- Weapons of Mass Distortion: The Coming Meltdown of the Liberal Media (2004)
- Whitewash: How The News Media Are Paving Hillary Clinton's Path to the Presidency (with Tim Graham) (2007)
- Collusion: How The Media Stole The 2012 Election And How To Stop Them From Doing It In 2016 (with Tim Graham) (2013)
- Unmasked: Big Media's War on Trump (with Tim Graham) (2019)

=== Second Trump administration ===
On January 22, 2025, Donald Trump said he would pick Bozell to run the U.S. Agency for Global Media. On March 14, President Trump issued an executive order that directed that the USAGM be eliminated "to the maximum extent consistent with applicable law", along with several other agencies. On March 25, Bozell's USAGM nomination was withdrawn and Bozell was nominated to be United States Ambassador to South Africa.

== Presidential politics ==
On December 22, 2011, Bozell appeared on a Fox News Channel segment. After being shown a clip in which an MSNBC journalist said that Republican candidate Newt Gingrich looked like a "car bomber", Bozell asked how media would react if someone said that President Barack Obama looked like a "skinny ghetto crackhead".

Bozell was an outspoken critic of Donald Trump during the 2016 Republican Party presidential primaries, describing him as "the greatest charlatan of them all," a "huckster," and a "shameless self-promoter". He said, "God help this country if this man were president."

After Trump clinched the Republican nomination, however, Bozell attacked the media for their alleged "hatred" of Trump. Politico noted, "The paradox here is that Bozell was once more antagonistic toward the president than any journalist." Bozell singled out Jake Tapper of CNN for being "one of the worst offenders" in coverage of Trump.

In August 2020, Bozell told a meeting of conservatives and donors that "leftists planned to steal this election." On January 6, after a mob of Trump supporters – including one of his sons – attacked the United States Capitol, Bozell appeared on Fox Business Network and denounced the riot, stating that "you can never countenance police being attacked. You cannot countenance our national Capitol being breached like this. I think it is absolutely wrong." Bozell also said that "Look, they are furious that they believe this election was stolen. I agree with them."

== Personal life ==
Bozell is married to Norma Petruccione. They live in Great Falls, Virginia, and have five children. Bozell has stated that contrary to speculation by some in the media, he is not officially a Republican.

Bozell was named the 1998 Alumnus of the Year at the University of Dallas. That same year, Grove City College named Bozell a Pew Memorial Lecturer.

Bozell's son, David Bozell, is director of an organization called ForAmerica, a conservative group active on social media, founded by Bozell III in 2010.

Bozell's other son, Leo Brent Bozell IV, participated in the January 6 United States Capitol attack; he entered the United States Senate chamber. Leo Brent Bozell IV faced federal charges of obstructing an official proceeding, entering a restricted building, and disorderly conduct. He was convicted in September 2023 of ten charges, including five felonies and was sentenced to 45 months in federal prison. His father told the judge that his son "is a good man" and that he would not "excuse the inexcusable behavior of his son". Bozell IV later received a full pardon from Trump.
