= Adolph Coors Foundation =

American foundation

- Formation: 1975
- Headquarters: Denver, Colorado, U.S.
- Leader: John Jackson
- Revenue: $40.8 million (2024)
- Expenses: $12.3 million (2024)
- Endowment: $207 million
- Website: www.coorsfoundation.org

The Adolph Coors Foundation was founded in 1975 with funds from the Adolph Coors Jr. Trust. Adolph Coors II was the son of the founder of the Coors Brewing Company in Golden, Colorado. The foundation has awarded $135.3 million USD since 1975. It focuses its efforts generally within the state of Colorado, but has also been used to fund national entities such as The Heritage Foundation.

In 1993, the foundation provided the endowment funds for the creation of the Castle Rock Foundation, which awards grants to causes throughout the United States. In part, the organization states that "All Americans are educated, particularly in the wisdom of the free enterprise system, traditional Judeo-Christian values and the rule of law."

== See also ==
- Donors Trust
