= Media Research Center =

Conservative media watchdog group based in Virginia

- Abbreviation: MRC
- Formation: October 1, 1987; 39 years ago
- Founder: L. Brent Bozell III
- Type: 501(c)(3) nonprofit
- Tax ID no.: 54-1429009
- Purpose: Allegations of liberal media bias
- Headquarters: Herndon, Virginia, U.S.
- Method: Editorials, online newsletters, reports, conservative activism, right-wing activism
- Revenue: $14.6 million (2025)
- Expenses: $12.9 million (2025)
- Website: www.mediaresearch.org

The Media Research Center (MRC) is an American conservative content analysis and media watchdog group based in Herndon, Virginia, and founded in 1987 by L. Brent Bozell III. The nonprofit MRC has received financial support primarily from Robert Mercer, but with several other conservative-leaning sources, including the Bradley, Scaife, Olin, Castle Rock and JM foundations, as well as ExxonMobil. It was described in 2018 as "one of the most active and best-funded, and yet least known" arms of the modern conservative movement in the United States.

== Foundation and funding ==
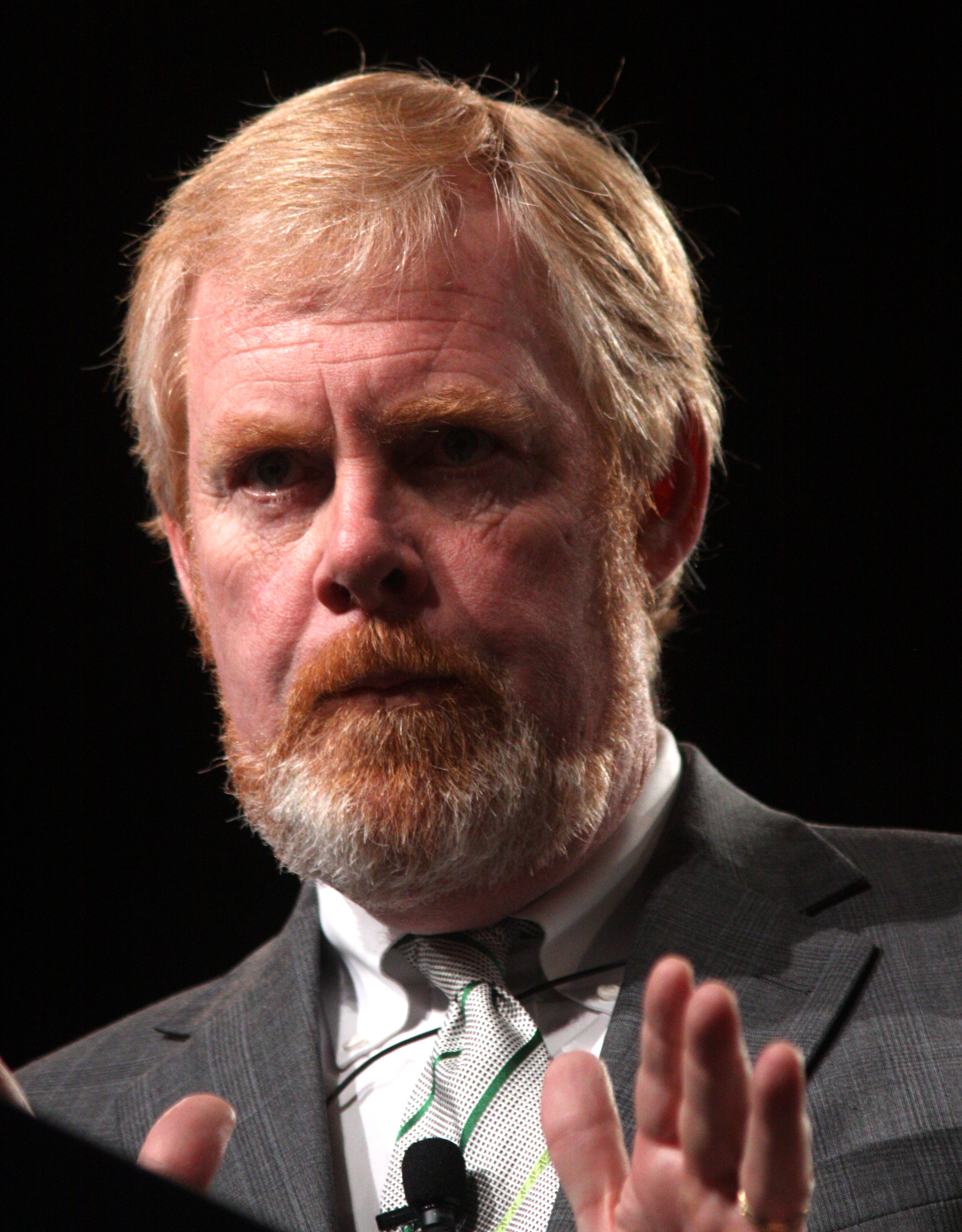
L. Brent Bozell III founded the Media Research Center in 1987.

Bozell and a group of other American conservatives founded MRC on October 1, 1987. Their initial budget was at US$339,000. Prior to founding the MRC, Bozell was the chairman of the National Conservative Political Action Committee; he resigned from that position a month before establishing MRC. A wealthy donor whose name has been kept anonymous helped set up the MRC.

The MRC has received financial support from several foundations, including the Bradley, Scaife, Olin, Castle Rock, Carthage and JM foundations. It also receives funding from ExxonMobil. The organization rejects the scientific consensus on climate change and criticizes media coverage that reflects the scientific consensus. The MRC received over $10 million from Robert Mercer, its largest single donor. As of its 2015 reporting to the IRS, the organization had revenue approaching $15 million and expenses in excess of $15 million. Bozell's salary during this year was reported as close to $345,000, with nearly $122,000 in additional compensation from the organization and related organizations.

== Projects ==
=== Reports on news media ===
Original logo of the Media Research Center from 1987 to 2012

From 1996 to 2009, the MRC published a daily online newsletter called CyberAlert written by editor Brent Baker. Each issue profiles what he perceives as biased or inaccurate reports about politics in the American news media. Prior to CyberAlert, MRC published such reports in a monthly newsletter titled MediaWatch, from 1988 to 1999. Media analysis articles are now under the banner BiasAlert. Media analysis director Tim Graham and research director Rich Noyes regularly write Media Reality Check, another MRC publication documenting alleged liberal bias. Notable Quotables is its "collection of the most biased quotes from journalists".

In Notable Quotables, editors give honors such as the "Linda Ellerbee Awards for Distinguished Reporting" based on the former CNN commentator, who Bozell considered "a liberal blowhard who has nothing to say". Other features on its website include the weekly syndicated news and entertainment columns written by founder Bozell. MRC staff members have also written editorials and books about their findings of the media. Bozell has written three books about the news media: And That's the Way it Isn't: A Reference Guide to Media Bias (1990, with Brent Baker); Weapons of Mass Distortion: The Coming Meltdown of the Liberal Media (2004); and Whitewash: How The News Media Are Paving Hillary Clinton's Path to the Presidency (2007, with Tim Graham). Research director Rich Noyes has also co-authored several published books.

=== MRC Business ===
In 1992, the MRC created the Free Market Project to promote the culture of free enterprise and combat what it believes is media spin on business and economic news. That division recently changed its name to the Business & Media Institute (www.businessandmedia.org) and later to MRC Business and is now focused on "Advancing the culture of free enterprise in America." BMI's advisory board included such well-known individuals as economists Walter Williams and Bruce Bartlett, as well as former CNN anchor David Goodnow. BMI is led by career journalist Dan Gainor, a former managing editor at CQ.com, the website for Congressional Quarterly. It released a research report in June 2006 covering the portrayal of business on prime-time entertainment television during the May and November "sweeps" periods from 2005. The report concluded that the programs, among them the long running NBC legal drama Law & Order, were biased against business. Another report of the BMI accused the networks of bias in favor of the Gardasil vaccine, a vaccine intended to prevent cervical cancer.

=== CNSNews ===
Bozell founded CNSNews (formerly Cybercast News Service) in 1998 to cover stories he believes are ignored by mainstream news organizations. CNSNews.com provides news articles for Townhall.com and other websites for a subscription fee. Its leadership consists of president Brent Bozell and editor Terry Jeffrey. Under editor David Thibault, CNSNews.com questioned the validity of the circumstances in which Democratic Rep. John Murtha received his Purple Hearts as a response to Murtha's criticisms of the U.S. War in Iraq. The Washington Post and Nancy Pelosi have commented that this approach is similar to the tactics of the Swift Vets and POWs for Truth, which opposed John Kerry's candidacy in the 2004 election.

=== NewsBusters ===
In the summer of 2005, Media Research Center launched NewsBusters, a website "dedicated to exposing & combating liberal media bias," in cooperation with Matthew Sheffield, a now-former conservative blogger (who now works at Salon.com) involved in the CBS Killian documents story. NewsBusters is styled as a rapid-response blog site that contains posts by MRC editors to selected stories in mass media. Although the site is advertised chiefly as a conservative site, it frequently defends neoconservatives as well. The site highlights journalists and non-journalists (writers, musicians, producers, scientists, etc.) perceived as having liberal viewpoints.

=== Research on entertainment ===
The MRC has produced research and analysis on the entertainment industry, as well. In May 1989, the MRC began publishing the newsletter TV, etc. Its mission, said Bozell in a 1992 lecture at The Heritage Foundation, was to "document the left-wing antics within the entertainment industry". TV, etc. attracted immediate attention in entertainment circles. As noted by Broadcasting magazine, the debut issue of TV, etc. was critical of primetime TV shows like The Golden Girls, Head of the Class, and thirtysomething for containing storylines or dialogue believed to be hostile to conservatives. Then at its annual convention in July 1989, the American Federation of Television and Radio Artists passed a resolution criticizing the MRC's newsletter.

A 1990 issue of TV, etc. published lyrics to the Todd Rundgren song "Jesse" that attacked Jesse Helms, Tipper Gore, and Pope John Paul II; Bozell also wrote to Warner Bros. Records urging the label not to include the song in Rundgren's upcoming album. TV, etc. also released annual lists of programs it deemed the "most biased". For the 1991–92 season, The Trials of Rosie O'Neill made the top of that list; other shows ranked included Captain Planet and the Planeteers, L.A. Law, and The Simpsons. In 1993, Bozell wrote a letter to NBC in support of its show Against the Grain as the show was struggling in ratings. Bozell praised Against the Grain for "staunch advocacy of education and gentle, respectful treatment of family life."

Following the 1994–95 television season, TV, etc. named the NBC made-for-TV movie Serving in Silence: The Margarethe Cammermeyer Story the most biased program of the season; others included Roseanne and The X-Files. In 1995, Bozell founded the Parents Television Council, with a focus on combatting indecency on television. In October 2006, the MRC created the Culture and Media Institute, the mission of which is "to advance, preserve, and help restore America's culture, character, traditional values, and morals against the assault of the liberal media." Robert H. Knight was the institute's first director. MRC VP Dan Gainor is now in charge of that department.

The CMI promoted its mission through editorials and research reports. In March 2007, the CMI published a "National Cultural Values Survey" and concluded from its results that most Americans perceived a decline in moral values. One study released by the organization in June 2007 claimed that television viewing time correlated directly with one's liberal attitude, even possibly degrading to moral attitudes. In 2008, it published a report detailing its opposition to reinstatement of the FCC fairness doctrine, a policy requiring broadcasters to present differing views on controversial issues of public import. The MRC claims the rule had been politically weaponized by the Kennedy and Johnson administrations to suppress conservative radio, before being abolished by a bipartisan FCC in 1987.

The CBS crime drama Cold Case has been twice criticized by the CMI for alleged anti-Christian prejudice in two episodes. In May 2008, CMI released another report, one that claimed a moral decline in "Dear Abby" columns. The CMI website remained online through the end of 2010, before it was folded in the Media Research Center website in 2011. In November 2014, the MRC renamed the institute MRC Culture.

=== Others ===
MRC sponsors MRCTV (formerly Eyeblast), a conservative-leaning YouTube-like video-hosting site. In 2018, the MRC started a new project in the Culture Department to monitor online censorship of conservatives called MRC TechWatch.

== Brent Bozell ghostwriting ==
In February 2014, former employees of the Media Research Center alleged that the center's founder L. Brent Bozell III does not write his own columns or books and instead has used a ghostwriter, Tim Graham, for years. The Daily Beast reported: "Employees at the MRC were never under any illusion that Bozell had been writing his own copy. 'It's an open secret at the office that Graham writes Bozell's columns, and has done so for years,' said one former employee. In fact, a former MRC employee went so far as to tell ... 'I know for a fact that Bozell didn't even read any of the drafts of his latest book until after it had been sent to the publishers.'" The Quad-City Times in Davenport, Iowa, dropped Bozell's column as a result, saying, "Bozell may have been comfortable representing others' work as his own. We're not. The latest disclosure convinces us Bozell has no place on our print or web pages."

== Viewpoints ==
In 2018, the MRC criticized journalist Katy Tur for introducing the issue of climate change into reporting on Hurricane Florence, while its director of media analysis bemoaned what he described as the use of "spin" to politicize media coverage of natural disasters. In 2017, MRC sponsored a conference by the Heartland Institute, an organization known for its effort to cast doubt about the scientific consensus on climate change. In November 2021, a study by the Center for Countering Digital Hate described MRC as being among "ten fringe publishers" that together were responsible for nearly 70 percent of Facebook user interactions with content that denied climate change. Facebook disputed the study's methodology.

In 2002, MRC said CNN was "[Fidel] Castro's megaphone". In 1999, the MRC said that network news programs on ABC, CBS, and NBC largely ignored Chinese espionage in the United States during the Clinton administration. In MRC reports released from 1993 to 1995, it was claimed that such programs made more references to religion each later year, most of which became more favorable. In 2003, the MRC urged advertisers to pull sponsorship from The Reagans, a miniseries about President Ronald Reagan to be shown on CBS. The network later moved the program to its co-owned premium cable network Showtime.

The MRC has been a critic of the video game industry, arguing that there is a link between violent videogames and real-world violence; in this capacity, they (along with the Parents Television Council, a subsidiary) were invited to President Donald Trump's 2018 summit on video games and gun violence. MRC released a report in 2007 claiming that the network morning shows devoted more airtime to covering Democratic presidential candidates than Republican ones for the 2008 election. Producers for such shows criticized the MRC's methodology as flawed. During the 2008 US presidential election, MRC claimed that the vast majority of news stories about Democratic presidential candidate Barack Obama had a positive slant. MRC president Bozell praised MSNBC for having David Gregory replace Chris Matthews and Keith Olbermann as political coverage anchor beginning September 8, 2008, but MSNBC president Phil Griffin disputed the statements by Bozell and others who have accused the network of liberal bias.

On December 22, 2011, MRC president Bozell appeared on Fox News and suggested U.S. president Barack Obama looked like a "skinny ghetto crackhead". Bozell was an outspoken critic of Donald Trump during the 2016 Republican primaries, describing him as "the greatest charlatan of them all", "a "huckster" and "shameless self-promoter". He said, "God help this country if this man were president." After Trump clinched the Republican nomination, Bozell attacked the media for their "hatred" of Trump. Politico noted, "The paradox here is that Bozell was once more antagonistic toward the president than any journalist." Bozell singled out Jake Tapper for being "one of the worst offenders" in coverage of Trump. However, several senior MRC staff told Politico that they considered Tapper a model of fairness, although that viewpoint has since changed.

== Reception ==
Extra!, the magazine of the progressive media watch group FAIR, criticized the MRC in 1998 for selective use of evidence. MRC had said that there was more coverage of government death squads in right-wing El Salvador than in left-wing Nicaragua in the 1980s, when Amnesty International stated El Salvador was worse than Nicaragua when it came to extrajudicial killings. Extra! also likened a defunct MRC newsletter, TV etc., which tracked the off-screen political comments of actors, to "Red Channels, the McCarthy Era blacklisting journal."

Journalist Brian Montopoli of Columbia Journalism Review in 2005 labeled MRC "just one part of a wider movement by the far right to demonize corporate media", rather than "make the media better." The Media Research Center has also faced scrutiny over the group's $350,000 purchase in 2012 of a Pennsylvania house that a top executive had been trying to sell for several years. In 2013, Media Research Center president Bozell appeared on Fox News to defend a Fox interview in which Fox journalists conducted almost no research into the background of Reza Aslan to prepare for its interview with him, and its putative biases.

When the Media Research Center bestowed an award named for William F. Buckley to Sean Hannity, Bret Stephens, a neoconservative columnist for The New York Times, wrote an editorial in which he lamented, "And so we reach the Idiot stage of the conservative cycle, in which a Buckley Award for Sean Hannity suggests nothing ironic, much less Orwellian, to those bestowing it, applauding it, or even shrugging it off. The award itself is trivial, but it's a fresh reminder of who now holds the commanding heights of conservative life, and what it is that they think." ThoughtCo named MRC one of the top 15 conservatives to follow on Twitter.

== See also ==
- Accuracy in Media
- Media Matters for America
- PR Watch
