= Omaha Walking Club =

Walking club in Nebraska

The Omaha Walking Club is a recreational hiking organization founded on March 30, 1919, in what is now Fontenelle Forest in Bellevue Nebraska. Established by a small group of walkers, it grew rapidly in its early years and became a long-standing social and outdoor institution in the Omaha area.

== Early history ==
=== Founding (1919) ===
The club originated at Coffin Springs in what is now Fontenelle Forest on March 30, 1919. Twenty-five men and women attended this first hike.

During the outing, Edwin Jewell, a recent arrival from Chicago, described The Prairie Club of Chicago, prompting the group to form a similar organization in Omaha. Officers were selected shortly afterward, and regular meetings were scheduled.

=== Early activities and membership growth ===
From its inception, the club organized weekly Sunday walks, pausing only during the hottest summer months. Most members reached the trailheads by streetcar, and when walks were scheduled outside Omaha, they extended their commute by interurban line or train to reach the starting point.

During its first year, the club organized weekly Sunday hikes throughout eastern Nebraska and western Iowa, led by a mix of early members and prominent local figures. Founding member Edith Tobitt led the inaugural walk at Fontenelle Forest, followed in subsequent weeks by leaders such as Dr. Harold Gifford Sr., Dr. Robert Fletcher Gilder, and other active members. The fall schedule featured additional notable leaders, including Leo Bozell, Judge J. W. Woodrough, and Roy N. Towl, who guided hikes to sites such as Child's Point, Ralston to Millard, and the Fontenelle Reserve. By the end of 1919, the club had completed more than two dozen organized walks and grown to 175 members.

=== The first clubhouse ("the shack") ===
In 1921, Dr. Harold Gifford Sr. gifted the club a three-room house near Wiley Point on land bordering what is now Fontenelle Forest. The building, known as "the shack," sat on land leased from Dr. Gifford. Club members E. M. Kennedy and Jim Baldwin, who later became known locally as a hermit, played a key role in refurbishing the structure. Baldwin later served as its caretaker. The shack burned down in May 1921.

=== Organizational development and a new clubhouse ===
By 1921, the club had formalized its structure, establishing committees for Membership, Walks, Camp, Vacation Outings, Photographs, and Conservation.

A new clubhouse, also referred to as "shack" was constructed later that year. The building was equipped with a circular fireplace surrounded with benches to accommodate 100. The grounds supported a variety of recreational activities, including volleyball, tennis, canoeing, and swimming in the Missouri River. Sleeping facilities were eventually added. On December 31, 1950, this second clubhouse was destroyed by fire.

== Later years ==
A replacement clubhouse was completed in September 1951. This structure served the club for more than four decades.

The club still exists as a nonprofit organization more than a century later.
