= Priscilla Buckley =

American journalist and author (1921–2012)

- Born: Priscilla Langford Buckley; October 17, 1921; New York City, U.S.
- Died: March 25, 2012 (aged 90); Sharon, Connecticut, U.S.
- Education: Smith College (BA)
- Occupations: Journalist; author
- Father: William F. Buckley Sr.
- Relatives: James L. Buckley (brother); William F. Buckley Jr. (brother); Patricia Buckley Bozell (sister); Reid Buckley (brother)

Priscilla Langford Buckley (October 17, 1921 – March 25, 2012) was an American journalist and author who was the longtime managing editor of National Review.

== Education ==
Buckley graduated with a degree in history in 1943 from Smith College, while there, one of her best friends was Betty Friedan. Nancy Reagan was in the same graduating class at Smith as Buckley.

== Work for the CIA ==
She worked for the CIA in the 1950s and for United Press from 1944 to 1948 (in New York) and again from 1953 to 1956 (in Paris).

== Work for National Review ==
Priscilla Buckley started working at William F. Buckley's publication, National Review, in 1956. She became managing editor of the publication in 1959 following the retirement of the publication's original managing editor, Suzanne La Follette. Whittaker Chambers recommended Buckley for the position. Buckley served as managing editor until 1985 and continued working at National Review until 1999. She worked at National Review for a total of 43 years. According to The New York Times, Buckley's influence at National Review led some to refer to the publication as "Miss Buckley’s Finishing School for Young Ladies and Gentlemen of Conservative Persuasion". Writers whom she helped to train include Paul Gigot, Bill McGurn, Mona Charen, and Anthony R. Dolan.

== Pro-life stance ==
Buckley was opposed to abortion and in the 1970s and 1980s served on the board for the Ad Hoc Committee in Defense of Life.

== Publications ==
Buckley authored String of Pearls, a 2001 memoir about international journalism, and a 2005 book entitled Living It Up with National Review: A Memoir.

== Personal life ==
Buckley was born in New York City. She was the third of 10 children of William Frank Buckley Sr., and Aloise Josephine Antonia Steiner. Buckley's siblings included future United States Senator and federal judge James L. Buckley and William F. Buckley Jr., a future conservative author. Her nickname was "Pitts".

== Later life and death ==
Buckley died of kidney failure on March 25, 2012, at the age of 90 at Great Elm, the house in Sharon, Connecticut, where she lived and where she and her siblings had grown up.
