= Reid Buckley =

American writer, speaker, and educator (1930–2014)

- Born: July 14, 1930; Paris, France
- Died: April 14, 2014 (aged 83); Columbia, South Carolina, U.S.
- Education: Yale University
- Occupations: Writer; speaker; educator
- Father: William F. Buckley Sr.
- Relatives: James L. Buckley (brother); William F. Buckley Jr. (brother); Christopher Buckley (nephew); L. Brent Bozell III (nephew)

Fergus Reid Buckley (July 14, 1930 – April 14, 2014) was an American writer, speaker, and educator. Buckley was the founder of The Buckley School of Public Speaking. Among his books is a history of his family, An American Family—The Buckleys (2008).

== Early life and education ==
Buckley was born in Paris, France, where his father, William F. Buckley Sr., was working in the oil industry. In 1952, he graduated from Yale University, where he was a member of Skull and Bones.

Buckley's older brothers were former New York Conservative United States Senator James L. Buckley, and conservative author and commentator William F. Buckley Jr., and his nephews were writer Christopher Buckley and Media Research Center founder L. Brent Bozell III.

== Career ==
Buckley was the founder of The Buckley School of Public Speaking.

== Death ==
Buckley died of cancer at a hospice in Columbia, South Carolina in April 2014, at age 83.

== Works ==
- Sex, Power and Pericles: Principles of Advanced Public Speaking. Peor Es Nada Press, 1997.
- Strictly Speaking: Reid Buckley’s Indispensable Handbook on Public Speaking. McGraw-Hill, 1999.
- USA Today: The Stunning Incoherence of American Civilization. P.E.N. Press, 2002.
- An American Family: The Buckleys. New York: Simon & Schuster, 2008.
- Speaking in Public: Buckley's Techniques for Winning Arguments and Getting Your Point Across. HarperCollins, 2010.
