= Leo B. Bozell =

American advertising executive

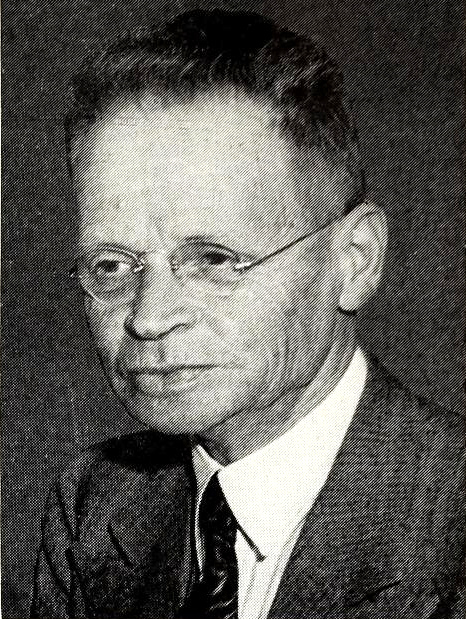
Leo B. Bozell

Leo Brent Bozell Sr. (/boʊˈzɛl/; October 13, 1886 – March 24, 1946) was an American advertising executive and civic leader. He co‑founded the advertising agency Bozell & Jacobs, later known as Bozell.

== Early life and education ==
Bozell was born in Mitchell County, Kansas to Clarinda J. (Wallis) and Oscar Bozell. He graduated from the University of Kansas in 1910 and began his career in journalism at the Wichita Eagle. In 1912 he moved to Omaha, Nebraska, where he worked as a reporter and later city editor for the Omaha Daily News.

== Career and public service ==
After serving in World War I, Bozell became the first secretary of the Omaha Real Estate Board. In 1921 he co-founded the advertising agency Bozell & Jacobs with Morris E. Jacobs. Headquartered in Omaha, the firm expanded to offices in Indianapolis, Seattle, Shreveport, Houston, and Dallas.

Bozell held leadership roles in several Omaha civic and business organizations. He served as commander of Omaha Post No. 1 of the American Legion and was part of the group that brought the 1925 national American Legion convention to Omaha. He was a member of the American Legion Airport Corporation, which helped establish Omaha's municipal airport.

He served as director and vice-president of the Omaha & Council Bluffs Street Railway Company and testified before the United States House of Representatives on matters related to the company. Bozell was also a member of the board of the Omaha Community Playhouse.

During the early 1940s he chaired the county Red Cross campaign (1940) and the Community Chest drive (1941). He served as vice-president of the Omaha Chamber of Commerce in 1942 and as its president in 1943. He was active in the Democratic Party, serving as county chairman in 1928 and chairman of the party's finance committee in 1930.

Bozell was a World War I veteran and later a lieutenant colonel in the Nebraska State Guard during World War II. He was also a vestryman at St. Barnabas Episcopal Church.

== Personal life ==
Bozell married Mildred Frances Cooper, a teacher, on June 20, 1917, at St. Barnabas Episcopal Church in Omaha. She died of pneumonia on June 11, 1918, several weeks after undergoing surgery. She was buried in her wedding gown, and colleagues from the Omaha Daily News, where Bozell was city editor, served as pallbearers.

In 1919, Bozell joined the Omaha Walking Club where he met Lois Robbins, a recent graduate of Smith College who was active in social settlement work. Robbins spent her summers as a counselor and swimming instructor at Camp Holliday near Lake Okoboji. The couple became engaged in 1920 and were married on August 20, 1921 in an outdoor ceremony at Camp Holliday before an audience of Camp Fire Girls. The wedding, originally planned for November, was moved to the summer at the urging of the campers. Robbins' sister Polly and Bozell's future business partner, Morris E. Jacobs, served as attendants.

Bozell and Robbins had three children: John, L. Brent, and Patricia. Their son L. Brent Bozell Jr. became a conservative activist and writer; their daughter-in-law Patricia Buckley Bozell and grandson L. Brent Bozell III were also authors.

== Death ==
Bozell died of a heart ailment at his home in Omaha on March 24, 1946, at age 59.
