= James L. Buckley =

American judge and politician (1923–2023)

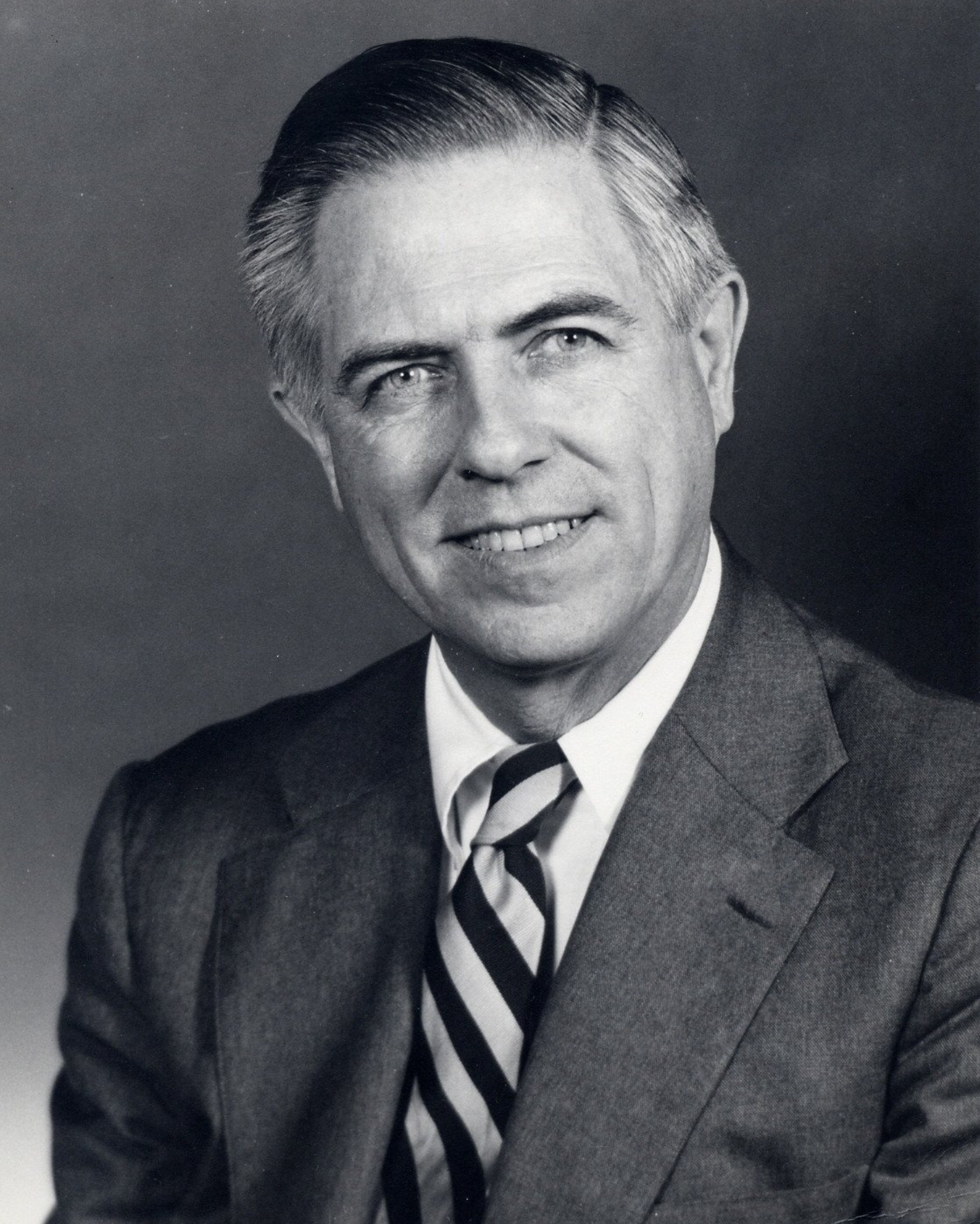
- Buckley in the 1970s

Senior Judge of the United States Court of Appeals for the District of Columbia Circuit
- In office August 31, 1996 – August 18, 2023

Judge of the United States Court of Appeals for the District of Columbia Circuit
- In office December 17, 1985 – August 31, 1996
- Appointed by: Ronald Reagan
- Preceded by: Edward Allen Tamm
- Succeeded by: John Roberts

21st Counselor of the Department of State
- In office September 9, 1982 – September 26, 1982
- President: Ronald Reagan
- Preceded by: Robert McFarlane
- Succeeded by: Ed Derwinski

6th Under Secretary of State for International Security Affairs
- In office February 28, 1981 – August 20, 1982
- President: Ronald Reagan
- Preceded by: Matthew Nimetz
- Succeeded by: William Schneider Jr.

United States Senator from New York
- In office January 3, 1971 – January 3, 1977
- Preceded by: Charles Goodell
- Succeeded by: Daniel Patrick Moynihan

Personal details
- Born: James Lane Buckley; March 9, 1923 New York City, U.S.
- Died: August 18, 2023 (aged 100) Washington, D.C., U.S.
- Party: Conservative (until 1976) (Note: Though elected to the U.S. Senate as a member of the Conservative Party, Buckley caucused with Senate Republicans during his term.); Republican (from 1976)
- Spouse: Ann Cooley (m. 1953; died 2011)
- Children: 6
- Parent: William F. Buckley Sr. (father)
- Relatives: William F. Buckley Jr. (brother); Reid Buckley (brother); Priscilla Buckley (sister); Patricia Buckley Bozell (sister); Christopher Buckley (nephew); L. Brent Bozell III (nephew); William F. B. O'Reilly (nephew)
- Education: Yale University (BA, LLB)

Military service
- Branch/service: United States Navy
- Years of service: 1942–1946
- Rank: Lieutenant (junior grade)
- Battles/wars: World War II; Pacific War; Battle of Leyte; Invasion of Lingayen Gulf; Battle of Okinawa

James Lane Buckley (March 9, 1923 – August 18, 2023) was an American politician, jurist, diplomat, and author. Buckley served in the United States Senate as a member of the Conservative Party of New York State, held multiple positions within the Reagan administration, and served as a judge of the United States Court of Appeals for the District of Columbia Circuit. He was a brother of prominent conservative author and commentator William F. Buckley Jr.

Buckley defeated incumbent Republican U.S. Senator Charles Goodell and Democratic U.S. Representative Richard Ottinger in the 1970 U.S. Senate election as the nominee of the Conservative Party of New York State. He served in the Senate from 1971 to 1977; Democrat Daniel Moynihan defeated him in 1976. Buckley also ran for the U.S. Senate in the 1980 United States Senate election in Connecticut, but was defeated by Democrat Chris Dodd. During the first Reagan administration, Buckley served as Undersecretary of State for International Security Affairs. He was also President of Radio Free Europe/Radio Liberty from 1982 to 1985.

Buckley was nominated by President Ronald Reagan to a seat on the United States Court of Appeals for the District of Columbia Circuit on October 16, 1985. On December 17, 1985, he was confirmed by the U.S. Senate and received his commission. Buckley assumed senior status in 1996. He had the distinction of having held a constitutional office in each of the three branches of the American federal government.

== Early life, education, family, and early career ==
James Lane Buckley was born on March 9, 1923, in Manhattan, New York City, to Aloise Steiner and William Frank Buckley Sr., the fourth of ten children to the couple. Because his father spoke Spanish to the Buckley children when Buckley was very young, Buckley learned Spanish before he learned English. He was the older brother of the late conservative writer William F. Buckley Jr. and the uncle of Christopher Taylor Buckley. He was also the uncle of Brent Bozell III and political consultant William F. B. O'Reilly. His mother, from New Orleans, was of Swiss-German, German, and Irish descent, while his paternal grandparents, from Hamilton, Ontario, Canada, were of Irish ancestry.

Buckley attended Millbrook School. He earned a Bachelor of Arts degree in English from Yale University in 1943; at Yale, he was a member of Skull and Bones. Buckley enlisted in the United States Navy in 1942. During World War II, he participated in the battles of Leyte, Lingayen Gulf, and Okinawa. Buckley was discharged with the rank of Lieutenant (junior grade) in 1946. After receiving his Bachelor of Laws from Yale Law School in 1949, he was admitted to the bar of Connecticut in 1950 and practiced law until 1953, when he joined The Catawba Corporation as vice president and director. In 1965, he managed his brother's campaign for Mayor of New York. Meanwhile, in May 1953, he married Ann Frances Cooley, with whom he had six children. She died on December 30, 2011.

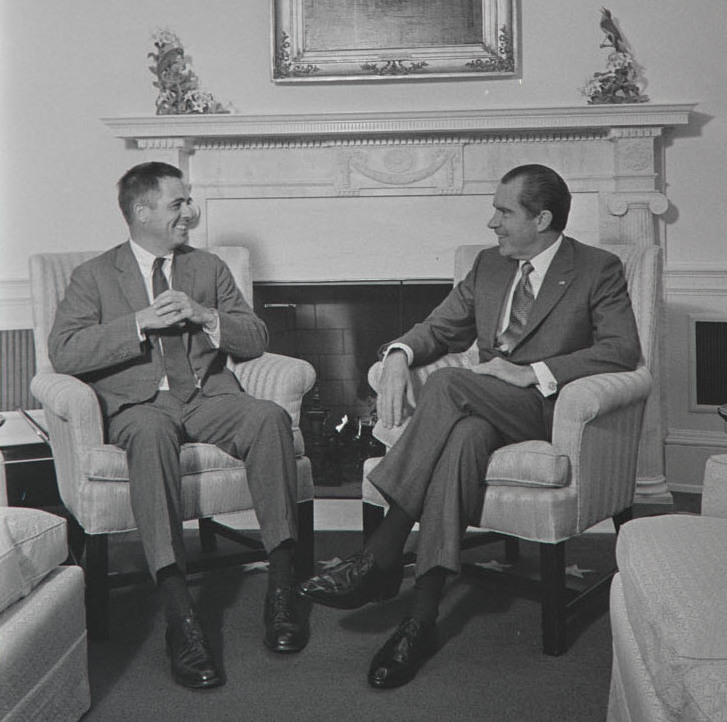
With President Richard Nixon on November 6, 1970

== United States Senate ==
=== Elections ===
==== 1968 ====
In 1968, Buckley ran for the senatorial nomination of the Conservative Party of New York State, after his brother William F. Buckley Jr. had served as the party's mayoral nominee in the 1965 New York City mayoral election. Buckley won the party's nomination on April 2, 1968, with the unanimous support of all forty state committeemen. Buckley placed third in the general election behind Republican nominee Jacob Javits and Democratic nominee Paul O'Dwyer after receiving 1,139,402 votes (17.31%).

==== 1970 ====
U.S. Senator Robert F. Kennedy was assassinated by Sirhan Sirhan in Los Angeles, California on June 6, 1968. Kennedy's death left a vacancy in the United States Senate that would be filled through an appointment by Governor Nelson Rockefeller. On September 10, Rockefeller appointed Charles Goodell, a Republican member of the House of Representatives from the 38th congressional district, to fill the vacancy. Goodell sought election to a full term in 1970.

On April 6, 1970, Buckley announced that he would seek the Conservative Party's senatorial nomination again. The Conservative State Committee convened inside Hotel McAlpin in Manhattan on April 7, 1970, to select the party's nominee in the general election. Kevin P. McGovern attempted to force a primary campaign between himself and Buckley, but failed to receive the 25% of delegate votes necessary for a primary. Buckley received nearly ninety percent of the delegate votes and the remainder were split between McGovern and abstaining delegates.

On June 20, F. Clifton White, Buckley's campaign manager, announced that Buckley's campaign would circulate petitions in an attempt to gain another ballot line named the Independent Alliance Party. Enough valid signatures were collected to gain the additional ballot line, but New York Secretary of State John P. Lomenzo ruled that the Independent Alliance's emblem, an outline of New York with Buckley's name inside, was illegal as New York's election law limited the number of times that a candidate's name could appear on a ballot line to one. Lomenzo later allowed the party onto the ballot after the emblem was changed to a shield with the letter "I" inside.

Buckley ran as a conservative. Both Goodell and Democrat Richard Ottinger were liberal candidates who opposed the Vietnam War. The liberalism of the two major-party candidates gave Buckley an opening. In the general election, Buckley prevailed with 39% of the vote. According to The New York Times, "the political cognoscenti were stunned" by Buckley's unexpected victory.

==== 1976 ====
In 1971, Buckley spoke to the Republican National Finance committee about running for reelection in the 1976 elections with the Republican nomination. Peter A. Peyser challenged him in the Republican primary, but Buckley prevailed. Buckley gained Nelson Rockefeller's support by agreeing to not support Ronald Reagan's campaign against Gerald Ford in the Republican presidential primaries. Running on the Republican and Conservative lines, Buckley lost the general election to Democratic nominee Daniel Patrick Moynihan by a margin of 54% to 45%.

==== 1980 ====
After Democratic U.S. Senator Abraham Ribicoff opted not to seek re-election, Buckley ran for U.S. Senate from Connecticut as a Republican in 1980. In the Republican primary, he defeated Connecticut State Senator Richard Bozzuto. In the general election, he was defeated by Democrat Chris Dodd, 56% to 43%.

=== Tenure ===
During his tenure in the United States Senate Buckley's political affiliation was referred to as Conservative-Republican of New York (C-R-N.Y). The Republican caucus in the Senate voted 36 to 3 in favor of admitting Buckley into their caucus, with Senators Jacob Javits, John Sherman Cooper, and William B. Saxbe all opposing Buckley's admittance to the caucus.

In 1971, Buckley was appointed to the air and water pollution, roads, and economic development sub-committees within the United States Senate Committee on Environment and Public Works. Buckley supported Richard Nixon during the 1972 presidential election and called for the Conservative Party, which had not supported Nixon during the 1968 presidential election, to support Nixon in the 1972 election.

In 1974, Buckley proposed a Human Life Amendment to the U.S. Constitution. If passed, the Amendment would have defined the term "person" in the Fourteenth Amendment to include the embryo.

Buckley's enacted legislation includes the Family Educational Rights and Privacy Act (FERPA) that governs use of student records and the Protection of Pupils' Rights Act (PPRA) which requires parent notification, right to review, and consent for administration of student surveys to minors if the survey collects information on any of eight specified topics.

In the spring of 1974, with the Watergate scandal continuing to grow in magnitude and seriousness, Buckley surprised and, in some cases, angered some of his allies among Republicans when he called upon the increasingly-embattled Richard M. Nixon to voluntarily resign the presidency. Buckley said that in doing so, he was making no judgment as to Nixon's technical legal guilt or innocence of the accusations made against him and in fact denounced those "in and out of the media who have been exploiting the Watergate affair so recklessly" in what he called an effort "to subvert the decisive mandate of the 1972 election." However, he said that the burgeoning scandal might result in an impeachment process that would tear the country even further apart and so he declared: "There is one way and one way only by which the crisis can be resolved, and the country pulled out of the Watergate swamp. I propose an extraordinary act of statesmanship and courage—an act at once noble and heartbreaking; at once serving the greater interests of the nation, the institution of the Presidency, and the stated goals for which he so successfully campaigned"—Nixon's resignation. Buckley was the first major conservative figure to call for resignation. Nixon did not resign at that time but eventually did lose the support of key Republican figures, including Senator Barry Goldwater. Nixon ultimately resigned on August 9, 1974.

Buckley was the lead petitioner in a landmark Supreme Court case, Buckley v. Valeo (1976), which "shaped modern campaign-finance law".

== 1976 'Draft Buckley' movement ==
During the 1976 Republican National Convention, then-Senator Jesse Helms encouraged a "Draft Buckley" movement in an effort to stop the nomination of Ronald Reagan for president. (Reagan had announced that Pennsylvania Senator Richard Schweiker would be his running mate; Helms objected to this decision, believing Schweiker to be too liberal.) The "Draft Buckley" movement was rendered moot when President Gerald Ford narrowly won the party's nomination on the first ballot.

== Post-Senate business career ==
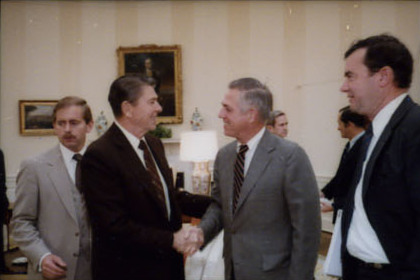
With President Ronald Reagan on November 3, 1982

After his loss in the 1976 election, Buckley worked for Donaldson, Lufkin & Jenrette, becoming a member of the executive committee and of its board of directors and eventually advancing to the position of corporate director.

== Reagan administration ==
After his 1980 loss in Connecticut's U.S. Senate election, Buckley served in the Reagan administration, first as an undersecretary of State for security assistance, managing military aid to strategically located countries, and then as President of Radio Free Europe/Radio Liberty in Munich from 1982 to 1985.

== United States Court of Appeals for the District of Columbia Circuit ==
On October 16, 1985, Buckley was nominated by President Ronald Reagan to a seat on the United States Court of Appeals for the District of Columbia Circuit. The seat had previously been held by Judge Edward Allen Tamm. Buckley was confirmed by the United States Senate on December 17, 1985, and received his commission on December 17, 1985. He assumed senior status on August 31, 1996.

== Later life and death ==
Buckley became the oldest living former elected U.S. senator upon the death of Fritz Hollings in April 2019 and became the oldest living former U.S. senator upon the death of Jocelyn Burdick in December 2019.

Buckley turned 100 on March 9, 2023. He died from injuries suffered in a fall, in Washington, D.C. on August 18, 2023, at age 100.

== Political positions ==
Buckley introduced and led the passage of the Family Educational Rights and Privacy Act. In 2010, however, he publicly supported amending the law because college athletic departments were using it to hide sexual abuse allegations.

Buckley voted against a minimum wage increase in 1974.

Buckley was one of eight senators to vote against the Equal Rights Amendment.

During the 2016 presidential election Buckley was critical of Democratic nominee Hillary Clinton and Republican nominee Donald Trump. He stated that his brother William and Ronald Reagan would have been shocked by Trump's actions. He suggested that he mostly agreed with Libertarian nominee Gary Johnson.

== Electoral history ==
1970 Conservative Party United States Senate ballot
Party	Candidate	Votes	%	±%
Conservative	James L. Buckley	379.1	89.14%	
Conservative	Kevin P. McGovern	35.8	8.42%	
Conservative	Abstention	10.4	2.45%	
Total votes		425.3	100.00%	

1970 New York United States Senate election
Party	Candidate	Votes	%	±%
Conservative	James L. Buckley	2,179,640	36.91%	+34.33%
Independent Alliance	James L. Buckley	108,550	1.84%	+1.84%
Total	James L. Buckley	2,288,190	38.75%	+36.17%
Democratic	Richard Ottinger	2,171,232	36.77%	−18.74%
Republican	Charles Goodell (incumbent)	1,178,679	19.96%	−17.74%
Liberal	Charles Goodell (incumbent)	225,793	3.82%	−0.34%
Total	Charles Goodell (incumbent)	1,434,472	24.29%	−13.41%
Communist	Arnold Johnson	4,097	0.07%	+0.07%
Socialist Workers	Kipp Dawson	3,549	0.06%	+0.01%
Socialist Labor	John Emanuel	3,204	0.05%	−0.04%
Total votes		5,904,744	100.00%	

1976 U.S. Senate election in New York
Party	Candidate	Votes	%	±%
Democratic	Pat Moynihan	3,238,511	51.26%	
Liberal	Pat Moynihan	184,083	2.91%	
Total	Pat Moynihan	3,422,594	54.17%	
Republican	James L. Buckley (incumbent)	2,525,139	39.96%	
Conservative	James L. Buckley (incumbent)	311,494	4.93%	
Total	James L. Buckley (incumbent)	2,836,633	44.89%	N/A
Communist	Herbert Aptheker	25,141	0.40%	▲0.37
Socialist Workers	Marcia Gallo	16,350	0.26%	▲0.20
Libertarian	Martin E. Nixon	10,943	0.17%	▲0.17
U.S. Labor	Elijah C. Boyd	6,716	0.11%	▲0.11
Total votes		6,318,377	100.00%	
Democratic gain from Republican				

Connecticut United States Senate election, 1980
Party	Candidate	Votes	%
Democratic	Chris Dodd	763,969	56.34%
Republican	James Buckley	581,884	42.91%
Libertarian	Jerry Brennan	5,336	0.39%
Concerned Citizens	Andrew J. Zemel	4,772	0.35%
Write-in	All others	114	0.01%
Total votes		1,356,075	100.00%
Democratic hold			

== Publications ==
- If Men Were Angels: A View from the Senate (1975)
- Gleanings from an Unplanned Life (2006)
- Freedom at Risk: Reflections on Politics, Liberty, and the State (2010)
- Saving Congress from Itself: Emancipating the States & Empowering Their People (2014)

== Works cited ==
- Moore, John; Preimesberger, Jon; Tarr, David, eds. (2001). Congressional Quarterly's Guide to U.S. Elections. Congressional Quarterly. ISBN 1568026021.

U.S. Senate
Preceded by Charles Goodell	United States Senator (Class 1) from New York; 1971–1977; Served alongside: Jacob Javits	Succeeded by Daniel Patrick Moynihan
Party political offices
Preceded by Kieran O'Doherty	Conservative nominee for U.S. Senator from New York (Class 3); 1968	Succeeded by Barbara Keating
Preceded by Henry Paolucci	Conservative nominee for U.S. Senator from New York (Class 1); 1970, 1976	Succeeded by Florence M. Sullivan
Preceded by Charles Goodell	Republican nominee for U.S. Senator from New York (Class 1); 1976	Succeeded by Florence M. Sullivan
Preceded by James Brannen	Republican nominee for U.S. Senator from Connecticut (Class 3); 1980	Succeeded by Roger Eddy
Political offices
Preceded by Matthew Nimetz	Undersecretary of State for International Security Affairs; 1981–1982	Succeeded by William Schneider Jr.
Preceded by Robert McFarlane	Counselor of the Department of State; 1982	Succeeded by Ed Derwinski
Legal offices
Preceded by Edward Allen Tamm	Judge of the United States Court of Appeals for the District of Columbia Circuit; 1985–1996	Succeeded by John Roberts
Honorary titles
Preceded by Jocelyn Burdick	Oldest Living United States Senator (Sitting or former); 2019–2023	Succeeded by Daniel J. Evans
