= William F. Buckley Jr. =

American conservative author and commentator (1925–2008)

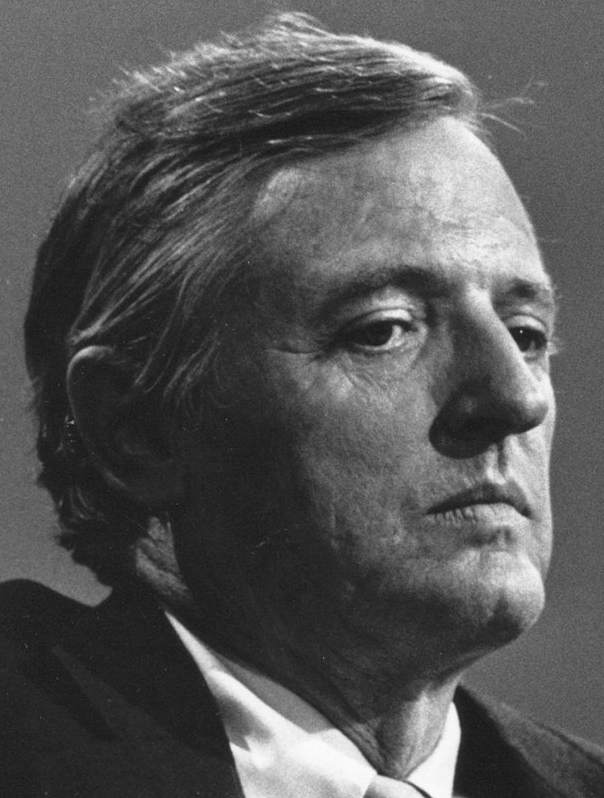
- Buckley in the 1970s
- Born: William Francis Buckley; November 24, 1925; New York City, New York, U.S.
- Died: February 27, 2008 (aged 82); Stamford, Connecticut, U.S.
- Education: Yale University (BA)
- Occupations: Editor; author; political commentator
- Spouse: Patricia Taylor Buckley (m. 1950; died 2007)
- Children: Christopher Buckley
- Parent: William F. Buckley Sr.
- Relatives: James L. Buckley (brother); Priscilla Buckley (sister); Patricia Buckley Bozell (sister); Reid Buckley (brother); L. Brent Bozell III (nephew); William F. B. O'Reilly (nephew)
- Writing career
- Genres: Non-fiction; spy thriller; travel
- Subjects: Politics; anti-communism
- Notable work: God and Man at Yale
- Movement: American conservatism
- Military career
- Branch: United States Army
- Service years: 1944–1946
- Rank: First lieutenant
- Conflicts: World War II
- Buckley's voice Excerpt of Buckley's speech as part of Suffolk University's Lowell Lecture Series; Recorded March 31, 1992

William Frank Buckley Jr. (born William Francis Buckley; (Note: "William Francis" in the editorial obituary "Up from Liberalism", The Wall Street Journal, February 28, 2008, p. A16; Martin, Douglas, "William F. Buckley Jr., 82, Dies; Sesquipedalian Spark of Right", obituary, The New York Times, February 28, 2008, which reported that his parents preferred "Frank", which would make him a "Jr.", but at his christening, the priest "insisted on a saint's name, so Francis was chosen. When the younger William Buckley was five, he asked to change his middle name to Frank, and his parents agreed. At that point, he became William F. Buckley, Jr.") November 24, 1925 – February 27, 2008) was an American conservative writer, public intellectual, political commentator, and novelist.

Born in New York City, Buckley spoke Spanish as his first language before learning French and then English as a child. He served stateside in the United States Army during World War II. After the war, he attended Yale University, where he engaged in debate and conservative political commentary; he graduated from Yale with honors in 1950. He then worked at the Central Intelligence Agency for two years.

In 1955, Buckley founded National Review, a magazine that stimulated the growth and development of the conservative movement in the United States. In addition to editorials in National Review, Buckley wrote God and Man at Yale (1951) and more than 50 other books on diverse topics including writing, speaking, history, politics, and sailing. His works include a series of novels featuring fictitious CIA officer Blackford Oakes and a nationally syndicated newspaper column.

In 1965, Buckley ran for mayor of New York City on the Conservative Party line, finishing third. From 1966 to 1999, he hosted 1,429 episodes of the public affairs television show Firing Line, the longest-running public affairs show with a single host in U.S. television history; through his work on the show, he became known for his Northeastern elite accent, articulate discourse, and wide vocabulary.

Buckley is widely considered one of the most influential figures in the conservative movement in the United States.

== Early life ==
=== Childhood ===
William Frank Buckley Jr. was born William Francis Buckley in New York City on November 24, 1925, to Aloise Josephine Antonia (née Steiner; 1895–1985) and lawyer and oil developer William Frank Buckley Sr. (1881–1958). His mother hailed from New Orleans and was of German, Irish, and Swiss-German descent, while his father had Irish ancestry and was born in Texas to Canadian parents from Hamilton, Ontario. He had five older siblings and four younger siblings.

As a boy, Buckley moved with his family to Mexico before moving to Sharon, Connecticut. He began his formal schooling in France, attending first grade in Paris. By the time Buckley was seven, the family had moved to England, where he received his first formal English-language training at a day school in London. Due to the family's varied places of residence, his first and second languages were Spanish and French.

As a boy, Buckley developed a love for horses, hunting, music, sailing, and skiing, all of which are reflected in his later writings. He was homeschooled through the eighth grade using the homeschool curriculum developed by the Calvert School in Baltimore. Just before World War II, when he was 12 and 13, he attended the Jesuit preparatory school St John's Beaumont School in the English village of Old Windsor.

Buckley's father was an oil developer whose wealth was based in Mexico and became influential in Mexican politics during the military dictatorship of Victoriano Huerta, but was expelled when leftist general Álvaro Obregón became president in 1920. Buckley's nine siblings included eldest sister Aloise Buckley Heath, a writer and conservative activist; sister Maureen Buckley-O'Reilly, who married Richardson-Vicks Drugs CEO Gerald A. O'Reilly; sister Priscilla Buckley, author of Living It Up with National Review: A Memoir, for which Buckley wrote the foreword; sister Patricia Buckley Bozell, also an author; brother Reid Buckley, an author and founder of the Buckley School of Public Speaking; and brother James L. Buckley, who became a U.S. senator from New York and a judge of the United States Court of Appeals for the D.C. Circuit.

During the war, Buckley's family took in the English historian-to-be Alistair Horne as a child war evacuee. He and Buckley remained lifelong friends. They both attended the Millbrook School in Millbrook, New York, graduating in 1943. Buckley was a member of the American Boys' Club for the Defense of Errol Flynn (ABCDEF) during Flynn's trial for statutory rape in 1943.

At Millbrook, Buckley founded and edited the school's yearbook, The Tamarack; this was his first experience in publishing. When Buckley was a young man, libertarian author Albert Jay Nock was a frequent guest at the Buckley family house in Sharon, Connecticut. William F. Buckley Sr. urged his son to read Nock's works, the best-known of which was Our Enemy, the State, in which Nock maintains that the founding fathers of the United States, at their Constitutional Convention in 1787, executed a coup d'état of the system of government established under the Articles of Confederation.

=== Music ===
In his youth, Buckley developed many musical talents. He played the harpsichord, later calling it "the instrument I love beyond all others", but said he was not "proficient enough to develop my own style". He was a close friend of harpsichordist Fernando Valenti, who offered to sell Buckley his 16-foot pitch harpsichord. Buckley was also an accomplished pianist and appeared once on Marian McPartland's NPR show Piano Jazz. A great admirer of Johann Sebastian Bach, Buckley wanted Bach's music played at his funeral.

=== Religion ===
Buckley was raised a Catholic and was a member of the Knights of Malta. He was committed to Catholic devotionals, including praying the Rosary daily.

The 1951 release of his first book, God and Man at Yale, was met with some specific criticism pertaining to his Catholicism. McGeorge Bundy, dean of Harvard at the time, wrote in The Atlantic, "it seems strange for any Roman Catholic to undertake to speak for the Yale religious tradition". Henry Sloane Coffin, a Yale trustee, wrote that the book was "distorted by his Roman Catholic point of view" and that Buckley "should have attended Fordham or some similar institution".

In his 1997 book Nearer, My God, Buckley condemned what he viewed as "the Supreme Court's war against religion in the public school" and argued that Christian faith was being replaced by "another God [...] multiculturalism". He disapproved of the liturgical reforms following the Second Vatican Council, writing of the loss of the Latin Mass: "I pray the sacrifice will yield a rich harvest of informed Christians. But to suppose that it will is the most difficult act of faith I have ever been called upon to make, because it tears against the perceptions of all my senses."

== Education and military service ==
Buckley attended the National Autonomous University of Mexico (or UNAM) until 1943. The next year, upon his graduation from the U.S. Army Officer Candidate School (OCS), he was commissioned as a second lieutenant in the United States Army. In his book Miles Gone By, he briefly recounts being a member of Franklin Roosevelt's honor guard upon Roosevelt's death. He served stateside throughout the war at Fort Benning, Georgia; Fort Gordon, Georgia; and Fort Sam Houston, Texas.

After the war ended in 1945, Buckley enrolled at Yale University, where he became a member of the secret Skull and Bones society and was a masterful debater. He was an active member of the Conservative Party of the Yale Political Union, and served as chairman of the Yale Daily News and as an informer for the FBI. At Yale, Buckley studied political science, history, and economics and graduated with honors in 1950. He excelled in the Yale Debate Association; under the tutelage of Yale professor Rollin G. Osterweis, Buckley honed his acerbic style.

== Early career ==
Buckley remained at Yale working as a Spanish instructor from 1947 to 1951.

=== Central Intelligence Agency ===
Buckley served in the CIA for two years, including one year in Mexico City working on political action for E. Howard Hunt, who was later imprisoned for his part in the Watergate scandal. The two officers remained lifelong friends and Buckley was the godfather of three of Hunt's children. Buckley said that while he worked for the CIA, Hunt, his immediate boss, was the only other CIA employee he knew and that William Sloane Coffin exposed Buckley's CIA employment. While stationed in Mexico, Buckley edited The Road to Yenan, a book by Peruvian author Eudocio Ravines. After leaving the CIA, Buckley worked as an editor at The American Mercury in 1952, but left after perceiving newly emerging antisemitic tendencies in the magazine.

=== First books ===
==== God and Man at Yale ====
Buckley's first book, God and Man at Yale, was published in 1951. In it, Buckley argues that Yale University had strayed from its original mission.

One critic viewed the work as miscasting the role of academic freedom. The American academic and commentator McGeorge Bundy, also a Yale alumnus, wrote in The Atlantic: "God and Man at Yale, written by William F. Buckley, Jr., is a savage attack on that institution as a hotbed of 'atheism' and 'collectivism.' I find the book is dishonest in its use of facts, false in its theory, and a discredit to its author."

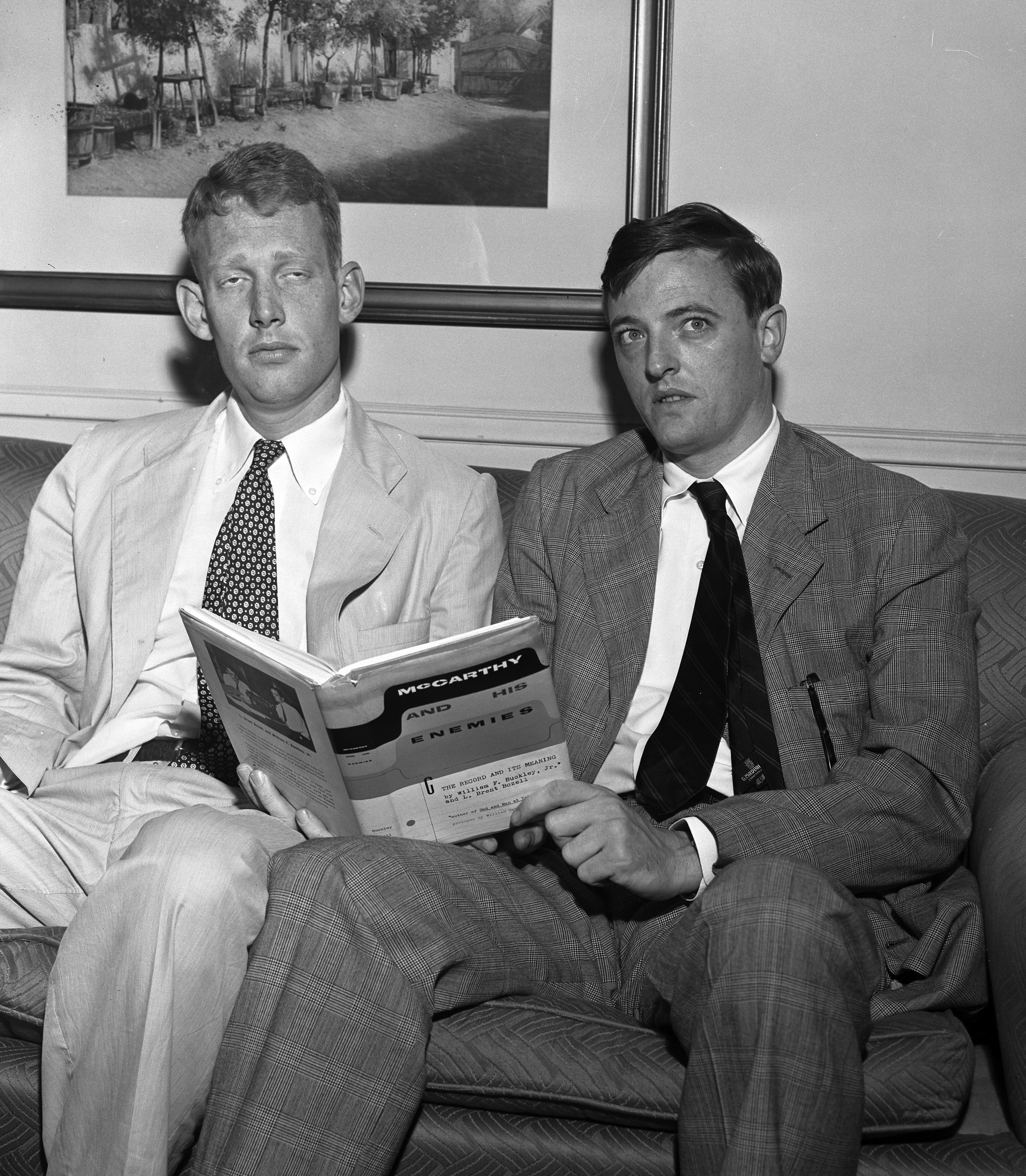
Buckley (right) and L. Brent Bozell Jr. promote their book McCarthy and His Enemies, 1954.

Buckley credited the attention the book received to its "Introduction" by John Chamberlain, saying that it "chang[ed] the course of his life" and that the famous Life magazine editorial writer had acted out of "reckless generosity". Buckley was referred to in Richard Condon's 1959 novel The Manchurian Candidate as "that fascinating younger fellow who had written about men and God at Yale."

==== McCarthy and His Enemies ====
In 1954, Buckley and his brother-in-law L. Brent Bozell Jr. co-authored a book, McCarthy and His Enemies. Bozell worked with Buckley at The American Mercury in the early 1950s when it was edited by William Bradford Huie. The book defended Senator Joseph McCarthy as a patriotic crusader against communism, and asserted that "McCarthyism ... is a movement around which men of good will and stern morality can close ranks." Buckley and Bozell described McCarthy as responding to a communist "ambition to occupy the world". They conceded that he was often "guilty of exaggeration", but believed the cause he pursued was just.

== National Review ==
Buckley founded National Review in 1955 at a time when few publications were devoted to conservative commentary. He served as the magazine's editor-in-chief until 1990. During that time, National Review became the standard-bearer of American conservatism, promoting the fusionism of traditional conservatives and libertarians. Examining postwar conservative intellectual history, Kim Phillips-Fein writes:

The most influential synthesis of the subject remains George H. Nash's The Conservative Intellectual Tradition since 1945 .... He argued that postwar conservatism brought together three powerful and partially contradictory intellectual currents that previously had largely been independent of each other: libertarianism, traditionalism, and anticommunism. Each particular strain of thought had predecessors earlier in the twentieth (and even nineteenth) centuries, but they were joined in their distinctive postwar formulation through the leadership of William F. Buckley Jr. and National Review. The fusion of these different, competing, and not easily reconciled schools of thought led to the creation, Nash argued, of a coherent modern Right.

Buckley sought out intellectuals who were ex-Communists or had once worked on the far Left, including Whittaker Chambers, Willi Schlamm, John Dos Passos, Frank Meyer, and James Burnham, as editors and writers for National Review. When Burnham became a senior editor, he urged the adoption of a more pragmatic editorial position that would extend the influence of the magazine toward the political center. Smant (1991) finds that Burnham overcame sometimes heated opposition from other members of the editorial board (including Meyer, Schlamm, William Rickenbacker, and the magazine's publisher, William A. Rusher), and had a significant impact on both the magazine's editorial policy and the thinking of Buckley himself.

Upon turning 65 in 1990, Buckley retired from the day-to-day running of National Review. He relinquished his controlling shares of National Review in June 2004 to a pre-selected board of trustees. The next month, he published the memoir Miles Gone By. Buckley continued to write his syndicated newspaper column, as well as opinion pieces for National Review magazine and National Review Online. He remained the ultimate source of authority at the magazine and also conducted lectures and gave interviews.

=== Defining the boundaries of conservatism ===
Buckley and his editors used National Review to define the boundaries of conservatism and to exclude people, ideas, or groups they considered unworthy of the conservative title. For example, Buckley denounced Ayn Rand, the John Birch Society, George Wallace, racists, white supremacists, and antisemites.

When he first met Ayn Rand, according to Buckley, she greeted him with the following: "You are much too intelligent to believe in God." In turn, Buckley felt that "Rand's style, as well as her message, clashed with the conservative ethos". He decided that Rand's hostility to religion made her philosophy unacceptable to his understanding of conservatism. After 1957, he attempted to weed her out of the conservative movement by publishing Whittaker Chambers's highly unfavorable review of Rand's Atlas Shrugged.

In 1964, Buckley wrote of "her desiccated philosophy's conclusive incompatibility with the conservative's emphasis on transcendence, intellectual and moral" and "the incongruity of tone, that hard, schematic, implacable, unyielding, dogmatism that is in itself intrinsically objectionable, whether it comes from the mouth of Ehrenburg, Savonarola—or Ayn Rand." Garry Wills and M. Stanton Evans also wrote critiques of Rand. Nevertheless, historian Jennifer Burns argues, Rand's popularity and influence on the right forced Buckley and his circle to reconsider how traditional notions of virtue and Christianity could be integrated with all-out support for capitalism.

In 1962, Buckley denounced Robert W. Welch Jr. and the John Birch Society in National Review as "far removed from common sense" and urged the Republican Party to purge itself of Welch's influence. He hedged the statement by insisting that among them were "some of the most morally energetic, self-sacrificing, and dedicated anti-Communists in America."

==== On Robert Welch and the John Birch Society ====
In 1952, their mutual publisher Henry Regnery introduced Buckley to Welch. Both became editors of political journals, and both had a knack for communication and organization. Welch launched his publication One Man's Opinion in 1956 (renamed American Opinion in 1958), one year after the founding of The National Review. Welch twice donated $1,000 to Buckley's magazine, and Buckley offered to give Welch's publication "a little publicity". Both believed the United States suffered from diplomatic and military setbacks during the early years of the Cold War, and both were staunchly anti-communist. But Welch expressed doubts about Eisenhower's loyalties in 1957, and the two disagreed on the reasons for the United States' perceived failure in the Cold War's early years.

According to Alvin S. Felzenberg, the disagreements between Buckley and Welch blossomed into "a major battle" in 1958. That year, Boris Pasternak won the Nobel Prize in Literature for his novel Doctor Zhivago. Buckley was impressed by the novel's vivid and depressing depictions of life in a communist society, and considered the CIA's smuggling of the novel into the Soviet Union an ideological victory. In September 1958, Buckley ran a review of Doctor Zhivago by John Chamberlain. In November, Welch sent Buckley and other associates copies of his unpublished manuscript The Politician, which accused Eisenhower and several of his appointees of involvement in a communist conspiracy. When Buckley returned the manuscript to Welch, he commented that the allegations were "curiously—almost pathetically optimistic". On December 9, Welch founded the John Birch Society with a group of business leaders in Indianapolis. By the end of 1958, Welch had both the organizational and the editorial infrastructure to launch his subsequent far-right political advocacy campaigns.

In 1961, reflecting on his correspondences with Welch and Birchers, Buckley told someone who subscribed to both the National Review and the John Birch Society: "I have had more discussions about the John Birch Society in the past year than I have about the existence of God or the financial difficulties of National Review."

=== Buckley rule ===
The Buckley rule is that National Review "will support the rightwardmost viable candidate" for a given office. Buckley first stated the rule during the 1964 Republican primary election featuring Barry Goldwater and Nelson Rockefeller. The rule is often misquoted and misapplied as proclaiming support for "the rightwardmost electable candidate", or simply the most electable candidate.

According to National Review's Neal B. Freeman, the Buckley rule meant that National Review would support "somebody who saw the world as we did. Somebody who would bring credit to our cause. Somebody who, win or lose, would conservatize the Republican party and the country. It meant somebody like Barry Goldwater."

=== Starr Broadcasting Group ===
Buckley was the chairman of Starr Broadcasting Group, a company that owned radio and TV stations throughout the U.S. in which he owned a 20% stake. Peter Starr was the company's president, and his brother Michael Starr was executive vice president. In February 1979, the US Securities and Exchange Commission accused Buckley and 10 other defendants of defrauding shareholders in Starr Broadcasting Group. As part of a settlement, Buckley agreed to return $1.4 million in stock and cash to shareholders in the company. The other defendants were ordered to contribute $360,000. In 1981, there was another agreement with the SEC.

== Other political commentary and action ==
In 1953–1954, long before he founded Firing Line, Buckley was an occasional panelist on the conservative public affairs program Answers for Americans broadcast on ABC and based on material from the H. L. Hunt–supported publication Facts Forum.

=== On the Right ===
Buckley's column On the Right was syndicated by Universal Press Syndicate beginning in 1962. From the early 1970s, his twice-weekly column was distributed regularly to more than 320 newspapers across the country. He authored 5,600 editions of the column, which totaled over 4.5 million words.

=== Firing Line ===
For many Americans, Buckley's erudition on his weekly PBS show Firing Line (1966–1999) was their primary exposure to him and his manner of speech, often with vocabulary common in academia, but unusual on television.

=== Young Americans for Freedom ===
In 1960, Buckley helped form Young Americans for Freedom (YAF). The YAF was guided by principles Buckley called "The Sharon Statement". Buckley was proud of the successful campaign of his older brother, Jim Buckley, on the Conservative Party ticket to capture the United States Senate seat from New York State held by incumbent Republican Charles Goodell in 1970, giving very generous credit to the activist support of the New York State chapter of YAF. Buckley served one term in the Senate, then lost to Democrat Daniel Patrick Moynihan in 1976.

=== Edgar Smith murder case ===
In 1962, Edgar Smith, who had been sentenced to death for the murder of 15-year-old high-school student Victoria Ann Zielinski in New Jersey, began a correspondence with Buckley from death row. As a result of the correspondence, Buckley began to doubt Smith's guilt. Buckley later said the case against Smith was "inherently implausible". An article by Buckley about the case, published in Esquire in November 1965, drew national media attention:

Smith said he told [friend Don Hommell] during their brief conversation ... on the night of the murder just where he had discarded his pants. The woman who occupies property across the road from which Smith claimed to have thrown the pants ... swore at the trial that she had seen Hommell rummaging there the day after the murder. The pants were later found [by the police] near a well-travelled road .... Did Hommell find them, and leave them in the other location, thinking to discredit Smith's story, and make sure they would turn up?

Buckley's article brought renewed media interest in Hommell, who Smith claimed was the real killer. In 1971, there was a retrial. Smith took a plea deal and was freed from prison that year. Buckley interviewed him on Firing Line soon thereafter.

In 1976, five years after being released from prison, Smith attempted to murder another woman, this time in San Diego, California. After witnesses corroborated the story of Lisa Ozbun, who survived being stabbed by Smith, he was sentenced to life in prison. He admitted at the trial that he had in fact also murdered Zielinski. Buckley subsequently expressed great regret at having believed Smith and supported him. Friends of Buckley said he was devastated and blamed himself for what happened.

=== New York City mayoral candidacy ===
In 1965, Buckley ran for mayor of New York City as the nominee of the new Conservative Party. He ran to restore momentum to the conservative cause in the wake of Goldwater's defeat. He tried to take votes away from the relatively liberal Republican candidate and Yale alumnus John Lindsay, who later became a Democrat.

Buckley did not expect to win; when asked what he would do if he won the race, he responded, "Demand a recount." He used an unusual campaign style. During one televised debate with Lindsay, Buckley declined to use his allotted rebuttal time and instead replied, "I am satisfied to sit back and contemplate my own former eloquence."

During his campaign, Buckley supported many policies that have been perceived as uniquely and unusually progressive. He supported affirmative action, being one of the first American conservatives to endorse a "kind of special treatment [of African Americans] that might make up for centuries of oppression". Buckley also espoused welfare reform to emphasize job training, education, and daycare. He criticized the administration's drug laws and judicial sentencing, and promised to crack down on trade unions that discriminated against minorities. This is considered notable, as his political opponents on the left would have resisted anything that alienated trade union-affiliated voters.

To relieve traffic congestion, Buckley proposed charging drivers a fee to enter the central city and creating a network of bike lanes. He opposed a civilian review board for the New York City Police Department, which Lindsay had recently introduced to control police corruption and install community policing. Buckley finished third with 13.4% of the vote, possibly having inadvertently aided Lindsay's election by taking votes from Democratic candidate Abe Beame.

=== Feud with Gore Vidal ===
When asked if there was one person with whom Buckley would not share a stage, Buckley named Gore Vidal. Vidal's antagonism toward Buckley was well known, even before 1968. Nevertheless, Buckley appeared in a series of televised debates with Vidal during the 1968 Republican National Convention in Miami and the Democratic National Convention in Chicago.

In their penultimate debate on August 28, Buckley and Vidal disagreed over the actions of the Chicago Police Department and the protesters at the convention. In reference to the response of the police involved in supposedly taking down a Viet Cong flag, moderator Howard K. Smith asked whether raising a Nazi flag during World War II would have elicited a similar response.

Vidal responded that people were free to state their political views as they saw fit, whereupon Buckley interrupted and noted that people were free to speak their views, but others were also free to ostracize them for holding those views, noting that in the US during World War II "some people were pro-Nazi and they were well [i.e. correctly] treated by those who ostracized them—and I'm for ostracizing people who egg on other people to shoot American Marines and American soldiers. I know you [Vidal] don't care because you have no sense of identification with—". Vidal then interjected, "the only sort of pro- or crypto-Nazi I can think of is yourself", whereupon Smith said, "Now let's not call names". Visibly angered, Buckley rose several inches from his seat and replied, "Now listen, you queer, stop calling me a crypto-Nazi or I'll sock you in your goddamn face, and you'll stay plastered."

Buckley later apologized in print for having called Vidal a "queer" in a burst of anger rather than in a clinical context, but also reiterated his distaste for Vidal as an "evangelist for bisexuality": "The man who in his essays proclaims the normalcy of his affliction, and in his art the desirability of it, is not to be confused with the man who bears his sorrow quietly. The addict is to be pitied and even respected, not the pusher." The debates are chronicled in the 2015 documentary Best of Enemies.

This feud continued in Esquire magazine, which commissioned essays from Buckley and Vidal on the incident. Buckley's essay "On Experiencing Gore Vidal" was published in the August 1969 issue. In September, Vidal responded with his own essay, "A Distasteful Encounter with William F. Buckley". In it Vidal strongly implied that, in 1944, Buckley's unnamed siblings and possibly Buckley, had vandalized a Protestant church in their Sharon, Connecticut, hometown after the pastor's wife sold a house to a Jewish family. He also implied that Buckley was homosexual and called him "racist, antiblack, anti-Semitic and a pro-crypto Nazi." Buckley sued Vidal and Esquire for libel; Vidal countersued Buckley for libel, citing Buckley's characterization of Vidal's novel Myra Breckinridge as pornography. After Buckley received an out-of-court settlement from Esquire, he dropped the suit against Vidal. Both cases were dropped, with Buckley settling for court costs paid by Esquire, which had published the piece, while Vidal, who did not sue the magazine, absorbed his own court costs. Neither paid the other compensation. Buckley also received an editorial apology from Esquire as part of the settlement.

The feud was reopened in 2003 when Esquire republished the original Vidal essay as part of a collection titled Esquire's Big Book of Great Writing. After further litigation, Esquire agreed to pay $65,000 to Buckley and his attorneys, to destroy every remaining copy of the book that included Vidal's essay, to furnish Buckley's 1969 essay to anyone who asked for it, and to publish an open letter stating that Esquire's current management was "not aware of the history of this litigation and greatly [regretted] the re-publication of the libels" in the 2003 collection.

Buckley maintained a philosophical antipathy toward Vidal's other bête noire, Norman Mailer, calling him "almost unique in his search for notoriety and absolutely unequalled in his co-existence with it." Meanwhile, Mailer called Buckley a "second-rate intellect incapable of entertaining two serious thoughts in a row." After Mailer's 2007 death, Buckley wrote warmly about their personal acquaintance.

=== Associations with liberal politicians ===
Buckley became a close friend of liberal Democratic activist Allard K. Lowenstein. He featured Lowenstein on numerous Firing Line programs, publicly endorsed his candidacies for Congress, and delivered a eulogy at his funeral.

Buckley was also a friend of economist John Kenneth Galbraith and former senator and presidential candidate George McGovern, both of whom he frequently featured or debated on Firing Line and college campuses. He and Galbraith occasionally appeared on The Today Show, where host Frank McGee introduced them and then stepped aside and deferred to their verbal thrusts and parries.

=== Amnesty International ===
In the late 1960s, Buckley joined the board of directors of Amnesty International USA. He resigned in January 1978 in protest over the organization's stance against capital punishment as expressed in its Stockholm Declaration of 1977, which he said would lead to the "inevitable sectarianization of the amnesty movement".

== Viewpoints ==
=== Political candidates ===
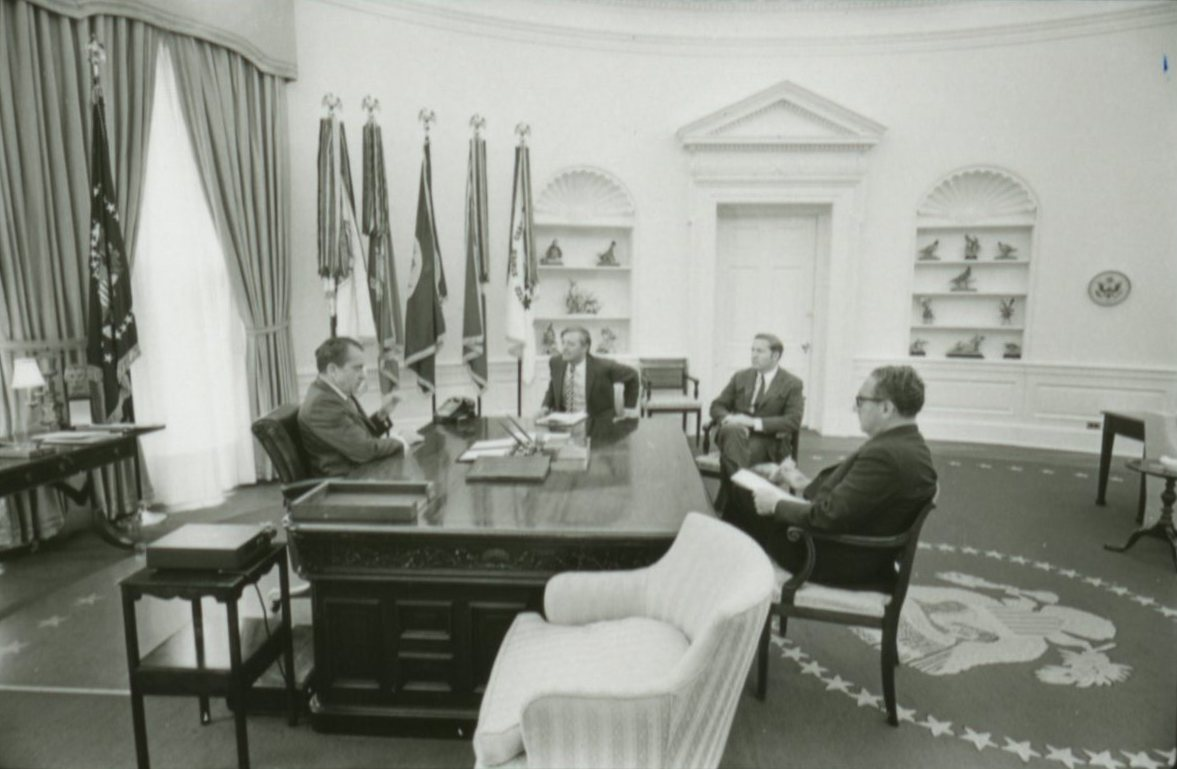
Buckley with President Richard Nixon, Henry Kissinger, and Frank Shakespeare in 1970

In 1963 and 1964, Buckley mobilized support for the candidacy of Senator Barry Goldwater, first for the Republican nomination against New York Governor Nelson Rockefeller, and then for the presidency. He used National Review as a forum to mobilize support for Goldwater.

In 1971, Buckley assembled a group of conservatives to discuss the domestic and foreign policies of Richard Nixon that the group opposed. In August 1969, Nixon had proposed and later attempted to enact the Family Assistance Plan (FAP), welfare legislation that would establish a national income floor of $1,600 per year for a family of four.

On the international front, Nixon negotiated talks with the Soviet Union and initiated relations with China, which Buckley, as a hawk and anti-communist, opposed. The group, known as the Manhattan Twelve, included National Review's publisher William A. Rusher and editors James Burnham and Frank Meyer. Other organizations represented were the newspaper Human Events, The Conservative Book Club, Young Americans for Freedom, and the American Conservative Union.

On July 28, 1971, the group published a letter announcing that its members no longer supported Nixon. The letter read, "In consideration of his record, the undersigned, who have heretofore generally supported the Nixon Administration, have resolved to suspend our support of the Administration." Nonetheless, in 1973, the Nixon administration appointed Buckley as a delegate to the United Nations, about which Buckley later wrote a book.

In 1976, Buckley supported Ronald Reagan's primary campaign against sitting President Gerald Ford and expressed disappointment at Reagan's narrow loss.

In 1981, Buckley informed President-elect Reagan that he would decline any official position offered to him. Reagan jokingly replied that was too bad, because he had wanted to make Buckley ambassador to (then Soviet-occupied) Afghanistan. Buckley later wrote, "When Ronald Reagan offered me the ambassadorship to Afghanistan, I said, 'Yes, but only if you give me fifteen divisions of bodyguards'."

In 1988, Buckley organized a committee to campaign against U.S. Senator Lowell Weicker, a liberal Republican. He endorsed Weicker's Democratic opponent, Connecticut Attorney General Joseph Lieberman.

=== Race and segregation ===
The central question that emerges ... is whether the White community in the South is entitled to take such measures as are necessary to prevail, politically and culturally, in areas where it does not predominate numerically? The sobering answer is Yes—the White community is so entitled because, for the time being, it is the advanced race.

— William F. Buckley Jr., National Review, August 1957

In the 1950s and early 1960s, Buckley opposed federal civil rights legislation and expressed support for continued racial segregation in the South.

In Freedom Is Not Enough: The Opening of the American Workplace, author Nancy MacLean writes that National Review made James J. Kilpatrick—a prominent supporter of segregation in the South—"its voice on the civil rights movement and the Constitution, as Buckley and Kilpatrick united North and South in a shared vision for the nation that included upholding white supremacy".

In the August 24, 1957, issue of National Review, Buckley's editorial "Why the South Must Prevail" spoke out explicitly in favor of temporary segregation in the South until "long term equality could be achieved". He wrote that temporary segregation in the South was necessary because the black population lacked the education, economic, and cultural development to make racial equality possible.

Buckley wrote that the white South had "the right to impose superior mores for whatever period it takes to effect a genuine cultural equality between the races". He said white Southerners were "entitled" to disenfranchise black voters "because, for the time being, it is the advanced race." Buckley characterized blacks as distinctly ignorant: "The great majority of the Negroes of the South who do not vote do not care to vote, and would not know for what to vote if they could."

Two weeks after that editorial was published, another prominent conservative writer, L. Brent Bozell Jr. (Buckley's brother-in-law), wrote in the National Review: "This magazine has expressed views on the racial question that I consider dead wrong, and capable of doing great hurt to the promotion of conservative causes. There is a law involved, and a Constitution, and the editorial gives White Southerners leave to violate them both in order to keep the Negro politically impotent."

Buckley visited South Africa in the 1960s on several paid fact-finding missions in which he distributed publications that supported the South African government's policy of apartheid. On January 15, 1963, the day after George Wallace, the white supremacist governor of Alabama, made his "Segregation Forever" inaugural address, Buckley published a feature essay in National Review on his recent "South African Fortnight", concluding it with these words concerning apartheid: "I know it is a sincere people's effort to fashion the land of peace they want so badly."

In his report, Buckley tried to define apartheid and came up with four axioms on which the policy stands, the fourth being "The notion that the Bantu could participate in power on equal terms with the whites is the worst kind of ideological and social romance". After publishing this defense of the Hendrik Verwoerd government, Buckley wrote that he was "bursting with pride" over the West German social critic Wilhelm Röpke's praise of the piece.

According to Politico, Buckley's writing grew more accommodating of the civil rights movement during the Lyndon B. Johnson administration. In his columns, he "ridiculed practices designed to keep African Americans off the voter registration rolls", "condemned proprietors of commercial establishments who declined service to African Americans in violation of the recently enacted 1964 Civil Rights Act", and showed "little patience" for "Southern politicians who incited racial violence and race-baited in their campaigns".

According to Politico, the turning point for Buckley was when white supremacists set off a bomb in a Birmingham church on September 15, 1963, resulting in the deaths of four African American girls. A biographer said that Buckley wept when he found out about the incident.

Buckley disagreed with the idea of structural racism and placed substantial blame for lack of economic growth on the black community itself, most prominently during a highly publicized 1965 debate at the Cambridge Union with African-American writer James Baldwin, in which Baldwin carried the floor vote 544 to 164.

In a 1966 episode of Firing Line with William F. Buckley Jr., "Civil Rights and Foreign Policy", guest Floyd Bixler McKissick was asked whether black power and other concepts could damage black contributions. McKissick focused in his answer on defining black power: "first of all we mean that black people simply got to determine for themselves the rate of progress, the direction of that progress. And there are six basic ingredients to the accomplishment of black power, and black power is a direction through which you can obtain total equality. And those six points are as follows: One, black people have got to secure for themselves political power. Two, black people have to secure for themselves economic power. Three, black people have got to develop and improve self-image of themselves...Leaving that particular point and going to point four, we'll have to develop militant leadership. And five, we seek enforcement of federal laws, the abolishment of police brutality and the abolishment of police-state tactics, as is in the South. And six, and last, what we mean by black power is the building and acquiring of a black consumer block...if we do not have all basic ingredients that we have talked about we'll never achieve the road to total equality."

In response to a question about McKissick's answer, Buckley said: "I endorse all six of those objectives." He reiterated this support on "What's Happening Mr. Silver" in 1968, saying: "I believe in black power, by the way...I think that black power understood as the organization of the Negro community in order to press for justice and press for opportunity is most desirable." Buckley also opposed the segregationist 1968 presidential candidate George Wallace, debating against Wallace's platform on a January 1968 episode of Firing Line.

Buckley later said he wished National Review had been more supportive of civil rights legislation in the 1960s. He grew to admire Martin Luther King Jr. and supported the creation of Martin Luther King Jr. Day. Buckley anticipated that the US could elect an African American president within a decade as of the late 1960s and said such an event would be a "welcome tonic for the American soul" that he believed would confer the same social distinction and pride upon African Americans that Catholics had felt upon John F. Kennedy's election.

In 2004, Buckley told Time, "I once believed we could evolve our way up from Jim Crow. I was wrong. Federal intervention was necessary." The same year, he endeavored to clarify his earlier comments on race, saying, "the point I made about white cultural supremacy was sociological." Buckley also linked his usage of the word "advancement" to its usage in the name NAACP, saying that the "call for the 'advancement' of colored people presupposes they are behind. Which they were, in 1958, by any standards of measurement."

=== Opposition to antisemitism ===
During the 1950s, Buckley worked to remove antisemitism from the conservative movement and barred antisemites from working for National Review.

When Norman Podhoretz demanded that the conservative movement banish paleoconservative columnists Patrick Buchanan and Joseph Sobran, who, according to cultural critic Jeffrey Hart, had promulgated a "a neoisolationist nativism tinged with anti-Semitism", Buckley would have none of it, and wrote that Buchanan and Sobran (a colleague of Buckley and formerly a senior editor of National Review) were not antisemitic, but anti-Israel.

In 1991, Buckley wrote a 40,000-word article criticizing Buchanan. He wrote, "I find it impossible to defend Pat Buchanan against the charge that what he did and said during the period under examination amounted to anti-Semitism", but concluded: "If you ask, do I think Pat Buchanan is an anti-Semite, my answer is he is not one. But I think he's said some anti-Semitic things."

Conservative Roger Scruton wrote: "Buckley used the pages of the National Review to distance conservatism from antisemitism and from any other kind of racial stereotyping. The important goal, for him, was to establish a believable stance towards the modern world, in which all Americans, whatever their race or background, could be included, and which would uphold the religious and social traditions of the American people, as well as the institutions of government as the Founders had conceived them."

Buckley's friendship with Ira Glasser, a Jewish American and former executive director of the American Civil Liberties Union, features in the 2020 film Mighty Ira.

Buckley's father, William F. Buckley Sr., "despised Jews with an intensity he made no effort to conceal", according to his son's biographer, Sam Tanenhaus. When Jane Buckley began dating Buckley's college roommate Tom Guinzburg, Buckley Sr. told his son, "We don't want a Jew in this family", and Buckley pressured Guinzburg to end the relationship. Later in life, he told Tanenhaus, "to marry a Jew was dumb."

=== Foreign policy ===
Buckley's opposition to communism extended to support for the overthrow and replacement of leftist governments by nondemocratic forces. Buckley admired Spanish dictator General Francisco Franco, who led the rightist military rebellion in its military defeat of the Spanish Republic, and praised him effusively in his magazine, National Review.

In his 1957 "Letter From Spain", Buckley called Franco "an authentic national hero", who "above others" had the qualities needed to wrest Spain from "the hands of the visionaries, ideologues, Marxists and nihilists" who had been democratically elected. Buckley also wrote: "however preferable Franco is to Indalecio Prieto, or to anarchy, he is not—at least not all by himself—a legitimate governor of Spain....Franco did not, in virtue of his heroism in the thirties, earn the right to govern absolutely in the fifties."

Buckley supported the military dictatorship of General Augusto Pinochet, who led the 1973 coup that overthrew Chilean president Salvador Allende's democratically elected Marxist government; Buckley called Allende "a president who was defiling the Chilean constitution and waving proudly the banner of his friend and idol, Fidel Castro." In 2020, the Columbia Journalism Review uncovered documents that implicated Buckley in a media campaign by the Argentina military junta promoting the regime's image while covering up the Dirty War.

Buckley expressed unfavorable views of Africa and critiqued the nationalist movements against Western colonialism of the 1960s. In 1962, he called African nationalism "self-discrediting" and said "the time is bound to come when" Westerners "realize what is the nature of the beast". In 1961, when asked when Africans would be ready for self-government, he replied, "When they stop eating each other".

Of the Iraq War, Buckley said, "The reality of the situation is that missions abroad to effect regime change in countries without a bill of rights or democratic tradition are terribly arduous." He added: "This isn't to say that the Iraq war is wrong, or that history will judge it to be wrong. But it is absolutely to say that conservatism implies a certain submission to reality; and this war has an unrealistic frank and is being conscripted by events."

In a February 2006 column published at National Review Online and distributed by Universal Press Syndicate, Buckley wrote, "One cannot doubt that the American objective in Iraq has failed" and "it's important that we acknowledge in the inner councils of state that [the war] has failed, so that we should look for opportunities to cope with that failure."

=== Marijuana ===
Buckley supported the legalization of marijuana and some other drug legalization as early as his 1965 candidacy for mayor of New York City. But in 1972, he said that while he supported removing criminal penalties for using marijuana, he also supported cracking down on trafficking marijuana.

Buckley wrote a pro-marijuana-legalization piece for National Review in 2004 in which he called for conservatives to change their views on legalization, writing, "We're not going to find someone running for president who advocates reform of those laws. What is required is a genuine republican groundswell. It is happening, but ever so gradually. Two of every five Americans [...] believe 'the government should treat marijuana more or less the same way it treats alcohol: It should regulate it, control it, tax it, and make it illegal only for children.'"

=== Gay rights and abortion ===
Buckley strongly opposed gay marriage, but supported the legalization of homosexual relations.

In a March 18, 1986, New York Times op-ed, Buckley addressed the AIDS epidemic. Calling it "a fact" that AIDS is "the special curse of the homosexual", he argued that people infected with HIV should marry only if they agreed to sterilization and that universal testing—led by insurance companies, not the government—should be mandatory.

Most controversially, he wrote: "Everyone detected with AIDS should be tattooed in the upper forearm, to protect common-needle users, and on the buttocks, to prevent the victimization of other homosexuals." The piece led to much criticism; some gay activists advocated boycotting Patricia Buckley's fundraising efforts for AIDS. Buckley later backtracked from the piece, but in 2004 he told The New York Times Magazine: "If the protocol had been accepted, many who caught the infection unguardedly would be alive. Probably over a million."

Buckley generally opposed abortion rights, saying, "Women who...procreate illegitimate births are not the best judges of right and wrong". He supported overturning Roe v. Wade, arguing that states should be allowed to ban abortion. In 1971, Buckley debated Betty Friedan on abortion.

=== Economics ===
Buckley was a self-proclaimed Georgist. During a 1985 episode of Firing Line, he addressed incentives for companies to move to New York City, saying: "I think this city has been occasionally guilty of everything, just to begin with. In the second place, the locational problem is, of course, easily solved by any Georgist, and I am one."

Subsequent reports in the National Review suggested that Buckley had later identified as a "closeted Georgist". In 2000, Buckley said he had been "beaten down" by fellow "right-wing theorist and intellectual friends" from advocating for a single tax on land rent.

== Language and idiolect ==
Buckley was well known for his command of language. He came late to formal instruction in English, not learning it until he was seven years old, and having earlier learned Spanish and French.

In Slate, Michelle Tsai wrote that he spoke English with an idiosyncratic accent between an old-fashioned Northeastern elite accent and British Received Pronunciation, with a Southern drawl. Sociologist Patricia Leavy called it "Buckley's High Church, mid-Atlantic accent (taught to actors in the Hollywood studios of the 1930s and 1940s) that was curdled by an ascendant tincture of Southern drawl that softened somewhat the supercilious inflection that very likely was spawned during his education at Yale".

Professor of political science Gerald L. Houseman wrote that Buckley's vaunted love of language did not ensure the quality of his writing, and criticized some of Buckley's work for "inappropriate metaphors and inelegant syntax" and for his habit of interjecting parenthetical references to the "temperament or morals" of people he quoted.

=== Rhetorical style ===
On Firing Line, Buckley had a reputation for being polite to his guests, but also occasionally softly teased his guests if they were friends. Sometimes during heated debates, as with Gore Vidal, Buckley became less polite.

Epstein writes that liberals were especially fascinated by Buckley and often wanted to debate him, in part because his ideas resembled their own: Buckley typically formulated his arguments in reaction to left-liberal opinion rather than founding them on conservative principles alien to liberals.

Appel argues from rhetorical theory that Buckley's essays are often written in "low" burlesque in the manner of Samuel Butler's satirical poem Hudibras. Considered as drama, such discourse features black-and-white disorder, a guilt-mongering logician, distorted clownish opponents, limited scapegoating, and a self-serving redemption.

Lee contends that Buckley introduced a new rhetorical style that conservatives often tried to emulate. The "gladiatorial style", as Lee calls it, is flashy and combative, filled with sound bites, and leads to inflammatory drama.

As conservatives encountered Buckley's arguments about government, liberalism and markets, the theatrical appeal of his style inspired conservative imitators, becoming one of the principal templates for conservative rhetoric.

In Current Affairs, Nathan J. Robinson wrote of Buckley's role as a major conservative intellectual: "Buckley created a template for conservative intellectualism that is still used today: be glib, confident, and a good debater, throw in a dash of wit and some references to the Classics. Do it all with a self-satisfied smile, and the validity or invalidity of your underlying arguments will cease to be a matter of serious discussion."

== Spy novelist ==
In 1975, Buckley recounted being inspired to write a spy novel by Frederick Forsyth's The Day of the Jackal: "If I were to write a book of fiction, I'd like to have a whack at something of that nature."

He went on to explain that he was determined to avoid the moral ambiguity of Graham Greene and John le Carré. Buckley wrote the 1976 spy novel Saving the Queen, featuring Blackford Oakes as a rule-bound CIA agent, based in part on his own CIA experiences.

Over the next 30 years, he wrote ten more novels featuring Oakes. New York Times critic Charlie Rubin wrote that the series "at its best, evokes John O'Hara in its precise sense of place amid simmering class hierarchies". Stained Glass, the second in the series, won a 1980 National Book Award in the one-year category "Mystery (paperback)". (Note: From 1980 to 1983 in National Book Award history there were dual awards for hardcover and paperback books in many categories. Most of the paperback award–winners were reprints, including this one.)

Buckley was particularly concerned about the view that what the CIA and the KGB were doing was morally equivalent. He wrote in his memoirs, "To say that the CIA and the KGB engage in similar practices is the equivalent of saying that the man who pushes an old lady into the path of a hurtling bus is not to be distinguished from the man who pushes an old lady out of the path of a hurtling bus: on the grounds that, after all, in both cases someone is pushing old ladies around."

Buckley began writing on computers in 1982, starting with a Zenith Z-89. He developed a loyalty to the word processor WordStar, installing it on every new PC he got despite its growing obsolescence. Buckley used it to write his last novel, and when asked why he continued using something so outdated, he answered, "They say there's better software, but they also say there's better alphabets."

== Later career ==
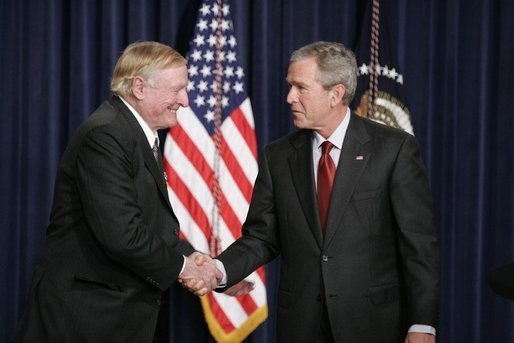
Buckley shaking hands with President George W. Bush on October 6, 2005

Upon turning 65 in 1990, Buckley retired from the day-to-day running of the National Review. The next month, he published the memoir Miles Gone By. Buckley continued to write his syndicated newspaper column and opinion pieces for National Review and National Review Online.

In 1991, Buckley received the Presidential Medal of Freedom.

=== Views on modern-day conservatism ===
Buckley criticized certain aspects of policy within the modern conservative movement. Of George W. Bush's presidency, he said, "If you had a European prime minister who experienced what we've experienced it would be expected that he would retire or resign."

Jeffrey Hart wrote in The American Conservative that Buckley had a "tragic" view of the Iraq war: he "saw it as a disaster and thought that the conservative movement he had created had in effect committed intellectual suicide by failing to maintain critical distance from the Bush administration .... At the end of his life, Buckley believed the movement he made had destroyed itself by supporting the war in Iraq." But of the Iraq War troop surge of 2007, the editors of National Review wrote: "Buckley initially opposed the surge, but after seeing its early success believed it deserved more time to work."

In his December 3, 2007 column, shortly after his wife's death, which he attributed, at least in part, to her smoking, Buckley seemed to advocate banning tobacco use. He wrote articles for Playboy, despite criticizing the magazine and its philosophy. Of neoconservatives, he said in 2004: "I think those I know, which is most of them, are bright, informed and idealistic, but that they simply overrate the reach of U.S. power and influence."

== Personal life ==
In 1950, Buckley married Patricia Buckley, née Taylor, daughter of Canadian industrialist Austin C. Taylor. He met Taylor, a Protestant from Vancouver, British Columbia, while she was a student at Vassar College. She later became a prominent fundraiser for such charitable organizations as the Memorial Sloan Kettering Cancer Center, the Institute of Reconstructive Plastic Surgery at New York University Medical Center, and the Hospital for Special Surgery. She also raised money for Vietnam War veterans. On April 15, 2007, Pat Buckley died at age 80 of an infection after a long illness. After her death, Buckley seemed "dejected and rudderless", according to friend Christopher Little.

William and Patricia Buckley had one son, author Christopher Buckley. They lived at Wallack's Point in Stamford, Connecticut, as well as a duplex apartment at 73 East 73rd Street, a private entrance to 778 Park Avenue in Manhattan, New York City.

Beginning in 1970, for six to seven weeks per year, Buckley and his wife lived and worked in Rougemont, Switzerland.

== Death ==
=== Death ===
Buckley suffered from emphysema and diabetes in his later years. In a December 2007 column, he commented on the cause of his emphysema, citing his lifelong habit of smoking tobacco despite endorsing a legal ban of it. On February 27, 2008, he died of a heart attack at his home in Stamford, Connecticut, at the age of 82.

Initially it was reported that he was found dead at his desk in his study, a converted garage, and his son, Christopher Buckley, said, "He died with his boots on after a lifetime of riding pretty tall in the saddle." But in his 2009 book Losing Mum and Pup: A Memoir, he admitted this account was a slight embellishment on his part; while his father did die in his study, he was found lying on the floor. Buckley was buried at the Saint Bernard Cemetery in Sharon, Connecticut, next to his wife, Patricia.

=== Tributes ===
Notable members of the Republican political establishment paying tribute to Buckley included President George W. Bush, former Speaker of the House of Representatives Newt Gingrich, and former First Lady Nancy Reagan. Bush said of Buckley, "He influenced a lot of people, including me. He captured the imagination of a lot of people." Gingrich added, "Bill Buckley became the indispensable intellectual advocate from whose energy, intelligence, wit, and enthusiasm the best of modern conservatism drew its inspiration and encouragement ... Buckley began what led to Senator Barry Goldwater and his Conscience of a Conservative that led to the seizing of power by the conservatives from the moderate establishment within the Republican Party. From that emerged Ronald Reagan." Reagan's widow, Nancy, said, "Ronnie valued Bill's counsel throughout his political life, and after Ronnie died, Bill and Pat were there for me in so many ways." House Minority Whip Roy Blunt said: "William F. Buckley was more than a journalist or commentator. He was the indisputable leader of the conservative movement that laid the groundwork for the Reagan Revolution. Every Republican owes him a debt of gratitude for his tireless efforts on behalf of our party and nation."

== Legacy ==
=== Reception ===
George H. Nash, a historian of the modern American conservative movement, said in 2008 that Buckley was "arguably the most important public intellectual in the United States in the past half century. For an entire generation, he was the preeminent voice of American conservatism and its first great ecumenical figure." Conversely, political consultant Stuart Stevens, who served as a top strategist on Mitt Romney's 2012 presidential campaign and later as a leading figure with The Lincoln Project, wrote, "for all his well-crafted sentences and love of language, Buckley was often a more articulate version of the same deep ugliness and bigotry that is the hallmark of Trumpism."

In the New York Times, Douglas Martin wrote: "Mr. Buckley's greatest achievement was making conservatism not just electoral Republicanism but conservatism as a system of ideas respectable in liberal post-World War II America. He mobilized the young enthusiasts who helped nominate Barry Goldwater in 1964 and saw his dreams fulfilled when Reagan and the Bushes captured the Oval Office".

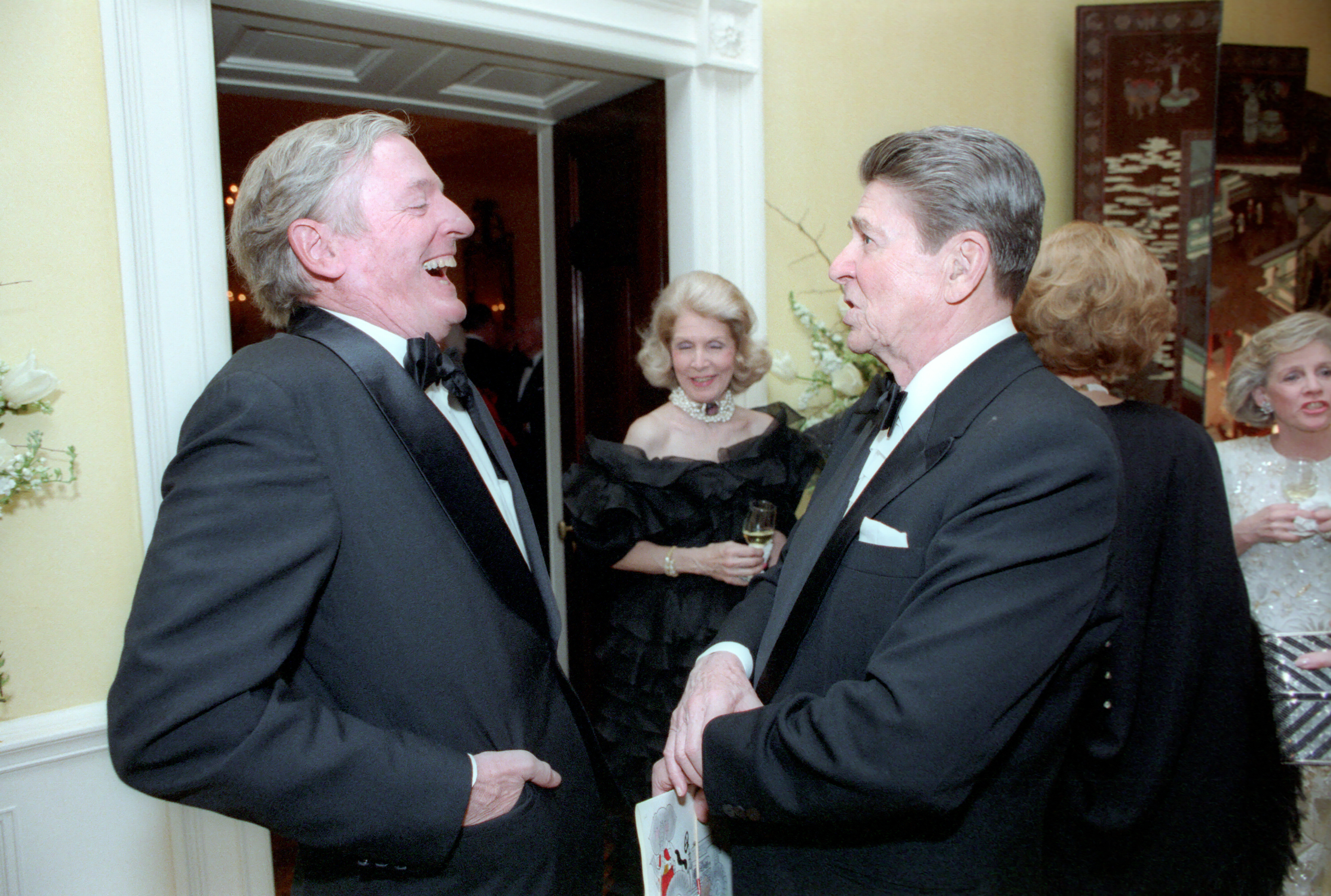
Buckley with President Ronald Reagan at Reagan's birthday celebration, 1986

Conservative columnist George Will emphasized Buckley's importance to both US and global politics, writing, "without Bill Buckley, no National Review. Without National Review, no Goldwater nomination. Without the Goldwater nomination, no conservative takeover of the Republican Party. Without that, no Reagan. Without Reagan, no victory in the Cold War. Therefore, Bill Buckley won the Cold War". James Carden commented, "Will's reasoning suffers, as Buckley himself might have put it, from the post hoc ergo propter hoc fallacy."

=== Biographies ===
Buckley was the subject of Alvin S. Felzenberg's well-received biography A Man and His Presidents: The Political Odyssey of William F. Buckley, Jr. Other biographies include John Judis's William F. Buckley, Jr.: Patron Saint of the Conservatives.

Buckley's authorized biography by Sam Tanenhaus, Buckley: The Life and the Revolution That Changed America, was released in 2025. Tanenhaus began working on it in 1998.

=== Eponymy ===
Various organizations have awards and honors named after Buckley. The Intercollegiate Studies Institute awards the William F. Buckley Award for Outstanding Campus Journalism.

=== In popular culture ===
- In the 1991 film Hook, Dustin Hoffman based his vocal mannerisms as Captain Hook on Buckley.
- In the 1992 film Aladdin, the Genie (voiced by Robin Williams) impersonated Buckley.
- The 2016 film X-Men: Apocalypse briefly shows footage of Buckley on a TV news clip.
- Buckley appears in James Graham's 2021 play Best of Enemies. The play is a fictionalized retelling of the 1968 Buckley–Vidal debates.
- In the 2023 Max miniseries White House Plumbers, Buckley is portrayed by Peter Serafinowicz, as a friend of the family of E. Howard Hunt.
- In 2025, the U.S. Postal Service released a stamp honoring Buckley.

== Archives ==
Manuscripts and Archives at Yale University holds the William F. Buckley, Jr., papers (1951-2008), including papers relating to the publication of God and Man at Yale, files from Buckley's 1965 campaign for mayor of New York City, and his 1950 "Alumni Day Address". Access to the rest of the papers requires the written permission of Christopher T. Buckley during his lifetime, after which access is unrestricted.

== Notes ==
Party political offices
New political party	Conservative Party nominee for Mayor of New York City; 1965	Succeeded by John Marchi
