= Castle Rock Foundation =

The Castle Rock Foundation was an American conservative foundation started in 1993 with an endowment of $36.6M from the Adolph Coors Foundation. It ranked as Colorado's 15th largest foundation by assets at the end of 2001. The foundation gathered media attention during Pete Coors' unsuccessful 2004 Senate run, when opponents pointed at the dichotomy between the Coors Brewing Company's attempt to appeal to a broad audience, in particular with minorities and gay customers, while the Castle Rock Foundation was used by the Coors family to fund several conservative initiatives intent on curtailing the rights of these same customers.

The Castle Rock Foundation merged into the Adolph Coors Foundation on November 30, 2011.

== Mission ==
- "Promote a better understanding of the free enterprise system"
- "Preserve the principles upon which our democracy was founded to help ensure a limited role for government and the protection of individual rights as provided for in the Constitution"
- "Encourage personal responsibility and leadership"
- "Uphold traditional American values"
