= William F. Buckley Sr. =

American lawyer (1881–1958)

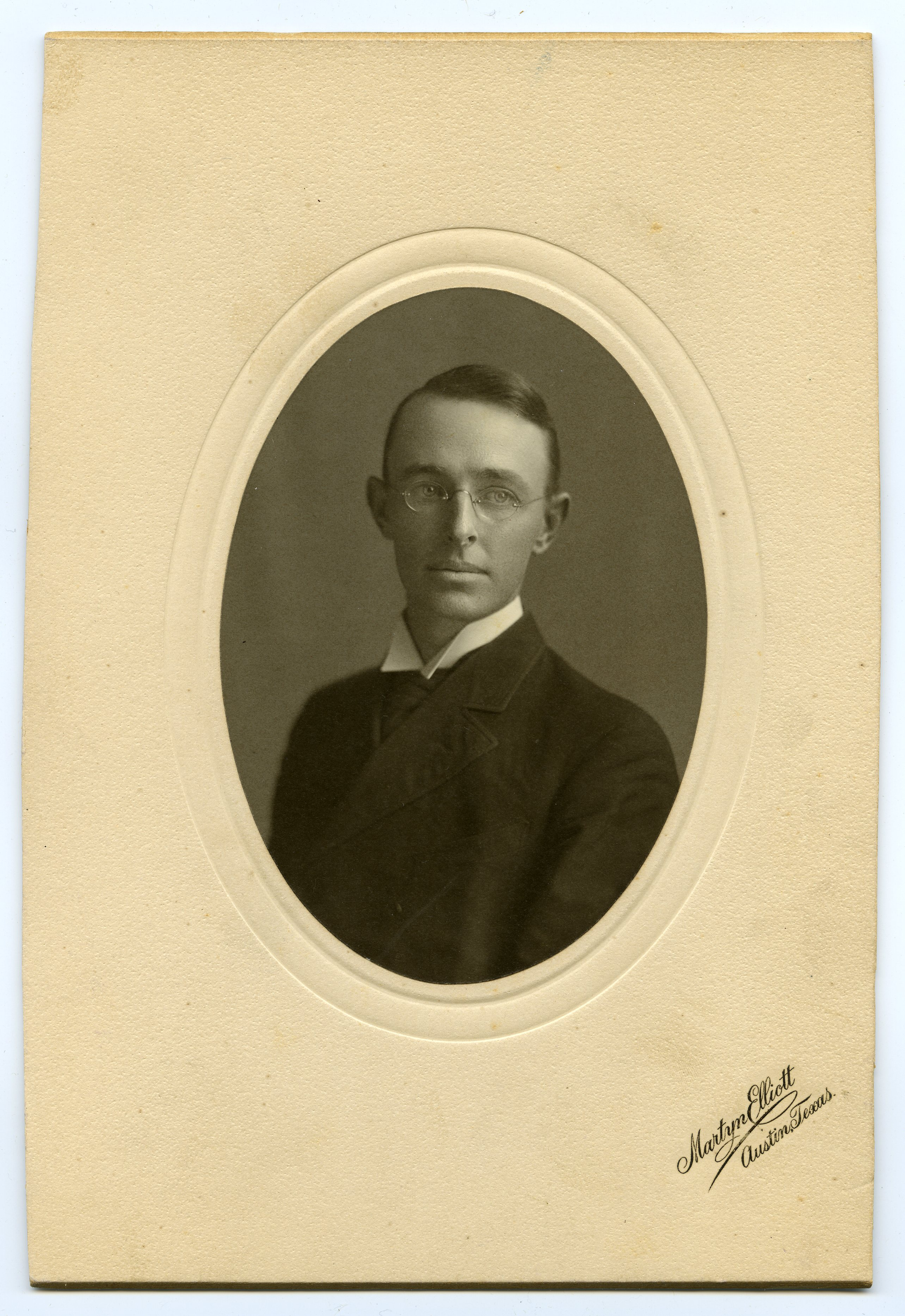
- Born: William Frank Buckley; July 11, 1881; Washington-on-the-Brazos, Texas, U.S.
- Died: October 5, 1958 (aged 77); New York City, U.S.
- Citizenship: United States; Mexican
- Education: University of Texas, Austin (BS, LLB)
- Occupations: Lawyer; real estate developer; oil developer
- Spouse: Aloise Josephine Antonia Steiner (m. 1917)
- Children: 10; including William, James, Priscilla, Patricia, Reid

William Frank Buckley Sr. (July 11, 1881 – October 5, 1958) was an American lawyer and oil developer. He became influential in Mexican politics during the military dictatorship of Victoriano Huerta but was later expelled when Álvaro Obregón became president. He became wealthy due to his interests in oil exploration and speculation. Buckley was the father of ten children, including William F. Buckley Jr., the author and founder of National Review magazine, and James L. Buckley, a U.S. Senator from New York (1971–1977). He was the grandfather of author and humorist Christopher Buckley.

== Early life and education ==
Buckley was born the fourth of eight children in Washington-on-the-Brazos, Texas, the son of Mary Ann Langford and John Claude Buckley. His parents had immigrated to Texas from Hamilton, Ontario, Canada, in 1874. Both of their families had immigrated to Upper Canada from Ireland from Limerick and Cork, respectively. Langford is a name of English or Norman origin, while Buckley is an anglicized version of Ó Buachalla, a surname quite common in Ireland.

In 1882, the family relocated from Washington-on-the-Brazos to San Diego, Duval County, Texas, where John Buckley was a businessman who worked in merchandising, politics, and sheep raising. He was elected several times as Duval County Sheriff. After William Frank finished school, he taught Spanish-speaking pupils in a country school near Benavides. He retained a knowledge of and friendship with Spanish-speaking people his entire life.

Buckley attended the University of Texas at Austin, where he received advanced credit for his Spanish language skills and acted as an assistant to a professor in the Romance languages department. He worked as a Spanish translator along with his sister, Priscilla Buckley, for the Texas General Land Office. He helped to found the University of Texas' Chapter of the fraternity Delta Tau Delta. As a devout Catholic, Buckley was part of an effort to purchase property near the university for the Newman Club.

After the death of his father in 1904, Buckley commissioned building a large house at Lavaca and 19th streets in Austin (now the site of the Cambridge Tower), where his mother lived until her death in 1930. He obtained a Bachelor of Science degree in 1904 from the University of Texas and his Bachelor of Laws from the University of Texas Law School. In 1905 he was elected editor of the University of Texas Yearbook The Cactus. In 1909 Buckley received his license to practice law and was elected a member of the Texas Bar Association.

== Legal career in Mexico ==
In 1908, Buckley moved to Mexico where, together with his brother Claude, he founded the law firm of Buckley & Buckley to represent major American and European oil companies operating in Mexico. In 1912, he opened an office with his other brother Edmund in Tampico, Tamaulipas. In 1913 Buckley founded and became President of the Pantepec Oil Company based in Tampico. In 1914, during tensions with the United States, President Huerta appointed Buckley counsel for a convention organized by Argentina, Brazil, and Chile. The nations, known as the ABC Powers, were working to mediate relations between Mexico and the US because of their implications for Latin America. Buckley turned his legal practice over to his brothers to speculate in real estate and leasing of oil lands.

In 1914, the United States occupied the port of Veracruz following an incident related to Mexicans' importing illegal German arms. Buckley refused an offer by President Woodrow Wilson to be appointed as acting civil governor of the state of Veracruz. In 1919, Buckley testified before the U.S. Senate Joint Subcommittee on Foreign Relations as an expert on conditions in Mexico.

He then founded the American Association of Mexico (AAM), a lobby group working to amend Article 27 of the recently adopted 1917 Constitution to remove restrictions on individual American ownership of land and oil rights. In 1921, the Mexican government expelled Buckley because of his AAM activity. Buckley reported on his expulsion to the Secretary of State of the United States in 1922. He donated his papers to the University of Texas in 1923. In 1924, Mexican President Plutarco Elías Calles invited Buckley to return to Mexico, but instead he transferred his Pantepec Oil Company to Venezuela.

== Oil speculator ==
After he transferred his company to Venezuela, Buckley fully committed himself to oil exploration, where he was one of the first to use the "farm-out" system. That entailed Buckley's making agreements with some of the largest oil companies by which they would share profits on oil found on the land in return for sharing development costs. His first major deal was made with Standard Oil during the 1930s, when a large oilfield was discovered on Pantepec's Venezuelan lands. During his career, Buckley was primarily interested in unexplored territory. In 1946 he began developing his holdings into separate companies. His operations became international with holdings in Canada, Florida, Ecuador, Australia, the Philippines, Israel and Guatemala.

== Personal life ==
In 1917, Buckley married Aloise Josephine Antonia Steiner, of New Orleans; she was of Swiss-German, and some Irish, ancestry. They had ten children: Aloïse, short story writer; John, oil business; Priscilla, a journalist; James, senator and judge; Jane, the non-writer; Bill, National Review founder; Patricia, Triumph magazine collaborator; Reid, public speaking teacher; Maureen, oversaw National Review subscriptions; and Carol, another author. His ten children produced about 50 grandchildren. Buckley supervised his children's educations to ensure they learned Spanish and French as well as excellent English. After living in Mexico and South America, the family lived for years in England, France, and the United States. The children attended private Catholic schools in England and France. During the 1920s, the Buckleys purchased properties called Great Elm in Sharon, Connecticut, and Kamchatka in Camden, South Carolina, for when they lived in the United States.

== Death ==
While traveling between Paris and New York City in September 1958, Buckley suffered a stroke while aboard the S.S. United States, where he was given the Viaticum or Last Rites. He died in Lenox Hill Hospital in New York City on October 5, 1958.
