= Patricia Buckley Bozell =

American writer (1927–2008)

Patricia Lee Buckley Bozell (April 23, 1927 – July 12, 2008) was an American author. She was the wife of L. Brent Bozell Jr., and the sister of conservative commentator William F. Buckley and Senator James L. Buckley. She helped to establish and served as managing editor of Bozell's magazine, Triumph, a Catholic opinion journal. A native of New York City and a graduate of Vassar College, she was a freelance editor at Regnery Publishing, National Review, The American Spectator, and Communio.

She was the mother of 10 children, including Media Research Center founder L. Brent Bozell III. She and her husband were also the godparents to novelist Tristan Egolf.

Bozell is known for attempting to slap Ti-Grace Atkinson at the auditorium of the Catholic University of America after a speech by Atkinson on the virginity of the Virgin Mary, which Bozell described as "an illiterate harangue against the mystical body of Christ."
