= L. Brent Bozell Jr. =

American activist and writer (1926–1997)

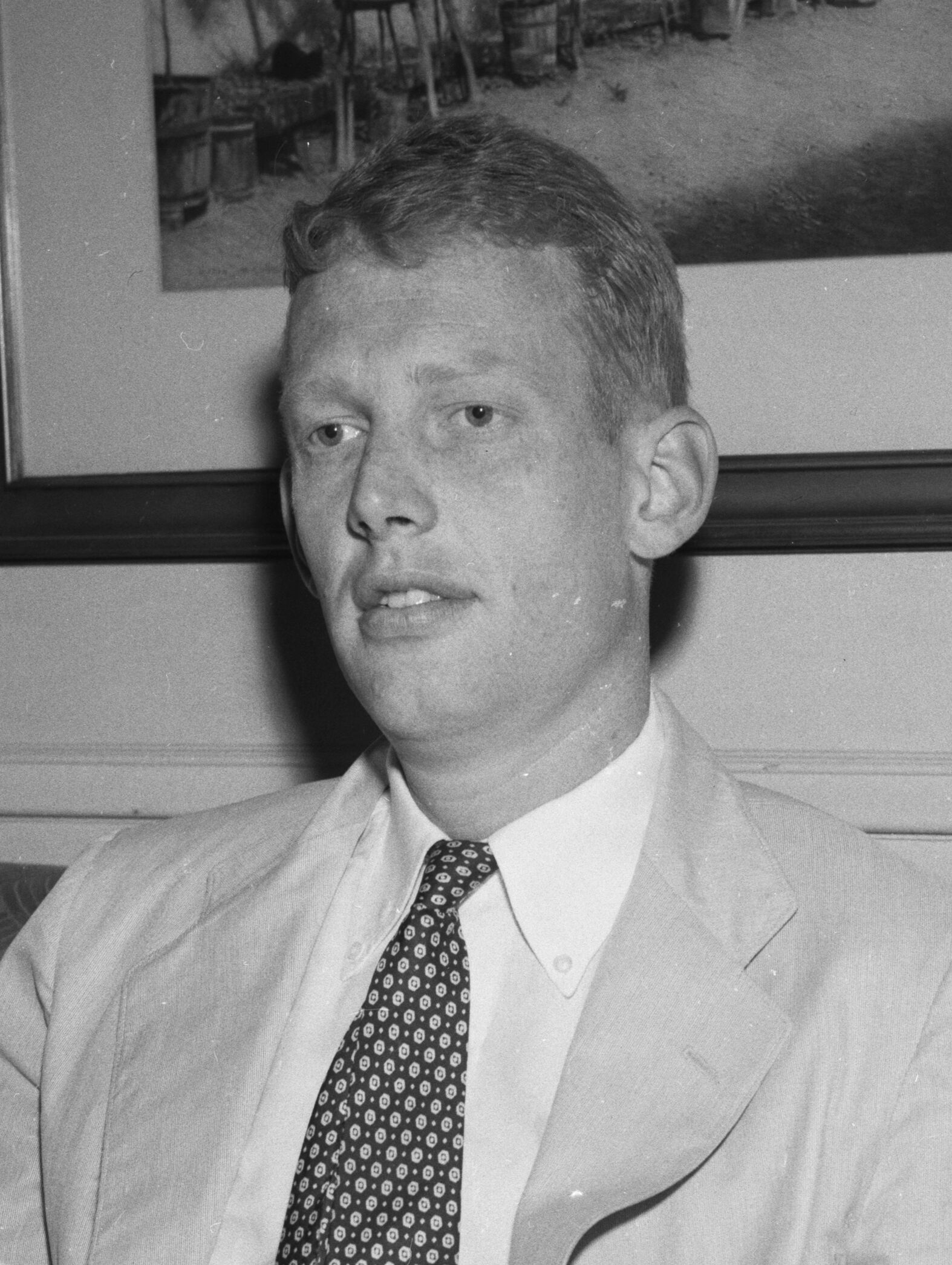
- Bozell in 1954
- Born: Leo Brent Bozell Jr. January 15, 1926; Omaha, Nebraska, U.S.
- Died: April 15, 1997 (aged 71); Bethesda, Maryland, U.S.
- Education: Yale University (BA, LLB)
- Occupations: Author, commentator, activist
- Spouse: Patricia Buckley Bozell
- Children: 10, including Brent
- Writing career
- Subjects: American conservatism, anti-communism, judicial activism, Catholic social teaching

Leo Brent Bozell Jr. (/boʊˈzɛl/; January 15, 1926 – April 15, 1997) was an American activist and former United States Merchant Mariner. He was a strong supporter of the anti-abortion movement, and he co-founded the traditionalist Catholic magazine Triumph in 1966, which was published for a decade until its dissolution in 1976.

== Early life and education ==
Bozell was born in Omaha, Nebraska, to Lois (née Robbins) and Leo B. Bozell, the co-founder of Bozell Worldwide. He attended Creighton Preparatory School in Omaha.

Bozell was the state American Legion Oratorical Contest Champion of Nebraska in 1943 and 1944, winning the national title in 1944. He served in the U.S. Merchant Marine in the Pacific during World War II. Bozell resolved to convert to Catholicism in 1946, but after his father's death that same year, he deferred his decision until 1947 so as not to upset his family.

Bozell attended Yale University, where he became best friends with William F. Buckley Jr., who was his teammate in the Yale debating society. In the book Before the Storm: Barry Goldwater and the Unmaking of the American Consensus, Buckley described Bozell as "a young, energetic red-haired Yalie from Omaha". At Yale, Bozell also was president of the Yale Political Union and president of Yale's World Federalist Movement.

== Career ==
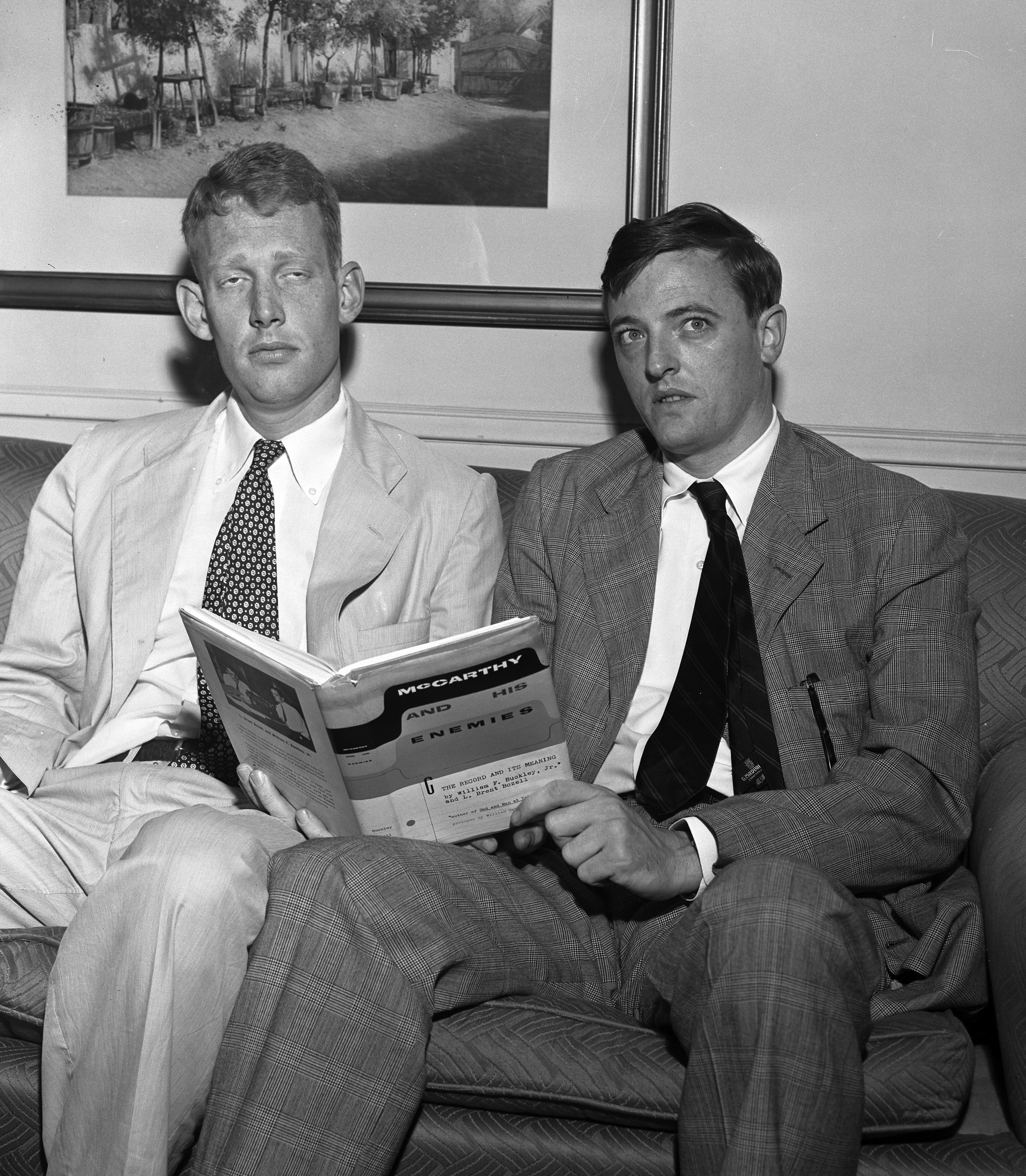
Bozell (left) and William F. Buckley Jr. promote their book McCarthy and His Enemies in 1954

Bozell was a consistent supporter of Senator Joseph McCarthy, teaming up with fellow National Review associate William F. Buckley Jr. in 1954 to write a ringing defense of him in McCarthy and His Enemies. Bozell and Buckley defined McCarthyism, the political movement associated with McCarthy, as “a movement around which men of good will and stern morality can close ranks.” Bozell joined McCarthy's staff, shortly after Roy Cohn left, and wrote McCarthy's defense speech before the U.S. Senate committee that would censure him, as well as a series of policy speeches through at least 1956.

In 1958, Bozell ran for the Maryland House of Delegates but lost. After this defeat he proposed the formation of a new political party at one of the editors' evening meetings in New York; the idea was summarily rejected by the more fusionist editors Buckley and James Burnham. In 1964 he ran in the Republican primary against incumbent liberal Republican Congressman (and later U.S. Senator) Charles Mathias for Maryland's 6th Congressional District. Bozell lost to Mathias 70.2% to 25.9% with the rest of the vote going to a third candidate. He later worked as a speechwriter for Senator Barry Goldwater, for whom he ghostwrote the 1960 book The Conscience of a Conservative. He was a founding member of Young Americans for Freedom.

In 1960, he took his family to Spain for the first time, making him absent from the Palm Beach decision of Buckley, Goldwater, Russell Kirk, and William Baroody Sr. to freeze out the John Birch Society from the conservative movement. Kirk inferred that Bozell would not have had any reason to be opposed to the decision, but, in fact, he, along with Frank Meyer and William Rusher, protested the exclusion of the Society from the conservative movement.

=== Triumph ===
In 1965, he moved his family to Spain purportedly because "you breathed the Catholic thing there" and, along with Frederick Wilhelmsen and William Marshner among others, founded the Catholic magazine Triumph in 1966 which Bozell intended to be a bulwark of Catholic orthodoxy and a sort of National Review for Catholics. The magazine featured contributions from Russell Kirk (a Catholic convert), Christopher Dawson, Erik von Kuehnelt-Leddihn, John Lukacs, Thomas Molnar, Jeffrey Hart, Sir Arnold Lunn, Charles Journet, Rousas John Rushdoony, a Calvinist, and initially received an enthusiastic endorsement by Buckley in the pages of National Review.

However, the relationship between Bozell and his brother-in-law had already begun to sour; in March 1966, when Buckley wrote a column warning that Catholics should not try to seek legislation that would impose on others their belief that abortion is murder, Bozell wrote a letter to the editors of National Review protesting that the column "reeks of relativism...Mr. Buckley writes in this instance as though he had never heard of the natural law." Buckley was stung by the letter and had composed a bitter reply, but decided against sending it. In 1966, Bozell published The Warren Revolution, a scholarly critique of the Supreme Court of the United States under Chief Justice Earl Warren. Despite his relocation to Spain, Bozell remained conscious of U.S. politics; he opposed the Nixon administration, writing in Triumph that, in supporting Nixon's candidacy in 1968, the conservative movement had "ceased to be an important political force in America." Buckley later changed his mind and agreed with Bozell on this subject.

He later repudiated his support for the American experiment itself in his own book The Warren Revolution. Buckley summarized Bozell's new position as, "[Bozell's] thesis now is that the republic of the Founding Fathers was doomed because of their failure to adequately enthrall the city of man to the City of God." Bozell himself felt estranged from the United States in general and in particular the conservative movement in which he was once a rising star, denouncing conservatism as "an inadequate substitute for Christian politics." Especially following the Supreme Court's Roe v. Wade decision, Bozell began to see the United States as a force of evil greater in magnitude to the Soviet Union and denounced both democratic capitalism and communism. Triumph idealized Francoist Spain, criticized the events leading up to the Vietnam War, including the U.S.-backed assassination of South Vietnam's Catholic president, Ngo Dinh Diem, and the conduct of the conflict thereafter as irreconcilable with Just war theory. He opposed chemical warfare and nuclear deterrence, which he had once supported, and identified his economic views with those of distributism.

Friends of Bozell blamed his increasing devotion to Catholicism, his dissolving relationship with Buckley, who was reportedly traumatized by the loss of his closest friend, and his evolving political views on mental deterioration. Neal B. Freeman said, "Brent simply started to fade and you could see it happening, but you couldn't do anything about it." John Judis wrote in William Buckley Jr.: Patron Saint of the Conservatives that, "the breakup of their relationship probably could not have occurred ten years prior or ten years hence. It was very much a product of the tumultuous sixties, which exhilarated Buckley and which lifted him to new heights of celebrity, but in which more troubled, less stable souls like Bozell capsized."

After founding Triumph, Bozell also founded the Society of the Christian Commonwealth whose educational arm, the Christian Commonwealth Institute, headed by Warren Carroll, conducted annual classes, lectures, and seminars at the El Escorial in Spain. The entirety of the original faculty of and many of the donors to Christendom College had attended the program in Spain and were subscribers to Triumph. Carroll later remarked in his obituary for Bozell, "In a very fundamental sense, Christendom College was a Triumph enterprise."

Bozell was a staunch supporter of Pope Paul VI and strongly defended his condemnation of birth control in the encyclical Humanae Vitae but disagreed with the pope's decisions regarding the liturgy. He was a founding member of and served as a special ambassador for Catholics United for the Faith. Since its founding, Triumph teetered on the verge of collapse and Bozell was planning on shutting the magazine down until Patricia Bozell attended a forum at the Catholic University of America featuring radical feminist Ti-Grace Atkinson in March 1971. When Atkinson said the Virgin Mary was more "used" than if she had participated in a sexual conception, Patricia attempted to slap her and her hand hit the microphone and she was escorted out. When Bozell heard what his wife had done, he stood up and bellowed, "To Hell with Catholic University!" The positive reader feedback convinced him to keep the magazine alive. In 1976, after the death of Francisco Franco and the beginning of the Spanish transition to democracy, Triumph ceased publication.

In 1985, Bozell founded Misión Guadalupe, a program devoted to the assistance and evangelization of Hispanic immigrants.

=== Anti-abortion activity ===
In June 1970, three years before the Roe v. Wade decision and when abortion was illegal in most of United States outside California; Washington, D.C.; and New York; Bozell Jr. and Patricia Bozell led the first "Operation Rescue" mission to try by direct action to negotiate with administrators at George Washington University Hospital clinic in Washington, D.C., where abortion was permitted for the mental well-being of the mother.

Bozell asked clinic administrators to stop the abortions and, if they would not do so, to appoint a Catholic nurse to administer baptism and prepare the remains for Catholic burial after each abortion. Bozell and about 230 others met at a local church for a "Funeral Mass for the Holy Innocents" celebrated by four priests. The rally afterwards included a pro-life student group from the University of Dallas, Los Hijos de la Tormenta ("The Sons of Thunder"), who were dressed in khaki and red berets (red berets being worn by the Carlist Basques, whom Bozell admired), wore rosaries, and carried papal flags. One speaker declared: "America ... you are daggering to death your unborn of tomorrow. The very cleanliness of your sterilized murder gives off the stench of death."

After the rally, Bozell, donning a red beret himself, approached the clinic with seven others. They were spotted by a security guard who locked the door to prevent their entry. One of the "Sons of Thunder" raced to one of the buildings, unlocked side-doors, and was able to jam it open with a crucifix. By means of the jammed door, Bozell and the rest of the group entered the building and began shattering windows while shouting "Viva Cristo Rey!" (a Catholic battle cry used during the Cristero War). The Washington DC police were called and had to use billy clubs to subdue Bozell's group and arrest them. Appearing in court in October, 1970 Bozell declared "America is going to have to reckon with its Christians, like it or not." Bozell and the other members of his group received suspended sentences. Bozell later said, "If disorder is necessary to stop this murdering of babies, I'm in favor of disorder."

Buckley denounced Bozell's actions, declaring in the National Review that "the Sons of Thunder have moved precious few of the unconvinced over to their side." Though Triumph closed two years later, its staff and Bozell remained active, including the organization of the first March for Life.

The cover of Triumph's March 1973 issue after the Roe v. Wade decision was solid black except for a small logo, a white cross, and the words "For the children".

== Personal life ==
Bozell married Patricia Lee Buckley, sister of William F. Buckley, and they had ten children, including L. Brent Bozell III, a conservative activist and founder and president of Media Research Center, a conservative media watchdog group and publisher. Another son, Michael Bozell, is a Benedictine monk in Solesmes Abbey. The Bozell family grew to 23 grandchildren and a great-grandchild by the time he died. His godson was novelist Tristan Egolf.

== Illnesses and final years ==
Bozell suffered from bipolar disorder, and wrote publicly about his experiences with the disease, the suffering it created, and his recovery in the introduction to Mustard Seeds, a collection mostly of his post-National Review writings, including many from Triumph, published in 1986. The book included "Poland's Cross—And America's," Bozell's first National Review essay in almost two decades. It also included the National Review essay, for which he may be remembered best, "Freedom or Virtue," which touched off a robust debate between himself and Meyer, mostly around whether freedom or virtue should be the paramount consideration for American conservatives.

Bozell faithfully visited inmates at Lorton Correctional Complex in Northern Virginia every week for years until his death.

== Death ==
Bozell died of pneumonia in a nursing home in Bethesda, Maryland, on April 15, 1997, at the age of 71 after years of numerous and crippling health problems. His son, L. Brent Bozell III, spoke of those struggles when eulogizing him:

Dozens of times over...25 years the attacks would come, and with each bout, yet another blow, yet another public humiliation. There were arrests and forced hospitalizations, escapes and re-arrests and recommitments. There was the never-ending parade of lawyers, police, doctors, and, yes, from time to time the State Department was on the line to brief us on yet another prospective international upheaval caused by this very unpredictable man. Manic depression by itself is enough to break the spirit of any man, but Pop was no ordinary man. He suffered from peripheral neuropathy, sleep apnea, osteoporosis, degenerative disc disease, asthma, and Alzheimer's. One by one they came, and when it seemed that no part of his body had been left untouched yet a new illness was diagnosed. We wondered how he could endure so much, accept this torture with such nobility, with never one word of complaint.

== Works ==
- The Best of Triumph., contributor, Lawrence, E. Michael, ed. Front Royal, VA: Christendom Press ISBN 0-931888-72-7.
- McCarthy and His Enemies, (co-author with William F. Buckley Jr.) Chicago: Regnery, 1954. Reissued as ISBN 0-89526-472-2.
- The Warren Revolution, (New York: Arlington House, 1966.)
- Mustard Seeds: A Conservative Becomes a Catholic, Front Royal, VA: Christendom Press ISBN 0-931888-73-5.

== Sources ==
- Bridges, Linda; Coyne, John R. Jr., Strictly Right: William F. Buckley Jr. and the American Conservative Movement
- Buckley, William F. Jr.
- Buckley, William F. Jr. (May 19, 1997). "L. Brent Bozell, RIP". National Review. 49 (9).
- Critchlow, Donald T., The Conservative Ascendancy: How the GOP Right Made Political History
- Critchlow, Donald T., Intended Consequences: Birth Control, Abortion, and the Federal Government in Modern America
- Hudson, Deal, Onward, Christian Soldiers
- Perlstein, Rick, Before the Storm: Barry Goldwater and the Unmaking of the American Consensus
- Stout, David (April 19, 1997). "L. Brent Bozell, 71, a Champion of Conservatism". The New York Times.
