= William Marshner =

American theologian and professor (born 1943)

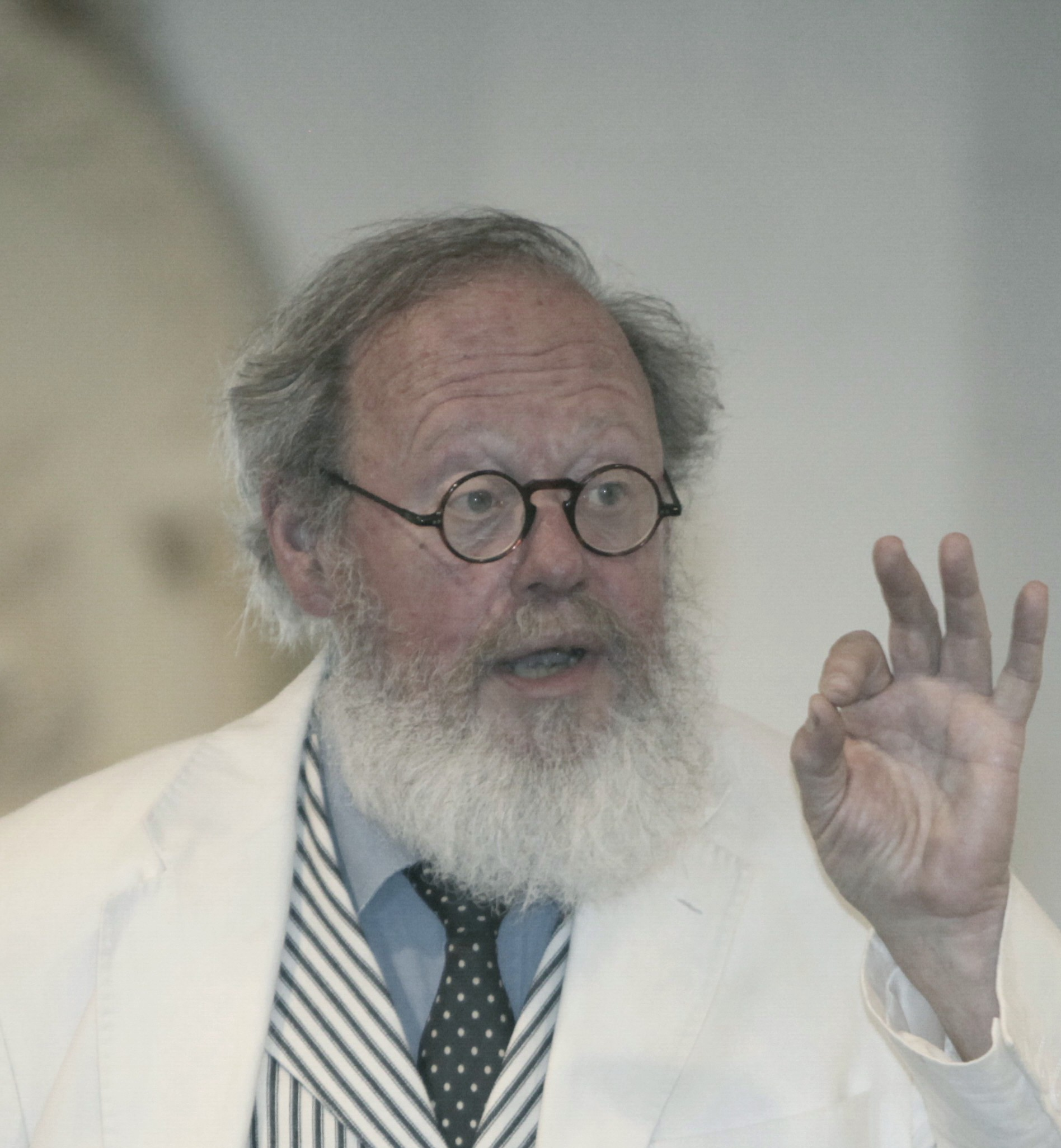
- Marshner in 2015
- Born: William Harry Marshner; August 14, 1943 (age 83); Baltimore, Maryland, U.S.
- Spouse: Connaught Marshner (m. 1973)

Academic background
- Education: Gettysburg College; Yale University; University of Dallas; Pontifical Lateran University

Academic work
- Discipline: Theology
- School or tradition: Thomism
- Institutions: Christendom College
- Website: marshner.christendom.edu

William Harry Marshner (born August 14, 1943) is an American retired emeritus Professor of Theology at Christendom College in Front Royal, Virginia. He is a former chairman of the Theology Department and a founding professor, who created that institution's theology and philosophy curricula. He has written extensively on ethics and Thomism, and is most widely read as the co-author of Cultural Conservatism: A New National Agenda.

== Early life and education ==
Marshner was born in Baltimore on August 14, 1943. He attended Gettysburg College and went on to graduate study in Ancient Near Eastern Languages at Yale University with the intention of acquiring the ability to read the Scriptures in their original languages in preparation for a career in the Lutheran ministry.

At Yale, Marshner became a prominent leader of campus conservatism, opposing the anti-Vietnam War movement and student radicalism of the late 1960s. He subsequently met L. Brent Bozell Jr., and Frederick D. Wilhelmsen at meetings of the Philadelphia Society. At Yale Graduate School, he was given a bursary job as night watchman in Sterling Memorial Library, where he read Thomas Aquinas. The combined influences of Bozell, Wilhelmsen, and Aquinas provoked a religious crisis, causing Marshner to question Lutheranism and to convert to the Catholic Church. He obtained an indult to change from the Roman to the Melkite Greek Catholic Church in 1975.

== Career ==
Marshner left Yale, fed up with what he saw as the radical left-dominated campus atmosphere in 1971 to become editor of Triumph. He was contributing editor to The Wanderer from 1972 to 1975. He subsequently earned his M.A. in philosophy from the University of Dallas and S.T.L. and S.T.D. degrees from Pontifical Lateran University.

With William S. Lind, Marshner wrote the 1987 book Cultural Conservatism: A New National Agenda, which Lew Daly has described as "a new principled framework for policies that would strengthen traditional religious culture". Writing for The Wall Street Journal, Ed Crane noted that the book was significant for its "open break with the Libertarian, individualistic, rights-oriented brand of conservatism" but called it "a deeply, dangerously flawed book". The National Review observed that the book had caused "a considerable stir in conservative circles and in the press" and called the book "intellectually and politically challenging". In her 2002 book Killing for Life: The Apocalyptic Narrative of Pro-life Politics, scholar Carol Mason credited Marshner as one of the "architects of cultural conservatism", which was a distinctive form of conservatism emphasizing morality and "privileging culture over economics".

From 1977 until his retirement in 2014, Marshner taught theology at Christendom College.

After his retirement, in 2024, Marshner wrote and published the very first translation of Cardinal Cajetan's commentary on the Summa Theologiae Prima Pars, called the Editio Leonina.

== Personal life ==
Marshner married Connaught Coyne, with whom he has four children, on October 19, 1973.

== Awards ==
Woodrow Wilson Fellow, 1964–65 Yale University Fellow, 1965–69 Richard Weaver Fellow, 1975–76 The Cardinal Wright Award, 1979 Knighthood, Order of the Holy Sepulchre, 1997

== Books ==
- Mary: Redemption and Preservation, Christendom Press, 1981.
- Co-author with several others, Reasons for Hope, Christendom Press, 1982, ISBN 978-0931888076
- Coauthor with several others, The Morality of Political Action: Biblical Foundations, Free Congress Research and Education Foundation, 1984
- Co-author with William S. Lind, Cultural Conservatism: A New National Agenda, Free Congress Research and Education Foundation, 1987, ISBN 9780942522129
- The New Creatures and the New Politics, Committee for the Survival of a Free Congress, Inc., 1987
- Co-author with William S. Lind, Cultural Conservatism Theory and Practice, Free Congress Research and Education Foundation, 1991, ISBN 978-0942522167
- Natural Desire and Natural End: A Critical Comparison of Cajetan, Soto, and Bañez, UMI, 2001, Istituto Giovanni Paolo II per studi su matrimonio e famiglia, 2013
- Editor, Defending the Faith: An Anti-Modernist Anthology, The Catholic University of America Press, 2016, ISBN 9780813228969
- Translator, Josef Kleutgen, S.J., Die Philosophie der Vorzeit (1860–1863), as "Pre-Modern Philosophy Defended", St Augustine's Press, 2019, ISBN 978-1587316555
- Translator, Saint Thomas Aquinas and Cardinal Cajetan O.P., Leonine Summa Theologiae (1888–1930), as "Summa Theologiae, Prima Pars, with the Commentary of Cardinal Cajetan", Catholic University of America Press, 2024, ISBN 978-0813236476

== Articles ==
- "Membership in the Church: Fundamental Questions", Faith and Reason, Vol. 2 (1976) : 54–71
- Criteria for Doctrinal Development in the Marian Dogmas: An Essay in Meta-theology", Marian Studies , Vol. 28 (1977) : 47–100
- "Towards a Relational Theory of Our Lady's Co-Redeemership", (with J. M. Alonso), Ephemerides Mariologicae, Vol. 27 : 413–423
- "A Logician's Reflections on the Debitum Contrahendi Peccatum", Marian Studies , Vol. 29 (1978) : 134–187
- "Early Christological Faith: An Ignatian Formula", Faith and Reason, Vol. 5 (1979): 3–11
- "Critique of Marian Counterfactual Formulae: A Report of Results", Marian Studies, Vol.30 (1979): 108–139
- "The Immaculate Conception and Recent Ecclesiology: i. Prolegomena", Marian Studies , Vol. 33 (1982) : 124–146
- "The Immaculate Conception and Recent Ecclesiology: ii. Christo-conformity, Maternity, and Brideship in Mary as type of the Church", Marian Studies, Vol. 34 (1983) : 127–158
- "Dignitatis humanae and Traditional Teaching on Church and State", Faith and Reason, Vol. 9 (1983): 222–248
- "The Immaculate Conception and Recent Ecclesiology: iii. Mary, the Church, and Sinlessness", Marian Studies , Vol. 35 (1984)
- "The Structure of Platonism and the Dogma of the Trinity", Faith and Reason, Vol. 13 (1987) : 2–58
- "A Tale of Two Beatitudes", Faith and Reason, Vol. 17 (1991): 218–233
- "Aquinas on the Evaluation of Human Actions", The Thomist, Vol. 59 (1995): 355–378
- "Can a Couple Practicing NFP Be Practicing Contraception?", Gregorianum, Vol. 77 (1996): 677–704
- "Implausible Diagnosis: A Response to Germain Grisez", The American Journal of Jurisprudence, Vol. 46 (2001): 91–112
- "Does Practical Reason Start with `Good' or with `Complete Good'?" Faith and Reason, Vol. 26 (2001): 339–378
- "On the Collaboration between Bishops and Theologians", papers Presented at the Conference of the Cardinal Newman Society, November, 2001, published in Peter M.J. Stravinskas and Patrick J. Reilly (eds.), Newman's Idea of a University: The American Response, Newman House Press, 2006, ISBN 978-0970402233
