= Triumph (magazine) =

American monthly magazine (1966–1975)

- Categories: Religion
- Frequency: Monthly
- Founder: L. Brent Bozell Jr.
- Final issue Number: January 1976; Volume 11, Number 1
- Country: United States
- Based in: Washington, D.C., U.S.
- Language: English
- ISSN: 0041-3127

Triumph was a monthly American magazine published by L. Brent Bozell, Jr. from 1966 to 1976. It published commentary on religious, philosophical, and cultural issues from the traditionalist Catholic perspective.

== Origin ==
Bozell founded Triumph in 1966 as a magazine for American Catholic conservatives following the Second Vatican Council. Bozell, previously an editor for National Review founded by his brother-in-law William F. Buckley, Jr., was put off by the insufficient respect the largely Catholic editorial board of the magazine paid to Catholic social teaching. Specifically, he protested the prevailing attitude of "Mater si, magistra no" towards Pope John XXIII's papal encyclicals Mater et Magistra and Pacem in terris. For example, Bozell considered Buckley too soft in his opposition to abortion.

Dismayed by the direction in which American intellectual conservatism was going, Bozell resigned from National Review in 1963 and assembled the first issue of Triumph in September 1966. With Bozell on the editorial board were Michael Lawrence, Frederick Wilhelmsen, and, for a time, Jeffrey Hart and John Wisner. At first, National Review praised Triumph as a fine manifestation of the "church militant" at a time when much American religion had been debased by the worship of false idols. Later, the strident activism of Triumph's editors led to an estrangement between the two journals.

== History ==
The editors of the new magazine were caught in the awkward position of attempting to preserve traditional Catholicism just when the Church was transforming itself. Triumph sought to emphasize Catholicism as the one true faith as Dignitatis humanae ushered in a new emphasis on religious pluralism and brought an end to the "error has no rights" era. Bozell argued that the refusal to seek the conversion of American Jews was a form of contempt rather than respect, a new variety of anti-Semitism: "By abandoning their most valuable possession... Christians would deny to Jews the fulfillment of the promises made to Israel and awaited anxiously throughout the centuries." The magazine also strongly opposed the liturgical reforms and carried elegies for the Tridentine Mass. It argued that the abandonment of Latin, the lingua franca of Christendom, was a symbolic abandonment of the unity of the Christian West.

The founders of Triumph hoped that the Church could maintain its internal integrity and serve as the foundation for Christian politics. Preferring Franco's Spain to Richard Nixon's America, they admired Francisco Franco's preservation of the Catholic Church and his zealous anti-Communism. Bozell and his family lived in Spain in the 1960s. Between 1960 and 1967, Frederick Wilhelmsen worked as a professor of philosophy at the University of Navarre. Wilhelmsen argued that of all the Western nations, Spain held a unique place because "there is only one nation in history that has bested at arms both Islam and Marxism and that one nation is Spain."

In contrast to most other American conservatives, Triumph inveighed against capitalism in the tradition of Pope Leo XIII's watershed encyclical Rerum novarum and Pope Pius XI's Quadragesimo anno and identified its economic views most closely with the distributism of G. K. Chesterton. The magazine also had no sympathy for the alternative of socialism, against which there was a century of papal opposition. Despite being ardently anti-Communist, Triumph opposed the Vietnam War on the grounds that the conflict violated the Just War theory. The editors were already soured by US complicity in the assassination of the Catholic President of South Vietnam Ngô Đình Diệm but were further dismayed by rumors of American use of chemical weapons. Triumph then declared itself totally against nuclear deterrence (which Bozell had been a staunch advocate of early in his career) as incompatible with the Catholic faith.

== Decline ==
The editors of Triumph were staunch supporters of Pope Paul VI's encyclical Humanae Vitae, which affirmed the traditional Catholic teaching against artificial contraceptives in contrast to the sexual revolution of the 1960s. The possibility of abortion law reform was even more dismaying to Triumph than the contraception controversy. That was the issue that finally drove the magazine to begin its stark denunciation of America as an enemy of the Catholic faith. In 1970, Brent Bozell led a controversial protest at the George Washington University Hospital in one of the nation's first anti-abortion protests.

The editors said that as long as America had been guided by some measure of Christian principles, it had been possible to live here peacefully while working to construct a Christian social order. However, once the killing of the unborn was permitted by law, a Catholic's dissent had to be absolute. According to Triumph, "If she is to protect herself and she is to abide by her divine mandate to teach all peoples, the Catholic Church in America must break the articles of peace, she must forthrightly acknowledge that a state of war exists between herself and the American political order." Following the Roe v. Wade decision, Triumph published its next issue with an all-black cover and every page edged in black, in funereal acknowledgement of the unborn who would be killed as a result of this decision.

Hart observed that his own sympathy with the initial objectives of the journal was lost when it began to treat the United States as a force of evil comparable in magnitude to the Soviet Union. The journal shrank from its 24-page glossy format into a newsletter in 1975 and ceased publication completely with the farewell edition of January 1976, in which the editors reprinted many of the most notable articles from the journal's earlier days.

== Christendom College ==
After founding Triumph, Bozell also founded the Society for the Christian Commonwealth whose educational arm, the Christian Commonwealth Institute headed by Dr. Warren Carroll, conducted annual classes, lectures, and seminars at the El Escorial in Spain. The entirety of the original faculty of and many of the donors to Christendom College had attended the program in Spain and were subscribers to Triumph, so much so that Carroll remarked in his obituary for Bozell that "In a very fundamental sense, Christendom College was a Triumph enterprise."

== Contributors ==
- Lorenzo Albacete
- Robert Beum
- L. Brent Bozell, Jr., founder and editor-in-chief
- Patricia Buckley Bozell
- Mel Bradford
- Fergus Reid Buckley
- Francis Canavan
- Warren Carroll
- Farley Clinton
- John Crosby
- Christopher Dawson
- Donald De Marco
- Christopher Derrick
- Paul A. Fisher, editor
- Germain Grisez
- Jeffrey Hart, editor
- Robert Herrera
- Solange Hertz
- Frank L. Hicks, Jr.
- Dietrich von Hildebrand
- Charles Journet
- Hugh Kenner
- Russell Kirk
- Michael Lawrence, editor
- Erik von Kuehnelt-Leddihn
- Marcel Lefebvre
- John Lukacs
- Sir Arnold Lunn
- William Marshner, asst. editor 1972-3
- Robert Miller
- Thomas Molnar
- Mark Pilon
- Gary Potter
- Rousas John Rushdoony
- Michael Schwartz
- Antony C. Sutton
- Frederick Wilhelmsen, editor
- John Wisner, editor
