= Modern Age (periodical) =

American academic journal

- Editor: Daniel McCarthy
- Categories: Traditionalist conservatism, regionalism
- Frequency: Quarterly
- Founded: 1957; 69 years ago
- Company: Intercollegiate Studies Institute
- Country: United States
- Language: English
- Website: modernagejournal.com
- ISSN: 0026-7457

Modern Age is an American conservative academic quarterly journal. It was founded in 1957 by Russell Kirk in collaboration with Henry Regnery. Between 1957 and 1976, the journal was published independently in Chicago. In 1976, it was acquired by the Intercollegiate Studies Institute, its current publisher.

== History ==
=== 20th century ===
In founding Modern Age in 1957, Russell Kirk hoped for "a dignified forum for reflective, traditionalist conservatism" and the magazine has remained one of the voices of intellectual, small-"c" conservatism to the present day.

Reflecting the ideals of its founder, in its politics it is traditionalist, localist, against most military interventions, not libertarian, anti-Straussian, and generally critical of neoconservatism. In its religious sympathies it adheres to orthodoxy, whether Roman Catholic, Jewish, Eastern Orthodox, or Protestant.

Modern Age has been described by historian George H. Nash as "the principal quarterly of the intellectual right." Paul Gottfried, a professor at Elizabethtown College, has said that "Modern Age represents humanistic learning, reverence for the eternal, and the sense of human finiteness, values that (alas) have less and less to do with the academic presentation of the liberal arts."

Kirk edited the publication from 1957 to 1959. Eugene Davidson edited it from 1960 to 1969. David S. Collier was its third editor from 1970 to 1983. Its fourth editor, from 1984 to 2007, was George A. Panichas.

=== 21st century ===
Panichas was succeeded as editor by R. V. Young. Peter Lawler replaced Young in 2017. Lawler died later in 2017 and he was replaced by the current editor, Daniel McCarthy.

== Editors ==
The journal's executive editor is Mark Henrie. Its managing editor is Arthur Bloom, and its poetry editor is James Matthew Wilson. Associate editors include George W. Carey, Jude P. Dougherty, Jeffrey Hart, Marion Montgomery, Mordecai Roshwald, and Stephen J. Tonsor.

== Contributors ==
Contributors to Modern Age have included:

- Paul Gottfried
- Jeffrey Hart
- Paul Hollander
- Irving Louis Horowitz
- Russell Kirk
- Włodzimierz Julian Korab-Karpowicz
- E. Christian Kopff
- Peter Lawler
- Thomas Molnar
- Revilo P. Oliver
- Mordecai Roshwald
- Claes G. Ryn
- Ellis Sandoz
- R. J. Stove
- Carol Iannone
- R. V. Young

== See also ==
- Paleoconservatism
