= Rich Lowry =

American writer and editor of National Review

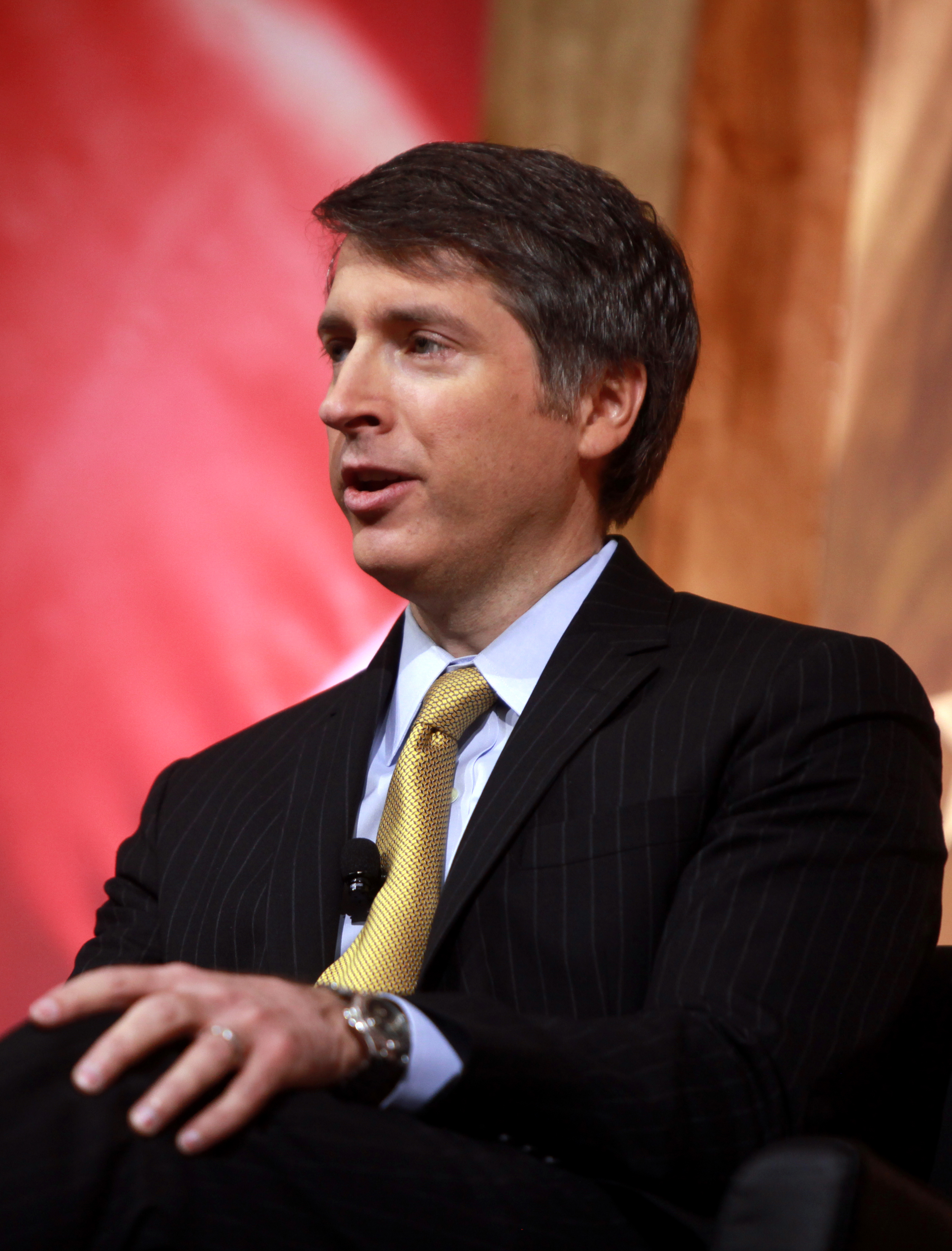
- Lowry in 2014
- Born: August 22, 1968 (age 58); Arlington County, Virginia, U.S.
- Education: University of Virginia (BA)
- Occupations: Editor-in-chief, syndicated columnist
- Known for: National Review
- Spouse: Vanessa Palo (m. 2011)
- Children: 1

Richard A. Lowry (/ˈlaʊri/; born August 22, 1968) is an American writer, and the former editor and now editor-in-chief of National Review, an American conservative news and opinion magazine. Lowry became editor of National Review in 1997 when its founder, William F. Buckley Jr., selected him to lead the magazine. Lowry is also a syndicated columnist, author, and political analyst who is a frequent guest on NBC News and Meet the Press. He has written four books.

== Early life and education ==
Lowry was born and raised in Arlington, Virginia, the son of a social worker mother and an English professor father. After graduating from Yorktown High School in Arlington, Lowry attended the University of Virginia, where he studied English and history. He was editor of the Virginia Advocate, the school's conservative monthly magazine.

== Career ==
After graduating, Lowry worked for Charles Krauthammer as a research assistant, and, later, as a reporter for a local newspaper in northern Virginia.

In 1992, Lowry joined National Review, after finishing second in the magazine's young writers' contest. In the summer of 1994, he became the articles editor for National Review and moved to Washington, D.C. to cover Congress. In November 1997, Lowry became editor of National Review at the age of 29, taking over from John O'Sullivan, who had succeeded Buckley in that position ten years earlier. At the time, Buckley said of Lowry, "I am very confident that I've got a very good person."

During the COVID-19 pandemic, Lowry praised Florida governor Ron DeSantis for his hands-off approach to COVID-19 in a May 2020 column titled "Where does Ron DeSantis go to get his apology?".

Lowry writes a syndicated column for King Features and an opinion column for Politico.

As a political commentator, he regularly appears on various cable shows and network Sunday shows, including NBC's Meet the Press, ABC's This Week, and FOX News Sunday.

In a September 2024 interview with Megyn Kelly, while discussing the Springfield, Ohio, cat-eating hoax, social media users accused Lowry of calling Haitian immigrants in Springfield "niggers". Lowry denied that he used the slur, saying he instead mistakenly combined the words "migrants" and "immigrants".

External videos
- Booknotes interview with Lowry on Legacy, November 9, 2003, C-SPAN
- Presentation by Lowry on Lincoln Unbound, June 18, 2013, C-SPAN
- Presentation by Lowry on Lincoln Unbound, March 22, 2014, C-SPAN
- Presentation by Lowry on The Case for Nationalism, November 18, 2019, C-SPAN
- Washington Journal interview with Lowry on The Case for Nationalism, December 29, 2019, C-SPAN

=== Books ===
Lowry has written three non-fiction books. His New York Times best-selling book, Legacy: Paying the Price for the Clinton Years is a polemic against former President Bill Clinton, whom he characterizes as "Navel-Gazer-in-Chief". In June 2013, he published the Abraham Lincoln political biography Lincoln Unbound.

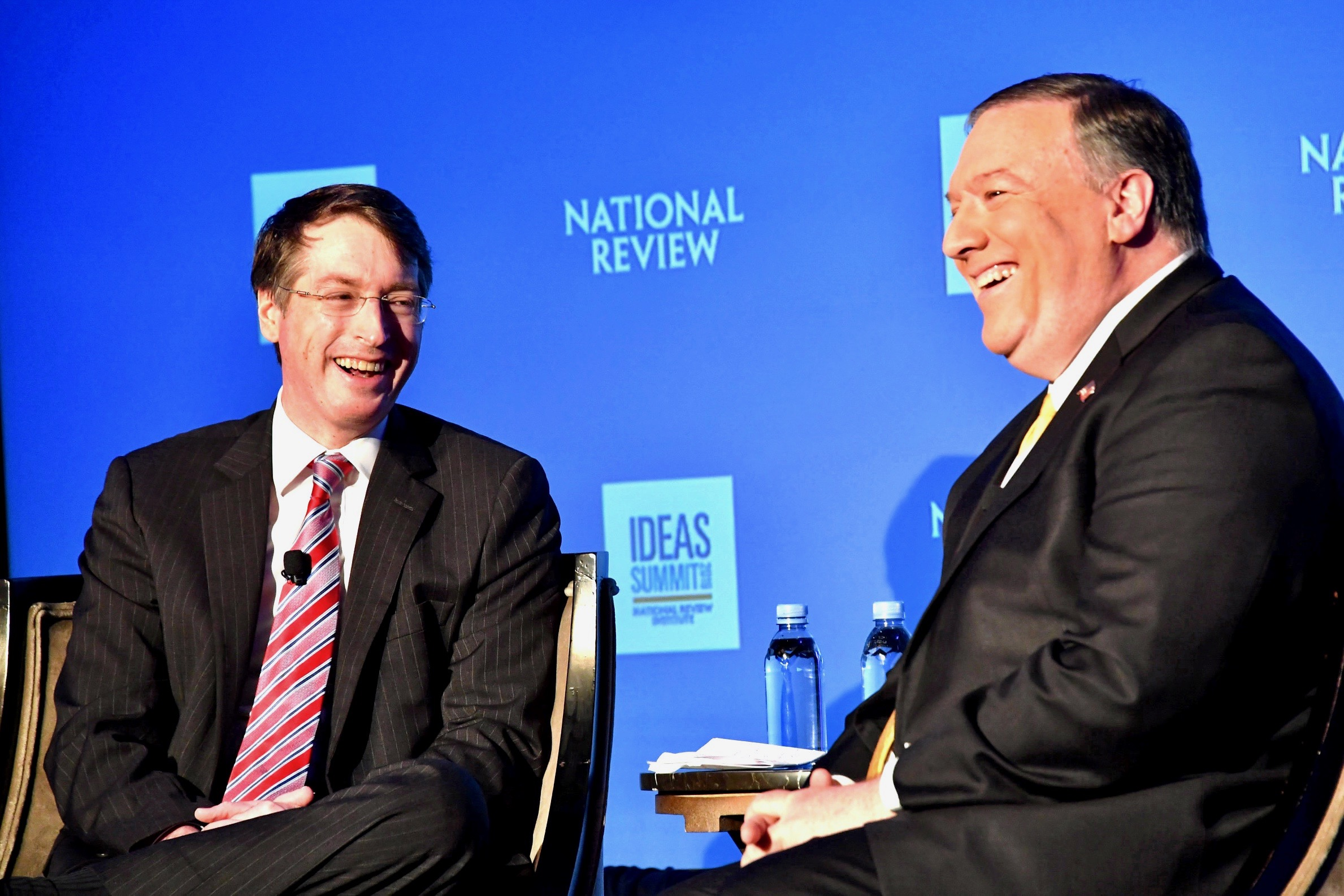
Lowry with then United States Secretary of State Mike Pompeo at a 2019 National Review Institute summit

In November 2019, he published The Case for Nationalism: How It Made Us Powerful, United, and Free. In a review in Foreign Affairs, Georgetown University Professor of Government Charles King criticized the book, arguing that Lowry's definition of a nation is vague, ahistorical and contradictory – "few of Lowry's statements would pass muster with historians" – and that Lowry's assertions about the unity, homogeneity and fixity of units such as Ancient Egypt, Korea, Japan and China "should be an embarrassment" to "any serious thinker." Pulitzer Prize winner Carlos Lozada was harshly critical of the book in a review for The Washington Post, describing it as an attempt to sanitize President Donald Trump's variant of nationalism and "part of a larger effort on the right to create an after-the-fact framework for Trumpism, to contort the president's utterances and impulses into a coherent worldview that can outlast him – a sort of rescue mission for the conservative movement."

Lowry's first novel, the political thriller Banquo's Ghosts, was co-written with Keith Korman and published in 2009.

== Personal life ==
In June 2011, Lowry married Vanessa Palo at the Church of St. Vincent Ferrer in Manhattan. The couple have one daughter.

== Works ==
- Lowry, Rich (2003). Legacy: Paying the Price for the Clinton Years. Washington DC: Regnery Publishing. ISBN 978-0895261298.
- Lowry, Rich; Korman, Keith (2009). Banquo's Ghosts. New York: Vanguard Press. ISBN 978-1593155681.
- Lowry, Rich (2013). Lincoln Unbound. New York: Broadside Books. ISBN 978-0062123787.
- Lowry, Rich (2019). The Case for Nationalism: How It Made Us Powerful, United, and Free. New York: Broadside Books. ISBN 978-0062839640.

== See also ==
- New Yorkers in journalism
