= R. V. Young =

Robert V. Young Jr. (born 1947) is a professor of Renaissance Literature and Literary Criticism in the English Department of North Carolina State University, co-founder and co-editor (with M. Thomas Hester) of the John Donne Journal, and author of multiple books and articles primarily related to the study of literature. He became the editor of the conservative quarterly Modern Age in 2007.

He has served as director of graduate studies in the English Department at NCSU, as well as continuing to teach multiple courses in the department, especially regarding Renaissance and medieval literature. His articles on English literature and education have appeared in multiple journals and periodicals, including the John Donne Journal, Ben Jonson Journal, First Things, The Weekly Standard, National Review, and Culture Wars. He is also a member of and has served as president (1998–1999) of the John Donne Society, receiving its 2002 Award for Distinguished Publication in Donne Studies for his book Doctrine and Devotion in Seventeenth-Century Poetry. He is a senior editor of Touchstone magazine.

His published essays and public lectures cover a wide variety of moral and religious topics as well as Renaissance, Medieval and twentieth-century literary theory and criticism. He is particularly well known for his writing on the works of 17th century English poets John Donne, Richard Crashaw, Henry Vaughan, and George Herbert.

Dr. Young received his B.A. in English from Rollins College and his M.Phil. and Ph.D. from Yale University. He is also a fluent reader and translator of Latin, as well as a convert to the Roman Catholic faith.

== Books ==
=== Author ===
- At War with the Word: Literary Theory and Liberal Education (Intercollegiate Studies Institute, 1999) (ISBN 1-882926-27-7)
- Doctrine & Devotion in Seventeenth-Century Poetry: Studies in Donne, Herbert, Crashaw, and Vaughan (Boydell & Brewer, 2000) (ISBN 0-85991-569-7)
- Richard Crashaw and the Spanish Golden Age (Yale studies in English) (Yale University Press, 1982) (ISBN 0-300-02766-4)
- A Student's Guide to Literature (Intercollegiate Studies Institute, 2000) (ISBN 1-882926-40-4)

=== Translator ===
- Principles of Letter-Writing: A Bilingual Text of Justi Lipsii Epistolica Institutio (Southern Illinois University Press, 1996) (ISBN 0-8093-1958-6)
