= Psalmi a Vidici ad Hebraicam veritatem castigati =

1530 printed psaltery authored by Thomas Cajetan

Psalmi da Vidici ad Hebraicam veritatem castigati
- Centro de Estudios de Historia de México Carso
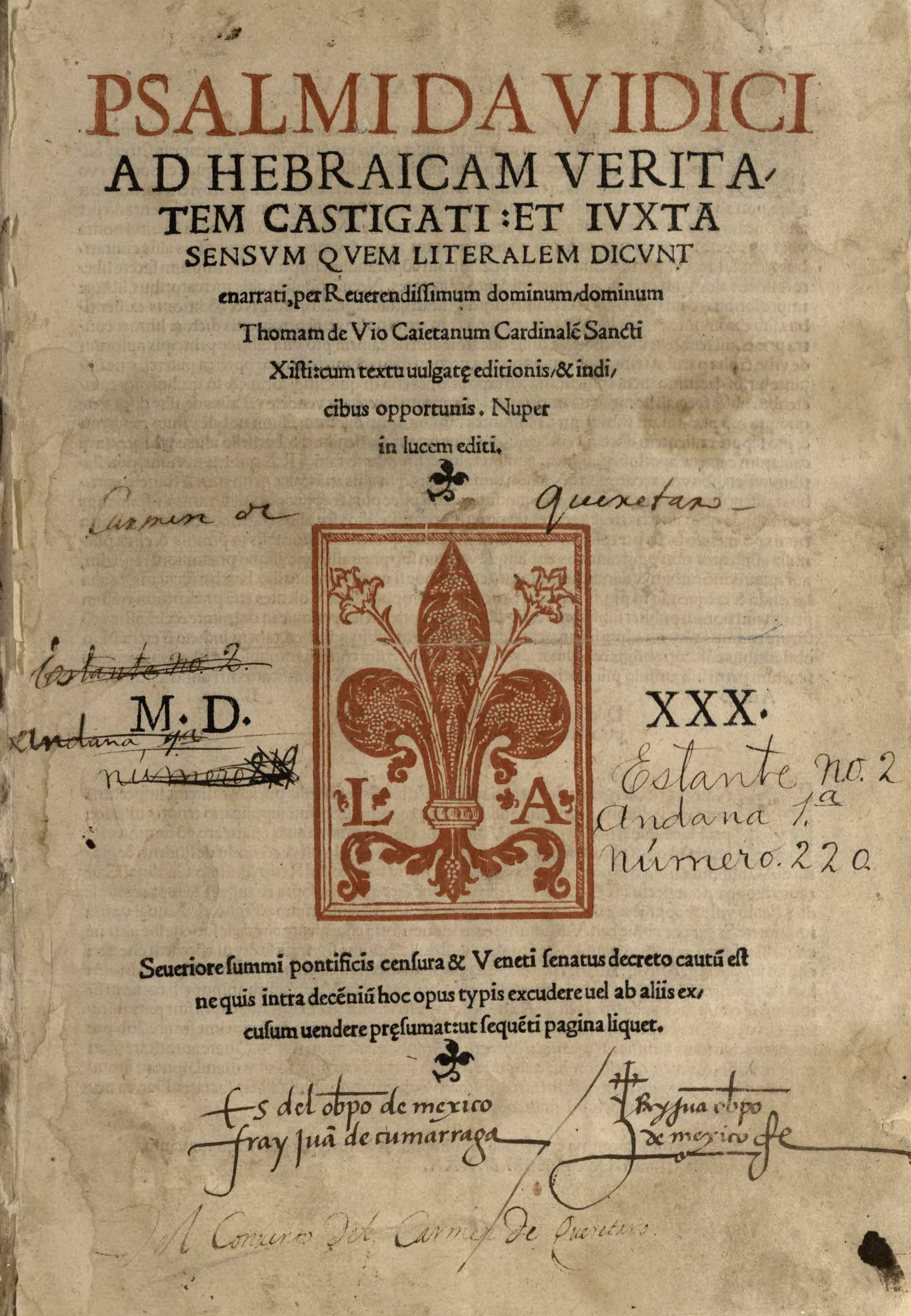
- Type: Book of Psalms
- Date: c. 1530
- Place of origin: Venice
- Language: Latin
- Author: Tomás Cayetano
- Exemplar: belonged to Fray Juan de Zumárraga.
- Previously kept: Discalced carmelitas in their headquarters of Querétaro

Psalmi da Vidici ad Hebraicam veritatem castigati is a printed psaltery authored by Thomas Cajetan and printed in Venice in 1530. It contains fragments of the Old Testament and specifically praises God and his laws. Most of it is made up of psalms attributed to King David, which were to be read in accordance with the rules of the ecclesiastical liturgy.

Its author was a general of the Dominican order and a Vatican diplomat, famous for polemics and for confronting opponents of the Catholic religion in the context of the imminent Protestant Reformation. In the preamble, Cayetano affirms that he prefers to study a Bible translated directly from Hebrew.

The copy that is conserved by the Center for the Study of Mexican History stands out because on its cover one can see the legend "es del obispo de mexico fray Juan de Zumárraga" (it is the bishop of Mexico Fray Juan de Zumárraga's) and inside are marginal annotations in a calligraphic style considered to date from the 16th century, probably written by the first archbishop of Mexico. This copy came to be under the protection of the Discalced Carmelites at their headquarters in Querétaro, which is also noted on the cover.
