= Connaught Marshner =

American political activist (born 1951)

- Born: Connaught Coyne; 1951 (age 74–75)
- Education: University of South Carolina
- Occupation: Political activist
- Movement: Christian right; New Right
- Spouse: William Marshner (m. 1973)
- Children: 5

Connaught Coyne Marshner (born 1951), also known as Connie Marshner, is an American religious conservative political activist and commentator, associated with the second wave of the American New Right. She was executive vice-president of the Free Congress Foundation, and chair of Ronald Reagan's Family Policy Advisory Board. She is the author of Blackboard Tyranny and Decent Exposure: How to Teach Your Children About Sex, and other works.

== Early life and education ==
Marshner's father was a captain in the U.S. Navy, and she lived in several states as a child. She graduated from the University of South Carolina with a degree in secondary education in English.

== Career ==
Marshner's political career began in 1971 at the University of South Carolina, where she was heavily involved in Young Americans for Freedom, a conservative political organization. After college, she became assistant to the editor of its magazine, New Guard, and wrote an influential critique of Walter Mondale's Child Development Bill that eventually led to its defeat. In 1973 she joined The Heritage Foundation as a researcher. Marshner was one of the leaders of the Kanawha County textbook controversy in 1974. At the time, she was education director at The Heritage Foundation and a speechwriter for conservative Republican congressmen, including Phil Crane. She organized a series of "Citizens' Workshops" to defend the rights of parents to select their own textbooks and discuss the possibility of starting parent-run schools. Her experiences in Kanawha County, West Virginia inspired her to write Blackboard Tyranny, a book that instructed conservative parents on how to start their own schools. By 1984, she was executive vice president of the Free Congress Foundation, making her the highest ranking woman in the New Right. In 1987, she left Washington, D.C. to concentrate on raising her three surviving children, accepting a position as general editor for a Christian publishing house and setting up a home office.

== Personal life ==
Since 1973, Marshner has been married to William Marshner, a Thomistic theologian, ethicist, and a founding professor at Christendom College in Front Royal, Virginia, with whom she has five children, four surviving.

== See also ==
- Christian right
