= Carso Center for the Study of Mexican History =

Mexican cultural institution

- Centro de Estudios de Historia de México Carso
- Coordinates: 19.34631°N 99.18425°W
- Collection size: around 800,000 items
- Founder: Ricardo García Sanza
- Owner: Fundación Carlos Slim
- Website: http://www.cehm.com.mx/

The Carso Center for the Study of Mexican History (in Spanish: Centro de Estudios de Historia de México Carso, CEHM-Carso) is a Mexican cultural institution devoted to the research, preservation and dissemination of Mexico's historical prints and documents from the 18th century to the 20th century. It is owned by the Carlos Slim Foundation (Fundación Carlos Slim), located in Chimalistac, south of Mexico City. It was founded in 1965 by Condumex.

The center is one of the founding members of UNESCO's World Digital Library. Its archives contain 700 documentary resources – about 2 million pages – and its library has 80,554 books (18 incunabula). The center has approximately 800,000 items.

== History ==
The center was founded by Conductores Mexicanos (Condumex). Its purpose was to rescue historically valuable resources –both bibliographical and documentary– to avoid their destruction because of the lack of preservation and prevent them from being sold to libraries and archives abroad.

This center was inaugurated in 1965 by Ricardo García Sáinz. The first acquisition of the center was a private collection of 10,000 books from the 19th century, which included resources from the Diocese of Guadalajara and correspondence amongst several characters involved in the Independence of Mexico.

The first board of trustees was composed of intellectuals such as Jesús Reyes Heroles, Ignacio Bernal, Silvio Zavala, Antonio Martínez Baez, and Alfonso Noriega.

Some of the center's collection items have been handed to the Mexican government, such as the 1917 Mexican Constitution's promulgation letter, signed by Venustiano Carranza, or the diary of the Mexican politician and historian Carlos María de Bustamante. Another notable book is Psalmi a Vidici ad Hebraicam veritatem castigati (Venice, 1530), that once was property of Fray Juan de Zumárraga.

In 1976, the center received its first interns from the National Autonomous University of Mexico: Josefina Moguel and María de Lourdes Martinez (nowadays, two prominent researchers).

After Dolores del Río's death, her photo archive was given to the center by Lewis Riley.

== See also ==
- Carlos Slim Helú
- History of Mexico
- World Digital Library
