= James Freeman (journalist) =

American journalist and author specializing in economics

James Freeman is an American journalist specializing in economics, assistant editorial page editor at The Wall Street Journal, and author.

Freeman is a graduate of Yale College. After graduation, he served as investor advocate at the U.S. Securities and Exchange Commission.

Freeman is co-author with Vern McKinley of Borrowed Time: Two Centuries of Booms, Busts and Bailouts at Citi, a 2018 history of Citigroup. The Financial Times describes it as a "rollicking" tale "of hubris, over-reach and outright catastrophe" which is especially "excellent" on "the US economy in the 19th century, and the extent to which it relied on cotton, an 'economy . . . built on America’s original sin, the monstrous institution of slavery'".

He is also the co-author with Maria Bartiromo of a book titled The Cost: Trump, China, and American Renewal which was published by Simon & Schuster in October 2020.

He is the son of Neal B. Freeman.
