= Paul A. Fisher =

American author and journalist

Paul A. Fisher (March 12, 1921 – December 5, 2007) was an American author and journalist.

== Early life ==
On March 12, 1921, Fisher was born in Indianapolis, Indiana. He graduated from the University of Notre Dame in 1943 and later attended Georgetown University School of Foreign Service as well as the American University in Washington, D.C. Fisher entered the U.S. Army and worked for OSS during World War II. He worked mainly in Italy and North Africa. During the Korean War, he served as a Counterintelligence officer.

In the late 1960s and early 1970s, he was a legislative assistant, for U.S. Representative James J. Delaney (D-N.Y.). After doing this work for eight years, he retired to Ireland for a short time.

== Journalist ==
When Fisher returned to the United States from Ireland, he began a new career as a journalist. He was the Washington Bureau Chief for Twin Circle Magazine and also worked as the feature editor for Triumph. He wrote for many years for such publications as the National Catholic Register and The Wanderer. He covered the conflict in Northern Ireland and was one of the reporters who traveled with Pope John Paul II.

His wife died in 1989 and, in 1994, he married his second wife, Irene Bock. Fisher was a member of such groups as the Knights of the Holy Sepulchre and the Knights of Columbus. He died on December 5, 2007, after suffering a stroke.

== Books ==
- Behind the Lodge Door: Church, State & Freemasonry in America
- Their God Is the Devil: Papal Encyclicals and Freemasonry
