= Thomas Cajetan =

Italian philosopher and cardinal (1469–1534)

His Eminence Thomas de Vio Cajetan OP
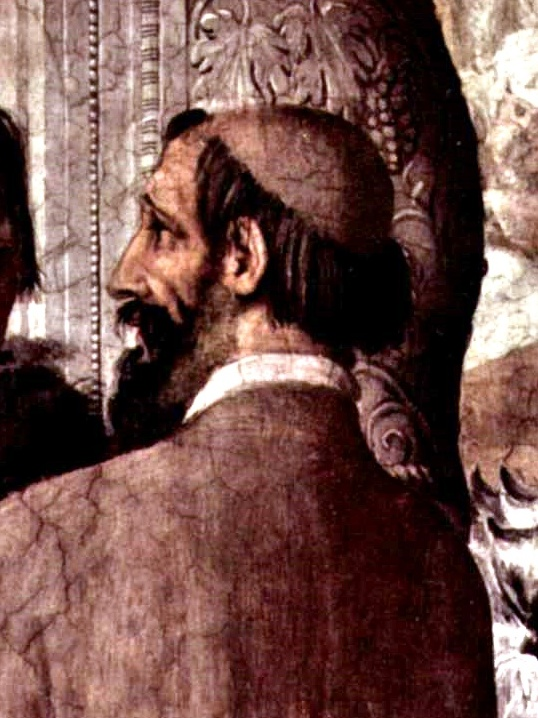
- Detail from Luther and Cardinal Gaetani by Francesco Salviati, c. 1550 – c. 1560
- Born: 20 February 1469; Gaeta, Kingdom of Naples
- Died: 9 August 1534 (aged 65); Rome, Papal States

Education
- Education: University of Padua

Philosophical work
- Era: Medieval philosophy
- Region: Western philosophy; Italian philosophy
- School: Thomism
- Main interests: Metaphysics; Logic; Theology; Analogy
- Notable works: Summula Caietani.
- Bishop of Gaeta
- Church: Catholic Church
- In office: 1519–1534
- Other post: Cardinal-Priest of San Sisto

Orders
- Ordination: 1491
- Consecration: 1 May 1518 by Niccolò Fieschi
- Created cardinal: 1 July 1517 by Pope Leo X

Thomas Cajetan OP (/ˈkædʒətən/ KAJ-ə-tən; 20 February 1469 – 9 August 1534), also known as Gaetanus or Cajetanus, commonly Tommaso de Vio or Thomas de Vio, was an Italian philosopher, theologian, the Master of the Order of Preachers 1508 to 1518, and cardinal from 1517 until his death. He was a leading theologian of his day who is now best known as the spokesman for Catholic opposition to the teachings of Martin Luther and the Protestant Reformation while he was the Pope's legate in Augsburg, and among Catholics for his extensive commentary on the Summa Theologiae of St. Thomas Aquinas.

He is not to be confused with his contemporary Saint Cajetan, the founder of the Theatines.

== Life ==
He was born in Gaeta, then part of the Kingdom of Naples, as Jacopo Vio. The name Tommaso was taken as his religious as a friar, while the surname Cajetan derives from his native city. At the age of fifteen, he entered the Dominican order and devoted himself to the study of the philosophy of St. Thomas Aquinas, becoming before the age of thirty a doctor of theology at Padua, and subsequently professor of metaphysics. A public disputation at Ferrara (1494) with Pico della Mirandola made his reputation as a theologian.

He became general procurator in 1507 and general of the Dominicans a year later in 1508.

In 1511 a group of dissident cardinals called the Conciliabulum of Pisa (1511–1512) against Pope Julius II, who had ignored the electoral capitulations he had accepted before being elected. Cajetan displayed vigorous support for the papacy in a series of publications. These were condemned by the Sorbonne and publicly burnt by order of King Louis XII.

At the Fifth Lateran Council (1512–17) which Pope Julius II set up in opposition to that of Pisa, De Vio played the leading role. During the second session of the council, in which he gave the opening oration, he obtained the approval of a decree recognizing the superiority of papal authority to that of councils.

Cajetan composed in defence of his position the Tractatus de Comparatione auctoritatis Papæ et conciliorum ad invicem. Jacques Almain answered this work, and Cajetan replied in his Apologia. Cajetan refused to accept Almain's argument that the Church's polity had to be similar to a lay regime, complete with limits on the ruler.

For his support of papal rights, Cajetan was made Bishop of Gaeta, and in 1517 would be made a cardinal and archbishop of Palermo by Pope Leo X.

In 1517, Leo X made him cardinal presbyter of San Sisto in Rome for his services. In the following year, he became Archbishop of Palermo. He resigned Palermo in 1519 to become Bishop of Gaeta, as granted him by the Emperor Charles V for whose election De Vio had laboured zealously.

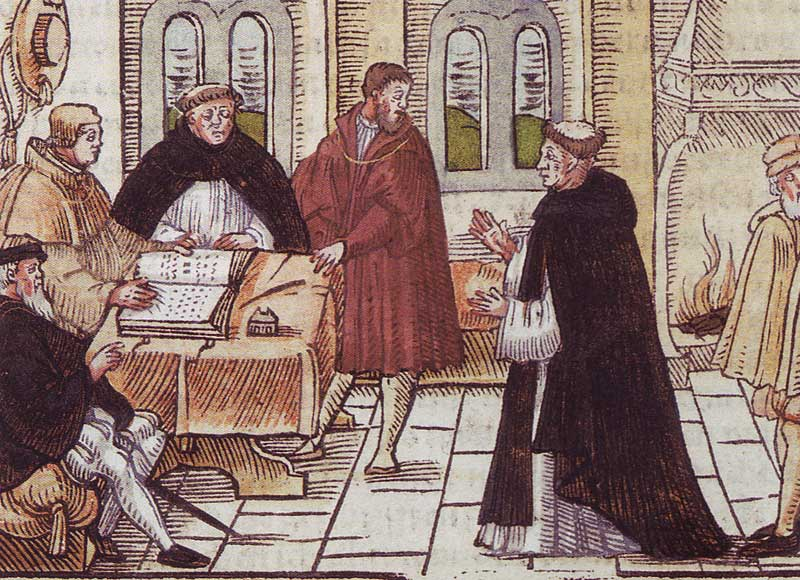
The meeting of Cajetan and Martin Luther

In 1518, Cajetan was sent as legate to the Diet of Augsburg and at the behest of the Frederick III, Elector of Saxony was entrusted with examining the teachings of Martin Luther. According to Hilaire Belloc, "[Luther] had not been treated roughly by his opponents, the roughness had been on his side. But things had gone against him, and he had been made to look foolish; he had been cross-examined into denying, for instance, the authority of a General Council — which authority was the trump card to play against the Papacy."

In 1519, Cajetan helped in drawing up the bill of excommunication against Luther.

Having proved to be an able diplomat and administrator, Cajetan was employed in several other negotiations and transactions. In conjunction with Cardinal Giulio de' Medici in the conclave of 1521–1522, he secured the election of Adrian Boeyens, then Bishop of Tortosa, as Pope Adrian VI. He retained influence under Pope Clement VII, suffered a short term of imprisonment after the storming of Rome by the Constable of Bourbon and by Frundsberg (1527), retired to his diocese for a few years, and, returning to Rome in 1530, assumed his old position of influence with Pope Clement, on whose behalf he drafted the decision rejecting the petition made by Henry VIII of England for the annulment of his marriage to Catharine of Aragon. Appointed by Clement VII to the commission of cardinals assigned to report on the "Nuremberg Recess", De Vio, in opposition to the majority, recommended certain concessions to the Lutherans, notably the marriage of the clergy as in the Greek Church and communion in both kinds according to the decision of the Council of Basel.

Cajetan died on August 9 in Rome in 1534.

== Views ==
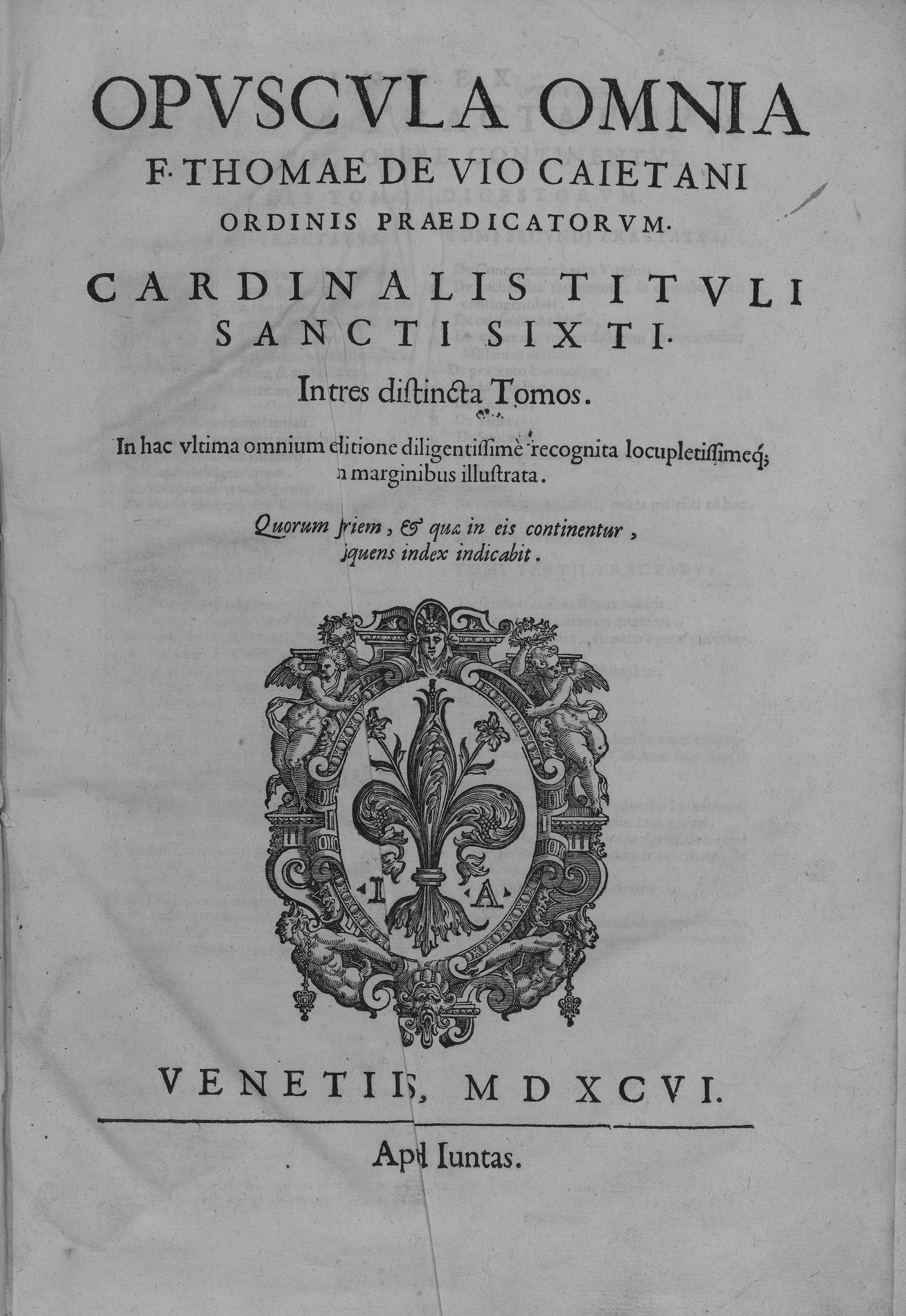
Opuscula omnia, 1596

=== Religion and Philosophy ===
As a philosopher and logician, Cajetan defended the idea of analogy.

Though as a theologian Cajetan was a scholastic of the older Thomist type, his general position was that of the moderate reformers of the school to which Reginald Pole, later archbishop of Canterbury, also belonged; i.e., he desired to retain the best elements of the humanist revival in harmony with Catholic orthodoxy illumined by a revived appreciation of the Augustinian doctrine of justification. In the field of Thomistic philosophy, he showed striking independence of judgment, expressing liberal views on marriage and divorce, denying the existence of a material Hell and advocating the celebration of public prayers in the vernacular.

Some Dominicans regarded his views as too independent of those of Saint Thomas. The Sorbonne in Paris found some of these views heterodox, and in the 1570 edition of his celebrated commentary on Aquinas' Summa, the objectionable passages were expunged. In this spirit, he wrote commentaries upon portions of Aristotle and upon the Summa of Aquinas, and towards the end of his life made a careful translation of the Old and New Testaments, excepting Solomon's Song, the Prophets and the Revelation of St John. Cajetan also wrote opinions on subjects of practical importance, such as the disposition of plundered goods whose ownership could not be determined.

Of the Reformation he remained a steadfast opponent, composing several works directed against Martin Luther, and taking an important part in shaping the policy of the papal delegates in Germany. Learned though he was in the scholastics, he recognized that to fight the reformers he would need a deeper knowledge of the Scriptures than he possessed. To this study he devoted himself with characteristic zeal, wrote commentaries on the greater part of the Old and the New Testament, and in the exposition of his text, which he treated critically, allowed himself considerable latitude in departing from literal and traditional interpretations.

Cajetan was a man of austere piety and fervent zeal. And from the standpoint of the Dominican idea of the supreme necessity of maintaining ecclesiastical discipline, he defended the rights of the papacy and proclaimed that the pope should be "the mirror of God on earth."

In Aeterni Patris, Pope Leo XIII cited Cajetan as to why St. Thomas and the Thomistic school as a whole shall be the fundamental school of the Roman Catholic Church, which marked the revival of Thomism starting Neo-scholasticism or the Neo-Thomist movement. He says: "Among the Scholastic Doctors, the chief and master of all towers Thomas Aquinas, who, as [Cardinal] Cajetan observes, because 'he most venerated the ancient doctors of the Church, in a certain way seems to have inherited the intellect of all.'" This would further influence the Church, and in 1923, by Pope Pius XI in Studiorum Ducem, made St. Thomas Aquinas officially titled as the Common Doctor (or Universal Doctor) of the Church, in Latin: Doctor Communis.

=== Views on papal authority ===
Against the Council of Pisa's advocacy of conciliarism, which placed the authority of a general council above the pope's authority, Cajetan responded that a general council could only judge a pope if the pope had become a heretic. In the case of a wicked but non-heretical pope, Cajetan insisted that resistance is sufficient to reduce abuses, while deposition is inadmissible as a council convened without a pope would be "headless" (using the scriptural analogy of the relationship between sheep and their shepherd). In the case of heresy, however, Cajetan wrote that an exceptional general council could be convened to grant the reigning pope a fair hearing, and if he was judged to be in heresy, the council could act to sever the bond between the man holding the papacy and the office itself. However, he denied that this action constituted the council acting over the pope, which he regarded as theologically impossible. Rather, he considered that such an action merely indicated that the council could undo the election of that particular man to the office of the pope (since the election was also performed by human beings). Cajetan, building on similar discussions from John of Paris and Augustinus Triumphus regarding the removal of heretical popes, interpreted Titus 3:10 as saying that a heretical pope should be deposed after two admonitions.

=== Economic thoughts ===
In light of the contemporary economic development, Cajetan cogitated a lot about the morality of trade. More conservative than the future School of Salamanca, his reflections were nonetheless quite modern with utilisation of practical consideration outside of pure theorical thinking and some relevant ideas, like the formulation of the liquidity preference.

However his views on usury were still conservative, as showed by his condemnation of mounts of piety (that he tried unsuccessfully to ban during the Fifth Council of the Lateran), his disapproval of usury or his prohibition of contractum trinius.

== Scholastic assessment ==
=== On Aquinas ===
Pope Leo XIII mandated that Cajetan's Commentary on the Summa Theologiae be read alongside the actual Summa. William Marshner notes: "When Leo [XIII] promulgated Aeterni Patris in 1879, he stipulated that the "Leonine," or official, edition of the Summa should always be printed in conjunction with Cajetan’s Commentary. For five hundred years they were studied together. Generations were trained by reading through the Summa article by article with Cajetan’s commentaries in hand."

=== On Analogy ===
Cajetan was noted by the Thomist school that his work, The Analogy of Names (De nominum analogia) was the most comprehensive and exhaustive resource on the topic of analogy, that it became known as the only thing one ought to read.

John of St. Thomas says: "As regards difficulties in analogy which are of a rather metaphysical nature, Cajetan has discussed them so so extensively and so thoroughly in his little treatise The Analogy of Names, that he has not left us any opportunity to think out another one."

Cajetan's contemporary, Francesco Silvestri da Ferrara or Sylvester Ferrera (Francis Sylvester of Ferrera), says: "As regards other difficulties which may be raised concerning the analogy of names, if you want to understand them fully, you should consult the most ingenious work, The Analogy of Names, written by the Most Reverend Thomas Cajetan." Furthermore, even with their disagreements regarding being [ente], that through an exchanging of letters, Cajetan wrote a response which is now in the Index of the english translation of the Analogy of Names, called "The Concept of Being."

== Modern assessment ==
=== On Aquinas ===
In the mid-twentieth century, Cajetan's thought came to be assessed negatively by certain Catholic commentators who, in reacting against neo-Thomist thought, portrayed Cajetan as the first person to make mistaken interpretations of the thought of Thomas Aquinas.

Fergus Kerr wrote a 2002 book, After Aquinas, attacking Cajetan on this. Among others, he cited Étienne Gilson, who was responding to arguments that 'philosophy' and 'Christianity' were incompatible disciplines, there existed in Hellenistic Judaism, patristic thought and the medieval period a way of thinking, animated by the ancient Greek quest for the cause of being, which could rightly be called 'Christian philosophy'. In Gilson's account, it was in Cajetan's thought that this link was first broken, since Cajetan, influenced by Scotism, reduced Thomas Aquinas's metaphysics of the existential act of being to an ontology of substance. Cajetan and his successors therefore, in Gilson's account, represented Thomas as focused on the forms and essences of beings only, and not on the existence of all things as participation in the pure actuality which is God. Accordingly, for Gilson, 'philosophy' and 'Christianity' are only incompatible if Christian thought is understood in its tradition post-Cajetan—a tradition which is worse than the older, more distinguished tradition of Christian thought. Henri de Lubac wrote in Surnaturel (1946), an account of Aquinas’ views on the natural and the supernatural, that Cajetan's interpretation of Aquinas, while influential, was incorrect. De Lubac argued that Cajetan treated Aquinas as an Aristotelian, working with a definition of nature from Aristotle's Physics, which effectively turned human nature into a reality essentially closed in on itself, with its own intrinsic powers, desires and goals. De Lubac did not think Aquinas was an Aristotelian, and that subsequent Catholic thought produced mistaken readings of Thomas Aquinas's account of the relationship between nature and grace.

In 2006, Ralph McInerny and other scholars challenged the negative assessment of Cajetan's work made by De Lubac and Gilson. McInerny writes that the criticisms of Cajetan are not in fact supported by evidence from his works, and furthermore that it is not Cajetan but Gilson whose interpretation of Aquinas is a departure from the latter's beliefs.

In 2024, William Marshner translated Cajetan's Commentary of the Prima Pars of the Summa Theologiae, with one of his many reasons being the Theological and Philosophical sphere within the Church (and even outside) growing more and more interested in Thomism as a school, saying: "Recently, serious thinkers of all denominations – and none – have found new reasons to be interested in St. Thomas. His text is deceptively simple, yet important issues are handled in every article, sometimes below the surface. Cajetan extracts these hidden issues, and explains and elaborates on them with remarkable affinity to modern analytical philosophy. Part of that affinity lies in the use of modal logic, a tool whose importance was overlooked between the Renaissance and the twentieth century." Marshner also notes that: "Cajetan’s work as a commentator came under a cloud after Vatican II, thanks primarily to the rising influence of Cardinal Henri de Lubac and Etienne Gilson. These and other famous writers thought that Cajetan’s commentaries were too fussy, detailed, and even nit-picking. When I started reading these commentaries, however, I was struck not only by how helpful they were but also how well they defended the work of Saint Thomas against objections raised in the two hundred years prior to Cajetan. I had jumped into them because I was teaching a course on the Trinity, and St. Thomas began his treatise on the Trinity with the issue of the processions within God. Without Cajetan’s commentary on Q. 27, A.1, the modern reader had no clue as to how controversial the issue of these processions had become in St. Thomas’s day. That one commentary alone made it possible to understand medieval intellectual history."

=== Other ===
Bruce Metzger wrote that Cajetan's biblical commentaries were surprisingly "modern", anticipating biblical textual criticism. Notably, Cajetan revived earlier Christian doubts as to the apostolic authorship of the Epistles of James, Jude, 2 John, and 3 John, as well as opposing Pauline authorship of the Epistle to the Hebrews.

== Works ==
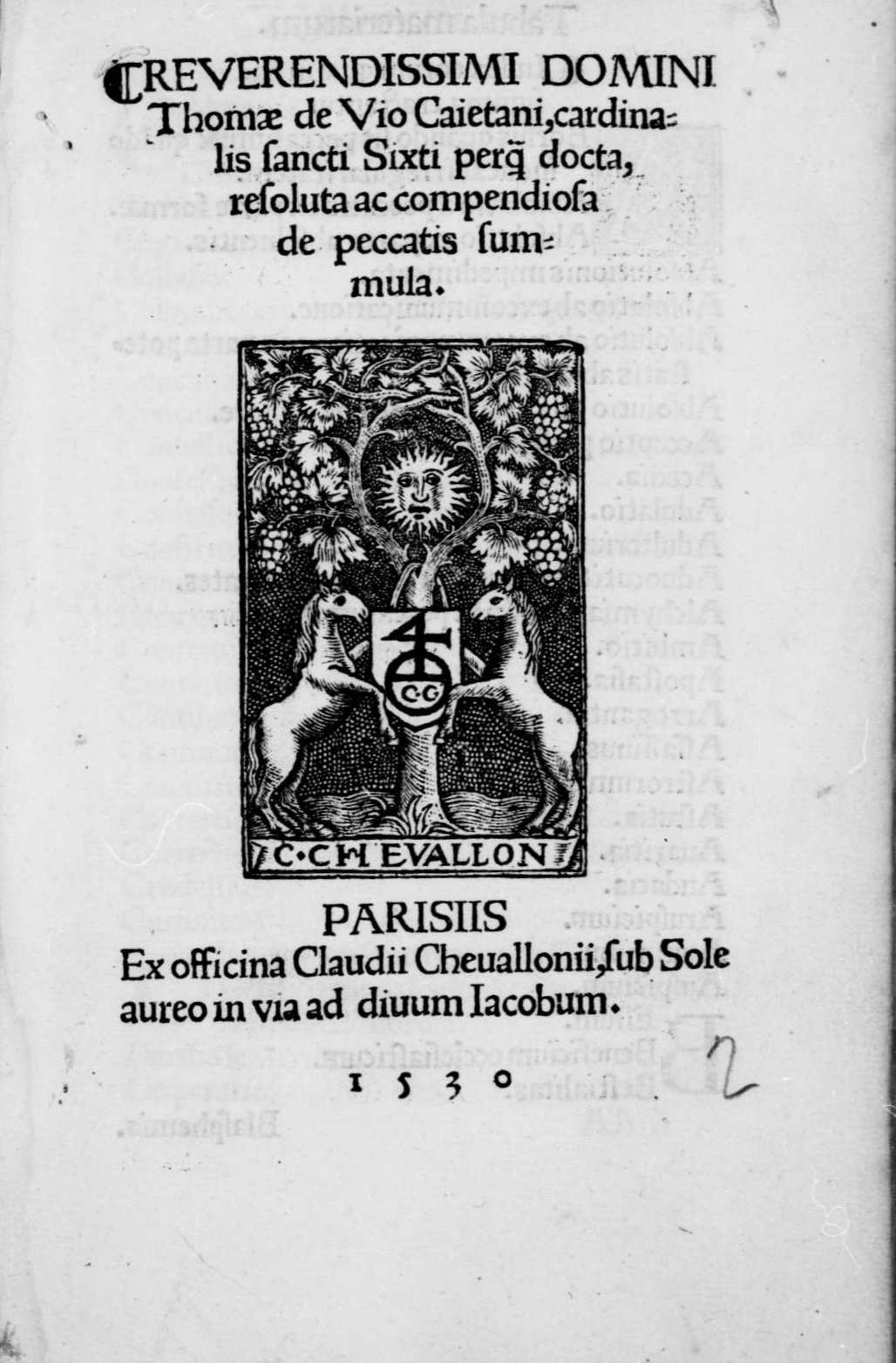
Summula Caietani, 1530

- Opera omnia (5 vols., 1639)
- Opuscula omnia (1530)
- Summula Caietani (in Latin). Paris: Claude Chevallon. 1530.
- Commentary on Saint Thomas' Summa theologiae (1540)
- De divina institutione Pontificatus Romani Pontificis (1521)
- In Porphyrii Isagogen (1934)
- De comparatione auctoritatis papae and Apologia (1936)
- De Anima (1938)
- Scripta philosophica (6 vols., edited by P. Zammit, M.-H. Laurent and J. Coquelle, 1934–39)
- Psalmi a Vidici ad Hebraicam veritatem castigati (1530)

Catholic Church titles
Preceded by Jean Clérée	Master General of the Dominican Order; 1508–1518	Succeeded by García de Loaysa
Preceded by Achille Grassi	Cardinal-Priest of San Sisto; 1517–1534	Succeeded by Nikolaus von Schönberg
Preceded by Francisco de Remolins	Archbishop of Palermo; 1518–1519	Succeeded by Giovanni Carandolet
Preceded by Fernando Herrera (bishop)	Bishop of Gaeta; 1519–1534	Succeeded by Esteban Gabriel Merino
Preceded by Ippolito de' Medici	Cardinal-Priest of Santa Prassede; 1534	Succeeded by Francesco Cornaro (cardinal)
