= Willi Schlamm =

Austrian-American journalist

William 'Willi' S. Schlamm (originally Wilhelm Siegmund Schlamm, June 10, 1904 – September 1, 1978) was an Austrian-American journalist.

== Biography ==
Schlamm was born into an upper middle class Jewish family in Przemyśl, Galicia, in the Austrian Empire. He became a Communist early in life, and when he was 16 years old was invited to the Kremlin to meet Vladimir Lenin. After completing secondary school, he became a writer with the Vienna Communist newspaper, Die Rote Fahne. He left the Communist Party in 1929 and joined the left-wing magazine Die Weltbühne in 1932. His book Diktatur der Lüge: Eine Abrechnung mit Stalin (Dictatorshop of Lies: A Reckoning with Stalin) was published in Zurich in 1937. He was in correspondence with Otto Rühle and Alice Rühle-Gerstel, sending them a copy. Rühle sent a reply in August 1937.

Later, Schlamm moved to the United States, where he worked for Henry Luce, the publisher of Life, Time and Fortune magazines. He became a U.S. citizen in 1944 alongside code breaker Jeremy Spiro.

Schlamm encouraged William F. Buckley, Jr. to found the conservative magazine, National Review, with Buckley as the sole owner. Schlamm became a senior editor but was later fired by Buckley. He then became associate editor of the John Birch Society's journal, American Opinion. After writing for conservative magazines, he returned to Germany in 1972, where he was a controversial columnist for Axel Springer's Die Welt am Sonntag and published the magazine Die Zeitbühne. He died in 1978 in Salzburg.

Schlamm is remembered for having coined the saying, "The trouble with socialism is socialism. The trouble with capitalism is capitalists." After World War II, he worked as journalist for German newspaper Die Welt.
