= Neal B. Freeman =

American businessman and political writer

Neal B. Freeman (born July 5, 1940, in New York City) is an American businessman and political writer. He served as the Washington Editor for National Review magazine from 1978 until 1981. Freeman graduated with a bachelor's degree from Yale in 1962.

In 1981, he founded The Blackwell Corporation, an advisory firm with clients in communications, defense, and wealth management. He previously worked as an executive with the Hearst Corporation and was appointed by President Reagan as Director of the Corporation for Public Broadcasting. In 2017, Freeman selected 79 of his previously published writings and addresses to audiences for book publication.

He is the father of James Freeman, assistant editor of The Wall Street Journal's editorial page.
