= National Review =

American editorial magazine

- Cover for August 30, 2010
- Editor-in-Chief: Rich Lowry
- Categories: Editorial magazine, American conservatism
- Frequency: Monthly
- Publisher: E. Garrett Bewkes IV
- Total circulation: 75,000 (2022)
- Founder: William F. Buckley Jr.
- First issue: November 19, 1955; 70 years ago
- Company: National Review, Inc.
- Country: United States
- Based in: New York City, New York, U.S.
- Language: English
- Website: www.nationalreview.com
- ISSN: 0028-0038 (print); 2769-9587 (web)
- OCLC: 1759389

National Review is an American conservative editorial magazine, focusing on news and commentary pieces on political, social, and cultural affairs. The magazine was founded by William F. Buckley Jr. in 1955. National Review's editor-in-chief is Rich Lowry, and its editor is Ramesh Ponnuru.

Since its founding, the magazine has played a significant role in the development of conservatism in the United States, helping to define its boundaries and promoting fusionism while establishing itself as a leading voice on the American right. While National Review generally supports Republican politicians and policy priorities, the magazine has been critical of President Donald Trump since the 2016 presidential election.

== History ==
=== Background ===
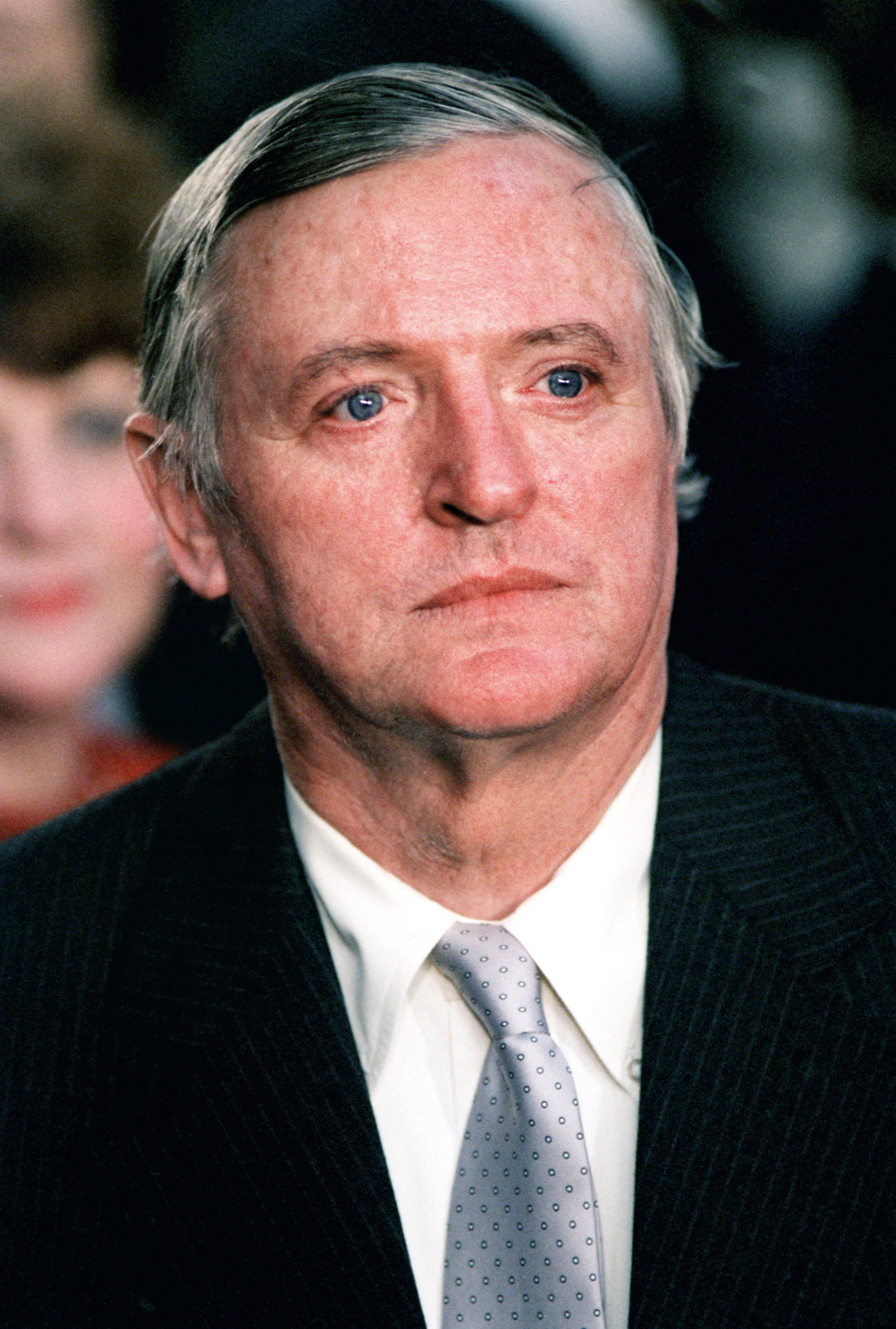
William F. Buckley Jr., the founder and first editor of National Review, pictured in 1985

Before National Review's founding in 1955, the American right was a largely unorganized collection of people who shared intertwining philosophies but had little opportunity for a united public voice. They wanted to marginalize the antiwar, noninterventionistic views of the Old Right.

In 1953, moderate Republican Dwight D. Eisenhower was president, and many major magazines such as the Saturday Evening Post, Time, and Reader's Digest were strongly conservative and anti-communist, as were many newspapers including the Chicago Tribune and St. Louis Globe-Democrat. A few small-circulation conservative magazines, such as Human Events and The Freeman, preceded National Review in developing Cold War conservatism in the 1950s.

In 1953, Russell Kirk published The Conservative Mind, which traced an intellectual bloodline from Edmund Burke to the Old Right in the early 1950s. This challenged the notion among intellectuals that no coherent conservative tradition existed in the United States.

A young William F. Buckley Jr. was greatly influenced by Kirk's concepts. Buckley had money; his father grew rich from oil fields in Mexico. He first tried to purchase Human Events, but was turned down. He then met Willi Schlamm, the experienced editor of The Freeman; they would spend the next two years raising the $300,000 necessary to start their own weekly magazine, originally to be called National Weekly. (A magazine holding the trademark to the name prompted the change to National Review.) The statement of intentions read:

Middle-of-the-Road, qua Middle of the Road, is politically, intellectually, and morally repugnant. We shall recommend policies for the simple reason that we consider them right (rather than "non-controversial"); and we consider them right because they are based on principles we deem right (rather than on popularity polls)... The New Deal revolution, for instance, could hardly have happened save for the cumulative impact of The Nation and The New Republic, and a few other publications, on several American college generations during the twenties and thirties.

=== Founding ===
On November 19, 1955, Buckley's magazine began to take shape. Buckley assembled an eclectic group of writers: traditionalists, Catholic intellectuals, libertarians, and anti-communists. The group included Revilo P. Oliver, Russell Kirk, James Burnham, Frank Meyer, and Willmoore Kendall, and Catholics L. Brent Bozell and Garry Wills. The former Time editor Whittaker Chambers, who had been a Communist spy in the 1930s and then turned intensely anti-communist, became a senior editor. In the magazine's founding statement Buckley wrote:

The launching of a conservative weekly journal of opinion in a country widely assumed to be a bastion of conservatism at first glance looks like a work of supererogation, rather like publishing a royalist weekly within the walls of Buckingham Palace. It is not that of course; if National Review is superfluous, it is so for very different reasons: It stands athwart history, yelling Stop, at a time when no other is inclined to do so, or to have much patience with those who so urge it.

As editors and contributors, Buckley sought out intellectuals who were ex-Communists or had once worked on the far left, including Whittaker Chambers, William Schlamm, John Dos Passos, Frank Meyer, and James Burnham. When James Burnham became one of the original senior editors, he urged the adoption of a more pragmatic editorial position that would extend the influence of the magazine toward the political center. Smant (1991) finds that Burnham overcame sometimes heated opposition from other members of the editorial board (including Meyer, Schlamm, William Rickenbacker, and the magazine's publisher William A. Rusher), and had a significant effect on both the editorial policy of the magazine and on the thinking of Buckley himself.

National Review aimed to make conservative ideas respectable in an age when the dominant view of conservative thought was, as expressed by Columbia professor Lionel Trilling,

[L]iberalism is not only the dominant but even the sole intellectual tradition. For it is the plain fact that nowadays there are no conservative or reactionary ideas in general circulation... the conservative impulse and the reactionary impulse do not... express themselves in ideas but only... in irritable mental gestures which seek to resemble ideas.

Buckley said that National Review "is out of place because, in its maturity, literate America rejected conservatism in favor of radical social experimentation... since ideas rule the world, the ideologues, having won over the intellectual class, simply walked in and started to... run just about everything. There never was an age of conformity quite like this one, or a camaraderie quite like the Liberals.'

=== Goldwater era ===
National Review promoted Barry Goldwater heavily during the early 1960s. Buckley and others involved with the magazine took a major role in the "Draft Goldwater" movement in 1960 and the 1964 presidential campaign. National Review spread his vision of conservatism throughout the country.

The early National Review faced occasional defections from both left and right. Garry Wills broke with National Review and became a liberal commentator. Buckley's brother-in-law, L. Brent Bozell Jr. left and started the short-lived traditionalist Catholic magazine, Triumph in 1966.

Buckley and Meyer promoted the idea of enlarging the boundaries of conservatism through fusionism, whereby different schools of conservatives, including libertarians, would work together to combat what were seen as their common opponents.

Buckley and his editors used his magazine to define the boundaries of conservatism—and to exclude people or ideas or groups they considered unworthy of the conservative title. Therefore, they attacked the John Birch Society (JBS), George Wallace, and antisemites. Buckley's goal was to increase the respectability of the conservative movement; in 2004, current editor Rich Lowry, compiled various quotes of articles commenting on Buckley's retirement including from The Dallas Morning News: "Mr. Buckley's first great achievement was to purge the American right of its kooks. He marginalized the antisemites, the John Birchers, the nativists and their sort." However, others such as political historian Matthew Dallek, contend that while the mainstream view has long been that Buckley excluded Bircherism, his "gesture toward kicking out the Birchers was far more concerned with cordoning off [JBS founder] Robert Welch while retaining the support of the rank-and-file members."

In 1957, National Review editorialized in favor of white leadership in the South, arguing that "the central question that emerges ... is whether the White community in the South is entitled to take such measures as are necessary to prevail, politically and culturally, in areas where it does not predominate numerically? The sobering answer is Yes – the White community is so entitled because, for the time being, it is the advanced race." By the 1970s National Review advocated colorblind policies and the end of affirmative action.

In the late 1960s, the magazine denounced segregationist George Wallace, who ran in Democratic primaries in 1964 and 1972 and made an independent run for president in 1968. During the 1950s, Buckley had worked to remove antisemitism from the conservative movement and barred holders of those views from working for National Review. In 1962, Buckley denounced Robert W. Welch Jr. and the John Birch Society as "far removed from common sense" and urged the Republican Party to purge itself of Welch's influence.

=== Supporting Reagan ===
After Goldwater was defeated by Lyndon Johnson in 1964, Buckley and National Review continued to champion the idea of a conservative movement, which was increasingly embodied in Ronald Reagan. Reagan, a longtime subscriber to National Review, became politically prominent during Goldwater's campaign. National Review supported his challenge to President Gerald Ford in 1976 and his successful 1980 campaign.

During the 1980s, National Review called for tax cuts, supply-side economics, the Strategic Defense Initiative, and support for President Reagan's foreign policy against the Soviet Union. The magazine criticized the welfare state and would support the welfare reform proposals of the 1990s. The magazine also regularly criticized President Bill Clinton. It first embraced and then rejected Pat Buchanan in his political campaigns. A lengthy 1996 National Review editorial called for a "movement toward" drug legalization.

In 1985, National Review and Buckley were represented by attorney J. Daniel Mahoney during the magazine's $16 million libel suit against The Spotlight.

== Political views and content ==
Victor Davis Hanson, a regular contributor since 2001, sees a broad spectrum of conservative and anti-liberal contributors:

In other words, a wide conservative spectrum—paleo-conservatives, neo-conservatives, Tea Party movement activists, the deeply religious and the agnostic, both libertarians and social conservatives, free-marketeers and the more protectionist—characterizes National Review. The common requisite is that they present their views as a critique of prevailing liberal orthodoxy but do so analytically and with decency and respect.

The magazine has been described as "the bible of American conservatism".

=== First Trump era ===
In 2016, the magazine published an editorial titled "Against Trump", calling Donald Trump a "philosophically unmoored political opportunist" and announcing its adamant and uniform opposition to his presidential candidacy for the Republican nomination for president. After Trump's 2016 electoral victory over Hillary Clinton, and through his administration, the National Review editorial board continued to criticize him. However, some National Review and National Review Online contributors took more varied positions on Trump. Hanson, for instance, supports him, while others, such as editor Ramesh Ponnuru and contributor Jonah Goldberg, have remained uniformly critical of Trump. In a Washington Post feature on conservative magazines, T.A. Frank noted: "From the perspective of a reader, these tensions make National Review as lively as it has been in a long time."

=== Second Trump era ===
In January 2024, the magazine published an editorial titled "“Republican Voters Can — And Should — Rethink Nominating Trump”, in which they warned Republican voters against choosing Trump as the Republican Party's nominee in the then-upcoming 2024 United States presidential elections.

== National Review Online ==
A popular web version of the magazine, National Review Online ("N.R.O."), includes a digital version of the magazine, with articles updated daily by National Review writers, and conservative blogs. The online version is called N.R.O. to distinguish it from the printed magazine. It also features free articles, though these deviate in content from its print magazine. The site's editor is Phillip Klein, who replaced Charles C. W. Cooke.

Each day, the site posts new content consisting of conservative, libertarian, and neoconservative opinion articles, including some syndicated columns, and news features.

It also features two blogs:

- The Corner is a selection of postings from a group of the site's editors and affiliated writers discussing the issues of the day.
- Bench Memos provides legal and judicial news and commentary.

Markos Moulitsas, who runs the liberal Daily Kos website, told reporters in August 2007 that he does not read conservative blogs, with the exception of those on N.R.O.: "I do like the blogs at the National Review—I do think their writers are the best in the [conservative] blogosphere," he said.

== National Review Institute ==
The N.R.I. works in policy development and helping establish new advocates in the conservative movement. National Review Institute was founded by William F. Buckley Jr. in 1991 to engage in policy development, public education, and advocacy that would advance the conservative principles he championed.

In 2019, the Whittaker Chambers family prevailed on the N.R.I. to cease an award in Chambers' name, after an award to people whom the family found objectionable.

== Finances ==
As with most political opinion magazines in the United States, National Review carries little corporate advertising. The magazine stays afloat from subscription fees, donations, and black-tie fundraisers around the country. The magazine also sponsors cruises featuring National Review editors and contributors as lecturers.

Buckley said in 2005 that the magazine had lost about $25,000,000 over 50 years.

== Presidential primary endorsements ==
National Review sometimes endorses a candidate during the primary election season. Editors at National Review have said, "Our guiding principle has always been to select the most conservative viable candidate." This statement echoes what has come to be called "The Buckley Rule". In a 1967 interview, in which he was asked about the choice of presidential candidate, Buckley said, "The wisest choice would be the one who would win... I'd be for the most right, viable candidate who could win."

These candidates were endorsed by National Review:

- 1956: Dwight Eisenhower
- 1960: No endorsement
- 1964: Barry Goldwater
- 1968: Richard Nixon
- 1972: John M. Ashbrook
- 1976: Ronald Reagan
- 1980: No endorsement
- 1984: Ronald Reagan
- 1988: George H. W. Bush
- 1992: No endorsement
- 1996: No endorsement
- 2000: George W. Bush
- 2004: No endorsement
- 2008: Mitt Romney
- 2012: No endorsement
- 2016: Ted Cruz
- 2020: No endorsement
- 2024: No endorsement

== Editors and contributors ==
The magazine's editor-in-chief is Rich Lowry. Many of the magazine's commentators are affiliated with think-tanks such as The Heritage Foundation and American Enterprise Institute. Prominent guest authors have included Newt Gingrich, Mitt Romney, Peter Thiel, and Ted Cruz in the online and print edition.

=== Contributors ===
Contributors to National Review (N.R.) magazine, National Review Online (N.R.O.), or both:

- Elliott Abrams
- Richard Brookhiser, senior editor
- Charles C. W. Cooke, editor of N.R.O..
- Frederick H. Fleitz
- John Fund, N.R.O. national-affairs columnist
- Jim Geraghty
- Paul Johnson
- Roger Kimball
- Larry Kudlow
- Stanley Kurtz
- Yuval Levin
- James Lileks
- Rob Long, N.R. contributing editor
- Kathryn Jean Lopez
- Rich Lowry, N.R. editor
- Andrew C. McCarthy
- John McCormack, N.R. Washington, D.C. correspondent
- John J. Miller, N.R. national political reporter
- Stephen Moore, financial columnist
- Deroy Murdock
- Jay Nordlinger
- John O'Sullivan, N.R. editor-at-large
- Ramesh Ponnuru
- David Pryce-Jones
- Noah Rothman
- Reihan Salam
- Armond White

=== Past contributors ===
- Renata Adler
- Steve Allen
- Wick Allison
- W. H. Auden
- Edward C. Banfield
- Jacques Barzun
- Peter L. Berger
- Tom Bethell
- Allan Bloom
- George Borjas
- Robert Bork
- L. Brent Bozell Jr.
- Peter Brimelow
- Pat Buchanan
- Jed Babbin
- Myrna Blyth
- Christopher Buckley
- William F. Buckley Jr., founder
- James Burnham
- John R. Chamberlain
- Whittaker Chambers
- Mona Charen
- Shannen W. Coffin
- Robert Conquest
- Richard Corliss
- Robert Costa
- Ann Coulter
- Arlene Croce
- Ted Cruz
- Guy Davenport
- John Derbyshire
- Joan Didion
- John Dos Passos
- Rod Dreher
- Dinesh D'Souza
- John Gregory Dunne
- Max Eastman
- Eric Ehrmann
- Thomas Fleming
- Samuel T. Francis
- David French
- Milton Friedman
- David Frum
- Francis Fukuyama
- Eugene Genovese
- Paul Gigot
- Nathan Glazer
- Jonah Goldberg
- Mark M. Goldblatt
- Stuart Goldman
- Paul Gottfried
- Michael Graham
- Ethan Gutmann
- Ernest van den Haag
- Victor Davis Hanson
- Jeffrey Hart
- Henry Hazlitt
- Will Herberg
- Christopher Hitchens
- Harry V. Jaffa
- Arthur Jensen
- John Keegan
- Willmoore Kendall
- Hugh Kenner
- Florence King
- Phil Kerpen
- Russell Kirk
- Charles Krauthammer
- Irving Kristol
- Dave Kopel
- Erik von Kuehnelt-Leddihn
- Michael Ledeen
- Fritz Leiber
- John Leonard
- Mark Levin
- John Lukacs
- Arnold Lunn
- Richard Lynn
- Alasdair MacIntyre
- Harvey C. Mansfield
- Malachi Martin
- Frank Meyer
- Scott McConnell
- Forrest McDonald
- Ludwig von Mises
- Alice-Leone Moats
- Raymond Moley
- Thomas Molnar
- Charles Murray
- Richard Neuhaus
- Robert Nisbet
- Michael Novak
- Robert Novak
- Michael Oakeshott
- Kate O'Beirne
- Conor Cruise O'Brien
- Revilo P. Oliver
- Thomas Pangle
- Isabel Paterson
- Ezra Pound
- Paul Craig Roberts
- Murray Rothbard
- William A. Rusher, publisher, 1957–88
- J. Philippe Rushton
- Steve Sailer
- Pat Sajak
- Catherine Seipp
- Daniel Seligman
- Ben Shapiro
- John Simon
- Joseph Sobran
- Thomas Sowell
- Mark Steyn
- Whit Stillman
- Theodore Sturgeon
- Thomas Szasz
- Allen Tate
- Jared Taylor
- Terry Teachout
- Taki Theodoracopulos
- Katherine Timpf
- Ralph de Toledano
- Auberon Waugh
- Evelyn Waugh
- Richard M. Weaver
- Robert Weissberg
- Frederick Wilhelmsen
- George F. Will
- Kevin D. Williamson
- Garry Wills
- James Q. Wilson
- Tom Wolfe
- Byron York
- R. V. Young

=== Washington editors ===
- L. Brent Bozell Jr.
- Neal B. Freeman
- George Will
- Neal B. Freeman
- John McLaughlin
- William McGurn
- Kate O'Beirne
- Robert Costa
- Eliana Johnson

== Controversies ==
=== Climate change denial ===
According to Philip Bump of The Washington Post, National Review "has regularly criticized and rejected the scientific consensus on climate change". In 2015, the magazine published an intentionally deceptive graph which suggested that there was no climate change. The graph set the lower and upper bounds of the chart at -10 and 110 degrees Fahrenheit and zoomed out so as to obscure warming trends.

In 2017, National Review published an article alleging that a top NOAA scientist claimed that the National Oceanic and Atmospheric Administration engaged in data manipulation and rushed a study based on faulty data in order to influence the Paris climate negotiations. The article largely repeated allegations made in the Daily Mail without independent verification. The scientist in question later rejected the claims made by National Review, noting that he did not accuse NOAA of data manipulation but instead raised concerns about "the way data was handled, documented and stored, raising issues of transparency and availability".

In 2014, climate scientist Michael E. Mann sued National Review for defamation after columnist Mark Steyn accused Mann of fraud and referenced a quote from Competitive Enterprise Institute (CEI) writer Rand Simberg that called Mann "the Jerry Sandusky of climate science, except that instead of molesting children, he has molested and tortured data." Civil liberties organizations such as the ACLU and the Electronic Frontier Foundation and several publications such as The Washington Post expressed support for National Review in the lawsuit, filing amicus briefs in their defense. In February 2024, Mann was awarded over $1 million from Steyn and Simberg. He intends to appeal a 2021 ruling saying that the CEI and National Review could not be held liable.

=== Barack Obama ===
In June 2008, National Review correspondent Jim Geraghty published an article encouraging Barack Obama to release his birth certificate in order to debunk false rumors circulating on conservative forums and blogs. Geraghty's column may have brought these conspiracy theories about Obama to mainstream attention. Karen Tumulty wrote in Time that Geraghty's article "became fodder for cable television." Obama released his birth certificate a few days after Geraghty's column, and Geraghty wrote that there was "no reason" to doubt its authenticity. In a July 2009 column, the National Review editorial board called conspiracies about Obama's citizenship "untrue."

One National Review article suggested Obama's parents could be communists because "for a white woman to marry a black man in 1958, or '60, there was almost inevitably a connection to explicit Communist politics".

=== Ann Coulter 9/11 column ===
Two days after the September 11 attacks, National Review published a column by Ann Coulter in which she wrote of Muslims, "This is no time to be precious about locating the exact individuals directly involved in this particular terrorist attack. We should invade their countries, kill their leaders and convert them to Christianity. We weren't punctilious about locating and punishing only Hitler and his top officers. We carpet-bombed German cities; we killed civilians. That's war. And this is war." National Review later called the column a "mistake" and fired Coulter as a contributing editor.

=== Jeffrey Epstein ===
In 2019, The New York Times reported that National Review was one of three news outlets (along with Forbes and HuffPost) that had published stories written by Jeffrey Epstein's publicists. The National Review article was written by Christina Galbraith, Epstein's publicist at the time the article was published in 2013. The National Review bio for Galbraith described her as a science writer. National Review retracted the article in July 2019 with apologies and spoke of new methods being used to better filter freelance content.

=== Rashida Tlaib ===
After the 2024 Lebanon pager explosions, National Review published a cartoon of U.S. Representative Rashida Tlaib with an exploding pager. It was condemned by Tlaib as racist and Islamophobic. Dearborn mayor Abdullah Hammoud called the cartoon "anti-Arab bigotry," but the Wyman Institute came to National Review's defense. Cartoonist and Detroit News columnist Henry Payne responded, "Metro Detroit has an unfortunate history of intolerant leadership from Orville Hubbard to Rashida Tlaib. And cartoonists' pens have long lampooned their demagoguery."

== See also ==
- List of Republicans who opposed the Donald Trump 2024 presidential campaign

== Bibliography ==
- Bogus, Carl T. (2011). Buckley: William F. Buckley Jr. and the Rise of American Conservatism. New York: Bloomsbury. ISBN 978-1596915800. OCLC 707329314.
- Frohnen, Bruce; Beer, Jeremy; Nelson, Jeffrey O., eds. (2006). American Conservatism: An Encyclopedia. Wilmington, DE: ISI Books. ISBN 1-932236-44-9. OCLC 64690866.
- Judis, John B. (1988). William F. Buckley, Jr.: Patron Saint of the Conservatives. New York: Simon and Schuster. ISBN 978-0-7432-1797-2.
- Nash, George (2006) [1978]. The Conservative Intellectual Movement in America Since 1945 (30th anniversary ed.). Wilmington, DE: ISI Books. ISBN 1933859121. OCLC 124536175.
- Smant, Kevin J. (2002). Principles and Heresies: Frank S. Meyer and the Shaping of the American Conservative Movement. Wilmington, DE: ISI Books. ISBN 1882926722. OCLC 50036266.
