= Frederick Wilhelmsen =

American philosopher (1923–1996)

- Born: May 18, 1923
- Died: May 21, 1996 (aged 73)

Academic background
- Education: Complutense University of Madrid

Frederick D. "Fritz" Wilhelmsen (18 May 1923 — 21 May 1996) was an American Catholic philosopher known for his explication and advancement of the Thomistic tradition. He also was a political commentator, assessing American politics and society from a traditionalist perspective, and a political thinker, addressing what he perceived to be the failings of secular liberal democracy. He principally was a professor at the University of Dallas from 1965 to his death in 1996. He also taught at the University of Santa Clara, the Al-Hikma University in Baghdad, the University of Navarra in Pamplona, Spain, and lectured and taught classes at many other universities. His Spanish students called him "Don Federico" while his American students called him "Fritz."

== Life ==
Wilhelmsen grew up in Detroit and began his higher education at the University of Detroit. His time there was interrupted by World War II and he served as an army medic for three years. He went on to earn his BA from the University of San Francisco in 1947, followed by his MA in Philosophy in 1948 at the University of Notre Dame. He completed his PhD in Philosophy at the University of Madrid in 1958.

He was awarded a Guggenheim fellowship in Philosophy in 1956.

He was a prolific writer. He contributed articles to the following: America, The Angelus, The Commonweal, Faith & Reason, The Grail, The Intercollegiate Review, Modern Age, National Review, The Political Science Reviewer, Triumph, The University Bookman, and The Wanderer, among others.

He also was a founding editor of Triumph, a Roman Catholic monthly that sought the sacralization of American society and organized the first anti-abortion rally in the United States.

In addition to assessing American politics and society, he was inspired by and extensively reflected upon Spanish politics and society. Alvaro d'Ors, a notable Spanish political philosopher, wrote that Wilhelmsen, an American from Detroit, was "the best interpreter of Spanish traditionalism, a body of political thought also known as Carlism, after King Charles V (Don Carlos)".

Wilhelmsen enjoyed a lively friendship and correspondence with Marshall McLuhan, who spent time at the University of Dallas in the 1970s.

In 1993, he was honored with a Festschrift entitled Saints, Sovereigns, and Scholars: Studies in Honor of Frederick D. Wilhelmsen.

Wilhelmsen was reportedly uneasy about the reforms of the Second Vatican Council, but accepted them and continued to support the Church.

From 1977 until his death, he taught at Christendom College, Front Royal, Virginia. He died on 21 May 1996 due to heart failure, after receiving the last sacraments.

== Books ==
=== Author ===
- Hilaire Belloc: No Alienated Man. A Study in Christian Integration. New York: Sheed and Ward, Inc., 1953.
- Man's Knowledge of Reality: An Introduction to Thomistic Epistemology. Engelwood Cliffs, NJ: Prentice-Hall, 1956.
- Omega: Last of the Barques. Westminster, MD: The Newman Press, 1956.
- The Metaphysics of Love. New York: Sheed and Ward, 1962.
- El problema de la trascendencia en la metafísica actual. Madrid: Ediciones Rialp, S.A. and Publicaciones de la Facultad de Filosofía y Letras de la Universidad de Navarra, 1963.
- El problema de Occidente y los cristianos. Seville, Spain: Publicaciones de la Delegación Nacional del Requeté, 1964.
- La ortodoxia pública y los poderes de la irracionalidad. Madrid-Mexico City: Ediciones Rialp, S.A., Colección O Crece o Muere, 1965.
- The Paradoxical Structure of Existence. Irving, TX: The University of Dallas Press, 1970.
- Así pensamos. "Published under the pseudonym "Un Requeté") Madrid: Editorial Tradicionalista, 1977.
- Christianity and Political Philosophy. Athens, GA: University of Georgia Press, 1978.
- Citizen of Rome: Reflections from the Life of a Roman Catholic. LaSalle, IL: Sherwood Sugden & Company, Publishers, 1980.
- Persona y sociedad, ed., Nilda E. Bonansea. San Luis, Argentina: Universidad Nacional de San Luís, 1984.
- Being and Knowing: Reflections of a Thomist. Albany, NY: Preserving Christian Publications, 1991.
- Under Full Sail: Reflections and Tales. Frasier, MI: Alcuin Press, 1996.
- Los saberes políticos (ciencia, filosofía y teología políticas). Presentation by Miguel Ayuso. Barcelona: Ediciones Scire, SL, 2006.

=== Coauthor ===
- (with Jane Bret) The War in Man: Media and Machines. Athens, GA: University of Georgia Press, 1970.
- (with Jane Bret) Telepolitics: The Politics of Neuronic Man. Montreal and New York: Tundra Books, 1972.

=== Editor ===
- Guardini, Romano. The End of the Modern World: A Search for Orientation. Trans. J. Theman and H. Burke. New York: Sheed and War, 1956.
- Seeds of Anarchy: A Study of Campus Revolution. Dallas: Argus Press, 1969.

== Bibliography ==
- Allitt, Patrick. Catholic Intellectuals and Conservative Politics in America, 1950-1985. Ithaca, NY: Cornell University Press, 1993.
- Ayuso, Miguel. "Frederick D. Wilhelmsen y España". Foreword to R.A. Herrera, James Lehrberger, O.Cist., and M.E. Bradford, eds. Saints, Sovereigns, and Scholars: Studies in Honor of Frederick D. Wilhelmsen. New York: Peter Lang Publishing, Inc., 1993.
- Ewbank, Michael B. "The Difference Diversity Makes". In R.A. Herrera, James Lehrberger, O.Cist., and M.E. Bradford, eds. Saints, Sovereigns, and Scholars: Studies in Honor of Frederick D. Wilhelmsen. New York: Peter Lang Publishing, Inc., 1993.
- Henry, Michael. Introduction to "Christianity and Political Philosophy," by Frederick D. Wilhelmsen. New Brunswick, N.J.: Transaction Publishers, 2014.
- Herrera, R.A., James Lehrberger, O.Cist, and M.E. Bradford, eds., Saints, Sovereigns, and Scholars: Studies in Honor of Frederick D. Wilhelmsen. New York: Peter Lang Publishing, Inc., 1993.
- Lee, Patrick. Introduction to "The Metaphysics of Love," by Frederick D. Wilhelmsen. New Brunswick, N.J.: Transaction Publishers, 2015.
- Lehrberger, O. Cist. James J. "Christendom’s Troubador: Frederick D. Wilhelmsen". The Intercollegiate Review (Spring, 1997): 52-55.
- Lehrberger, O. Cist. James J. Introduction to "The Paradoxical Structure of Existence," by Frederick D. Wilhelmsen. New Brunswick, N.J.: Transaction Publishers, 2015.
- Kirk, Russell. "An Adventurer-Professor". In Confessions of a Bohemian Tory. New York: Fleet Publishing Co., 1963.
- Marshner, William. Introduction to "Being and Knowing: Reflections of a Thomist," by Frederick D. Wilhelmsen. New Brunswick, N.J.: Transaction Publishers, 2015.
- Nash, George H. The Conservative Intellectual Movement in America. New York: Basic Books, 1976.
- Nelson, Jeffrey O. "Wilhelmsen, Frederick D". In American Conservatism: An Encyclopedia, eds., Bruce Frohnen, Jeremy Beer, and Jeffrey O. Nelson, 921-923. Wilmington, DE: ISI Books, 2006.
- Popowski, Mark D. "The Political Thought of Frederick D. Wilhelmsen." "The Catholic Social Science Review" 20 (2015): 21-38.
- Popowski, Mark D. The Rise and Fall of Triumph: The History of a Radical Roman Catholic Magazine, 1966-1976. Lanham, MD: Lexington Books, 2011.
- Santa Cruz, Manuel de Alberto Ruiz de Galarreta. Apuntes y documentos para la historia del Tradicionalismo español, 1939-1966. Madrid, 29 volumes, 1979-1991, volumes 22-II, 23, 25-I and II, 26 and 27.
- Schaefer, Thomas. "Up from Alienation: The Wilhelmsian Vision of the Human Person". In R.A. Herrera, James Lehrberger, O.Cist., and M.E. Bradford, eds. Saints, Sovereigns, and Scholars: Studies in Honor of Frederick D. Wilhelmsen. New York: Peter Lang Publishing, Inc., 1993.
- Schiller, Craig. The Guilty Conscience of a Conservative. New Rochelle, NY: Arlington House Publishers, 1978.
- Unsigned. Frederick Daniel Wilhelmsen (Eminent Professor and Catholic Intellectual): A Tribute from the University of Dallas. Irving, TX: University of Dallas, 1998.
