= Peter Lawler (academic) =

American political consultant (1951–2017)

- Born: Peter Augustine Lawler; July 30, 1951; Alexandria, Virginia, U.S.
- Died: May 23, 2017 (aged 65)
- Occupations: Political scientist; philosopher
- Spouse: Rita
- Children: 1

Academic background
- Education: Allentown College (BA); University of Virginia (PhD)

Peter Augustine Lawler (July 30, 1951 – May 23, 2017) was an American academic who was Dana Professor of Government at Berry College. He taught courses in political philosophy and American politics.

He was executive editor of the quarterly journal Perspectives on Political Science and was a chairman of the politics and literature section of the American Political Science Association. He also served on the editorial board of the new bilingual critical edition of Alexis de Tocqueville's Democracy in America. Lawler also served on the editorial boards of several journals.

Upon his death, The Week penned an obituary entitled "Why every smart liberal should read conservative philosopher Peter Lawler," recommending that, "at a time when the post-Goldwater conservative movement finds itself increasingly eclipsed by right-wing populism, Lawler's distinctive vision and voice may be more pertinent than ever."

== Career ==
Lawler attended Allentown College in Center Valley, Pennsylvania and earned a PhD from the University of Virginia. He wrote or edited 15 books. His Modern and American Dignity was the reason he was chosen the 2010 Georgia Author of the Year. His books--Postmodernism Rightly Understood, Aliens in America, Stuck with Virtue, and Homeless and at Home in America—have been widely and positively reviewed. His American Political Rhetoric (edited with Robert Schaefer, seventh edition) is used in introductory American government courses at a sizeable number of colleges and universities. He was the 2007 winner of the Weaver Prize for Scholarly Excellence in promoting human dignity to a broad audience.

Lawler has spoken at roughly a hundred American colleges and universities and published well over two hundred articles, chapters, and reviews in a wide variety of venues. Over the last year alone, he gave nearly 30 lectures at various institutions and conferences. He was the 2015 Ross Lence Master Teacher at Residence at the Honors College at the University of Houston.

Lawler wrote broadly from a Catholic intellectual tradition that emphasizes the importance of limits on unfettered personal autonomy in shaping well-lived lives, as well as the centrality of the love of truth in making sense of the human experience and knowing "who we are and what we are supposed to do." Lawler argued that moral anthropology suggests the possibility of God's existence and love. His influences include both Catholics such as Augustine, Pierre Manent, Thomas Aquinas, Pascal, Flannery O'Connor, Tocqueville and Walker Percy, as well as non-Catholic thinkers (especially Leo Strauss).

In 2004, Lawler was appointed to President Bush's Council on Bioethics. He served until the council was terminated by President Obama in 2009.

In 2010, Lawler (with Marc Guerra of Assumption College) received a major grant from the Science of Virtues project at the University of Chicago for a series of path-breaking conferences at Berry College on the theme of "Stuck with Virtue". This conferences has generated several important publications, including A Political Companion to Walker Percy (edited with Brian Smith) and Descartes, Locke, Darwin, and the Science of Modern Virtue.

Lawler also became a popular and influential blogger, at both "Rightly Understood" at Big Think and "Postmodern Conservative," originally at First Things and then at National Review Online. His posts and short essays are often and widely reprinted. The first volume of his short essays—Allergic to Crazy—has been published by St. Augustine's Press. His American Heresies and Higher Education is forthcoming in 2016.

== Personal life ==
Lawler was born in Alexandria, Virginia, on July 30, 1951, the son of Patricia Ann Fullerton Lawler and Thomas Comerford Lawler, the nephew of Ronald David Lawler, OFMCap, and the brother of Thomas Aquin "Quin" Lawler and Gregory Francis Lawler.

His father worked for the Central Intelligence Agency from 1951 to 1977, and also worked in patristics, serving as a co-editor, from 1964 to 1991, of the Ancient Christian Writers series published first by Newman Press, and then by Paulist Press. He likewise translated Saint Augustine: Sermons for Christmas and Epiphany, and The Letters of Saint Jerome for that series. With his brother, Father Roland, and the future cardinal, Donald Wuerl, he wrote an adult catechism, The Teaching of Christ.

Lawler died on May 23, 2017, aged 65, and was survived by his brothers, his wife, Rita Lawler, his daughter, Catherine Lawler Jackson, and his grandchildren, Henry Augustus Jackson and Molly Jackson.

== Publications ==
- Lawler, Peter Augustine (2002). "Aliens in America: The Strange Truth about Our Souls." ISI Books. ISBN 1-882926-71-4
- Lawler, Peter Augustine (1999). "Postmodernism Rightly Understood" Rowman & Littlefield. ISBN 0-8476-9426-7
- Lawler, Peter Augustine & Robert Schaefer (editors) (2000). "American Political Rhetoric" (4th ed) Rowman & Littlefield. ISBN 0-7425-1173-1
- Lawler, Peter Augustine (2005). "Stuck with Virtue: The American Individual and Our Biotechnological Future." ISI Books. ISBN 978-1-932236-84-2
- Lawler, Peter Augustine (2007). "Homeless and At Home in America." St. Augustine's Press. ISBN 978-1-58731-360-8
- Lawler, Peter Augustine (2010). "Modern and American Dignity." ISI Books. ISBN 978-1-935191-89-6
