= Thomas Molnar =

Hungarian academic (1921–2010)

Thomas Steven Molnar (/ˈmjɔːlnɑːr/; Hungarian: Molnár Tamás; 26 July 1921, in Budapest, Hungary – 20 July 2010, in Richmond, Virginia) was a Catholic philosopher, historian and political theorist.

== Life ==
Molnar completed his undergraduate studies at the University of Brussels in Belgium and received his Ph.D. in philosophy and history from Columbia University in New York City.

He was visiting professor of philosophy of religion at the University of Budapest. As author of over forty books in French and English he published on a variety of subjects including religion, politics, and education. He emigrated to the United States, where he taught for many years at Brooklyn College. Molnar said he was inspired by Russell Kirk's work The Conservative Mind. Like Kirk, he wrote a good deal for the magazine National Review. In addition, Kirk and Molnar were founding board members of Una Voce America.

Molnar admired Charles Maurras and wrote that French failure to honor Maurras' conservative values was a component of the "agony of France".

Molnar was married to Ildiko and had one son, Eric. He died at the age of 89 on Tuesday 20 July 2010.

Among the awards Molnar received was the Széchenyi Prize, from the President of the Republic of Hungary.

== Works ==
- (1960). Bernanos: His Political Thought and Prophecy.
- (1961). The Decline of the Intellectual.
- (1961). The Future of Education. Foreword by Russell Kirk.
- (1962). The Two Faces of American Foreign Policy.
- (1965). Africa; A Political Travelogue.
- (1966). L'Afrique du sud.
- (1966). South West Africa; the Last Pioneer Country.
- (1966). Spotlight on South West Africa.
- (1967). Utopia, the Perennial Heresy.
- (1968). Ecumenism or New Reformation?.
- (1968). Sartre: Ideologue of Our Time.
- (1969). The Counter-revolution.
- (1970). La Gauche vue d'en face.
- (1971). The American Dilemma: A Consideration of United States Leadership in World.
- (1971). Nationalism in the Space Age.
- (1973). God and the Knowledge of Reality.
- (1974). L'Animal politique: Essai.
- (1976). Authority and Its Enemies.
- (1976). Le Socialisme sans visage: l'avènement du tiers modèle.
- (1977). Dialogues and Ideologues.
- (1978). Christian Humanism: a Critique of the Secular City and Its Ideology.
- (1978). Le Modèle défiguré: l'Amèrique de Tocqueville á Carter.
- (1980). Politics and the State: the Catholic View.
- (1980). Theists and Atheists: A Typology of Non-belief.
- (1982). Le Dieu immanent: la grande tentation de la pensée allemande.
- (1982). Tiers-Monde: Idéologie, Réalité.
- (1986). L'Éclipse du sacré: discours et réponses [with Alain de Benoist].
- (1987). The Pagan Temptation.
- (1988). Twin Powers: Politics and the Sacred.
- (1990). The Church, Pilgrim of Centuries.
- (1990). L'Europe entre parenthèses.
- (1991). Philosophical Grounds.
- (1994). The Emerging Atlantic Culture.
- (1996). Archetypes of Thought.
- (1996). Filozófusok Istene.
- (1996). Return to Philosophy.
- (1999). A Magyar Szent Korona és a szentkorona-tan az ezredfordulón (edited by Tóth Zoltán József).
- (1999). Századvégi Mérleg: Válogatott írások.
- (2000). A Pogány Kísértés.
- (2000). Igazság és Történelem.
- (2002). Bennünk lakik-e az Isten?.
- (2002). Válogatás a Magyar Nemzet nek és az asztalfióknak írt publicisztikákból.
- (2003). A Beszélő Isten.
- (2004). A jobb és a bal: tanulmányok.
