= Good Epidemiological Practices =

Set of guidelines proposed in the early 1990s

Good Epidemiological Practices or Good Epidemiology Practices (GEP) was a set of guidelines produced by the U.S. Chemical Manufacturers Association (CMA) in 1991 to improve epidemiologic research practices. It was then adopted by the tobacco industry around 1993 as part of its "sound science" program to counter criticisms of the industry on health and environmental issues such as secondhand smoke. It failed to make much impact on the US and European regulators, but may have had more influence in its later manifestations in Asia and particularly China.

The complexities of creating Good Epidemiological Practices developments have been examined by University of San Francisco researchers Stanton Glantz and Elisa K. Ong in papers such as "Tobacco Industry Efforts to Subvert the IARC's Second hand smoke study" published in The Lancet. They argued that these were industry programs designed to manipulate the scientific standards of proof, and an attempt to set risk-evaluation standards that could be forced through by legislation, and imposed on the agencies (EPA, OSHA, etc.) to hamstring the agencies' ability to regulate.

== Tobacco's GEP ==
In February 1993, an executive of Philip Morris USA, Ellen Merlo, wrote a memo to her CEO William Campbell outlining their strategies to discredit the 1992 report by the US Environmental Protection Agency (EPA) that identified secondhand smoke as a Group A human carcinogen, and to counter what she described as "junk science". Their public relations firm, APCO Associates, launched a "sound science" coalition in the United States, and The Advancement of Sound Science Coalition (TASSC) was formed three months later in May 1993, with Garrey Carruthers the chairman. George L. Carlo, a science entrepreneur who worked with Federal Focus Inc., prepared one of the early draft documents.

At this time the legislative and public activist attacks on the tobacco industry had escalated, and they blamed this on the "twisted science" used by the EPA. In Europe the UN's International Agency for Research on Cancer (IARC) was about to release a similar report, which the tobacco industry also needed to counter.

Helmut Reif, Tom Borelli and Mitch Ritter at Philip Morris's Science & Technology division thought the CMA's GEP could be improved to help PM develop standards for secondhand smoke epidemiological studies. This initiative to "constructively improve" epidemiology would enlist the assistance of the industry's consultants, and they could then run an "offensive strategy"—essentially another proactive effort by the industry to shape the scientific process.

Joanna Sullivan, Philip Morris's main PR in Europe, advised her American superiors (June 1994) on how GEP might be used to combat the IARC's report, since this would give United Nations weight to the claim that second-hand smoke was potentially cancerous to non-smokers. By establishing the standards of epidemiology and by using their influence in Congress to have GEP mandated by legislation, they hoped to design a set of established procedural standards for epidemiology.

The innovation here, was that they aimed to attack the techniques relied on by the EPA and IARC scientists. In the past, they had focussed attacks on specific adverse scientific findings and reports. GEP was designed to directed an attack on the techniques of epidemiology itself.

They may have had little hope that this would be widely accepted by the majority of epidemiologists or by the regulators, but it made possible a vigorous public relations campaign in the media to challenge and denigrate any adverse findings.

=== Panels and Conferences ===
Initially Philip Morris utilised a small panel of trusted epidemiologists who regularly serviced the industry when it needed to defend against some adverse finding. They were requested to improve on the Chemical Manufacturer's Association's GEP. Later they extended this mandate by conducting seminars on GEP and good risk-assessment practice around the world. The tobacco industry itself needed to remain invisible and so they needed the front provided by third-party think-tanks and old allies.

The main organisation hired to run the GEP program was Federal Focus Inc., a PR company set up during the second term of the Reagan Administration by two top Agency officials, Thorne Auchter, who had been the Director of the OSHA (Occupational Safety & Health Administration) and James J. Tozzi who had been Reagan's "Deregulation Czar" as head of the OIRA (Office of Information and Regulatory Affairs), at the OMB (Office of Management & Budget). These two and the head of the EPA (Anne Gorsuch Burford) were among the 20 or so top Agency executives forced (or encouraged) to resign over Reagan's regulatory scandals.

Jim Tozzi's technique at the OIRA was to block regulators from regulating by denying their agencies funding unless they cancelled one regulation before adding another. (Tozzi and Auchter also ran Multinational Business Services, and the Institute for Regulatory Policy).

The main tobacco law firm, Covington & Burling (C&B) was also involved both in promoting the idea and in recruiting scientists willing to participate, usually only when assured that payment would be laundered through the law firm. C&B lawyer John Rupp initiated similar activities in Italy and Germany. The total expenses for this program in 1997 were about $300,000.

The GEP program "experts" that Auchter and Tozzi enlisted were pre-screened by Philip Morris Issues Managers and Federal Focus, and the results they produced were pre-tested at a number of conferences (which often didn't carry the GEP name). The first, known as the Lansdowne Conference, was held at a US conference center with only a few of their most trusted scientist helpers. They then widened the advisory pool and held a London Conference where Philip Morris opened the operation to British-American Tobacco and the other companies. They established what became known as the London Principles. A German conference soon followed.

Generally GEP failed to influence policy makers in America and Europe, so it was tried in Asia through conferences of the Asian WhiteCoats group (collectively known as 'ARTIST') and with other recruits in Kuala Lumpur, Hong-Kong, Yokohama, Beijing, and then Guangzhou.

=== The inadvertent whistleblower ===
Ted Sanders, who ran the Scientific Affairs operations for Philip Morris in Europe, provides us with an excellent overview of how the Philip Morris GEP unravelled in a long letter of complaint to Cathy Ellis, his executive overseer in Brussels (Apr 3 1998).
