= Victor H. Schiro =

American politician

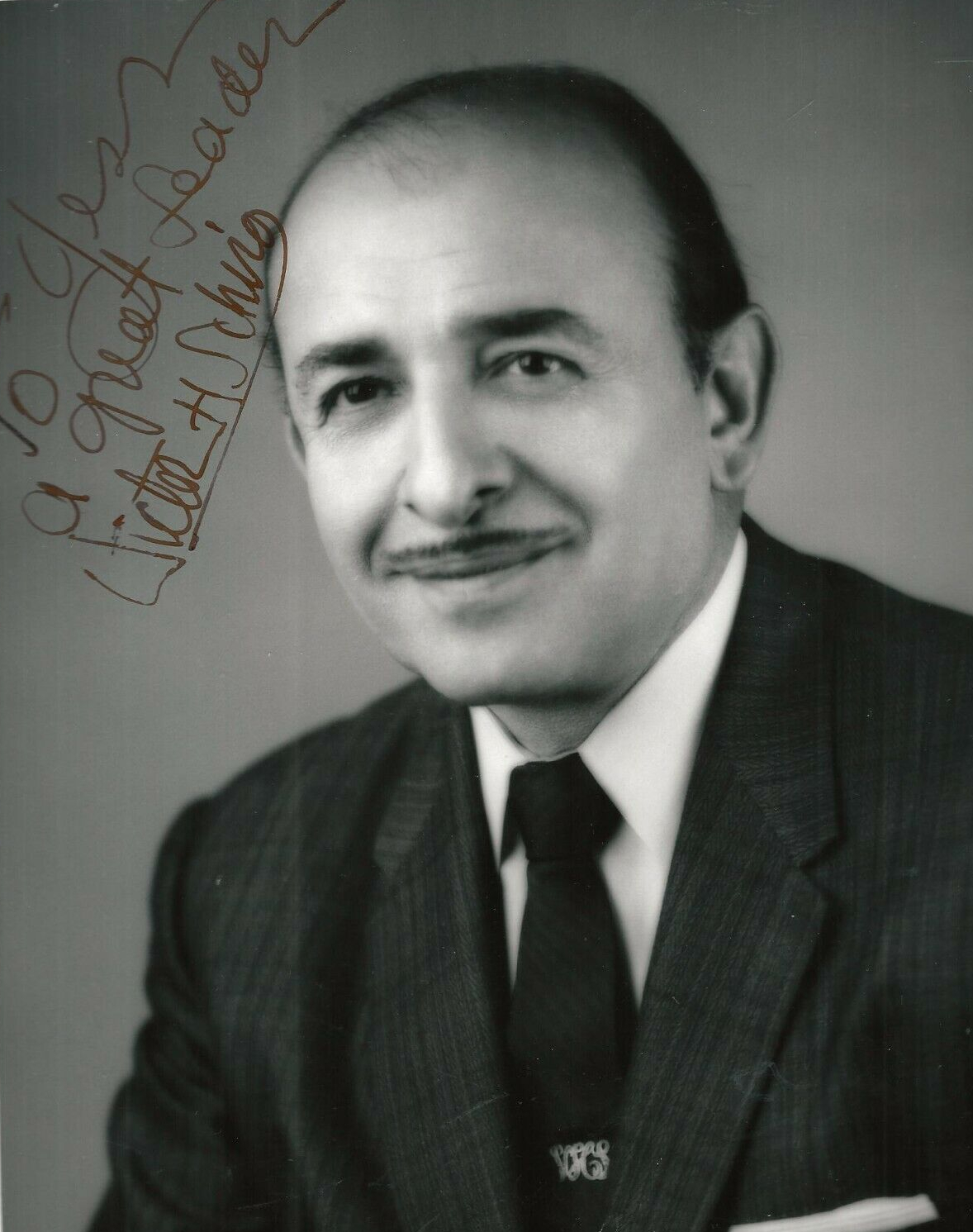

55th Mayor of New Orleans
- In office July 17, 1961 – May 2, 1970
- Preceded by: DeLesseps Story Morrison
- Succeeded by: Moon Landrieu

Personal details
- Born: Victor Hugo Schiro; May 6, 1904 Chicago, Illinois, US
- Died: August 29, 1992 (aged 88) New Orleans, Louisiana, US
- Party: Democratic
- Spouse: Mary Margaret "Sunny" Gibbes
- Profession: Insurance

Military service
- Allegiance: United States
- Branch/service: United States Coast Guard
- Battles/wars: World War II

Victor Hugo "Vic" Schiro (May 6, 1904 – August 29, 1992) was an American politician who served on the New Orleans City Council and as Mayor from 1961 to 1970.

== Early life and political career ==
Schiro was born in Chicago, Illinois, the son of Andrew Edward and Mary (Pizzati) Schiro, immigrants of Italian, specifically Sicilian, & Arbëreshë origin. After moving to New Orleans with his parents as a child, Schiro spent his young adulthood in Honduras and California, where he worked as a movie extra, and co-managed a Nevada gold mine before returning to New Orleans. He worked briefly as an assistant cameraman for Frank Capra. Having returned to New Orleans in 1928, Schiro became a radio announcer. In 1932, Schiro married Mary Margaret Gibbes, better known as Sunny Schiro.

Schiro founded his own insurance company and became an active civic leader in the 1940s; he was president of the Young Men's Business Club. In 1950, he was elected commissioner of public buildings and parks. A fellow commissioner over public utilities was A. Brown Moore, a decorated World War II veteran who later ran unsuccessfully for lieutenant governor in 1956 on the intraparty ticket of Fred Preaus.

Under the new mayor-council charter of 1954, Schiro was elected councilman-at-large. When deLesseps Story Morrison resigned his position as mayor in 1961 to become United States Ambassador to the Organization of American States, the city council elected Schiro, then the at-large councilman, as the interim mayor. Theodore M. Hickey became the interim at-large council member but returned to the Louisiana State Senate in 1963, where he remained until 1984.

Schiro was subsequently elected to two full terms as mayor in 1962 and 1965. Schiro inherited Morrison's Crescent City Democratic Association, formed as a rival to the Regular Democratic Organization, but the political machine was deeply divided by the 1962 election, and it declined thereafter.

== Schiro as mayor ==
Schiro acquired a reputation for calm, quiet leadership during the turbulent 1960s. However, like his predecessor Chep Morrison, Schiro was an avowed segregationist. He defeated racial moderate Adrian G. Duplantier, who had Morrison's support, and several other opponents in the mayoral primary election of 1962 by stressing his segregationist credentials and tying his opponents to civil rights causes. A survey of seven selected black precincts showed that Schiro received only 3.3 percent of the African American vote in the runoff with Duplantier. Schiro then defeated the Republican candidate, Elliot Ross Buckley, a cousin of newspaper columnist and magazine publisher William F. Buckley Jr., of New York City.

While personally opposed to integration, Schiro was a pragmatist and soon concluded that segregation could not be maintained forever. Business leaders prompted Schiro to deal with integration more effectively than Morrison had in order to preserve the city's reputation and business climate. In contrast to the 1960-61 School Year, the opening of integrated schools in the fall of 1961 was peaceful, as Schiro used the New Orleans Police Department and U.S. Marshals to prevent disturbances. Schiro later dragged his feet on issues such as the appointment of a biracial committee and the hiring of black city employees. Schiro was noted for his "open door" policy in City Hall, allowing almost anyone (including civil rights leaders) to speak to the mayor. He closed public swimming pools rather than desegregate them and had the Reverend A. L. Davis arrested when the civil rights leader attempted to meet with Schiro in the mayor's office. In spite of this, Davis endorsed Schiro during Schiro's campaign for reelection.

Schiro held to a simple governing philosophy, stating that "if it’s good for New Orleans, I’m for it." He expanded the existing criminal justice campus, located at the intersection of Tulane Avenue and Broad Street in Mid-City, by building a new police and municipal courts complex. His administration presided over rapid suburban-style growth in the newly developing Algiers and New Orleans East districts, and constructed new roads, regional libraries and police and fire stations to accommodate this expansion. Schiro also initiated a code of ethics for city employees. Devoting attention to urban planning, Schiro helped sponsor the creation of the New Orleans Regional Planning Commission to devise programming for the effective disbursement of federal assistance, got New Orleans included in Lyndon Johnson’s Model Cities Program, and established NORA, the New Orleans Redevelopment Authority. His widening of the downtown Poydras Street corridor allowed for substantial new development in the area in the following decades. Schiro's first year as mayor also coincided with the reopening of the World War II-era Michoud Assembly Facility in New Orleans East to assemble the first stages of the Saturn V and Saturn IB rockets. Boeing and other NASA contractors hired thousands of highly paid, highly skilled workers, briefly helping New Orleans achieve the rates of job growth by then occurring in other, more rapidly expanding Sun Belt cities. With the steep decline in NASA funding following the early Apollo landings, however, most of these jobs were lost.

Schiro was briefly considered a gubernatorial candidate in 1963 for the 1964 Louisiana gubernatorial election. On St. Patrick's Day, 1963, he spoke at a reception in Donaldsonville to a primarily rural audience. Schiro presented an ambitious reform agenda of 13 proposals. Afterwards, a poll of the audience indicated overwhelming support for Schiro at the expense of the established candidates for governor. Schiro again repeated his message while speaking at the Louisiana Municipal Association in Lafayette on March 29, 1963. Others who spoke there were Chep Morrison, John McKeithen, Gillis Long, and Speedy Long, all of whom were considered potential gubernatorial candidates. The mayor's public appearances were considered by many to be the opening of a "Draft Schiro" campaign, however Schiro denied that he had intentions to run for state office. Schiro eventually endorsed Gillis Long for Governor. When Long failed to make the primary runoff, Schiro threw his support behind Morrison and attempted to assist the former mayor in any way possible.

Schiro was mayor during Hurricane Betsy, which flooded the Lower Ninth Ward and much of New Orleans East in 1965. He was known for his famous statement to the media at the time: "Don't believe any false rumors, unless you hear them from me." He convinced President Johnson to visit the city on the day after the hurricane; Johnson and Schiro visited the Lower Ninth Ward and an emergency shelter. Schiro later travelled to Washington, D.C., to lend his support to obtaining congressional legislation that would give storm victims a $5,000 loan forgiveness package. The hurricane hit in the middle of Schiro's 1965 re-election campaign; though the Times Picayune and others accused Schiro of attempting to politicize the disaster, Schiro narrowly won re-election against his main opponent, Councilman Jimmy Fitzmorris. Schiro's share of the black vote jumped to 40 percent, while his share of the white vote declined. Also in the running was perennial mayoral candidate Addison Roswell Thompson, a taxicab operator and a member of the Ku Klux Klan. Fitzmorris also finished second in the Democratic primary in the next mayoral election, but won election to two terms as lieutenant governor in 1971 and 1975 before falling just short of the general election in the 1979 gubernatorial election.

Mayor Schiro considered the arrival of the New Orleans Saints professional football team and the beginning of plans to build the Louisiana Superdome to be two of the foremost achievements of his administration. The vigorous promotion by local businessman Dave Dixon, and the support of Governor John McKeithen, also assisted Schiro in his quest for the Superdome. Schiro was additionally helped with the acquisition of the Saints by the powerful Louisiana congressional delegation of Senate Majority Whip Russell Long and House Majority Whip Hale Boggs.

Also during his administration, formal government-sponsored studies were undertaken to evaluate the feasibility of relocating New Orleans' international airport to a new site, contemporaneous with similar efforts that were ultimately successful in Houston (George Bush Intercontinental Airport) and Dallas (Dallas/Fort Worth International Airport). This attempt got as far as recommending a site in New Orleans East; a man-made island was to be created south of I-10 and north of U.S. Route 90 in a bay of Lake Pontchartrain. However, by the early 1970s it had been decided to expand the current airport instead of constructing a replacement.

Schiro was ineligible for re-election to a third term in the election of 1969-70, due to a clause in the city charter which had been adopted by voters in 1954 limiting mayors to two consecutive elected terms. He was succeeded by Moon Landrieu, who was elected with the support of the city's black community. One of Schiro's final acts in office was to reinstall the Battle of Liberty Place Monument, which honored a failed coup by the paramilitary White League of the sitting Republican governor, William Pitt Kellogg, who supported voting rights for Blacks. The inscription on the monument, which Schiro erected at the foot of Canal Street, celebrated the return of "white supremacy in the South." Schiro had left the monument, which had been removed for construction, in storage for the entirety of his two terms until then; some viewed Schiro's decision as a symbolic reassertion of white authority at a time of growing Black political power.

== After City Hall ==
After his two terms as mayor, Schiro returned to selling insurance at his Victor Schiro Insurance Agency. After a campaign for the position of state insurance commissioner in 1975 when he polled 16 percent of the vote against the incumbent Democrat Sherman A. Bernard, Schiro continued selling insurance until he suffered a stroke in 1988.

In 2001, Schiro was posthumously inducted into the Louisiana Political Museum and Hall of Fame in Winnfield.

== See also ==
- Timeline of New Orleans, 1960s-1970s

== Sources and external links ==
- Victor H. Schiro collection at Tulane University
- Biographical Dictionary of American Mayors, 1820-1980. Greenwood Press, 1981.
- Fairclough, Adam. Race and Democracy: The Civil Rights Struggle in Louisiana, 1915-1972. University of Georgia, 1995.
- Haas, Edward F. "Victor H. Schiro, Hurricane Betsy, and the 'Forgiveness Bill.'" Gulf Coast Historical Review, Fall 1990.
- Hirsch, Arnold and Joseph Logsdon. Creole New Orleans: Race and Americanization. LSU Press, 1992.
- Parker, Joseph B. The Morrison Era: Reform Politics in New Orleans. Pelican, 1974.
- Pope, John. "Former Mayor Victor H. Schiro is dead at 88." New Orleans Times-Picayune, August 30, 1992.

Political offices
| Preceded by New position under municipal charter | At-large member of the New Orleans City Council; 1954–1961 | Succeeded by Theodore M. Hickey (interim) |
| Preceded by DeLesseps Story Morrison | Mayor of New Orleans; 1961–1969 | Succeeded by Moon Landrieu |
