= GEP =

GEP may refer to:

- Gene expression programming
- Generation expansion planning, in power engineering
- Giant Electric Pea, a British music label
- Gifted Education Programme (Singapore)
- Global Environmental Politics, a scholarly journal
- Good engineering practice
- Good Epidemiological Practices
- Gross Ecosystem Product
- Growth elasticity of poverty
