= Robert Rowland =

Robert Rowland may refer to:

- Robert Rowland (politician) (1966–2021), British politician
- Robert A. Rowland (1932–2001), American lawyer and government official
- Robert C. Rowland, American argumentation and rhetorical scholar
- Robert R. Rowland (1917–2003), United States Air Force general
