= Center for Regulatory Effectiveness =

American think tank

The Center for Regulatory Effectiveness (CRE) is an industry-funded, for-profit think tank. It focuses on federal agency compliance with "good government" laws which regulate the regulators. These "good government" laws include the Data Quality Act, the Paperwork Reduction Act, Executive Orders on regulatory review, the Unfunded Mandates Act, the Regulatory Flexibility Act and the Congressional Review Act.

CRE was formed by former career officials of the White House Office of Management and Budget. The head of the firm is Jim Tozzi.

It has been criticised as a front organisation for industries which seek to undermine the regulatory process, notably by Chris C. Mooney in his book The Republican War on Science.

One of CRE's projects to promote public participation in the regulatory process is the establishment of the Interactive Public Docket.
