= U.S. Government peer review policies =

Most federal regulatory agencies in the United States government must comply with specific peer review requirements before the agencies publicly disseminate certain scientific information. These requirements were published in a Peer Review Bulletin issued by the White House Office of Management and Budget (OMB), which establishes "government-wide standards concerning when peer review is required and, if required, what type of peer review processes are appropriate."

== Bulletin ==
OMB's peer review bulletin requires that US federal regulatory agencies submit all "influential scientific information" to peer review before the information is publicly disseminated. The Bulletin defines "scientific information" as:

factual inputs, data, models, analyses, technical information, or scientific assessments related to such disciplines as the behavioral and social sciences, public health and medical sciences, life and earth sciences, engineering, or physical sciences.

This Bulletin defines "influential scientific information" as

scientific information the agency reasonably can determine will have or does have a clear and substantial impact on important public policies or private sector decisions. In the term 'influential scientific information,' the term 'influential' should be interpreted consistently with OMB's government-wide information quality guidelines and the information quality guidelines of the agency.

As noted in the preceding quotation, the Bulletin must be read in conjunction with "OMB's government-wide information quality guidelines and the information quality guidelines of the agency." These guidelines govern the quality of all information disseminated by most US government regulatory agencies. These guidelines are required by a US statute enacted in 2001 called the Data Quality Act and also known as the Information Quality Act ("IQA"). OMB states that it prepared the peer review Bulletin pursuant to OMB's authority under the IQA.

The peer review Bulletin provides detailed guidelines for peer review of influential scientific information. The Bulletin applies more stringent peer review requirements to "highly influential scientific assessments,"

which are a subset of influential scientific information. A scientific assessment is an evaluation of a body of scientific or technical knowledge that typically synthesizes multiple factual inputs, data, models, assumptions, and/or applies best professional judgment to bridge uncertainties in the available information.

== Comparison ==
The peer review Bulletin's specific guidelines differ in several respects from traditional peer review practices at most journals. For example, the Bulletin requires public disclosure of peer reviewers' identities when they are reviewing highly influential scientific assessments. The Bulletin's summary of some of these requirements is set forth below:

In general, an agency conducting a peer review of a highly influential scientific assessment must ensure that the peer review process is transparent by making available to the public the written charge to the peer reviewers, the peer reviewers' names, the peer reviewers' report(s), and the agency's response to the peer reviewers' report(s). ... This Bulletin requires agencies to adopt or adapt the committee selection policies employed by the National Academy of Sciences (NAS).

The peer review Bulletin specifically addresses the effect of publication in a refereed scientific journal as well the variations and limitations with peer review:

Publication in a refereed scientific journal may mean that adequate peer review has been performed. However, the intensity of peer review is highly variable across journals. There will be cases in which an agency determines that a more rigorous or transparent review process is necessary. For instance, an agency may determine a particular journal review process did not address questions (e.g., the extent of uncertainty inherent in a finding) that the agency determines should be addressed before disseminating that information. As such, prior "peer review and publication is not by itself sufficient grounds for determining that no further review is necessary.
