= E. Ross Buckley =

American politician (1921–1992)

5th Chair of the Occupational Safety and Health Review Commission
- In office August 9, 1984 – April 27, 1989
- President: Ronald Reagan; George H. W. Bush
- Preceded by: Robert A. Rowland
- Succeeded by: Edwin Foulke

Personal details
- Born: Elliot Ross Buckley; June 18, 1921 New York, New York, United States
- Died: June 30, 1992 (aged 71) Las Cruces, New Mexico, United States
- Party: Republican
- Spouse: Mary Smallpage (m. 1948)
- Children: 5, including John
- Relatives: William F. Buckley Sr. (uncle)
- Education: University of Texas (BA); Tulane University (LLB)
- Occupation: Lawyer; politician

Military service
- Branch/service: United States Army
- Battles/wars: World War II; Pacific theater
- Awards: Bronze Star Medal

Elliot Ross Buckley (June 18, 1921 – June 30, 1992) was an American lawyer and politician.

A nephew of William F. Buckley Sr. and first cousin of William F., James, Priscilla, Patricia, and Reid Buckley, he practiced law and was active in Republican Party politics in New Orleans after graduating from Tulane University Law School in 1949. In 1960, he ran against Democratic incumbent Hale Boggs for the U.S. House of Representatives from Louisiana's 2nd district. In 1962, he was the Republican nominee for Mayor of New Orleans. He moved to Vienna, Virginia in 1969, after the election of Richard Nixon to work in the United States Department of Justice. During this time, he served on the Vienna town council. He was appointed general counsel of the Occupational Safety and Health Review Commission in 1982 and served as the commission's chair from 1984 to 1989.
