= Federal Focus =

United States public relations and lobbying company

- Founded: 1986
- Founder: Thorne G. Auchter and James J. Tozzi
- Website: http://www.fedfocus.org/

Federal Focus, Inc was a public relations and lobbying company established about 1986 by Thorne G. Auchter (ex-head of the U.S. OSHA) and James J. Tozzi who had run the Office of Information and Regulatory Affairs (later to become the Office of Management and Budget during the first term of the Reagan Administration.

== About ==
Jim Tozzi resigned from his position as the "Deregulation czar" at the White House over conflicts of interest with some major industries in 1982, and Auchter resigned abruptly from the OSHA in March 1984. Tozzi initially worked as a consulting economist for a Washington law firm that provided lobbying services to the tobacco industry.

However they joined forces in about 1990 to establish Federal Focus and a year or so later they set up Multinational Business Services which Auchter mainly fronted. They also established and ran a pseudo-scientific operation with the name Institute for Regulatory Policy

The tobacco industry had initially assumed that their lobbying work for the Formaldehyde Institute and the chemical industry would automatically set them against tobacco as an alternative explanation for certain cancers, but the two industries came to appreciate that they had a common enemy in the Environmental Protection Agency (EPA) and the Food and Drug Administration (FDA) as well as with Auchter's old organisation the Occupational Safety and Health Administration (OSHA).

Tozzi and Auchter were working for the cigarette companies by July 1993. and they went on for many years earning themselves well over a million dollars.

In 1992 Tozzi produced a study for the tobacco industry in opposition to the EPA's Risk Assessment of lung cancer and respiratory effects from second hand smoking (known as ETS). They were only one of a number of institutions (some famous university departments) who received tobacco grants, and also some well-known scientists paid to promote the idea that 'risks' could be measured outside the discipline of biomedical research and epidemiology.

Federal Focus was given a $200,000 grant as a 501(C)(3) tax exempt corporation every year to create and maintain a running commentary on the importance of Risk Assessment and Risk Management in government agencies. They also had under their control other fake think-tank/scientific organisations such as the Center for the Study of Environmental Endocrine Effects, Center for Epidemiological Studies, and the Health Policy Institute.

Tozzi and Auchter were quite blatant in their use of their so-called non-profit organisations to provide richly rewarding lobbying services to the tobacco industry and Philip Morris (and probably other chemical companies) were willing to pay.
