= Voluntary Protection Programs Participants' Association =

Voluntary Protection Programs Participants' Association, Inc. (VPPPA)
- Founded: September 1985
- Founder: Ronald R. Amerson, Founding Chair
- Type: 501(c)(3) nonprofit organization
- Location: Falls Church, Virginia
- Members: 2,100+
- Key people: VPPPA National Board of Directors
- Employees: 15
- Website: http://www.vpppa.org

The Voluntary Protection Programs Participants’ Association, Inc. (VPPPA), is a nonprofit association of cooperative safety and health management systems. It organizes the largest VPP education event of the year, and promotes occupational health and safety.

Membership with the association is established on a site-by-site basis. Member sites consist of everything from refineries to office buildings to mobile workforces. There are currently over 2,100 member sites. The organization gives out achievement, outreach and innovation awards, and several scholarships on an annual basis. It holds ten chapter conferences in each of OSHA's regions every year, as well as the Annual National VPPPA Conference.

== See also ==
- Occupational Safety and Health Administration
