= John Buckley (Virginia politician) =

American politician (born 1953)

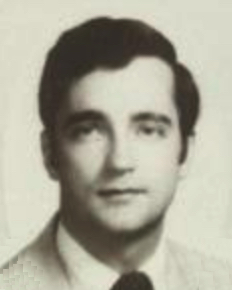
- Official portrait, 1980

Member of the Virginia House of Delegates from the 18th district
- In office January 9, 1980 – January 13, 1982 Serving with Vince Callahan, Martin Perper, Dorothy McDiarmid, & Jack Rust
- Preceded by: Ray Vickery
- Succeeded by: Ken Plum

8th National Chair of Young Americans for Freedom
- In office 1977–1978
- Preceded by: Jeffrey Kane
- Succeeded by: James V. Lacy

Personal details
- Born: John Smallpage Buckley; August 3, 1953 (age 72) New Orleans, Louisiana, U.S.
- Party: Libertarian; Republican (until c. 1990s)
- Parent: E. Ross Buckley (father)
- Education: University of Virginia; William & Mary Law School

John Smallpage Buckley (born August 3, 1953) is an American attorney and a former Republican member of the Virginia House of Delegates. At age 26, he was the youngest member of that body, when he won election in 1979. He previously served as the national chair of Young Americans for Freedom, a conservative political organization founded by his cousin, William F. Buckley Jr. He is the former chief of staff to the United States Court of Federal Claims.

== West Virginia politics ==
In 2014, Buckley ran in neighboring West Virginia as the Libertarian candidate for US Senate, he came in third with 7,409 votes. In 2016, Buckley was the Libertarian nominee for West Virginia Secretary of State. Buckley was endorsed by the Charleston Gazette-Mail, West Virginia's largest newspaper.

== Personal life ==
Buckley is gay and lives with a same-sex partner. His father, politician and Reagan administration official E. Ross Buckley, was a nephew of William F. Buckley Sr. and first cousin of William F., James, Priscilla, Patricia, and Reid Buckley.
