= Edwin Foulke =

American lawyer

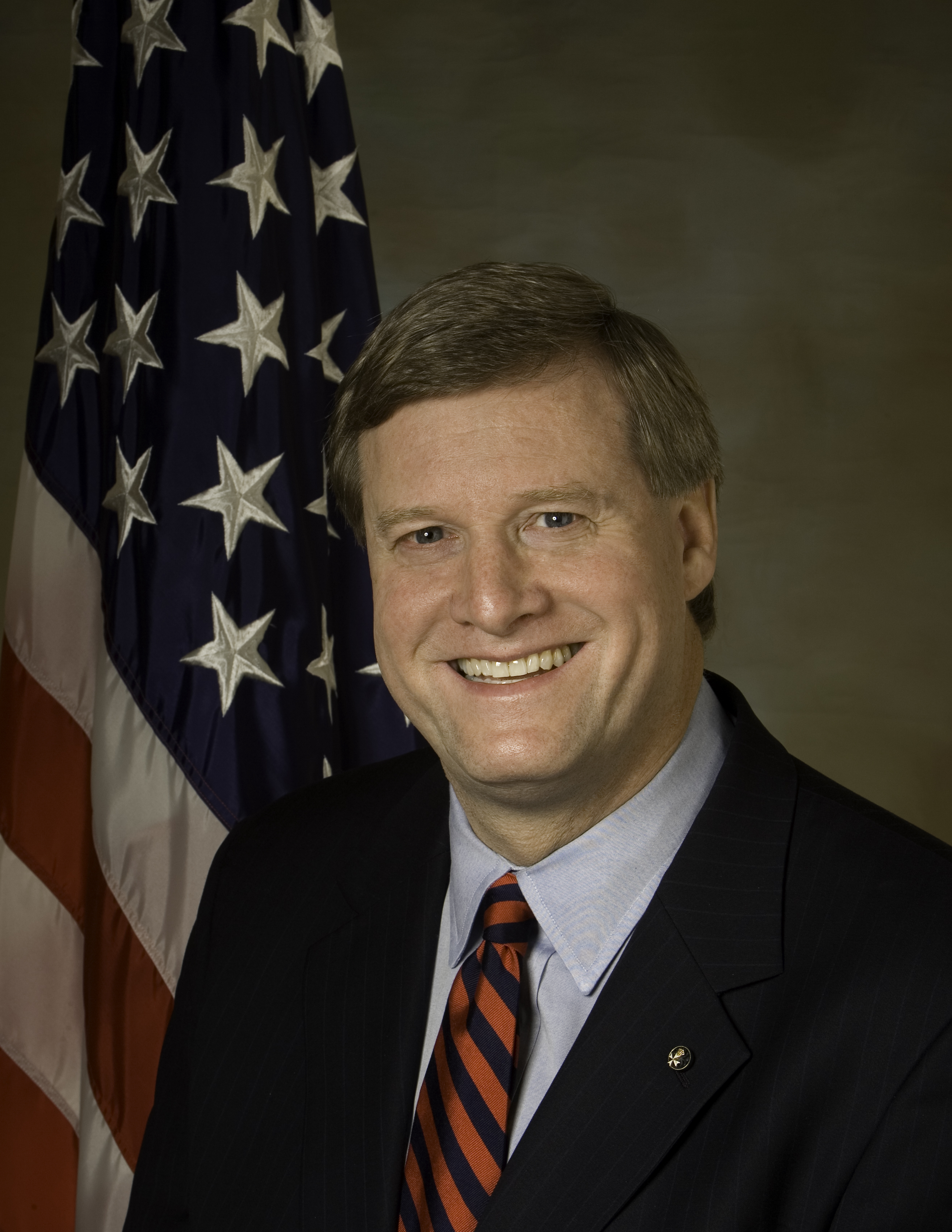
- Official portrait, 2006

United States Assistant Secretary of Labor for Occupational Safety and Health
- In office April 3, 2006 – November 7, 2008
- President: George W. Bush
- Preceded by: John L. Henshaw
- Succeeded by: David Michaels

Chair of the Occupational Safety and Health Review Commission
- In office March 1, 1990 – February 22, 1994
- President: George H. W. Bush; Bill Clinton
- Preceded by: E. Ross Buckley
- Succeeded by: Stuart E. Weisberg

Personal details
- Born: Edwin Gerhart Foulke Jr.
- Party: Republican
- Profession: Lawyer

Edwin Gerhart Foulke Jr. is an American lawyer who served as the Assistant Secretary of Labor. In 2006, Foulke was nominated by U.S. President George W. Bush to head the Occupational Safety and Health Administration and had assumed the position until November 2008. Foulke is currently a partner at Fisher & Phillips in Atlanta, Georgia.

== Education ==
He received his bachelor's degree with honors from the North Carolina State University in Raleigh, North Carolina in 1974. He went on to receive his J.D. degree from Loyola University School of Law in New Orleans in 1978 and a Master of Laws in Labor Law from Georgetown University Law Center in Washington, D.C.

== Government career ==
Prior to his nomination, Foulke was a partner with the law firm of Jackson Lewis, LLP in Greenville, South Carolina, and Washington, D.C., where he chaired the firm's OSHA practice group. His practice areas included all topics of labor relations, specializing in occupational safety and health issues, workplace violence risk assessment and prevention, and accident and fatality prevention. From 1990 to 1995, Foulke served on the Occupational Safety and Health Review Commission, chairing the commission from March 1990 to February 1994. The three-member commission is an independent federal adjudicatory agency that renders decisions involving workplace safety and health citations arising from OSHA inspections. Foulke served on the Workplace Health and Safety Committee for the Society for Human Resource Management from 2000 to 2004, including a two-year term as the committee's chair. He was also a member of the Health and Safety Subcommittee for the U.S. Chamber of Commerce. Foulke has authored articles on workplace safety and health for various entities, including the South Carolina Chamber of Commerce, American Bar Association, the South Carolina Bar Association, and the North Carolina Citizens for Business and Industry.
