= Robert A. Rowland =

American lawyer and government official

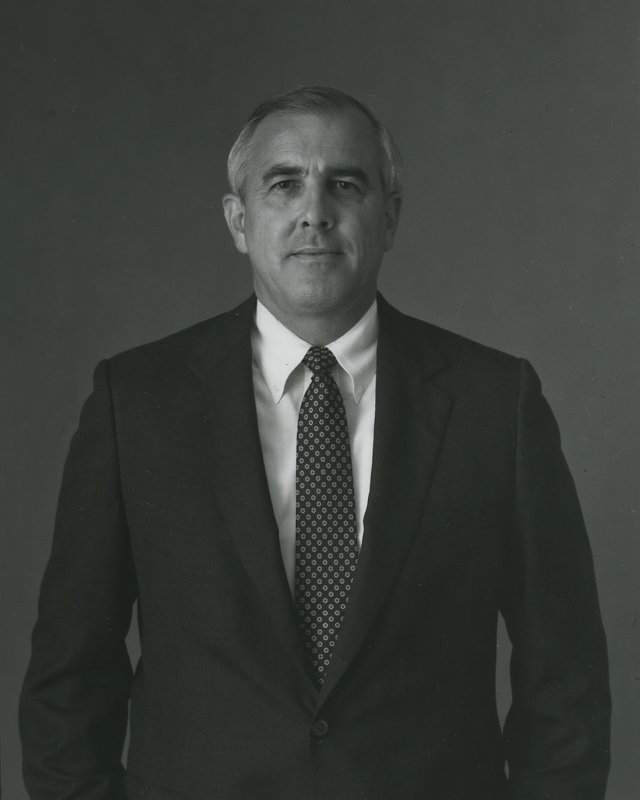
- Portrait by Michael Evans, 1983

United States Assistant Secretary of Labor for Occupational Safety and Health
- In office July 1984 – July 1, 1985
- President: Ronald Reagan
- Preceded by: Thorne G. Auchter
- Succeeded by: John A. Pendergrass

4th Chair of the Occupational Safety and Health Review Commission
- In office August 2, 1981 – July 22, 1984
- President: Ronald Reagan
- Preceded by: Timothy F. Cleary
- Succeeded by: E. Ross Buckley

Personal details
- Born: Robert Adrian Rowland; March 23, 1932 Houston, Texas, U.S.
- Died: August 10, 2001 (aged 69)
- Party: Republican
- Spouse: Linda Aliece Falvey (m. 1957)
- Education: University of Texas (BA, LLB)
- Occupation: Lawyer

Robert Adrian Rowland (March 23, 1932 – August 10, 2001) was an American lawyer who was appointed by Ronald Reagan via recess appointment to head the Occupational Safety and Health Administration in 1984 but was not confirmed by the U.S. Senate and resigned on May 25, 1985, effective July 1, amid ethics concerns. A millionaire Republican Party fund-raiser, he previously served as Texas chair of Reagan's 1980 campaign and chaired the Occupational Safety and Health Review Commission from 1981 to 1984.
