= Interactive Public Docket =

The Interactive Public Docket (IPD) is an eRulemaking tool created and managed by non governmental organizations that seek to provide the public with the capability to 1) publicly post data and other materials pertaining to federal proceedings on a continuous basis, including after the close of the Administrative Procedure Act comment period and 2) post comments on already submitted materials.

The IPD was first developed by the Center for Regulatory Effectiveness and its origins have been discussed on National Public Radio.

The Obama Administration's Transparency and Open Government initiative seeks to address some of the same issues public participation goals as the IPDs.

Current IPDs include CMS Competitive Bidding and Ocean Zoning. The National Institute of Standards and Technology has developed its own set of Interactive Public Dockets for its National Cybersecurity Center of Excellence.
