= 1965 New Orleans mayoral election =

- November 6, 1965
Candidate	Victor H. Schiro	Jimmy Fitzmorris
Party	Democratic	Democratic
Popular vote	81,973	78,654
Percentage	50.1%	48.1%
Mayor before election
Victor Schiro
Democratic
Elected mayor
Victor Schiro
Democratic

The New Orleans mayoral election of 1965 resulted in the re-election of Victor Schiro to his second full term as Mayor of New Orleans. No runoff was needed, as Schiro received over 50% of the vote. Elections were held on November 6.

== Results ==
Democratic Party Primary, November 6, 1965

Candidate	Votes received	Percentage of total vote
Victor Schiro (incumbent)	81,973	50.1%
Jimmy Fitzmorris	78,654	48.1%
Addison Roswell Thompson	2,121	1.3%
Joseph Held	458	0.3%
Doris Perkins	226	0.1%

Gerald J. Gallinghouse withdrew before the primary to endorse Fitzmorris.
