= Ray Vickery =

American attorney and politician

United States Assistant Secretary of Commerce for Trade Development
- In office 1994–1998
- President: Bill Clinton
- Preceded by: James D. Jameson
- Succeeded by: Michael Copps

Member of the Virginia House of Delegates from the 18th district
- In office January 9, 1974 – January 9, 1980
- Preceded by: David A. Sutherland
- Succeeded by: John Buckley

Personal details
- Born: Raymond Ezekiel Vickery Jr. April 30, 1942 (age 84) Brookhaven, Mississippi, U.S.
- Party: Democratic
- Spouse: Ann
- Education: Duke University (AB); University of Sri Lanka; Harvard University (JD)

Raymond Ezekiel Vickery Jr. (born April 30, 1942) is an American attorney and politician. From 1974 to 1980, he served as a Democratic member of the Virginia House of Delegates. Rather than seek reelection in 1979, he challenged incumbent Charles Waddell for the Democratic nomination in Virginia's 33rd Senate district. In 1992, he unsuccessfully ran for Congress against Frank Wolf.

An expert on India–United States relations, he served as United States Assistant Secretary of Commerce for Trade Development under Bill Clinton.
