= Data Quality Act =

US federal law on improving civil service information

The Information Quality Act (IQA) or Data Quality Act (DQA) was enacted in the United States Congress under Section 515 of the Consolidated Appropriations Act, 2001 (Pub. L. 106–554 (text) (PDF)). As the Act was a two-sentence rider in a spending bill, it had no given name. The Government Accountability Office uses the name "Information Quality Act".

IQA directs the Office of Management and Budget (OMB) to issue government-wide guidelines that "provide policy and procedural guidance to federal agencies for ensuring and maximizing the quality, objectivity, utility, and integrity of information (including statistical information) disseminated by Federal agencies". Other federal agencies must also publish their own guidelines for information quality and peer review agendas.

== Text of the IQA ==
Consolidated Appropriations Act, 2001 Sec. 515 reads:

(a) In General. – The Director of the Office of Management and Budget shall, by not later than September 30, 2001, and with public and Federal agency involvement, issue guidelines under sections 3504(d)(1) and 3516 of title 44, United States Code, that provide policy and procedural guidance to Federal agencies for ensuring and maximizing the quality, objectivity, utility, and integrity of information (including statistical information) disseminated by Federal agencies in fulfillment of the purposes and provisions of chapter 35 of title 44, United States Code, commonly referred to as the Paperwork Reduction Act.

(b) Content of Guidelines. – The guidelines under subsection (a) shall –

(1) apply to the sharing by Federal agencies of, and access to, information disseminated by Federal agencies; and
(2) require that each Federal agency to which the guidelines apply –

(A) issue guidelines ensuring and maximizing the quality, objectivity, utility, and integrity of information (including statistical information) disseminated by the agency, by not later than 1 year after the date of issuance of the guidelines under subsection (a);
(B) establish administrative mechanisms allowing affected persons to seek and obtain correction of information maintained and disseminated by the agency that does not comply with the guidelines issued under subsection (a); and
(C) report periodically to the Director –

(i) the number and nature of complaints received by the agency regarding the accuracy of information disseminated by the agency; and
(ii) how such complaints were handled by the agency.

== Guidelines developed pursuant to IQA ==
=== OMB guidelines ===
- OMB, Guidelines for Ensuring and Maximizing the Quality, Objectivity, Utility, and Integrity of Information Disseminated by Federal Agencies, Final Guidelines, with Request for Comments (Oct 1, 2001)
- OMB, Guidelines (Draft of Jan. 3, 2002)
- OMB, Guidelines for Ensuring and Maximizing the Quality, Objectivity, Utility, and Integrity of Information Disseminated by Federal Agencies, Final Guidelines (corrected), 67 Fed. Reg. 8452 (Feb. 22. 2002)

=== Guidelines developed by agencies pursuant to IQA and OMB guidelines ===
- Federal Trade Commission FTC Information Quality Guidelines
- Health and Human Services HHS Information Quality / Peer Review Ensuring the Quality of Information Disseminated by HHS Agencies
- NASA Requirements for Documentation, Approval, and Dissemination of NASA Scientific and Technical Information
- Patent and Trademark Office Information Quality Guidelines
- List of links to all Cabinet, Executive Agency, and Independent Regulatory Agency guidelines

== Criticism ==
The Data Quality Act has been criticized as providing a vehicle for special interest groups to challenge regulations on the grounds of not meeting information quality requirements. However, others view unchecked data and lack of peer-review as a tool of political corruption leading to the imposition of arbitrary and capricious regulations. The "driving force behind the IQA", Jim Tozzi, said "there’s no doubt that we were funded by industry" and they wanted the IQA to be used as a tool to challenge government information. However, it does not confer any right to judicial review if people have sought to change information and been unsuccessful in convincing the agency (see below).

== Information Quality Act failing as a basis for law suits ==
The Competitive Enterprise Institute filed a lawsuit to prevent dissemination of Environmental Protection Agency (EPA)'s "Climate Action Report 2002" published May 2002, claiming the research did not meet requirements of the Federal Data Quality Act (FDQA), which came into effect in October 2002. The case was dismissed in November 2003.

In 2004, a multi-party dispute regarding the management of the Missouri River led to a case in which the District Court declared that "the IQA directs the Office of Management and Budget ("OMB") to issue guidelines that provide policy and procedural guidance to Federal agencies for ensuring and maximizing the quality, objectivity, utility, and integrity of information disseminated by the agency, the plain language of the legislation fails to define these terms. 44 U.S.C. § 3516. Moreover, the history of the legislation fails to provide any indication as to the scope of these terms. Absent any "meaningful standard" against which to evaluate the agency's discretion, the Court finds that Congress did not intend the IQA to provide a private cause of action, and therefore Blaske Marine Plaintiffs' IQA claim fails."

Four days after this judgement the Department of Justice reiterated that "The language of the IQA reflects Congress's intent that any challenges to the quality of information disseminated by federal agencies should take place in administrative proceedings before federal agencies and not in the courts. The first and only court to address this issue determined that the IQA does not provide for a private cause of action.”.

This statement was made in a brief that successfully asked for the dismissal of a lawsuit lodged by the Salt Institute (a salt-producers' association) and the U.S. Chamber of Commerce against the Department of Health and Human Services in federal court using the Information Quality Act. The suit alleged that federal scientists lacked evidence that salt was harmful to health but was dismissed by a trial and appellate court. The Journal of the American Dietetic Association and the National Heart, Lung and Blood Institute (NHLBI) which is part of the US National Institutes of Health claimed that the food industry is adding too much salt to foods. The motion to dismiss was granted "because the Plaintiffs lack standing to sue, there is no private right of action under the Information Quality Act, and the NHLBI's actions regarding the DASH-Sodium Trial data are not subject to judicial review under the Administrative Procedure Act."

In July 2019, the Department of Justice maintained that there was "no basis" for lawsuits based on the Information Quality Act. Protect Democracy Project Inc. and the Brennan Center for Justice had filed a suit demanding the U. S. Department of Justice and Department of Homeland Security correct a report linking immigration with terrorism. The report remained online, unchanged.
