= 1962 New Orleans mayoral election =

- March 3, 1962
Candidate	Victor H. Schiro	Adrian G. Duplantier
Party	Democratic	Democratic
Popular vote	94,157	73,057
Percentage	56.3%	43.7%
Mayor before election
Victor Schiro
Democratic
Elected mayor
Victor Schiro
Democratic

The New Orleans mayoral election of 1962 resulted in the election of interim mayor Victor Schiro to his first full term as mayor of New Orleans.

== Results ==
First Democratic Party Primary, January 27, 1962

Candidate	Votes received
Adrian G. Duplantier	57,001
Victor Schiro (incumbent)	52,685
James A. Comiskey	37,557
Paul Burke	18,913
Addison Roswell Thompson	742
Anthony Deckelmann	472
Frank Ber	350
Joseph Janusa	192
Allen LaCombe	126

Second Democratic Party Primary, March 3, 1962

Candidate	Votes received
Victor Schiro (incumbent)	94,157
Adrian Duplantier	73,057

== Sources ==
- Orleans Parish Democratic Executive Committee. Mayoralty: First and Second Democratic Primary Elections, 1962.
