= Jim Tozzi =

American lobbyist

Jim Tozzi is an American lobbyist, currently the head of the Center for Regulatory Effectiveness, an industry-supported, for-profit lobbying organization that describes itself as a "regulatory watchdog." Formerly, he was a regulatory official of the United States Office of Management and Budget (OMB). His partner for many years was Thorne G. Auchter and they ran two main lobbying organisations, Federal Focus and Multinational Business Services.

These two lobbying operations worked for both the chemical and the tobacco industries for many years. Philip Morris renewed their request for a tax-free gift of $200,000 each year.

== Career ==
Tozzi was instrumental in the passage of the Paperwork Reduction Act and the establishment of the OMB's Office of Information and Regulatory Affairs in 1980. Under his directorship, the Office of Information and Regulatory Affairs was the gatekeeper for virtually all proposed regulations dealing with public health and safety.

Tozzi was the Deputy Administrator of OMB in charge of the OIRA (and therefore of the regulatory agencies) when he left the organization in 1983 at age 45.

Tozzi's role in the DQA was analyzed as a case study in policy entrepreneurship in a National Science Foundation-funded study, "Lobbying and Policymaking: The Public Pursuit of Private Interests", by R. Kenneth Godwin, Scott Ainsworth and Erik K. Godwin. The article "Policy Entrepreneurs: The Power of Audacity" published by RegBlog, an online publication of the University of Pennsylvania Law School, discussed Tozzi's work on both the PRA and the DQA as examples of policy entrepreneurship.

In 1980, it was discovered that there was a link between the intake of aspirin and the occurrence of Reye's syndrome in small children. Tozzi's lobby work delayed the issuing of warning labels on aspirin packages by some five years, after which the number of Reye's-related deaths dropped considerably.

== Personal life ==
Tozzi resides in Alexandria, Virginia with his main office in Dupont Circle in Washington, DC. He is currently working on many projects, including nationwide medical marijuana legalization.
