= Thorne G. Auchter =

American lobbyist

Thorne Auchter is the former Director of the U.S. Occupational Safety & Health Administration (OSHA) from 1981 to 1984, during the early part of the Reagan Administration, replacing former President Jimmy Carter's appointee Eula Bingham. He is also the former director of the American lobbying group Federal Focus' Institute for Regulatory Policy.

Historians Kevin M. Kruse and Julian E. Zelizer have written that Auchter's appointment to head OSHA illustrates the Reagan Administration strategy for undermining New Deal programs by appointing key officials who opposed the stated mission of their agencies. Autchter's construction firm "had repeatedly been fined by OSHA in the past."

In 1994, Auchter testified to OSHA's Public Meeting on Standards Planning Process on the safety of secondhand smoke.

== See also ==
- Good Epidemiological Practices
