= Wayne Laugesen =

American journalist

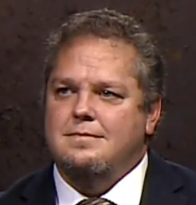
- Born: Wayne Laugesen; Philadelphia, Pennsylvania, United States
- Occupations: Writer, pundit, editor
- Spouse: Dede Laugesen
- Children: Six, all male.
- Writing career
- Genre: Nonfiction/journalistic
- Subject: Public policy/economics/law
- Notable awards: Investigative Reporters and Editors Top 100 Investigations; Distinguished Commentary, Society for Professional Journalists (Sigma Delta Chi)
- Movement: Conservative

Wayne Laugesen is a conservative American writer, video producer, school choice advocate, and former editorial pages editor of The Gazette, of Denver and Colorado Springs (January 2008-October 2025). Laugesen writes for The Washington Examiner, the National Catholic Register, Faith & Family magazine, and other national and international publications. He is the former managing editor of Soldier of Fortune, managing editor of Boulder Weekly, and executive editor of "Consumers' Research"—a former Washington-based magazine that blamed excessive government regulations for burdening consumers.

Laugesen co-produced the Catholic prayer series, "Holy Baby!"—which was sold and broadcast internationally in the early 2000's. He founded and hosts the cross-platform, center-right "Wayne's Word" video podcast.

== Education freedom ==
During a 17-year tenure as The Gazette's opinion editor, Laugesen led a crusade against the National Education Association, the Colorado Education Association, and all other major teachers' unions, which ranked among a slew of concerns published by a former employer. His work often blamed unions for poor academic outcomes based on testing results that show a majority of students falling behind what he characterized as "low" state minimum standards. During the first Trump administration, he authored an in-depth article after spending a day with then-Education Secretary Betsy DeVos. Editorials under his direction frequently blamed unions for exacerbating "racism" and "sexism" as manifestations of Critical Race Theory, identity politics, and the Colorado Education Association's official statement denouncing capitalism—a key element of school competition Laugesen advocates.

== War on regulations ==
Laugesen has criticized urban planners who advocate "affordable housing" while harming minorities and the poor with anti-growth policies. His work became the topic of a journalistic ethics debate in 2004, when he publicly destroyed windows from a Boulder, Colorado, home—with full cooperation of the homeowner, and Laugesen's publisher—to protest preservation orders by Boulder city planners that he and other critics considered excessive and unconstitutional. The action led media critic Michael Roberts to coin the phrase "commando journalism" in Westword.

== Second Amendment ==
As managing editor of Soldier of Fortune in the 1990s, Laugesen led an effort—hosted in the main branch of the Boulder Public Library—to obtain guns and NRA-certified defense training for women in a neighborhood that was stalked by a serial burglar and rapist. His effort led to widespread attention in the Denver-Boulder media market, which correlated with an end of the break-ins and rapes. The suspected rapist, Bradford Thomas Wagner, was arrested years later and hanged himself in the Boulder County Jail.

Laugesen brought the obscure Vice Principal Joel Myrick to the forefront by awarding him the annual Soldier of Fortune "Humanitarian Award" for using a handgun to stop a school massacre in Pearl, Mississippi.

== Catholic sex abuse scandal ==
As the National Catholic Register's correspondent covering the United States Conference of Catholic Bishops in Dallas, after the Catholic sexual abuse scandal surfaced, Laugesen is cited for research that contrasts the crisis in Catholic institutions with similar and systemic problems in other religious and secular organizations.

== Drugs ==
As a social, cultural and economic conservative, Laugesen has been critical of the war on drugs. His drug-war research often appears on web sites hosted by the National Organization for the Reform of Marijuana Laws and other organizations devoted to drug legalization. Laugesen's research into the DARE program (Drug Abuse Resistance Education) led to articles used by campaigns to reform DARE or remove it from K-12 schools.

After trying to expose the Reagan-Bush era "war on drugs" as ineffective, Laugesen became a routine critic of Colorado's legalization of cannabis and decriminalization of fentanyl and other street drugs. Laugesen and The Gazette's editorial board were widely criticized in 2015 for producing the series Clearing the Haze, which blasted state regulations and regulators for problems with Colorado's recreational and medicinal marijuana industries.

== Religious controversies ==
A zionist, Laugesen often defends Israel and Judaism. Despite leading his editorial board to maintain a pro-Israel stand, a 2008 cover story in the Colorado Springs Independent, an alternative newsweekly, accused him of anti-Semitism after the publication intercepted an e-mail exchange between Laugesen and an official of the Military Religious Freedom Foundation—a left-leaning organization that fights against Christian expression and symbolism in the U.S. military. Other media reported on the controversy and the allegations were quickly refuted by a reputable Jewish publisher.

As a defender of religious liberty, Laugesen has become a frequent topic of criticism by atheist leader PZ Myers. Dozens of other well-known atheist leaders have criticized Laugesen.

Laugesen was featured on national television and radio to discuss the Denver City Council's 2015 opposition to Chick-fil-A operating at the Denver International Airport. Chic-fil-A opponents took issue with the chain's then-CEO, Dan Cathy, offering verbal and financial support for traditional marriage and family.

== Video producer ==
Laugesen and his wife, Dede, are co-producers of "Holy Baby!", a popular series of multilingual prayer videos for children—long broadcast worldwide on EWTN—that have been referred to as "The Catholic Baby Einstein.

Laugesen launched his personal cross-platform podcast, "Wayne's Word: uncensored," in early 2025. It quickly attracted millions of viewers after Laugesen began questioning left-wing protesters, including The Denver Communists, at outdoor protests. Despite the popularity of Wayne's Word man-on-the-street episodes, the show is mostly devoted to long-form interviews with business leaders, activists, and leading politician including Gov. Jared Polis, D-Colorado, Colorado gubernatorial candidate Victor Marx, and State's Attorney Gen. Phil Weiser, D-Colorado.

== Personal ==
Laugesen, a Philadelphia native, explains that his philosophy was influenced by his conservative stepfather and his widowed mother. As a college student, Laugesen became a protege of M. Stanton Evans—a conservative Yale alumnus who founded the Education and Research Institute, the National Journalism Center, and co-authored with William F. Buckley, Jr., "The Sharon Statement"—known as a 20th-Century blueprint that guided and coalesced the Reagan coalition of social, cultural, and economic conservatives.
