= Thomas Bisson =

Thomas Bisson may refer to:

- Thomas N. Bisson, American historian and medievalist
- Thomas Arthur Bisson, American political writer
