= Medford Evans =

Medford Evans may refer to:

- Medford Bryan Evans (1907–1989), author and conservative activist
- Medford Stanton Evans (1934–2015), his son, a journalist and conservative activist
