= Young America's Foundation =

American political youth organization

Coordinates: 38.9676°N 77.3652°W

- Abbreviation: YAF
- Formation: 1969; 57 years ago
- Type: Youth organization
- Legal status: 501(c)(3) nonprofit organization
- Purpose: Conservative activism
- Headquarters: 11480 Commerce Park Drive, Sixth Floor, Reston, Virginia 20191
- Region served: United States
- President: Scott Walker
- Affiliations: Young Americans for Freedom; National Journalism Center; The Reagan Ranch
- Budget: Revenue: $41.6 million Expenses: $36.5 million (FYE 2024)
- Staff: 75 (2023)
- Website: yaf.org

Young America's Foundation (YAF) is a 501(c)(3) non-profit conservative youth organization founded in 1969. In 2018, the Los Angeles Times called YAF "one of the most preeminent, influential, and controversial forces in the nation's conservative youth movement". Scott Walker, former governor of Wisconsin and 2016 Republican presidential candidate, became president of YAF in February 2021. Notable alumni members include Jeff Sessions and Stephen Miller.

== History ==
Young America's Foundation held the first National Conservative Student Conference in 1979. It is a co-founder of the annual Conservative Political Action Conference and has been a prominent supporter of the event since then.

In 1998, it purchased the Reagan Ranch, "Rancho del Cielo", near Santa Barbara, California, with the help of a $10 million endowment from Amway billionaires Richard and Helen DeVos. Donations, including $200,000 from orthodontist Dr. Robert Ruhe, allowed YAF to redeem the mortgage on the Reagan Ranch early. YAF president Ron Robinson said YAF's goal was to preserve both Reagan's legacy and the ranch itself and that it would maintain the facilities as they existed when the Reagans lived there.

According to Time magazine, by 2004, there were no left-wing youth organizations as powerful as The Young America's Foundation (YAF), The Intercollegiate Studies Institute (ISI) and The Leadership Institute. The Time article noted that in surveys of incoming college students by the American Council on Education, a "majority of 2003 freshmen – 53% – wanted affirmative action abolished, compared with only 43% of all adults. Two-thirds of freshmen favored abortion rights in 1992; only 55% did so in last year's survey. Support for gun control has slipped in recent years among the young, and last year 53% of students believed that 'wealthy people should pay a larger share of taxes than they do now,' compared with 72% 11 years earlier". The New York Times cited more polling in 2005 to describe American college students' "renewed shift pronouncedly to the right on many defining issues", a movement it said was "fueled and often financed by an array of conservative interest groups" including Young Americans for Freedom, Young America's Foundation, the Leadership Institute, the Collegiate Network, and the Intercollegiate Studies Institute.

By 2017, YAF had 250 high school and college affiliates known as Young Americans for Freedom, which was originally a separate organization.

In July 2019, it was announced that former Governor of Wisconsin Scott Walker would become YAF's president in 2021.

In November 2019, YAF cut ties with a long-time featured speaker, Michelle Malkin, who voiced her support for alt-right activist Nick Fuentes.

YAF's stated mission is "ensuring that increasing numbers of young Americans understand and are inspired by the ideas of individual freedom, a strong national defense, free enterprise, and traditional values."

YAF is a member of the advisory board of Project 2025, a collection of conservative and right-wing policy proposals from the Heritage Foundation to reshape the United States federal government and consolidate executive power should the Republican nominee win the 2024 presidential election.

YAF has twice sued the Know Your Enemy podcast charging trademark infringement due to a satirical labeling of a membership tier on Patreon as "Young Americans for Freedom".

== Programs ==
Young America's Foundation is a tax-exempt educational foundation. The Foundation's programs include lectures on college and high school campuses, conferences throughout the United States, and campus activism initiatives. These programs are broadcast on C-SPAN. Young America's Foundation also preserves the Ronald Reagan Ranch and his Boyhood Home, runs the National Journalism Center (NJC), and oversees Young Americans for Freedom.

=== The National Journalism Center ===
The National Journalism Center which was founded in 1977 by M. Stanton Evans, is currently a project of Young America's Foundation that places college students and recent graduates at media organizations in the Washington, D.C. area. Notable alumni include Ann Coulter, Tim Carney, and Malcolm Gladwell.

=== Young Americans for Freedom ===
On March 16, 2011, Young Americans for Freedom (YAF) passed a National Board Resolution which resulted in the merger of the organization into the Young America's Foundation on April 1, 2011. YAF was founded on September 11, 1960, at the family home of William F. Buckley in Sharon, Connecticut. The charter for the Young Americans for Freedom, written by M. Stanton Evans, the Sharon Statement,was described by K.E.Grubbs in 2010 as "the late 20th century's single most elegant distillation of conservative principles". The Heritage Foundation described the Sharon Statement as "a succinct summary of the central ideas of modern American conservatism".

== Funding ==
Donors include Pat Sajak and Amway billionaires Richard and Helen DeVos. Robert Ruhe (1929–2013), an orthodontist in California, was the single largest donor of the YAF, with his legacy estate gift of $16 million. This resulted in a doubling of YAF's programming, which includes campus speeches. During his lifetime he and his wife donated generously to YAF, particularly in terms of paying off the mortgage of the Reagan Ranch.

== See also ==
- State Policy Network: a U.S. national network of free-market oriented think tanks of which Young America's Foundation is an associate member
