= 1978 Maryland Comptroller election =

- November 7, 1978
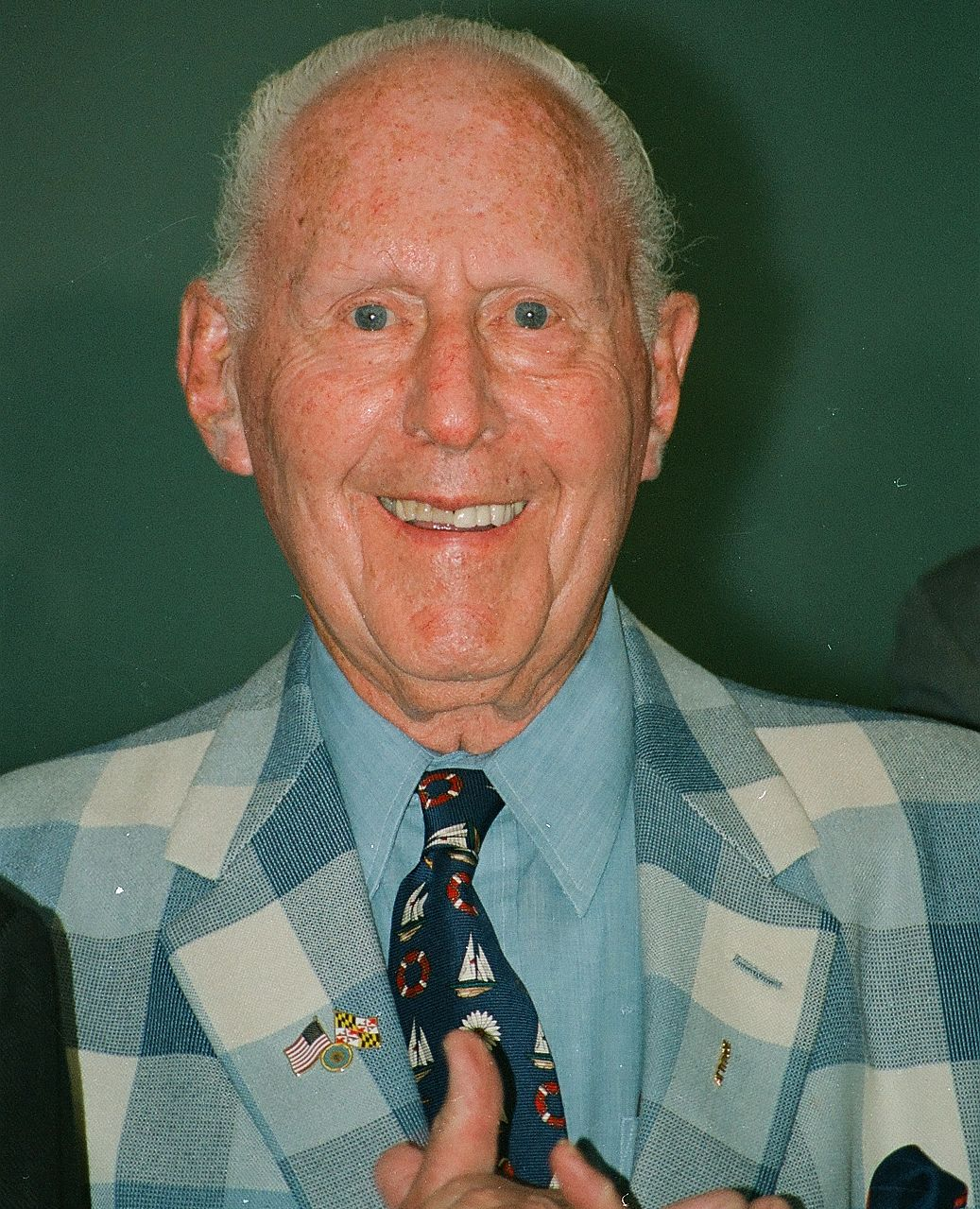

Nominee	Louis L. Goldstein	Donald J. Devine
Party	Democratic	Republican
Popular vote	659,415	246,492
Percentage	72.79%	27.21%
- County results Goldstein: 50–60% 60–70% 70–80% 80–90%
Comptroller before election
Louis L. Goldstein
Democratic
Elected Comptroller
Louis L. Goldstein
Democratic

The 1978 Maryland comptroller election was held on November 7, 1978, in order to elect the comptroller of Maryland. Democratic nominee and incumbent comptroller Louis L. Goldstein defeated Republican nominee Donald J. Devine.

== General election ==
On election day, November 7, 1978, Democratic nominee Louis L. Goldstein won re-election by a margin of 412,923 votes against his opponent Republican nominee Donald J. Devine, thereby retaining Democratic control over the office of comptroller. Goldstein was sworn in for his sixth term on January 3, 1979.

=== Results ===
Maryland Comptroller election, 1978
Party	Candidate	Votes	%
Democratic	Louis L. Goldstein (incumbent)	659,415	72.79
Republican	Donald J. Devine	246,492	27.21
Total votes		905,907	100.00
Democratic hold			
