= Thomas Arthur Bisson =

American political writer (1900–1979)

Thomas Arthur Bisson, who wrote as T. A. Bisson (New York City, 1900–1979) was an American political writer, journalist, and government official who specialized in East Asian politics and economics.

In the 1920s and 1930s, he worked for the Foreign Policy Association and the Institute for Pacific Relations and wrote sympathetically about the Chinese Communist Party (CCP).

He served in the American government during World War II and then was an officer in the Occupation of Japan. He taught at University of California, Berkeley in the early 1950s but was let go after he came under criticism for his support of the CCP and because of accusations that he had been a wartime spy for the Soviet Union.

In the 1930s and the 1940s, Bisson wrote prolifically on China, Japan, India, Mongolia, international relations, politics, and economics for the American public in a series of books and pamphlets for the Foreign Policy Association. His most prominent book is Zaibatsu Dissolution in Japan (University of California Press, 1954).

== Education and early career ==
Bisson graduated from Rutgers University in 1923, then went as a Presbyterian missionary to teach English and Classics in Anhui province, China, and then taught at Yenching University in Beijing. He studied the Chinese language and developed a sympathy for the anti-imperialist program of the Kuomintang, but was disheartened when Chiang Kai-shek gained control and crushed the left wing, including communists.

Bisson left China in 1928 to enroll at Columbia University. He left Columbia before he could finish the doctoral program, however, to work for the Foreign Policy Association, which had been founded in 1918 to inform the American public about world affairs. He later explained that at that time he had a wife and two children: "I went into politics to make a living."

Between 1934 and 1937, Bisson, under the pseudonym "Frederick Spencer," wrote dozens of articles supporting the CCP in China in China Today, a magazine edited by Philip Jaffe, a left-wing businessman and frequent collaborator with the American Communist Party. Financed by the FPA and the Rockefeller Foundation, he traveled in China, including a 1937 automobile trip that he and several friends, including Owen Lattimore and Philip Jaffe, made from Beijing to Yan'an to interview Mao Zedong and other CCP leaders. His book Japan in China (1938) was a detailed account of the recent Japanese invasion, based on his own extensive travels in China. Although it drew on his trip, Bisson did not publish his detailed account of the Yan'an visit until 1973, immediately after US President Richard Nixon went to China.

Yenan in June 1937: Talks with the Communist Leaders is his journal, complete with photographs of the CCP leaders and the travelers' canvas-topped touring car being towed out of mud by oxen and local villagers.

== World War II ==
Bisson was recruited into government service in 1942, within a few weeks after Pearl Harbor. His assignment was the Board of Economic Warfare, charged with advising the government on how the mobilization and redirecting of economic resources could affect the war effort throughout the globe. The Board, chaired by Vice President Henry Wallace, competed for influence with other executive offices and was criticized as a refuge for left-wingers.

Bisson worked on plans to disrupt the flow of war supplies to Japan, which called on the knowledge of East Asian economics that he had built up in his research at the Foreign Policy Association.

In April 1943, Bisson was one of the officials called to testify before US Representative Martin Dies's committee. Then, Bisson's positive assessments of the CCP came under fire.

Bisson defended himself, saying that the US army leaders now also saw the need for Soviet support against fascism and that he had come to Washington, DC, at a financial sacrifice because he was a "loyal American citizen."

The Board of Economic Welfare became controversial even within the Democratic Party, and Bisson left to become Research Associate of the Institute of Pacific Relations (IPR) in New York and Associate Editor of its journal, Pacific Affairs.

During his two years at IPR, Bisson published articles, book reviews, editorials, and books that criticized American policies and argued that they held back the hopes of Asian peoples for self-determination and that their claims were legitimate but had been thwarted by domestic militarists and western imperialists. His 1943 article in Far Eastern Survey attacked the Chinese Nationalists in China as "feudal" and asserted that the Communists were more effective. He wrote that the Communists were practicing something like "bourgeois democracy" in an agrarian setting and that it was "by no stretch of the imagination" that they could be regarded as genuine communists.

He revised American's Far Eastern Policy, a survey that he published at IPR in 1940.

== Occupation of Japan ==
At the end of the war, policy circles debated what course the United States should pursue in the Occupation of Japan. The historian Howard Schonberger wrote that Bisson "recognized that the war had shattered the hold of the old order, fanned revolutionary fires, and left the United States alone as the dominant outside power in the region." Bisson strongly opposed the group in the State Department known as the "Japan Crowd," led by a former ambassador to Japan, Joseph Grew. It urged the occupation to purge right-wing elements that had been responsible for the war but to allow the Emperor to remain on the throne to lead democratic forces, which would shorten the length of the occupation. Grew's view assumed that militarists and extremists had derailed a viable Japanese democracy but that it could be put back on track after the war.

Bisson drew on the arguments of his friend E.H. Norman, who had written that on the contrary, Japanese authoritarian rule and imperialist expansion had started with the Meiji Restoration in 1868. Bisson opposed keeping the emperor on the throne, unlike Grew, who thought that the emperor would maintain stability.

Bisson and his friends proposed to eradicate the zaibatsu, the conglomerates that had dominated the economy and supported military rule. Instead, he argued in Pacific Affairs that the new leadership must include men and women who had led unions and farm organizations that had opposed the government; most of them had been imprisoned in 1941.

After two years with IPR, Bisson moved back into government service and served from October 1945 to April 1947 in the occupation of Japan, which was led by General Douglas MacArthur. Bisson was first a member of the United States Strategic Bombing Survey and then an economic analyst for General Headquarters's Government Section.

He was part of the teams working on the dissolution of the zaibatsu, passing the new Japanese Constitution, and enforcing the economic stabilization plan. He came to believe that the leaders of the postwar Japanese governments were reactionaries who opposed both the democratic features of the constitution and the dissolution of the zaibatsu. Those beliefs brought him in conflict with MacArthur and Major General Charles A. Willoughby, the head of MacArthur's security investigation, who charged that Bisson had been part of the "leftist infiltration" of the occupation.

== Later life ==
With backing from his associates at IPR, he received an appointment in Political Science at the University of California at Berkeley in 1948. However, because Bisson had never completed his doctorate, his faculty appointment was temporary, subject to periodic review. He soon came under attack from Republican politicians inside and outside California for his sympathy for the CCP. Bisson was called to testify in 1952 before the Senate Internal Security Subcommittee, chaired by Senator Patrick McCarran, who had investigated the Foreign Service officers known as the China Hands.

Bisson used his experience in Japan for another book published by IPR, Prospects for Democracy in Japan and for the major work of his Berkeley years, Zaibatsu Dissolution in Japan. The review in American Political Science Review praised Bisson's ability to tell a technical story clearly and said the book was a "thorough piece of research based on English language sources." However, the review continued that Bisson "enters a controversial field" when he argues that the zaibatsu should be nationalized. The review noted that the Bisson gave both the advantages and disadvantages of nationalization. However, objected to Bisson's argument that nationalization would be successful since it was based on Japanese collectivistic social patterns, as shown in the success of the railroad and communications systems, which had been nationalized for many years.

Bisson remained at Berkeley through 1953-1954, but his appointment was not renewed, perhaps because the administration was defending only tenured faculty from political attack. He finally found employment at Western College for Women, a religious college in Oxford, Ohio, and he "never again," in the words of historian Howard Schonberger, "had the time or the facilities for further major research." Bisson spoke out politically from time to time and was an adamant opponent of the Vietnam War.

He then moved to Renison University College, the affiliated college of University of Waterloo that emphasizes social and global engagement, where he taught from 1970 to 1973.

Bisson died in 1979.

== Espionage allegations ==
The Venona Transcripts were a set of intercepts of Soviet communications made by American government intelligence services during World War II. The translated transcripts include a report to Soviet intelligence that Bisson shared four documents with Asia specialists at IPR, including Joseph Bernstein, who was an agent of the Soviet Union. The documents came from the Board of Economic Warfare. The scholar M. Stanton Evans, in his book Blacklisted by History: The Untold Story of Senator Joe McCarthy and His Fight against America's Enemies, cites Venona documents reading that a "Soviet espionage agent has established friendly relations with T.A. Bisson" and concluded that Bisson "not only touted the cause of the Red Chinese" but "passed confidential official data to a Soviet intelligence agent." The historians John Earl Haynes and Harvey Klehr go farther. They conclude from the fact that Soviet intelligence mentioned Bisson by name and gave him the code name "Arthur" that he was a "spy."

== Selected works ==
- Bisson, T. A. (1929). The Nanking Government. New York: Foreign policy association.
- ——— (1930). The Crisis in India: Its Constitutional Basis. New York: Foreign Policy Association.
- ——— (1930). Democracy in Japan. New York: Foreign Policy Association.
- ——— (1930). The Re-Orientation of Japan 'S Foreign Policy. New York: Foreign Policy Association.
- ——— (1930). Reconstruction in China. New York: Foreign Policy Association.
- ——— (1931). An Autonomous India: The Administrative Issues. New York: Foreign Policy Association.
- ——— (1931). Basic Treaty Issues in Manchuria between Japan and China. New York: Foreign Policy Association.
- ——— (1931). The Military Problem in India. New York: Foreign Policy Association.
- ——— (1932). Japan and Manchoukuo. New York: Foreign Policy Association.
- ——— (1932). Railway Rivalries in Manchuria between China and Japan. New York: Foreign Policy Association.
- ——— (1932). The Rise of Fascism in Japan. New York: Foreign Policy Association.
- ——— (1933). The Communist Movement in China. New York: Foreign Policy Association.
- ——— (1933). Constitutional Developments in India. New York: Foreign Policy Association.
- ——— (1933). Ten Years of the Kuomintang; Revolution Vs. Reaction. New York: Foreign Policy Association.
- ——— (1934). The Dismemberment of China. New York: Foreign Policy Association.
- ——— (1934). Japan's Trade Expansion. New York: Foreign Policy Association.
- ——— (1934). The New Status in the Pacific. New York: Foreign Policy Association.
- ——— (1935). A New Constitution for India. New York: Foreign Policy Association.
- ——— (1935). Outer Mongolia : A New Danger Zone in the Far East. New York: Foreign Policy Association.
- ——— (1935). The Trend toward Dictatorship in Japan. New York: Foreign Policy Association.
- ——— (1936). Japan's Trade Boom. Does It Menace the United States?. New York: Foreign Policy Association.
- ——— (1936). Struggle of the Powers in China. New York: Foreign Policy Association.
- ——— (1936). Clash in the Pacific. New York: Foreign Policy Assoc., Grosset & Dunlap.
- ——— (1937). American Policy in the Far East. New York: Foreign Policy Association.
- ——— (1938). Japan in China. New York: Macmillan (reprint Thorndike Press, 2007). ISBN 1-4067-2283-9.
- ——— (1938). Japan's Home Front. New York: Foreign policy association.
- ——— (1938). Origins of the Sino-Japanese Hostilities. New York: Foreign Policy Association.
- ——— (1939). Japan's Economic Outlook. New York: Foreign Policy Association.
- ——— (1939). Japan's Position in the War Crisis. New York: Foreign Policy Association.
- ——— (1939). Soviet-Japanese Relations: 1931-1938. New York: Foreign Policy Association, Inc.
- ——— (1940). American Policy in the Far East, 1931-1940. New York: International Secretariat, Institute of Pacific Relations.
- ——— (1940). America's Dilemma in the Far East. New York: Foreign Policy Association.
- ——— (1940). Indo-China: Spearhead of Japan's Southward Drive. New York: Foreign Policy Association.
- ——— (1940). Showdown in the Orient. New York: Foreign Policy Association.
- ——— (1941). China's National Front; Problems and Policies. New York: Foreign Policy Association.
- ——— (1941). Japan's "New Structure,". New York: Foreign policy association.
- ——— (1941). The Netherlands Indies at War. New York: Foreign Policy Association.
- ——— (1941). Shadow over Asia; the Rise of Militant Japan. New York: The Foreign Policy Association.
- ——— (1941). American Policy in the Far East, 1931-1941. New York: International secretariat, Institute of Pacific relations.
- ———; Vera Micheles Dean; Albert Randle Elliott; Louis E. Frechtling (1942). The United States at War. New York, N.Y.: Foreign policy association.
- ——— (1944a). "Japan as a Political Organism". Pacific Affairs. 17 (4): 392–420. doi:10.2307/2751882. JSTOR 2751882.
- ——— (1944b). "The Price of Peace for Japan". Pacific Affairs. 17 (1): 5–25. doi:10.2307/2751993. JSTOR 2751993.
- ——— (1945). America's Far Eastern Policy. New York: International Secretariat, Institute of Pacific Relations, distributed by the Macmillan Co.
- ——— (1945). Japan's War Economy. New York: International secretariat, Institute of Pacific relations, distributed by the Macmillan company.
- ——— (1949). Prospects for Democracy in Japan. New York: Macmillan.
- ——— (1954). Zaibatsu Dissolution in Japan. Berkeley: University of California Press.
- ——— (1973). Yenan in June 1937: Talks with the Communist Leaders. Berkeley: Center for Chinese Studies. ISBN 0912966122.

== Sources ==
- Evans, M. Stanton (2007). Blacklisted by History: The Untold Story of Senator Joe McCarthy and His Fight against America's Enemies. New York: Crown Forum. ISBN 9781400081066.
- Schonberger, Howard B. (1989). Aftermath of War: Americans and the Remaking of Japan, 1945-1952. Kent, Ohio: Kent State University Press. ISBN 0873383699.
- Schonberger, Howard B. (1980). "Thomas Arthur Bisson and the Limits of Reform in Occupied Japan" (PDF). Bulletin of Concerned Asian Scholars. 12 (4): 26–37. doi:10.1080/14672715.1980.10405228.
