= Cliff Kincaid =

American writer and activist (born 1954)

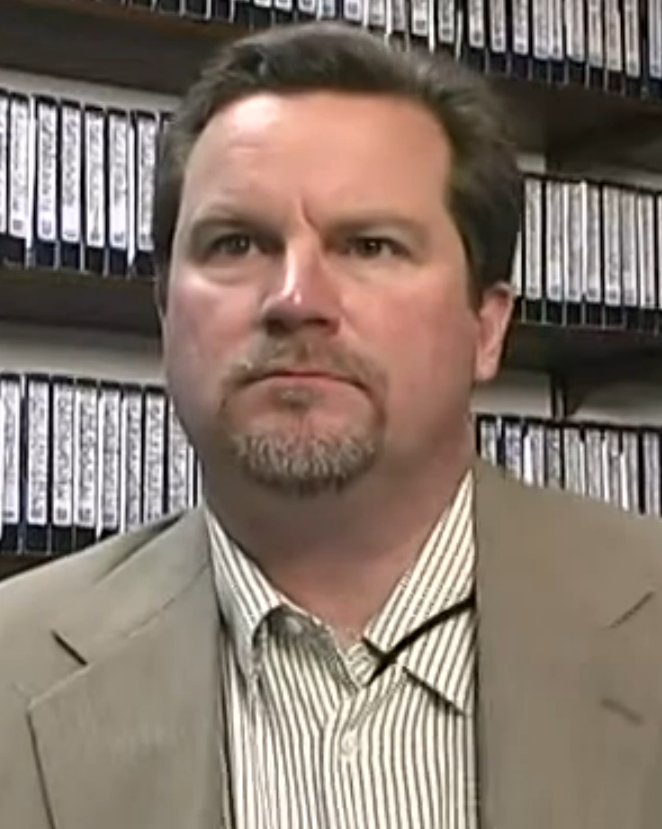
- Kincaid in 2004
- Born: Clifford P. Kincaid Jr. May 16, 1954 (age 72)
- Education: University of Toledo (BA)
- Occupation: Political activist

Clifford "Cliff" P. Kincaid Jr. (born May 16, 1954) is an American author and conservative political activist. Previously, he was the director of the Center for Investigative Journalism of Accuracy in Media, an organization which believes much of the American news media is biased toward liberal candidates and policy positions. Kincaid has written for such publications as Human Events.

== Background ==
Kincaid graduated with a Bachelor of Arts in journalism and communications from the University of Toledo in Toledo, Ohio. At his college newspaper, he won an award for editorial writing from the Society of Professional Journalists. Kincaid came to Washington, D.C., through the National Journalism Center headed by the late conservative author M. Stanton Evans. In addition to his work with A. I. M., Kincaid is the president of American Survival, Inc., a 501 (c) (3) organization for stated "educational" purposes, based in Owings, Maryland.

== Accuracy in media ==
In November 2005, Kincaid, as the representative for Accuracy in Media, criticized the Fox News channel for the broadcast, The Heat is On, which reported, with a disclaimer, the threat of global warming. Kincaid argued that the program was one-sided and likened the broadcast to a "hostile takeover of Fox News" by the environmental lobby.

Kincaid is a longtime critic of the Southern Poverty Law Center in Montgomery, Alabama. According to the SPLC, Kincaid "masquerades as a media watchdog, [but] is actually an unrepentant propagandist for extremist right-wing causes who knows few boundaries in his attempts to smear liberal foes".

Kincaid discounts the existence of gay conservatives, but claims "there is a homosexual movement that has its roots in Marxism and is characterized by anti-Americanism and hatred of Christian values."

He has been on the board of advisors of Stop Islamization of Nations, which has described him as a "leader of the struggle to keep the jihadist propaganda network Al-Jazeera off American airwaves." He was a speaker at the World Freedom Congress event of the organization's "counter-jihadist" activists on September 11, 2012.

On June 14, 2016, after the Orlando nightclub shooting, Kincaid penned the article "Why Obama Gets Emotional Talking about Islam." This report claims that under President Barack Obama "the religion of a suspect is NOT to be judged or pursued when questions emerge about Muslims having links to terrorism. [...] [This] presidential approach [...] has cost many lives in Orlando and puts more lives at risk in the nation at large".

== Television appearances ==
Kincaid sometimes substituted for co-host Pat Buchanan in the late 1980s on the former CNN television series, Crossfire, which offered debate on liberal v. conservative topics. He has appeared on The Today Show on NBC, the CBS Evening News, Hannity & Colmes, The O'Reilly Factor, Lou Dobbs Tonight, and The Glenn Beck Show.

== Kincaid's books ==
- The News Manipulators: Why You Can't Trust the News, with Reed Irvine (founder of A. I. M.) and Joseph C. Goulden, ISBN 0-9625053-1-5 (1993)
- Why You Can't Trust the News, with Deborah Lambert, Reed Irvine, and Notra Trulock, ISBN 0-9676658-1-7 (2003)
- Why You Can't Trust the News, Part II, with Roger Aronoff and Don Irvine, ISBN 0-9676658-4-1 (2007)
- Global Bondage, Huntington House, ISBN 1-56384-103-7 (1995)
- Global Taxes for World Government, ISBN 1-56384-125-8 (1997)
- Michael New: Mercenary or American Soldier?, with Daniel New, ASIN B007ZHOPLG (1999 and 2012)
- The Death of Talk Radio? ISBN 0-9676658-7-6 (2007)
- Introduction to All the Dupes Fit to Print: Journalists Who Have Served as Tools of Communist Propaganda by Paul Kengor, ASIN B00FASY02G (2013)
- Back from the Dead: The Return of the Evil Empire, with Konstantin Preobrazhensky, J. R. Nyquist, and Toby Westerman, ASIN B00MHGG784 (2014)
- Blood on His Hands: The True Story of Edward Snowden, a look at Edward Snowden, who copied and leaked classified information from the National Security Agency in 2013. ASIN B00TO2TRF4 (2015)
- Global Bondage: The UN Plan to Rule the World, ASIN B00TWPONZ2 (2015)
- The Sword of Revolution and the Communist Apocalypse, ASIN B0159A7DRS (2015)
- Red Jihad: Moscow's Final Solution for America and Israel, with J. R. Nyquist, ASIN B01BNSZ8RC (2016)
- The New United Nations' Welfare Giveaway: Trillion Dollar Boondoggle to Hit U.S. Taxpayers, ISBN 0-9704070-0-9 (2016).
