= Young Americans for Freedom =

Conservative youth organization

- Abbreviation: YAF
- Formation: September 11, 1960
- Type: Educational youth organization
- Legal status: 501(c)(3) nonprofit organization
- Purpose: Conservative activism
- Region served: United States
- Executive Director: Kyle Ferrebee
- National Chairman: Grant Strobl
- Affiliations: Young America's Foundation; National Journalism Center; The Reagan Ranch
- Website: https://yaf.org/chapters/

Young Americans for Freedom (YAF) is an American conservative youth educational activism organization that was founded in 1960 as a coalition between traditional conservatives and libertarians on U.S. college campuses. It is a 501(c)(3) nonprofit organization and the chapter affiliate of Young America's Foundation. The purposes of YAF are to advocate public policies consistent with the Sharon Statement, which was adopted by young conservatives at a meeting at the home of William F. Buckley in Sharon, Connecticut on September 11, 1960.

While the 1960s were its most successful years in terms of numbers and influence, YAF has experienced a resurgence in campus mobilization during the 2020s, becoming active as a national organization with chapters on college and high school campuses throughout the United States. YAF's official publication is The New Guard.

== History ==
=== Early years ===
Historians have documented the volatility inside YAF during its early years as a coalition of conservatives and libertarians. Kenneth Heineman writes, "YAF itself suffered internal strife. In 1969 the organization split into competing, irreconcilable factions." Gregory L. Schneider states, "In the mid-1970s YAF suffered from weak leadership based on factions and personalities rather than ability". Jerome Tuccile writes, "The second faction of rebels consisted of radical libertarians or anarchists, most of them belonging to Karl Hess's son Karl Hess IV's Anarcho-libertarian Alliance. This contingent was more interested in splitting off from YAF entirely." Rebecca E. Klatch writes, "When one young libertarian burned his draft card on the convention floor, the crowd turned into an angry mob and, ultimately, purged all libertarians from YAF. One libertarian faction stormed out of the meeting." Lauren Lassabe Shepherd describes YAF members as "United by anticommunism, Christian moralism, and disdain for bureaucracy and planned economies".

=== National conservative activism, 1960-1965 ===
In September 1960, about 90 young people met at the childhood home of William F. Buckley Jr. in Sharon, Connecticut. They gathered to lay the groundwork for a new national conservative youth organization. It is here that Young Americans for Freedom was born and their statement of principles, the Sharon Statement, was drafted. The New Guard magazine made its debut as the official magazine of YAF in 1961. In the first four years of its existence, YAF grew rapidly on college campuses.

Ronald Reagan joined the YAF National Advisory Board in 1962 and for 42 years served as its Honorary Chairman.

In the 1960s, the Republican Party was divided between its conservative wing, led by Barry Goldwater, and its more liberal wing, led by Nelson Rockefeller. YAF members fell squarely on Goldwater's side and spearheaded the campaign of Barry Goldwater for president.

On March 7, 1962, a YAF-sponsored conservative rally filled Madison Square Garden in New York City, drawing 18,000 people. In attendance was Barry Goldwater. The event has been described as "the birthday of the conservative movement."

The second national YAF convention was held in 1963 at the Gault Hotel in Florida. With over 450 voting delegates in attendance. Hotel management at the Gault Hotel refused accommodations to Don Parker, an African-American delegate from Brooklyn. As word of this spread around the YAFers in attendance, a number of delegates and numerous others began gathering in the lobby of the hotel demanding that either the Gault Hotel allow all the black YAFers to stay and the hotel change its segregation policy or YAF would move the convention to another site. However, Black membership has always been exceptional in YAF and many of the organization's national board members have been outspoken segregationists, including Strom Thurmond, William Colmer, and L. Mendel Rivers.

By 1964, YAF was a major force in the campaign to nominate Goldwater, and then after his nomination, to elect him president. Goldwater's run for the White House catalyzed YAF more than any other event in its history. Lee Edwards, former New Guard editor, said "Barry Goldwater made YAF, but YAF also made Barry Goldwater." Goldwater's massive defeat in the presidential election of 1964 demoralized many YAF members.

In YAF's campaign to "STOP RED TRADE", IBM, Mack Truck, and Firestone Tire and Rubber were targeted for engaging in high visibility trade with the Soviet Bloc. As part of a wave of America First boycotts, YAF claimed that it stopped Firestone's attempt to build a synthetic rubber plant in communist Romania through letter-writing campaigns, boycotts, and demonstrations. YAF also claimed their plan to distribute 500,000 flyers at the Indianapolis 500 was key to the decision by Firestone executives to cancel their Romanian plans in April 1965.

In September 1965, the YAF announced plans to hold a memorial honoring three Russian Nazi collaborators from the Russian Liberation Army, who'd committed suicide on June 29, 1945, to avoid repatriation to the Soviet Union. The memorial was cancelled after protests by Ralph Plofsky, the commander of the Jewish War Veterans of the United States of America.

YAF faced opposition from groups like the American Nazi Party because of the presence of Jews in the organization and its close relationship with Marvin Liebman. However, YAF did honor Senator from South Carolina Strom Thurmond, a segregationist, with its Freedom Award in 1962. Several YAF members campaigned for segregationist George Wallace for president in 1968, forming an auxiliary Youth for Wallace movement, which later became the National Youth Alliance and the American Nazi Party. An unsubstantiated claim has been made that a YAF member was involved with the 'Welcome Mr. Kennedy to Dallas' ad placed in the Dallas Morning News (coincidentally on the morning of JFK's assassination), which accused him of ignoring the Constitution.

=== Reaction to radical activism, 1965-1971 ===
Liberalism and radicalism dominated campuses from the mid-1960s until the early 1970s, primarily as a result of the civil rights movement and the Vietnam War. Though outnumbered, YAF went on the offensive against radical left-wing organizations by challenging and rebutting civil rights groups like the Afro-American Society and W.E.B. DuBois clubs, as well as antiwar groups like Students for a Democratic Society (SDS) and New MOBE in support of a U.S. victory in Vietnam.

YAF members tended to hold similar opinions to their older compatriots within the conservative movement, including members of their advisory board such as Strom Thurmond, John Tower, L. Mendel Rivers, and William Colmer. YAF began and continued a number of projects to support Vietnam veterans and their causes. "Project Appreciation" gave YAFers the opportunity to write, visit, and provide needed supplies to hospitalized veterans. YAF worked on various POW/MIA issues. In a protest in Santa Monica in 1979, the YAF focused protests and a personal attack on Jane Fonda by hanging an effigy of her outside her house due to her opposition to the Vietnam War. YAF often made protests appearances at Fonda events, getting in physical altercations with her security guards and mocking her peace activism and acting career by holding up banners that read, "Barbarella bombed, why can't Nixon?" and "Shoot Fonda, not film!"

A faction of YAF philosophically extended the group's traditional support of limited government in economic issues to social issues and a foreign policy of non-interventionism. This group came to be known as libertarians. A more serious and lasting challenge for YAF came from this group, those who believed in limited or even no government – radical libertarians and anarchists. YAF's Libertarian and Anarchist Caucuses were purged at the YAF's 1969 national convention in St. Louis, and members of this faction were among the founding members of the Libertarian Party in 1971.

=== Advocacy politics, 1971-1985 ===
In the 1970s, rather than merely staging campus demonstrations, YAF focused on influencing national politics by lobbying and occasionally staging and publicizing small demonstrations. YAF went on the offensive when President Nixon enacted wage controls, price controls, abandoned the gold standard, and opened relations with the communist People's Republic of China, ceasing relations with Taiwan. YAF felt he was abandoning conservative principles so YAF publicly denounced the administration for these moves, becoming the first conservative organization to do so.

In 1974, YAF, along with the American Conservative Union, sponsored a modest and ambitious gathering called the Conservative Political Action Conference (CPAC). CPAC has become the largest annual gathering of conservatives and is still held annually in the Washington, D.C. area.

On college campuses, YAF was more conservative and less partisan than the College Republicans. Members were willing to oppose liberal candidates and support conservative candidates regardless of party affiliation. During many local and national races throughout this era, YAF members were divided about whether to support a moderately conservative electable candidate or to support a staunchly conservative long-shot candidate.

YAF supported Reagan's almost-successful bid to win the Republican presidential nomination in 1976 and his victorious race for the presidency in 1980. YAFers around the nation mobilized in support of Reagan's agenda.

Many YAFers received appointments to the Reagan Administration. Reagan Administration officials and prospective appointees who were targeted by the radical left were strongly defended by YAF. YAFers rallied to the support of Labor Secretary Raymond Donovan, Interior Secretary James Watt, Circuit Court Judge Dan Manion, Supreme Court nominee Robert Bork, and NSC staff member Lt. Colonel Oliver North.

By the mid-1980s, many of YAF's leaders were in their thirties and long out of college. Some of them held positions in government while continuing to run the organization as a lobbying and fund-raising group for conservative causes. At the same time, internal problems paralyzed the YAF hierarchy. The national board was controlled by lawyers and lobbyists who focused on fundraising. This era ended with financial problems which led to YAF losing most of its assets.

=== Campus activism, 1985-1991 ===
After a financial collapse, most of the older members went on to other things, while younger members dominated YAF. During this era, a new generation of liberal and radical activism was growing on college campuses, and members began focusing on opposing these movements. This growth was strongest in California, where members staged protests in favor of aid to the Nicaraguan Contras, in favor of Reagan's anti-communist policies and in opposition to the United Nations.

The emphasis on campus activism gradually spread to all the states where YAF was still active. In 1989, an alliance of Californian and New York activists took over a majority of the seats on the national board.

In April of 1990, the University of Massachusetts-Amherst YAF branch organized and participated in a "Burn a Fag in Effigy" student rally. The event was repeated for Conservative Awareness Week in March of 1991 as a "straight pride demonstration", which was attended by about 50 people and protested by a crowd of approximately 500 people.

=== Rebuilding years, 1991-1999 ===
Though the presence of National YAF was lax during the 1990s as they were focusing on revitalizing and rebuilding the organization, there remained very active pockets of YAF activity throughout the country, campus charters and statewide units that organized and operated on their own. California YAF continued as a strong conservative force on campuses and in that state's political arena. Many states like Florida, Massachusetts, Michigan, Pennsylvania, New York, Virginia and others still had very active individual campus chapters.

By 1991, the national board of YAF contained a majority of Californians – the first time a single state had had a majority in the governing council. However, this new régime found itself unable to effectively run YAF as a financial and organizational entity. The strength of its activism was shattered by the Gulf War that began in January 1991. Most members considered President George H. W. Bush to be insufficiently conservative, and his rhetoric justifying the war – "a new world order" – to be dangerously utopian. While conservative-oriented students on campuses around the country were showing support for the American effort against Saddam Hussein's invasion of Kuwait, many YAF leaders of the time were expressing opposition to the war effort. Thus, an opportunity to expand the organization's membership was lost.

In August 1991, YAF held its 16th National Convention in Washington D.C. YAF members from around the country gathered to reaffirm its commitment to conservative principles and heard such speakers as William F. Buckley, Jr., Secretary of Defense Dick Cheney, and G. Gordon Liddy. The following year, YAF National Chairman Jeff Wright met with Vice President Dan Quayle and delivered over 40,000 petitions in support of his renomination as vice president. YAF launched an Anita Hill Truth Squad and YAFers confronted Anita Hill on college campuses across America. YAF pushed the 1992 Republican National Convention to continue strong support for conservative issues.

At the 1995 Conservative Political Action Conference, YAF held a "Colloquium on Revolution." Young Americans for Freedom members rallied around speakers such as YAF founding elder Howard Phillips, Congressman Robert Dornan, Joseph Sobran, and other speakers motivating the young crowds to continue YAF's conservative charge to preserve freedom and individual liberty. In 1996, National chairman Jon Pastore led a delegation of YAFers to bring national attention to a group called the North American Man/Boy Love Association (NAMBLA). NAMBLA members got quite a surprise at one of their events in Washington DC in 1996 when YAFers held banners warning the effects of 'deviant and un-natural sexual practices.'

In 1997, Brian Park, National Director and state Chairman of California YAF, organized support for the rights of American Indians when their tribal sovereignty was being encroached upon by Governor Pete Wilson. Later in the 1990s, YAF returned to national advocacy politics. The national office organized petition drives and staged a variety of events to promote the conservative viewpoint on a variety of public issues. Some of these events would have an attention-grabbing theme such as "Pardon Oliver North" and "Impeach Janet Reno".

=== Resurgence, 2000-2010 ===
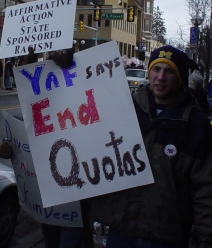
Members of the University of Michigan YAF Chapter protest affirmative action in Ann Arbor, Michigan. This picture appeared on the national YAF organization's website banner.

In 2007, the YAF chapter at Michigan State University organized protests against legislation enacting anti-discrimination protection for transgender individuals. Ten years later, Grant Strobl, YAF's national chairman, said the Michigan State chapter was not chartered and had associated itself with YAF without authorization.

Beginning in 2009, Young Americans for Freedom has organized a number of new college chapters to supplement the long-standing units on campuses such as Penn State. On college campuses, YAF chapters have been involved in activities including sponsoring conservative speakers, rallies supporting the armed forces, advocacy of strict control of illegal immigration, demonstrations against affirmative action and protesting liberal campus speakers.

In 2009, YAF, a coalition of Tea Party groups, retired police and firefighter association, and Keep America Safe hosted the "9/11 Never Forget" Rally in New York City.

=== Modern history, 2010-present ===
On March 16, 2011, Young Americans for Freedom passed National Board Resolution #001, unifying the Young America's Foundation with Young Americans for Freedom on April 1, 2011. Young America's Foundation provides students with speakers, activism programs, conferences and opportunities to learn about Ronald Reagan's accomplishments by visiting his beloved ranch, Rancho del Cielo, in Santa Barbara, California. Young America's Foundation has brought speakers like Ben Shapiro and David Horowitz to College Republican groups across the United States, as well as to broader university venues.

As of May 16, 2011, Young Americans for Freedom officially became a project of Young America's Foundation. The existing board members of Young Americans for Freedom, at the time of the unification, became part of a newly formed board of governors. Existing YAF chapters were brought under the auspices of the Foundation.

According to the New York Times, organizations like YAF were largely displaced in campus conservatism by the rise of Turning Point USA in the 2010s and 2020s.

== Influence ==
From its beginning as an outgrowth of the efforts to obtain the Republican vice-presidential nomination for a conservative in 1960 to its determined campaign to ensure that a conservative vice-president (Dan Quayle) was renominated in 1992, YAF was a major player in late 20th century American politics.

Karl Zinsmeister wrote the following about YAF:

The conservative activists who first organized themselves [through YAF] in the early 1960s were the force behind the rise of Barry Goldwater, the election of Ronald Reagan as Governor of California, the takeover of the Republican Party from the liberal wing that controlled it for decades, the election of Ronald Reagan as president, and the reversion of Congress to Republican control for the first time in 40 years.

Although YAF members and chapters were engaged in many projects to influence public policy and elect conservative candidates to office, the leadership of the organization was well aware that their goals and objectives were more long-term. YAF was recruiting, training and preparing young people to assume even more important roles later in life. YAF spawned many of the organizational elements of the 21st-century conservative movement and provided the leadership and manpower to build those publications, organizations, and foundations into the significant elements of American society that they are today.

== Role in the conservative movement ==
YAF played a critical role in the development of many of the new conservative organizations that were established in the 1960s, 1970s, and beyond. Many college students and young adults active in YAF went on to form new groups or serve as important personnel in conservative organizations founded by others.

=== Conservative or libertarian organizations ===
Conservative or libertarian organizations YAF members founded or in which they played an important contributing role include:

- American Conservative Union – founded in 1964 – William F. Buckley, David R. Jones & others.
- The Fund for American Studies – founded in 1966 – David R. Jones, Charles Edison, Dr. Walter Judd, Marvin Liebman and William F. Buckley Jr.
- The American Spectator – founded in 1967 – Publisher Alfred S. Regnery; Editor-in-Chief R. Emmett Tyrrell, Jr. (both YAF alumni)
- Reason Foundation – founded in 1968 – Robert W. Poole Jr.
- Conservative Victory Fund – founded in 1969 – Congressman John Ashbrook & Tom Winter.
- Young America's Foundation – founded in 1969 – Students at Vanderbilt University, Ron Robinson (YAF) & others
- The Libertarian Party of America – founded in 1971 – David Nolan
- American Legislative Exchange Council – founded in 1973 – Kathy King Rothschild, assisted by Connie Campanella.
- Conservative Political Action Conference – started in 1974 – Young Americans for Freedom, American Conservative Union, Human Events & National Review
- The Conservative Caucus – founded in 1974 – Howard Phillips
- The Second Amendment Foundation – founded in 1974 – Alan Gotlieb; Treasurer Sam Slom, Hawaii State Senator and YAF alumnus
- The National Journalism Center – founded in 1977 – M. Stanton Evans
- Cato Institute – founded in 1977 – David Boaz
- The Lincoln Institute for Research and Education – founded in 1978 – Jay A. Parker
- The Leadership Institute – founded in 1979 – Morton Blackwell
- Young Conservatives of Texas – founded in 1980 – Steve Munisteri
- The Ludwig von Mises Institute – founded in 1982 – Lewellyn Rockwell
- The National Center for Public Policy Research – founded in 1982 – Amy Moritz Ridenour.
- The Institute for Policy Innovation – founded in 1987 – Peter Ferrara
- The Media Research Center – founded in 1987 – L. Brent Bozell III & Brent Baker
- Citizens United – founded in 1988 – Floyd Brown
- The American Policy Center – founded in 1988 – Tom DeWeese
- The Goldwater Institute – founded in 1988 – Dr. Michael Sanera
- The National Legal and Policy Center – founded in 1991 – Kenneth Boehm
- Clare Boothe Luce Policy Institute – founded in 1993 – Michelle Easton
- The Thomas Jefferson Institute – founded in *** – Michael Thompson, Chris Braulich, Randal C. Teague & Robert Turner.
- Grasstops USA – founded in 2004 – Christoper Carmouche

=== Notable alumni ===
==== In public office ====
- U.S. President Ronald Reagan, former YAF Honorary National Chairman
- U.S. Vice President Dan Quayle
- U.S. Attorney General Jeff Sessions
- Former U.S. Senator and U.S. Court of Appeals Judge James Buckley
- U.S. Representative Dana Rohrabacher
- U.S. Representative Ed Royce
- U.S. Representative James Sensenbrenner
- U.S. Representative Ted Poe
- U.S. Representative Peter King
- U.S. Representative Chuck Fleischmann
- U.S. Representative Jeb Hensarling
- U.S. Representative Donald Manzullo
- U.S. Representative Jimmy Duncan
- U.S. Representative Robert E. Bauman, YAF Chairman, ACU founder and national chairman
- Securities and Exchange Commission Chairman and U.S. Representative Christopher Cox
- U.S. Circuit Court Judges Daniel A. Manion, Alice M. Batchelder, Jerry Edwin Smith, David B. Sentelle, Danny Boggs, Randall Rader, Diarmuid O'Scannlain, and Paul V. Niemeyer
- California legislator Pat Nolan, former California chairman
- Former Louisiana State Representative Woody Jenkins

==== In the conservative movement ====
- David Keene, Opinion Editor of The Washington Times, Former President of National Rifle Association and former Chairman of American Conservative Union
- David J. Porter of Giddings, Texas, Railroad Commission of Texas
- James Bopp Jr., Attorney and Republican National Committeeman from Indiana
- Dr. Lee Edwards, Historian, founding YAF member and founding editor of YAF's New Guard Magazine
- M. Stanton Evans, YAF founder and writer
- Richard Viguerie, Fundraiser, founder of direct mail marketing, and YAF's first executive director
- Deroy Murdock, Syndicated columnist
- Mark Levin, Syndicated talk-show host
- Katie Pavlich, Journalist

== Philosophy ==
Since its founding, YAF continuously identified itself as "conservative". However, the term "conservative" has changed in meaning over several generations. Before World War II, most American conservatives were non-interventionist. But as the Cold War began to dominate American foreign policy, the old conservatism disintegrated. After Robert A. Taft was defeated for the Republican nomination in 1952, non-interventionist conservatism mostly vanished. In the 1950s, a new kind of conservatism arose. This new ideology was formulated in large part by the newspaper Human Events, the magazine National Review, and its editor William F. Buckley Jr. This new conservatism combined free-market economics, respect for traditional values, orderly society and anti-communism.

In the late 1960s, the term libertarianism began to be used for a political philosophy. Many of those who popularized this term were initially part of the conservative movement, but came to separate themselves from the conservatives on certain issues. Libertarians within YAF believed, for example, the military draft was a violation of the individual freedom the organization claimed to embrace. To oppose, it they were willing to reject existing laws against burning draft cards and supported those who fled to Canada or went underground when drafted for military service. The conservatives (or traditionalists as they were sometimes called) also opposed the draft directed their efforts towards changing the law. In the end, the goals of both groups were achieved, and YAF was "in the forefront of the drive to end the draft and create a volunteer military."

After 1969, the relationship between conservatives and libertarians in YAF was often rocky. A majority of members identified themselves simply as conservative, but some identified as both conservative and libertarian, and still others identified themselves simply as libertarian. From time to time, power struggles broke out; when this happened, the libertarians almost always ended up losing. In later years, new viewpoints would be amalgamated by the conservative movement, including neoconservatism in the early 1970s, the New Right in the late 1970s and the Religious Right in the 1980s. Some YAF members identified with some of these philosophies, others opposed them and still others were content to simply identify themselves as conservative without further specificity.
