= Donald J. Devine =

American political scientist and advisor

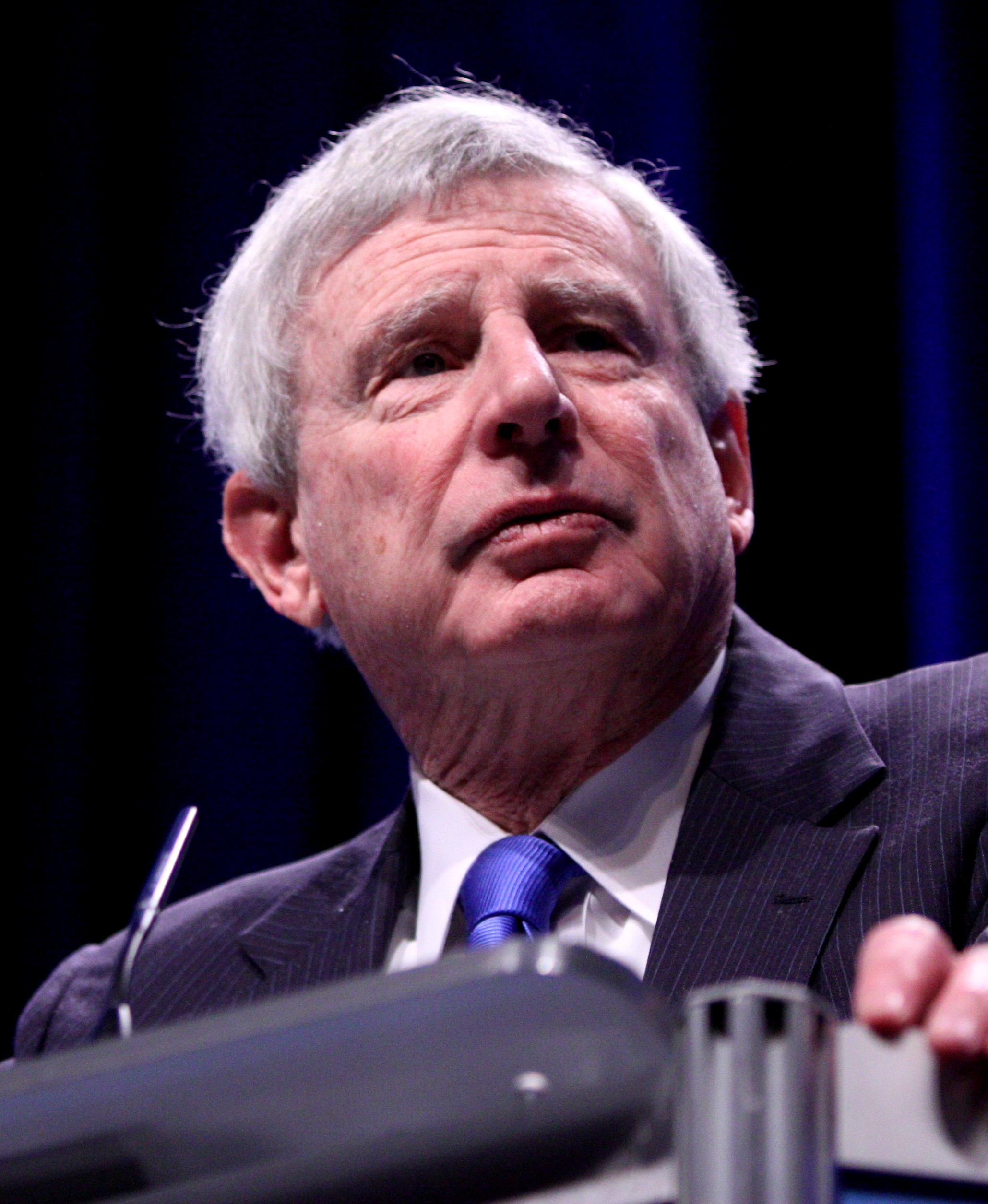
Devine at the 2011 Conservative Political Action Conference

Donald J. Devine (born 1937) is an American political scientist and former government official, who has popularized fusionism as taught by Frank Meyer. He is associated to The Fund for American Studies and The Heritage Foundation. He is also a trustee of the Philadelphia Society.

Devine served as the Office of Personnel Management director of Ronald Reagan's first administration. During his tenure, he helped cut 100,000 federal jobs, and over $6 billion in benefits. He was labeled by The Washington Post as a "terrible swift sword of the civil service", by The New York Times as "the Grinch", and by Federal Times as the "Rasputin of the reduction in force".

Devine taught government and politics at the University of Maryland, and Western civilization at Bellevue University. He has written more than ten libertarian conservative books, and was a contributor to Project 2025.

== Personal life ==
Donald Devine was born in Bronxville, New York to Frances Phelan Devine and John Devine. He was raised by his mother in his grandfather Frank Phelan's home in Brooklyn and educated at Catholic schools in New York. He is married to Ann Della Smith, with whom he had four children.

Devine graduated from St. John's University New York with a B.B.A. in management and economics in 1959. He was granted an MA in political science from Brooklyn College City University of New York in 1965. He earned a Ph.D. in political science from the Maxwell School at Syracuse University in 1967.

He served as a member of the Army Reserve from 1960 to 1966.

== Career ==
=== Academia ===
Devine became assistant professor of Government and Politics at University of Maryland, College Park in 1967, and was granted tenure in 1970, teaching graduate and undergraduate students until 1980. During this period, he earned a National Science Foundation and several University of Maryland research awards for methodological pursuits.

In 2000, Devine was appointed professor of political science at Bellevue University where he served for a decade teaching in the classroom and on line. He co-edited a book of readings on Western Civilization for Bellevue University Press in 2002 to be used as course material.

=== Government ===
In 1981, Devine was appointed by Ronald Reagan and confirmed by the U.S. Senate as Director of the Office of Personnel Management. In this position he was setting personnel policies for 2 million civilian government employees and managing a budget of $30 billion. Devine sought re-appointment in 1985, but withdrew his nomination in the face of opposition; his former deputy told that he requested her to lie to Congress about the nature of his consultant appointment while awaiting reconfirmation.

In the 1980s Devine also served on the Cabinet Council on Management and Administration (1982–1985), the Commission on White House Fellowships (1981–1985), the Council on Integrity and Efficiency (1981–1985), the Commission on Executive Exchange (1981–1987), and the Intergovernmental Advisory Committee on Education (1988–1990).

Devine was an OPM advisor under the first Trump administration.

=== Politics ===
After leaving government, Devine became adviser to Senate Majority Leader Bob Dole from 1988 to 1996. He was fired from the 1988 Dole campaign over a dispute with campaign Chairman William Brock.

From 1998 to 2000, Devine was adviser to Steve Forbes.

As president of Donald Devine Company he has been an adviser to the National Republican Senatorial Committee, the National Republican Congressional Committee and many candidates for political office. He has been a losing Republican nominee in Maryland for a congressional district in 1994 and for state comptroller.

=== Conservative outlets ===
From 1986 to 2000, he maintained a column at The Washington Times.

Since 1992, Devine has produced several research papers for Heritage, primarily on government management issues

In 2004, he launched ConservativeBattleline, a magazine from the American Conservative Union Foundation that sought to challenge the Republican party's drift away from minarchism. In his essay "Reagan's Fusionism Failing?", Devine explained having launched the magazine to rebut the declaration that fusionism was dead.

In 2011 Devine became Senior Scholar at The Fund for American Studies teaching its seminar on the U.S. Constitution to Washington DC interns and introducing a new generation to fusionist philosophy.

In 2015, Devine received the Heartland Liberty Prize.

In 2023, Devine co-authored the chapter on governmental personnel agencies in the Heritage Foundation's Project 2025 book, Mandate for Leadership: The Conservative Promise. He has also contributed to its series of private training videos.

== Political philosophy ==
=== Influence ===
Living in New York and attending St. John's University, Devine was influenced by John Hurley, Charles Crowley, Francis Canavan, William F. Buckley Jr., Frank S. Meyer. Like Meyer he was also influenced by Friedrich Hayek. The Liberty Fund edition of Meyer's major essays lists Devine as among a small group of his followers who most advanced Meyer's version of fusionism which, according to Ronald Reagan, is "recognized by many as modern conservatism."

=== Themes ===
Devine's major thesis has been that the progressive movement against the old Constitutional order had become so successful politically in both political parties over the past century that few Americans now understand their original government and how their Constitution provided the foundation for its historical success. This lack of understanding has produced a profound unease with how government works and explains why society has not responded positively to the changes, provoking a widespread demand for an alternative. There is a general agreement, Devine argues, that something is profoundly wrong and that something about the nation's greatness is being lost. For many, this has meant a turning toward the Constitution and the principles underlying it, which he argues is the only real alternative.

=== Books synopsis ===
Devine summarized fusionism's doctrine in one phrase as "utilizing libertarian means in a conservative society for traditionalist ends." Some type of fusionist solution that unites social and economic conservatism is accepted by most on the American right. But most of these refer to a political fusion rather than a philosophical resolution between the two elements, desiring a coalition of interests rather than seeing a need for a deeper philosophical resolution of both into a synthesis as required by philosophical fusionism as taught by Meyer.

Following Meyer, freedom is viewed as the preeminent political value. The state has only three legitimate functions – police, military and operating a legal system, all necessary to control coercion, which is immoral if not restricted. There is an obligation to others but it is individual, for even the "Great Commandment" is expressed in individual form: God, neighbor and oneself are individual. Freedom must be balanced by responsibility. For freedom by itself has no goal, no intrinsic ends to pursue. Freedom is not abstract or utopian as with the utilitarians, who make freedom an end rather than a means. A utopia of freedom is a contradiction in terms. In a real society traditional order and freedom can only exist together in tension. To retain the essentiality of both freedom and tradition, the solution to the dilemma is "grasping it by both horns" The solution is a synthesis of both, even in the face of those who argue that no such synthesis is possible or even logical.

Devine developed his own version of fusionism in more than ten books.

The Attentive Public: Polyarchical Democracy was Devine's Ph.D. thesis and was selected to be included in the American Politics Research Series, edited by Aaron Wildavsky, who supervised this series devoted to advanced methodological approaches to important aspects of American politics. Arend Lijphart called The Attentive Public "an excellent example of a fresh look at one of the most basic questions in the empirical study of democracy, the relationship between popular demands and outputs." Samuel A. Kirkpatrick said it was "a major contribution to the literature on empirical modifications of democratic theory."

In The Enduring Tension, Devine claims that traditionalism and libertarianism cannot be fused together in the Hegelian sense but could be harmonized through what his fusionist mentor, Frank S. Meyer called a criterion principle where principles can be balanced against each other to account for specific circumstances.

The Political Culture of the United States took the writings of John Locke and The Federalist Papers and related their expectations of popular political culture with what Americans have believed as represented by all of the recorded scientific polls taken by the time of the writing. This book was included as one of the featured books in the Analytical Comparative Politics Series, edited by UCLA. James Danielson labeled it "a valuable piece of synthesizing" of almost all published polls from the 1930s birth of opinion polls to the present. Glenn Parker said it added "appreciably to existing knowledge." Alan Monroe said it was "a thorough examination of American political culture based upon survey data."

Does Freedom Work? is an analytical study expanding earlier work on John Locke and Adam Smith and relating both classical authors to an earlier Western tradition that embraced both that tradition and their ideas about political freedom. The book then applied that political philosophy to that of America's Founders and compared these to empirical aspects of America today.

Devine's government experiences during this period were recorded in his 1991 book Reagan's Terrible Swift Sword: Reforming and Controlling the Federal Bureaucracy The book explained how the Reagan Administration analyzed and reformed the Federal Government against the opposition of its bureaucracy and political establishment.

America's Way Back argued that what is required is an understanding of this profound synthesis underlying the Constitution, reviving its harmony between freedom and tradition, a fusion whose tension has been the lifeblood not merely of the American experience but of all Western Civilization.

Restoring the Tenth Amendment told the story of the "long time movement of American government and politics away from the federalist roots of the Constitution and how this contributed to the inability of the national government to work with so many additional responsibilities assumed from state and local governments and the private sector".

In Defense of the West was adopted as the textbook for the required course in Western civilization. From foreign terrorism to domestic cynicism about its once self-evident truths, this book found Western values and American institutions under siege and asked whether these values could survive or even be defended in a civilization that questions everything?

== Criticisms ==
=== Administrative tenure ===
His primary opposition was from the federal sector unions and executive associations. As a Washington Post feature on him said, he "has overseen the RIF-ing of thousands of federal workers, cut salaries and expense accounts by 8 percent, reduced disability retirements by 40 percent, eliminated abortion coverage from federal health insurance programs, and threatened the automatic merit pay system [plus] the sacred bulwark of the federal employee retirement system [...] He has taken on Congress, unions, federal courts, insurance companies, other government agencies, even his own party."

As a result, "at the mere mention of his name, federal workers grit their teeth and express fear and loathing." Congresswoman Mary Rose Oakar (D-OH) is quoted as saying he was "arrogant, I think he's philosophically intransigent." He was supported by the Wall Street Journal, but with unified Democratic Senate opposition to his re-appointment and two Republicans with large public employee constituencies claiming he exceeded his authority, he was forced to withdraw his nomination.

In promoting a decentralized and political model of administration advanced by Professor Vincent Ostrom, Devine also incurred the opposition of the professional public administration community. Twenty years later he was still being used as a contrarian against the prevailing public administration doctrine. Other public administration scholars noted that Devine's focus on OPM as a political instrument of the executive branch lost the traditional management orientation of OPM. Subsequent directors appointed under President George H. W. Bush (Constance Horner and Constance Newman) returned OPM to its original focus.

=== Philosophical tension ===
Reconciling libertarian and conservative thoughts remains a challenge.

Samuel Francis argued that Devine's fusionism was an unsuccessful attempt to absorb an indivisible traditionalism into pluralist libertarianism.

Nick Gillespie argued libertarian means inevitably lead to libertarian rather than traditionalist ends.

== Works ==
=== Articles ===
- Devine, Donald (1982), "American Culture and Public Administration", Policy Studies Journal, 11 (2): 255–260, doi:10.1111/j.1541-0072.1982.tb00251.x, ISSN 1541-0072
- Devine, Donald (2004), "The future of labor relations in the federal public sector", Journal of Labor Research, 25: 9–18, doi:10.1007/s12122-004-1001-1

=== Books ===
- The Attentive Public: Polyarchical Democracy (1970, Rand McNally)
- The Political Culture of the United States: The Mass Influence On Regime Maintenance (1972, Little, Brown and Company)
- Does Freedom Work? Liberty and Justice in America (1978, Caroline House)
- Reagan Electionomics, 1976–1984: How Reagan Ambushed the Pollsters (1983, Green Hill Publishers)
- Reagan's Terrible Swift Sword: Reforming and Controlling the Federal Bureaucracy (1991, Jameson Books)
- Restoring the Tenth Amendment: The New American Federalist Agenda (1996, Vytis)
- In Defense of the West: American Values Under Siege (2004, University Press of America)
- America's Way Back: Freedom, Tradition, Constitution (2013, ISI Books)
- Political Management of the Bureaucracy: A Guide to Reform and Control (2017, Jameson Books)
- The Enduring Tension: Capitalism and the Moral Order (2021, Encounter Books)
- Ronald Reagan's Enduring Principles (2023, Kindle Direct)
