= Frank Meyer (political philosopher) =

American philosopher and political activist (1909–1972)

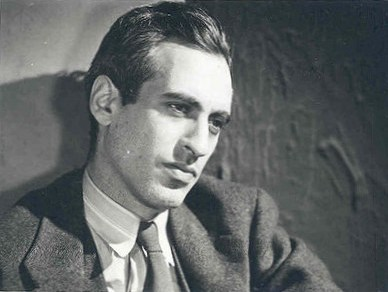
- Born: May 9, 1909; Newark, New Jersey, U.S.
- Died: April 1, 1972 (aged 62); Woodstock, New York, U.S.
- Spouse: Elsie Bown
- Children: 2

Education
- Education: Balliol College, Oxford (BA, MA)

Philosophical work
- Era: 20th-century philosophy
- Region: Western philosophy
- Notable ideas: Fusionism

Frank Straus Meyer (/ˈmaɪ.ər/; May 9, 1909 – April 1, 1972) was an American philosopher and political activist best known for his theory of "fusionism" – a political philosophy that unites elements of libertarianism and traditionalism into a philosophical synthesis which is posited as the definition of modern American conservatism. Meyer's philosophy was presented in two books, primarily In Defense of Freedom: A Conservative Credo (1962) and also in a collection of his essays, The Conservative Mainstream (1969). Fusionism has been summed up by E. J. Dionne, Jr. as "utilizing libertarian means in a conservative society for traditionalist ends".

== Personal life ==
Meyer was born to a prominent business family of German Jewish descent in Newark, New Jersey, the son of Helene (Straus) and Jack F. Meyer. He graduated from Newark Academy He attended Princeton University for one year and then transferred to Balliol College at Oxford University, where he earned his B.A. in 1932 and his M.A. in 1934. He later studied at the London School of Economics and became the student union's president before he was expelled and deported in 1933 for his communist activism.

Like a number of the founding senior editors of National Review magazine, Meyer was first a Communist Party USA apparatchik before he converted to political conservatism. His experiences as a communist are reported in his book The Moulding of Communists: The Training of the Communist Cadre in 1961. He began an "agonizing reappraisal of his communist beliefs" after he had read F. A. Hayek's The Road to Serfdom while he served in the US Army during World War II, and he made a complete break in 1945, after 14 years in active leadership service to the Communist Party and its cause. Following the war, he contributed articles to the early free market periodical The Freeman, and he later joined the original staff of National Review in 1955.

After completing his turn to the right, Meyer became a close adviser to and confidant of William F. Buckley, Jr., the founder and editor of National Review, who, in the introduction to Buckley's book Did You Ever See a Dream Walking: American Conservative Thought in the 20th Century (1970), gave Meyer the credit for properly synthesizing the traditionalist and libertarian strains in conservatism, starting at the magazine itself. Meyer wrote a column "Principles and Heresies", which appeared in each issue of the magazine; was its book review editor; and acted as a major spokesman for its principles.

Meyer married the former Elsie Bown. They had two sons, John Cornford Meyer, a lawyer, and then Eugene Bown Meyer, who became a president of the Federalist Society. Both sons hold international titles in chess. John is a FIDE Master, and Eugene holds the rank of International Master, just below Grandmaster.

Meyer converted to Catholicism just before he died of lung cancer in 1972.

Meyer was known in conservative and libertarian circles for his nocturnal lifestyle. Buckley recalled in Miles Gone By: A Literary Autobiography that Meyer would sleep the day and be on the phone at night on behalf of his journalism and activism. His presentation won him a broad following among conservative intellectuals in the 1960s and 1970s, who promoted it individually and through the organization he cofounded, the American Conservative Union, and through other modern conservative institutions and think tanks influenced by him, including The Heritage Foundation, The Fund for American Studies, the Intercollegiate Studies Institute, and Young America's Foundation.

== Philosophy of history ==
The most important place to begin placing Meyer in context is his article "Western Civilization: The Problem of Political Freedom", which closed the 1996 edition of In Defense of Freedom and Related Essays. As a thinker in what F. A. Hayek called the "critical rationalist" philosophical school, which is more empirical than the "constructivist rationalism" of a priori deductivism, Meyer's understanding of world history is central to his philosophy. Meyer's essential argument is explicitly based upon the philosopher Eric Voegelin's multivolume Order and History that all world history until more modern times was composed of "cosmological" societies that unified all social activity under one controlling myth subsuming society and the state into one common understanding and power monism. Meyer labeled the societies "tightly unified" in their mores, culture, economies, religion, and government by suppressing all contradictory understandings.

Following Lord Acton's "Liberty in Ancient Times", Meyer found only two historical "stirrings" in which that cosmological unity was even temporarily breached. In Athens, Socrates used his vision of the cave to discover a reality behind its cosmological reality as interpreted by its democratic authorities, which challenged them by viewing ideal forms as the real repository of truth beyond the myths of its culture. The unity was challenged so fundamentally that society turned upon the prophet, killed him, and returned to its previous unity. Abraham likewise rejected the cosmological unity of Ur and claimed a God that was independent of and more powerful than its myth, which Moses reinforced years later by rejecting Egyptian cosmological society to establish a Jerusalem whose prophets would likewise challenge state and society, with Nathan even forcing the monarch to admit evil and to repent. Still, the representatives of state power generally ignored or restricted the challengers, and in any event, a new cosmological state, Rome, ended both stirrings and established an even stronger cosmological unity.

Caesar became the "sanctified symbol of the cosmos", in Meyer's terms, and came to dominate the known world. About the same happened in China, India, Persia, the Americas, and the rest. Modern times did not break the unity until a small voice in Rome's hinterlands cried out, "Render to Caesar the things that are Caesar's and to God the things that are God's." The Incarnation, the "flash of eternity into time" as Meyer labeled it, effectively severed the unity by its concrete effects and proved even more empirically enduring in Europe than Caesar. However, it created not a new unity but a "tension" between empirical power and a mystical power sourced from another world but energizing this world. In Europe are "two sets of tensions" of church and state contested and later added other tensions from cities, towns and estates that culminated in a Magna Carta that demanded for no single force to unify the rest, which created the conditions for freedom under agreed upon law, rather than a single state-enforced cosmological way.

The idea of dividing power to allow freedom within its tradition was only partially realized in medieval Europe and was later challenged fundamentally by the rise of national monarchies and parliaments, which claimed a divine or popular right and power to reconstitute itself in new cosmological or utopian forms to retrieve the sense of order and unity promised by monism. Before the tension was tamed in England, it was transferred to America, where it was protected by its colonial isolation, allowing the tension and balance of power between freedom and tradition to reach its zenith in the US Constitution. The utopian temptation to return to the cocoon of cosmological or radical unity, however, survived even in America.

Whether reform was domestic, as from Woodrow Wilson, or more foreign influences, such as Jean-Jacques Rousseau, Hobbes, and Niccolò Machiavelli, they saw division of power and the tradition that sustained its tension as the central societal problems of modern times, with the task of reform to remove the impediments to a restored unity. To Meyer, the task of conservatism was to preserve the tension of the Western tradition to protect human freedom, which was inherently pluralist.

== Freedom and tradition ==
In his most influential book, In Defense of Freedom, freedom was defined in what Isaiah Berlin would label "negative" terms as the minimization of the use of coercion by the state in its essential role of preventing one person's freedom from intruding upon another's. While left-utopianism was considered the immediate threat to the survival of this freedom, Meyer aimed at a "New Conservatism" as the principle antagonist against liberty from the right in his day. This new conservatism viewed society as an organism whose agent was the national government rather than the states or private entities. The new conservatives were less statist than the left and even rhetorically supported freedom, but it was a freedom defined as an end rather than a means, with Meyer using Clinton Rossiter's 1955 definition of positive freedom in his Conservatism in America as his major foil.

Meyer argued that virtue could reside only in the individual. The state should protect freedom but otherwise leave virtue to individuals. The right of others to freedom must be respected by the individual even if the state does not respect it. The state has only three legitimate functions: police, military, and legal system, all necessary to control coercion, which is immoral if not restricted. There is an obligation to others but it is individual, for even the "Great Commandment" is expressed in individual form: God, neighbor and oneself are each individual. Virtue is critical for society and freedom must be balanced by responsibility but both are inherently individual in form. Forced values cannot be virtuous. The question of how to preserve moral order is important but would take "another book" which he never wrote. Yet even when the state takes properly limited acts to protect freedom, tradition will necessarily shape every such decision.

Freedom by itself has no goal, no intrinsic end. Freedom is not abstract or utopian as with the utilitarians, who also make freedom an end rather than a means. A utopia of freedom is a contradiction in terms. In a real society, traditional order and freedom can exist together only in tension. To retain the essentiality of both freedom and tradition, the solution to the dilemma is "grasping it by both horns". The solution is a synthesis of both, even in the face of those such as Leo Strauss who argue that no such synthesis is possible or even logical. Donald Devine has argued Meyer's synthesis is a first principle or axiom that is as valid as Strauss's monist first principle and relates this to Hayek's critical rationalism philosophical tradition and those he identifies with it such as Aristotle, Cicero, Thomas Aquinas, Montesquieu, John Locke, Adam Smith and Lord Acton.

== Critics ==
=== Traditionalist critics ===
Meyer's attempt at synthesis was questioned by those representing both constituent parts. Traditionalists were provoked by Meyer's negative statements about two of their favorites, Robert Nisbet and Russell Kirk, which Kirk reciprocated by calling him "an ideologue for liberty". Meyer, however, did refer to both as "serious" thinkers, a Meyer footnote even conceded Kirk "in recent years" had been more supportive of freedom, and he called Kirk's views on freedom itself "excellent". Meyer also conceded that both Nisbet and Kirk primarily desired only local as opposed to national or even state community power "to their credit" but they could be chided even then for not understanding that the rationale for local community is that local government is more based upon freedom.

The traditionalist Rossiter rather than Kirk or Nisbet was Meyer's target. Meyer even granted the New Conservatives were correct that virtue is "the most important of problems". The fundamental problem was that Rossiter insisted upon a "positive freedom" that changed freedom from a means to an end, just as did the utilitarian libertarians. Contrary to the Catholic philosopher Stanley Parry's claim that Meyer did not even recognize the family as a natural community, Meyer called the family and state "necessary associations". The family was different from all other institutions since children were not full individuals and thus required protection and limited rights. He argued that the state actually had been a hindrance to both virtue and the family rather than their champion. As far as educating children, prior to state control schools taught virtue and the truths of Western civilization and now do not.

Fellow National Review editor Brent Bozell criticized Meyer for demanding a "maximum freedom" and for arguing that freedom is necessary in order to act virtuously. Meyer did not make either claim. He actually wrote that total freedom was impossible. He did not say that freedom was necessary for virtue but only that forced virtue is not virtuous. A forced act may be objectively virtuous in some sense but not for the individual who is forced to act. Meyer's concern was that to give the state the power to define virtue is to have no standard for virtue at all. Its definition would change with every change in power distribution. One cannot give the state the definition of virtue or there is no virtue – there is only power. Actually, Bozell at the end recommended a social policy based upon the moral principle of subsidiarity, which is not all that different from Meyer's position.

A Parry article argued that the Meyer libertarian critique was correct about the state and reform did necessitate a revision of tradition once the previous vision had lost its energy. Pure restoration would be reactionary and impossible once broken. Restoration required a new "prophet" who would have to convince people freely to adopt the revision, not to rely upon force, which simply cannot be inspiring enough for substantial change. It is necessary to take what is good from the present tradition, remove what has been abused and proclaim the revision as a renewed tradition, which must specifically convince the "individual members of a multitude" in order for a true synthesis to revitalize society.

In the late 1960s, Meyer engaged in a continuing debate over the status of Abraham Lincoln with Harry V. Jaffa. Jaffa faulted Meyer for blaming Lincoln for the "destruction of the autonomy of the states". Meyer argued that Lincoln's abuses of civil liberties and expansion of government power should make him anathema to conservatives, while Jaffa defended Lincoln as in the tradition of the Founding Fathers. Slavery, segregation and African American civil rights were seen as the defining case against fusionism's relevance to modern times because of the insistence by Meyer and others at the time that states rights be preserved even in the face of these demands.

Harry V. Jaffa argued that neither state nor national sovereignty was clearly established in the Constitution but no American president has in fact operated on the assumption that state power was preeminent, giving the Constitution a nationalist orientation. Once in position to act nationally, all presidents have exercised national power. Some of the cited presidents did act in favor of states rights but mostly as state officials or former presidents than when in power, such as Thomas Jefferson or James Madison. Meyer replied that in fact the states had power and even caused a Civil War, which was more accurately labeled as a war between the states.

Meyer argued that limited national power, state autonomy, and decentralism were the essence of the Constitution as far as government was concerned. Lord Acton considered federalism the unique contribution of America to the historical understanding of freedom. Certainly that force has atrophied over time and even Meyer conceded some 14th Amendment limits to state actions. But he maintained with National Review editor James Burnham that the Federal Courts were not supreme. Separation of powers was the essence of the Constitution, very much including the states whose checks and balances were still alive in his day in the effective if partial state nullification of national court cases and laws.

=== Libertarian critics ===
Some libertarians vigorously joined in criticizing Meyer's conclusion that both ideological libertarianism and traditionalism were distortions of same Western tradition and that both undermined freedom. Meyer specifically censured libertarian favorites Jeremy Bentham and John Stuart Mill for setting freedom as an end, not unlike the New Conservatives, only the ends were different. Meyer argued that utilitarian libertarians today use court power to force "freedom" ends with such vague phrases as due process and equal protection and manipulating utopian versions of freedom of the press, religion and speech. Pure libertarians assume they know what "freedom" is and that the state should enforce their vision through the courts. Meyer argued that freedom by itself had no end, no purpose other than as a means for people to freely choose their own ends.

Ronald Hamowy argued Meyer's synthesis cannot hold because there was a fundamental difference between a classical liberalism that promoted markets and freedom and a traditionalist conservatism that resisted it. Murray Rothbard was viewed favorably by Meyer for his recognition of the importance of tradition in reasoning, especially his support for St. Thomas Aquinas and his view that Enlightenment "hatred" for the medieval Catholic Church weakened freedom. Rothbard was only criticized as too pessimistic in his view of the courts as the "final power" compared to Meyer's view that separation of powers left no one branch in charge and that each has power against the others, including the Congress and the states against the national courts.

Rothbard, in fact, argued that Meyer's fusionism was actually the natural law-natural rights branch of libertarian thought which Rothbard himself and other true libertarians followed. Libertarian journalist Ryan Sager in 2007's The Elephant in the Room: Evangelicals, Libertarians, and the Battle for the Soul of the Republican Party reviewed Meyer's work favorably and called for a principled revival of Meyer's fusionism to save the embattled party following its 2006 electoral defeats.

== Meyer's philosophical synthesis ==
Rothbard's argument that Meyer was simply a libertarian and not a synthesizer, someone who was somewhat confused about the nature of tradition, can be criticized in return for forcing tradition into his philosophy through the back door by calling it "common sense". Rothbard insisted morality was already part of libertarianism as he understood it – the "Aristotelian-Lockean natural rights wing", as he labeled it, as opposed to the "utilitarian-emotivist-hedonistic wing".

Paul Gottfried criticized Meyer's fusionist synthesis from the traditionalist, realist right by charging that it is impossible to say that Meyer's fusionism had worked. It rejected many elements of a comprehensive fusionism that could have created a movement that achieved great things but failed in this by purging powerful voices on the right who did not follow its party line. Meyer rested his view of freedom upon "Christian metaphysics" as did Rothbard, Gottfried argued, making Meyer's philosophy of history too "rough" to attract many of the Old Right who were more realist, secular and pragmatic. Rejected by the fusionist right these tended to see themselves as martyrs to their principles, especially excluded by the neoconservatives who controlled access to intellectual funding and prestige. Gottfried called for a new more comprehensive fusionist alliance based upon "similar" Meyer-like principles that could now include a second generation Old Right that "no longer extols an active government even in principle", a coalition that would only exclude the nationalist, pro big government neoconservatives.

In 2004, Joseph Bottum "cannot see how to put the cracked egg of conservatism back together. There seems no place in America these days for Frank Meyer fusionism, or even Ronald Reagan's big-tent Republicanism." Gottfried's paleocons reject "True Man" as understood by St. Augustine and most libertarians reject religion, which is the life of the Western state, Bottum argued, and both libertarians and traditionalists elements of the Meyer fusion today tend to dismiss the need for an aggressive foreign policy. Bottum instead offered a new "tension" between religion and the Enlightenment, a new fusionism of religious traditionalists and secular "foreign policy neoconservatives" as they have been gathered at The Weekly Standard magazine, where he was an editor. He was sensitive that this might be viewed as a "fairly cynical bargain" manipulated by the neoconservatives but insisted it resulted from "mutual persuasion" in debate with the social conservatives. The nature of the agreement is unclear except in a presumed joint opposition to abortion. Yet, even Bottom conceded that when the religious faction questioned the legitimacy of the Court in its failure to end abortion, the neoconservatives attacked it ruthlessly for questioning the government's legitimacy. While Bottum argued the coalition survived the controversy, it is unclear whether the two can manage the legitimacy question since it is primary for the neoconservatives and only at best secondary for the religious traditionalists.

It was the classical liberal F. A. Hayek in "Freedom, Reason and Tradition" who most systematically and relentlessly pursued the nature of a libertarian/traditionalist synthesis but was loath to give it a label. He began by distinguishing between two views of human reason, a speculative/rationalistic/utopian and an empirical/evolutionary/institutional one, which was "particularly conspicuous" in their different assumptions about human nature. The former viewed intelligence and goodness as natural to individual man while the latter argued that institutions must be created so that "bad people could do least harm". While not arguing for this on religious grounds, he acknowledged his empirical position was "closer to the Christian tradition of the fallibility and sinfulness of man, while the perfectionism of the rationalist is in irreconcilable conflict with it". To Hayek, like Meyer, freedom and tradition were fused. "Paradoxical as it may appear, it is probably true that a successful free society will always in large measure be a tradition-bound society", for a free society needs customs, laws and institutions whose observance is a "necessary condition" for freedom. Freedom is the means but the "values into which we are born supplies the ends which our reason must serve". This fusion was believed essential not only to social life but to thought, science and to reason itself. Without that dualism, there would have been no historical freedom. It was not a coincidence that Hayek was the one who first led Meyer to arrive at his mature philosophy.

== Influence on Ronald Reagan ==
As Ronald Reagan assumed the pinnacle of power of the presidency in 1981, in his first speech to an audience of his conservative allies in Washington, he reminded them of their roots. After listing "intellectual leaders like Russell Kirk, Friedrich Hayek, Henry Hazlitt, Milton Friedman, James Burnham, [and] Ludwig von Mises" as the ones who "shaped so much of our thoughts", he discussed only one of these influences at length.

"It's especially hard to believe that it was only a decade ago, on a cold April day on a small hill in upstate New York, that another of these great thinkers, Frank Meyer, was buried. He'd made the awful journey that so many others had: He pulled himself from the clutches of The [communist] God That Failed, and then in his writing fashioned a vigorous new synthesis of traditional and libertarian thought – a synthesis that is today recognized by many as modern conservatism."

As he recalled him, the new president outlined the ideas Meyer synthesized as the principles motivating this new conservative movement.

"It was Frank Meyer who reminded us that the robust individualism of the American experience was part of the deeper current of Western learning and culture. He pointed out that a respect for law, an appreciation for tradition, and regard for the social consensus that gives stability to our public and private institutions, these civilized ideas must still motivate us even as we seek a new economic prosperity based on reducing government interference in the marketplace. Our goals complement each other. We're not cutting the budget simply for the sake of sounder financial management. This is only a first step toward returning power to the states and communities, only a first step toward reordering the relationship between citizen and government."

"We can make government again responsive to the people by cutting its size and scope and thereby ensuring that its legitimate functions are performed efficiently and justly. Because ours is a consistent philosophy of government, we can be very clear: We do not have a separate social agenda, separate economic agenda, and a separate foreign agenda. We have one agenda. Just as surely as we seek to put our financial house in order and rebuild our nation's defenses, so too we seek to protect the unborn, to end the manipulation of schoolchildren by utopian planners, and permit the acknowledgement of a Supreme Being in our classrooms just as we allow such acknowledgements in other public institutions."

The essence of this fusionist synthesis was "cutting the size and scope" of the national government and "returning power to the states and communities" to allow the traditional "social consensus", its "robust individualism", and the free market to restore prosperity and civic vitality. Ronald Reagan took Meyer's idea of this Western synthesis into government and could claim some success in translating it into power, at least for a while.

== Works ==
- The Moulding of Communists: the training of the Communist cadre, New York: Harcourt, Brace, 1961.
- In Defense of Freedom: A Conservative Credo, Chicago: Henry Regnery, 1962
- Left, Right and Center: Essays on Liberalism and Conservatism in the United States, ed. by Robert Goldwin, Frank Meyer, et al., Chicago: Rand, McNally, 1965
- The Conservative Mainstream, New Rochelle: Arlington House, 1969.
