= Mount Vernon Statement =

The Mount Vernon Statement is a statement affirming the United States Constitution, particularly in response to the rise of progressivism in the United States. It was inspired by the Sharon Statement.

It was signed on February 17, 2010, at a public library (Collingwood Library and Museum) in Fairfax County, Virginia, a location chosen after the Mount Vernon Ladies' Association, which owns Mt. Vernon, turned down the group's request to hold a meeting at Mr. Washington's estate.

The statement reads, in part:

We recommit ourselves to the ideas of the American Founding. Through the Constitution, the Founders created an enduring framework of limited government based on the rule of law. They sought to secure national independence, provide for economic opportunity, establish true religious liberty and maintain a flourishing society of republican self-government.

== Original signers ==
- Ken Blackwell
- L. Brent Bozell III
- T. Kenneth Cribb Jr.
- Elaine Donnelly
- Becky Norton Dunlop
- Lee Edwards
- Edwin Feulner
- Colin Hanna
- David Keene
- Kathryn Jean Lopez
- David M. McIntosh
- Edwin Meese
- Grover Norquist
- Tony Perkins
- Alfred S. Regnery
- Richard Viguerie
- Bill Wilson
- Wendy Wright
