= Konstantin Preobrazhensky =

Former KGB officer

Konstantin Georgiyevich Preobrazhenskiy (Russian: Константин Георгиевич Преображенский; born 1953 in Moscow) is a former KGB lieutenant colonel, an intelligence expert and the author of several books and numerous articles about Russian secret police organizations.

Preobrazhenskiy is known for his publications about KGB operations in Japan, recruitment of Russian emigrants by Russian Foreign Intelligence Service, and infiltration of the Russian Orthodox Church by the KGB/Federal Security Service (FSB).

== KGB career ==
Preobrazhenskiy graduated from the Institute of Asian and African countries of the Moscow State University in 1976 and started working in the Foreign Intelligence department of the KGB. He was an advisor on China, Japan and Korea to Leonid Zaitsev, the Head of the Scientific and Technical Intelligence (Directorate “T”), in the First Chief Directorate.

In 1980–85, Preobrazhenskiy worked under cover as a TASS correspondent at the KGB station in Tokyo. He recruited Chinese scholars for the Soviet Scientific and Technical Intelligence. In July 1985, the Japanese police arrested him at a meeting with his Chinese agent, and he was transferred back to Moscow. He described these events in book “The Spy Who Loved Japan” published in 1994.

== Writer and journalist ==
In 1991, Preobrazhenskiy left the KGB and started authoring books and articles about Russian state security services and on various political subjects. In 1993–2002, he worked as a columnist for the Moscow Times newspaper.

He fled to the United States in January 2003, after several episodes of harassment by Russian state security services. He was granted political asylum in March 2006.

He is a regular guest on the Voice of America and has been a lecturer at Columbia, Georgetown and Johns Hopkins Universities as well as an invited speaker at The Intelligence Summit. His most recent book is titled "KGB/FSB's New Trojan Horse: Americans of Russian Descent"

== Statements ==
Preobrazhenskiy had numerous meetings with the former FSB officer Alexander Litvinenko and commented on his assassination:

I have no hesitation to say that he was murdered by Vladimir Putin, who considered him to be his personal enemy. Putin is very vulnerable to criticism. He has the inferiority complex. And Litvinenko knew a lot about Putin, about his drawbacks, about his connections with some political forces which are not disclosed even now, because Litvinenko knew Putin personally. And Putin was the person who dismissed Litvinenko from the FSB.

According to Preobrazhenskiy, Putin initially worked in the 5th KGB department that was responsible for suppression of internal dissent in the country

== Articles and interviews ==
- His interview, RFE/RL <--Interview:Broken Link
- Interview about his new book, Voice of America
- Russian Orthodox Church and KGB His interview, Voice of America
- Poisonings of priests in Russian Orthodox Church outside of Russia, Part I
- Poisonings of priests in Russian Orthodox Church outside of Russia, Part II
- Poisonings in Russian Orthodox Church outside of Russia (more detail)
- Discussion of his articles about Russian Orthodox Church

== Books ==
- Unknown Japan. Преображенский К.Г. Неизвестная Япония. - М.: АО "Япония сегодня", 1993. - 286 с.: ил.
- KGB in Japan. Spy who loved Tokio. Преображенский, Константин Георгиевич. КГБ в Японии. Шпион, который любил Токио. - М. : Центрполиграф, 2000. - 455, [2] с., [4] л. портр. : ил. - (Секретная папка).
- Back from the Dead: The Return of the Evil Empire, with Cliff Kincaid of Accuracy in Media, J. R. Nyquist, and Toby Westerman, Amazon Standard Identification Number=B00MHGG784 (2014)
