= Thomas N. Bisson =

American historian (1931–2025)

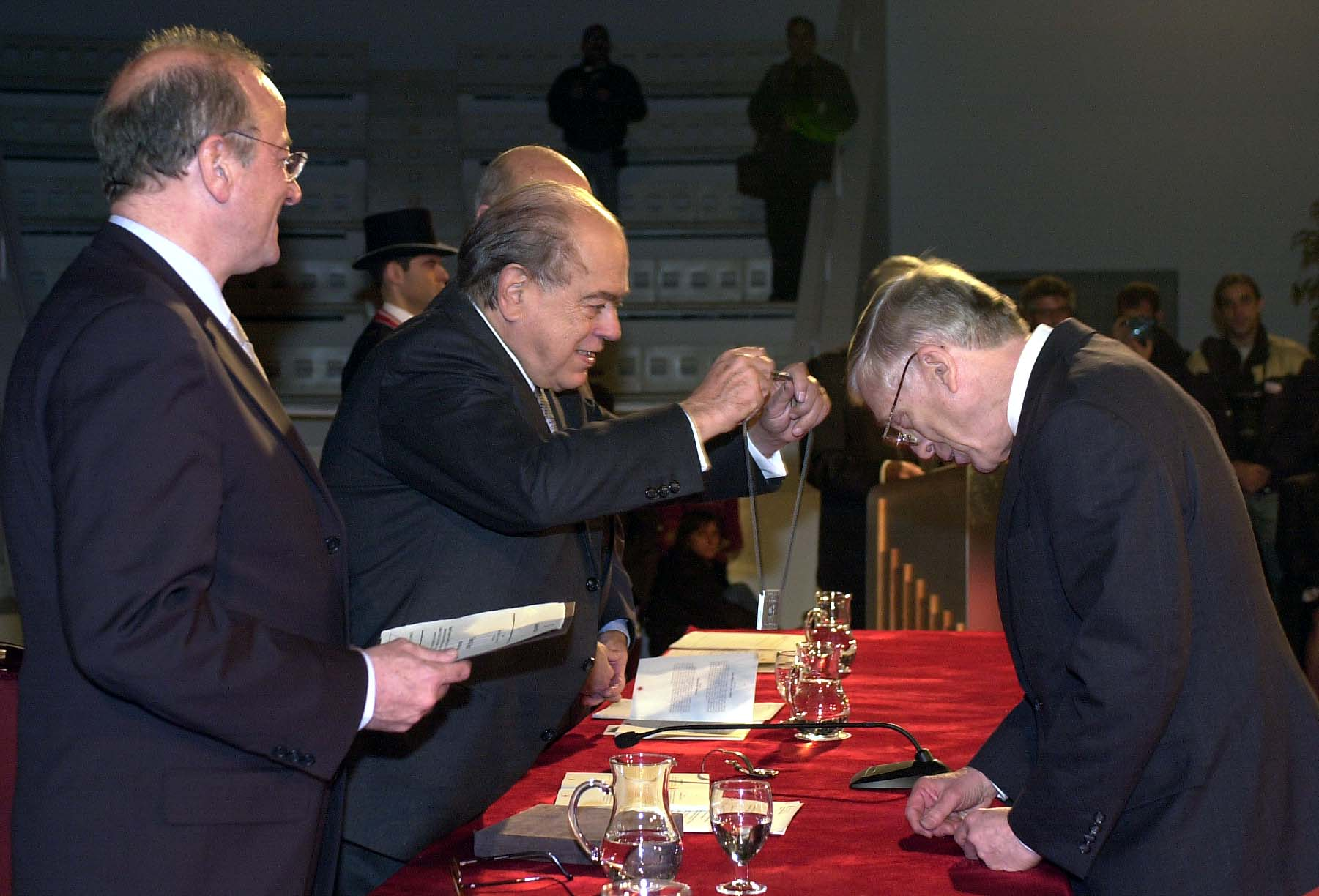
- Bisson (right) accepts a medal from Catalan president Jordi Pujol, 2001
- Born: March 30, 1931; New York City, U.S.
- Died: June 28, 2025 (aged 94); Cambridge, Massachusetts, U.S.
- Education: Haverford College (BA); Princeton University (MA, PhD)
- Occupations: Historian; medievalist; academic; author
- Father: Thomas Arthur Bisson
- Awards: Haskins Medal (1987); Creu de Sant Jordi, Generalitat de Catalunya (2001)

Thomas Noel Bisson (March 30, 1931 – June 28, 2025) was an American historian, medievalist, academic and author. He was the Henry Charles Lea Professor of Medieval History Emeritus at Harvard University.

Bisson was elected a fellow of the Medieval Academy of America (1975), a member of the American Philosophical Society (1977), and a fellow of the American Academy of Arts and Sciences (1992). He also was a corresponding member of the Institute for Catalan Studies and the Reial Acadèmia de Bones Lletres de Barcelona, and was a corresponding fellow of the British Academy.

== Life and career ==
Bisson was born in New York City on March 30, 1931. His father was the writer Thomas Arthur Bisson. He earned a Bachelor of Arts in history and English from Haverford College in 1953. From 1955 to 1957, he studied at Princeton University as a Charlotte Elizabeth Proctor Fellow and obtained his Ph.D. from Princeton in 1958.

He began his academic career as an instructor in history at Amherst College from 1957 to 1960. He then held positions as an assistant professor at Brown University from 1960 to 1965, followed by an appointment as an associate professor at Swarthmore College from 1965 to 1967. In 1967, he was appointed associate professor at the University of California, Berkeley, where he was a professor of history from 1969 to 1987. He joined Harvard University as a visiting professor in 1986, was appointed Henry Charles Lea Professor of Medieval History at Harvard in 1988, and was the Emeritus Lea Professor of Medieval History from 2005 onwards.

Bisson was president of the Medieval Academy of America (1994–95) and served as chairman of the Department of History from 1991 to 1995 at Harvard University. He died on June 28, 2025, at the age of 94, following a brief illness.

== Personal life ==
In 1962, Bisson married Margaretta Carroll Webb. He had two daughters.

== Research and publications ==
Bisson's research lay in the fields of history and medieval studies with its focus on the cultural history of power in medieval Europe, particularly France and Catalonia, in the post- Carolingian period (A.D. 950–1250). In addition to articles, his publications include books, among them Conservation of Coinage: Monetary Exploitation and its Restraint in France, Catalonia, and Aragon (c.A.D. 1000–c.1225); The Medieval Crown of Aragon: A Short History, a survey of medieval Catalonia during the centuries when it was ruled by kings of Aragon; an edited collection of studies by other historians entitled Cultures of Power: Lordship, Status, and Process in Twelfth-Century Europe. His course in Harvard's Core program, offered in 1988, 1990, 1993, 2001, 2003, became a book entitled The Crisis of the Twelfth Century: Power, Lordship, and the Origins of European Government. In a review for the New York Review of Books, Robert Bartlett contended that this was a book about government, after all, but in his rebuttal, Bisson insisted on his own distinction, rooted in the sources, between power and government. His edition of the Fiscal Accounts of Catalonia, led to his book Tormented Voices: Power, Crisis, and Humanity in Rural Catalonia, 1140–1200, which explored peasants' voices from Catalan villagers revealing their grievances against the Count of Barcelona's agents, shedding light on ambitions to power amongst non-nobles in castles, as Margaretta S. Handhe stated, "Using excellent prose and interpretive skill, Bisson has rescued these peasants from anonymity and given their sufferings a life beyond their mortal existence." Of his last book, The Chronography of Robert of Torigni, 2 vols., Sean McGlynn wrote, "Bisson's masterful new edition is clearly to be considered as the new gold standard."

Bisson's article "The 'Feudal Revolution'" defended Marc Bloch and Georges Duby, French historians who had demonstrated a massive societal transformation in the eleventh and twelfth centuries, when lords, fiefs, and vassals multiplied. In his presidential address to the Medieval Academy of America (1995), he pointed out that lords and lordships had multiplied exponentially after about 990. This entailed a breakdown of public order, the rise of new lordships amongst the men of castles in the quest of nobility, the loss of civic or official identities, and while he had first studied precedents for parliamentary representation in the thirteenth century, his later books and teaching stressed the importance of public interest as a new and debatable concept essential to government, however minimal, and first perceptible in Catalonia and England in the years from about 1180 to 1215. As he first argued in The Crisis of the Twelfth Century, there were notable precedents for official order, with new forms of accountability arising in France, the Low Countries, and England even as accountable agents, such as sheriffs continued to behave like lords in quest of noble status. In another study Pouvoir et consuls à Toulouse (1150–1205), he showed that elected consuls themselves were striving for lordly status.

== Awards and honors ==
- 1964 – Guggenheim Fellowship, John Simon Guggenheim Memorial Foundation
- 1977 – Fellow, Medieval Academy of America
- 1978 – Member, American Philosophical Society
- 1989 – Charles Homer Haskins Medal, Medieval Academy of America
- 1991 – Honorary Doctorate, Autonomous University of Barcelona
- 1991 – Elected Corresponding Member, Institut d'Estudis Catalans
- 1992 – Elected Corresponding Fellow, The British Academy
- 1992 – Fellow, American Academy of Arts and Sciences
- 2001 – Creu de Sant Jordi, Generalitat de Catalunya

== Bibliography ==
=== Selected books ===
- Fiscal Accounts of Catalonia Under the Early Count-Kings (1151–1213) 2 vols. (1984) ISBN 978-0520043886
- The Medieval Crown of Aragon: A Short History (1986) ISBN 978-0198202363
- Cultures of Power: Lordship, Status, and Process in Twelfth-Century Europe (1995) ISBN 978-0812215557
- Tormented Voices: Power, Crisis, and Humanity in Rural Catalonia, 1140–1200 (1998) ISBN 978-0674895287
- The Crisis of the Twelfth Century: Power, Lordship, and the Origins of European Government (2015) ISBN 978-0691169767
- The Chronography of Robert of Torigni (2020) ISBN 978-0199682126

=== Selected articles ===
- Bisson, T. N. (1977). The organized Peace in Southern France and Catalonia, ca. 1140–ca. 1233. The American Historical Review, 82(2), 290–311.
- Bisson, T. N. (1978). The Problem of Feudal Monarchy: Aragon, Catalonia, and France. Speculum, 53(3), 460–478.
- Bisson, T. N. (1982). Celebration and persuasion: Reflections on the cultural evolution of medieval consultation. Legislative Studies Quarterly, 181–204.
- Bisson, T. N. (1994). The "feudal revolution". Past & Present, (142), 6–42.
- Bisson, T. N. (1999). Pouvoir et consuls à Toulouse (1150–1205) Les sociétés méridionales à l'âge féodal. ed. Hélène Débax (Toulouse 1999). 197–202.
