= Medford Bryan Evans =

American college professor, writer, editor and critic of liberalism

- Born: August 21, 1907; Lufkin, Angelina County; Texas, USA
- Died: February 4, 1989 (aged 81); Hamilton, Loudoun County; Virginia, USA
- Resting place: Lakeview Cemetery in Hamilton, Virginia
- Education: University of Tennessee at Chattanooga; Yale University
- Occupations: Professor; Conservative political activist
- Spouse: Josephine Stanton Evans (1908–2005)
- Children: M. Stanton Evans

Medford Bryan Evans (August 21, 1907 – February 4, 1989) was an American college professor, writer, editor, and critic of liberalism in American politics, education, and society. He was the father of the columnist M. Stanton Evans.

== Background ==
Evans was born in Lufkin in Angelina County in East Texas, the son of Lysander Lee Evans and the former Bird Medford. He graduated magna cum laude in 1927 from the University of Tennessee at Chattanooga and in 1933 received a Ph.D. from Yale University in New Haven, Connecticut. He taught at the University of Mississippi at Oxford, Mississippi (1928–1933), the Texas College of Arts and Industries—now known as Texas A&M University–Kingsville—(1933–1934), the University of Tennessee at Chattanooga (1934–1942), the University of the South in Sewanee, Tennessee (1943–1944), McMurry College in Abilene (as dean), Texas — now known as McMurry University— (1953–1954) and Northwestern State College in Natchitoches, Louisiana,—now Northwestern State University—in 1955-1959.

In addition, Evans worked for the since defunct radio station WDOD (AM) in Chattanooga, Tennessee (1943–1944), the Atomic Energy Commission in Oak Ridge, Tennessee and Washington, D.C. (1944–1952), the Los Alamos project, the publication Facts Forum for H.L. Hunt and Dan Smoot (1954–1955), and the Jackson (Mississippi) Citizen's Council as managing editor of The Citizen: A Journal of Fact and Opinion (1962-?), official publication of the Citizens' Councils of America in Jackson. One of Evans' articles in The Citizen, "How to Start a Private School" (1964), was republished as a small book and became influential in the South's burgeoning movement toward private day-schools to avoid school desegregation. (These schools were sometimes labeled "segregation academies" or "Christian academies" in the press, but virtually all now admit African-American pupils.)

Evans was also a member of the John Birch Society, founded by Robert W. Welch, Jr. During the 1960s and 1970s, he was a frequent contributor to the JBS monthly magazine, American Opinion. Evans also published articles in the conservative magazines National Review and Human Events.

Evans' other published writings include the books The Secret War for the A-Bomb (1953), Civil Rights Myths and Communist Realities (1965), The Usurpers (1968), and The Assassination of Joe McCarthy (1970), reflecting his belief in the revelations of communist subversion unveiled in the 1950s by U.S. Senator Joseph R. McCarthy of Wisconsin. The book The Death of James Forrestal (1966) by "Cornell Simpson" has also been attributed to Evans, an attribution challenged by his son, M. Stanton Evans.

Evans also lectured widely, even in small towns, mostly on anti-communist topics. Speaking in Minden, Louisiana, in 1956, Evans likened the attack on segregation in the South to communism. Evans was a supporter of segregation who thought Barry Goldwater was too liberal.

== Educational philosophy ==
Evans contributed articles on educational trends to magazines (e.g. Harper's) and newspapers. His usual topics were the decline in classical education, the need for vocational education, and the use of public schools to promote social engineering. A typical paragraph, from "What Are We Teaching Our Children" in American Opinion, shows how he could touch on all three themes at once:

It is my considered opinion that the average graduate of a non-elite college today knows less than the average graduate of an accredited high school knew thirty years ago. You may ask: Less of what? If so, I reply: Less of almost any field you care to name, and less of a total of all fields. It is sometimes assumed that we have substituted science for the classics. But in the mass institutions this is certainly not true. We have abandoned the classics, but we have not put science in their place. The average college student in my state today does not know any Latin, but he does not know any physics either. It is pretty hard to say just what he does know. Of course we have a lot of bright young people, and some of them do put their brightness to excellent use. But there is not much you can depend on any of them knowing simply by virtue of the fact that they have college degrees.

== Later years ==
Evans and his wife, the former Josephine Stanton (1908–2005), a teacher and government worker who was reared in McComb, Mississippi and graduated with honors from the University of Mississippi. The couple had a son, columnist M. Stanton Evans. The Evanses moved in 1986 from Jackson, Mississippi, to Hamilton in Loudoun County, Virginia, where each subsequently died.

== Selected works ==
- Civil Rights Myths and Communist Realities. Conservative Society of America, 1965. LCCN 65-26142.
