= Blacklisted by History =

2007 book by M. Stanton Evans

Blacklisted by History: The Untold Story of Senator Joe McCarthy and His Fight Against America's Enemies
- Author: M. Stanton Evans
- Language: English
- Subject: Joseph McCarthy
- Genre: Non-fiction
- Publication date: 2007
- ISBN: 9781400081066
- Dewey Decimal: 973.921092
- LC Class: E748.M143 E83

Blacklisted by History: The Untold Story of Senator Joe McCarthy and His Fight Against America's Enemies is a 2007 book by author M. Stanton Evans, who argues that Joseph McCarthy was proper in making accusations of disloyalty, subversion, or treason within the US State Department and the US Army, showing proper regard for evidence (during a period in the late 1940s and 1950s known as McCarthyism or the second Red Scare).

== Summary ==
The book's premise is that a vast Soviet conspiracy infiltrated the Roosevelt and Truman administrations to create a foreign policy that advanced the spread of world Communism, including the Soviet takeover of Eastern Europe and the fall of Nationalist China, which McCarthy exposed, only to have his efforts undermined by political opponents with a vested interest in allowing the conspiracy to continue.

== Reviews ==
Ronald Radosh, a historian and expert on the Cold War spies Julius and Ethel Rosenberg, states that "rather than a biography, Evans has written a defense counsel's brief for his client, whom he seeks to defend against all the slanders made about McCarthy by his political enemies." He praises Evans' "extensive research", and his exposure of the political agendas of McCarthy's main opponents and their unwillingness to look more closely into Soviet penetration. He also commends Evans for correcting the view that all of McCarthy's "victims" were innocent. Radosh severely criticizes McCarthy's failure to distinguish between communists and anti-communist "liberals", and between those expressing communist or pro-communist views and those working as Soviet agents, and criticizes Evans for glossing over this. Radosh concludes

Evans’s book falls far short of what it might have done to correct the record about the era. His own exaggerations and unwarranted leaps parallel those made by McCarthy. It is unlikely that his hope to change history’s verdict will become a reality as a result of the publication of this book.

Reviewing the book for The New York Times, American historian David Oshinsky, who also wrote a book on McCarthy in 1983, was harshly critical, calling Evans' primary thesis a "remarkable fantasy," asserting that Evans has uncovered no fresh evidence and arguing that the evidence supports the view that communist spy networks in the United States had largely been dismantled by the time McCarthy started his campaign and that McCarthy was "a bit player in the battle against Communist subversion, a latecomer who turned a vital crusade into a political mud bath... The fiercely negative judgments of those who lived through the McCarthy era are widely accepted today for good reason: they ring true."

Kirkus Reviews called the book "[a] revisionist biography", which, although a "detailed account", is "marred by ideological blinders" and fit "[f]or true believers only", Publishers Weekly described Evans as "given to conspiracy thinking" and Reason magazine described the book as "revisionist" and "a breathless defense of McCarthy."
