= Fusionism =

Political construct to align conservative and libertarian views

In American politics and political philosophy, fusionism refers to the philosophical and political combination of traditionalism and social conservatism with political and economic right-libertarianism. The concept is most closely associated with the political philosopher Frank Meyer, and it was popularized on the American right through the publication National Review. By the time of the presidency of Ronald Reagan (1981–89), fusionism was the dominant political philosophy within the Republican Party. Fusionism has been associated with other political movements on the American right, including neoconservatism, and contrasted to others, including Rockefeller Republicanism, "compassionate conservatism," national conservatism, and Trumpism.

== Origins ==
Fusionism was developed as a political theory during the 1950s at National Review, an editorial magazine founded by William F. Buckley Jr. According to Buckley, associate editor Frank Meyer "brokered ... an extraordinary mix" of libertarians, traditional conservatives and anti-communists to produce the ideas and writings that composed modern conservatism. Buckley identified Meyer's synthesis of limited government and social conservatism as the best definition of "conservatism" in the American context.

In 1960, the Sharon Statement, a fusionist statement of principles, was adopted at the inaugural meeting of the group Young Americans for Freedom at Buckley's childhood home in Sharon, Connecticut.

In his most influential book, In Defense of Freedom (1962), Meyer defined freedom in negative terms as minimal state coercion, accepting that the state had an essential role in preventing one individual's freedom from intruding upon another's. According to Meyer, the state should protect this definition of freedom but otherwise leave virtue to individuals. Meyer defined coercion as inherently immoral and restricted the state to three legitimate functions: internal policing, military defense, and maintaining a legal system for disputes between individuals. Although Meyer believed that virtue was critical for society and freedom must be balanced by responsibility, he argued that coerced behavior could never be virtuous and that both freedom and responsibility were inherently individual virtues. Meyer sought to accept the tension between freedom and order by critiquing both utilitarianism, which viewed freedom as an end in itself, and traditionalism, which sought to impose virtue but, by enlarging the state, inevitably promoted the preferences of a powerful elite.

Buckley biographer Carl Bogus noted fundamental tensions in the fusionist synthesis, particularly on the question of economic regulation; libertarians wanted as little state regulation as possible, while traditionalists believed that big business, if unconstrained, could impoverish national life and threaten freedom. Traditionalists also believed that a strong state, properly constructed to ensure that not too much power accumulated in any one branch, was necessary to ensure freedom. Libertarian author Jerome Tuccille has also identified fusionism as an attempt to overlook a fundamental tension between Aristotelianism, which he identified with reason, objectivity, and individual self-sufficiency, and Platonism, as identified with collective order.

== Political history ==
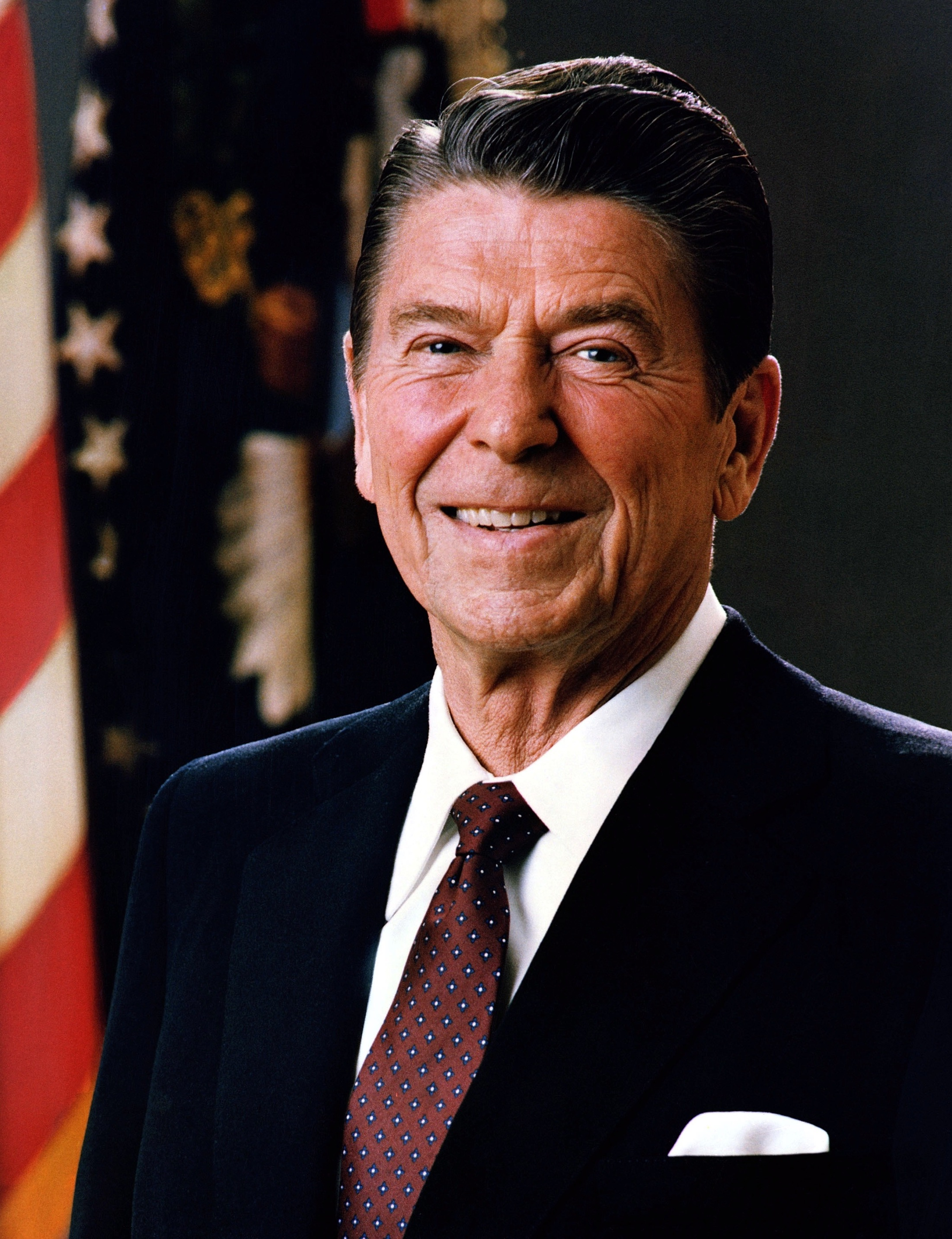
Fusionism is most closely associated with the political positions and presidency of Ronald Reagan.

=== Reagan era ===
Fusionism saw its height during the presidency of Ronald Reagan from 1981 to 1989. Reagan was an early reader of National Review and associate of both Buckley and Meyer. Upon assuming the presidency in 1981, Reagan met with conservative leaders from around the country and reminded them of their intellectual roots. After listing "intellectual leaders like Russell Kirk, Friedrich Hayek, Henry Hazlitt, Milton Friedman, James Burnham, [and] Ludwig von Mises" as the ones who "shaped so much of our thoughts," he discussed only one of these influences at length:

It's especially hard to believe that it was only a decade ago, on a cold April day on a small hill in upstate New York, that another of these great thinkers, Frank Meyer, was buried. He'd made the awful journey that so many others had: he pulled himself from the clutches of the [communist] God That Failed, and then in his writing fashioned a vigorous new synthesis of traditional and libertarian thought – a synthesis that is today recognized by many as modern conservatism.

As Reagan recalled Meyer, the new president outlined the ideas Meyer synthesized as the principles for this new conservative movement.

It was Frank Meyer who reminded us that the robust individualism of the American experience was part of the deeper current of Western learning and culture. He pointed out that a respect for law, an appreciation for tradition, and regard for the social consensus that gives stability to our public and private institutions, these civilized ideas must still motivate us even as we seek a new economic prosperity based on reducing government interference in the marketplace. Our goals complement each other. We're not cutting the budget simply for the sake of sounder financial management. This is only a first step toward returning power to the states and communities, only a first step toward reordering the relationship between citizen and government. We can make government again responsive to the people by cutting its size and scope and thereby ensuring that its legitimate functions are performed efficiently and justly. Because ours is a consistent philosophy of government, we can be very clear: We do not have a separate social agenda, separate economic agenda, and a separate foreign agenda. We have one agenda. Just as surely as we seek to put our financial house in order and rebuild our nation's defenses, so too we seek to protect the unborn, to end the manipulation of schoolchildren by utopian planners, and permit the acknowledgement of a Supreme Being in our classrooms just as we allow such acknowledgements in other public institutions.

=== After Reagan ===
Through the immediate aftermath of the Republican takeover of Congress in 1994, fusionism remained the unifying position of the party. Social conservativism was seen as ascendant during the presidency of George W. Bush (at least with respect to domestic politics). However, increased spending during the Bush years angered fiscal conservatives and libertarians and long-standing tensions between neoconservatism and paleoconservatism bubbled over in the wake of the 2003 invasion of Iraq. Following the party's defeat in the 2006 and 2008 elections and the global financial crisis, the Republican Party struggled with further tensions between libertarians and social conservatives with centrist economic views, leading to speculate Robert Tracinski to speculate in RealClearPolitics that the fusionist consensus within the Republican Party had ended. Brandon James Smith attributed the party's defeat in 2008 to Bush's abandonment of fusionism in favor of "compassionate conservatism."

=== Trump era ===
Following the 2016 election of Donald Trump, shifts in American conservative thinking have been described as toward a "new fusionism" of traditional conservative ideology and right-wing populism, including greater support for national conservatism, protectionism, cultural conservatism, realist foreign policy, and conspiratorial thinking, while reducing or repudiating neoconservatism, efforts to roll back entitlement programs, and traditional arguments for constitutional checks and balances.

== Criticisms ==
Fusionism has been criticized by both traditionalists and libertarians as a misfit between two contradictory views or as a marriage of convenience. Critics of both traditionalists and libertarians have also existed on the American right or within the Republican Party, such as nationalists or pragmatists.

=== Traditionalist criticisms ===
Conservative philosopher Russell Kirk was a longtime opponent of Meyer, fusionism, and libertarians generally, whom he referred to as "chirping sectaries" (quoting T. S. Eliot) and "an ideological clique forever splitting into sects still smaller and odder, but rarely conjugating." Although he agreed that both groups shared in opposition to collectivism, the totalist state, and bureaucracy, he argued that they have otherwise nothing in common. Instead, Kirk argued that the primary division in political thought was between believers in "some sort of transcendent moral order" and "utilitarians admitting no transcendent sanctions for conduct," including libertarians in the latter category.

Kirk also berated libertarians and limited-government advocates for upholding capitalism and economic self-interest as an absolute good. Kirk argued that self-interest was an insufficient basis for an economic system and even less adequate to preserve social order. By glorifying the individual, free market, and competition for material success, Kirk argued that libertarianism promoted materialism and undermined tradition, love, learning, and aesthetics, all of which he believed were essential components of human community.

=== Modern criticisms on the American right ===
Since 2014, fusionism has come under significant attack, especially by growing groups of Catholic integralists and postliberals. In 2018, these critiques have also been taken up by mainstream conservative commentators, including Tucker Carlson.

== See also ==
- Big tent
- Libertarian conservatism
- Movement conservatism
- Neoconservatism and paleoconservatism
- Neo-libertarianism
- Outline of libertarianism
