= Sharon Statement =

1960 fusionist YAF statement

The Sharon Statement is the founding statement of principles for Young Americans for Freedom. The views expressed in the statement, while not considered "traditional conservative principles" at the time, played a significant role in influencing Republican leaders in the 1980s. Written by M. Stanton Evans and adopted on September 11, 1960, the statement is named for the location of the inaugural meeting of Young Americans for Freedom, held at William F. Buckley, Jr.'s childhood home in Sharon, Connecticut.

== Background ==
In the late 1950s conservative students on college campuses campaigned for policies to combat communism. Many of these students became supporters of Barry Goldwater's 1960 campaign for the GOP vice-presidential nomination. At the Republican National Convention, Goldwater, failing to secure the nomination, challenged attendees saying: "Let’s grow up conservatives. If you want to take the party back, then let’s get to work!" In response, a meeting was organized at the home of William F. Buckley in Sharon, Connecticut.

In attendance at the Sharon Conference were about 90 students from 44 universities located in 24 states. Amongst the attendees were several future conservative leaders including historian Lee Edwards, Howard Phillips, Don Lipsett (co-founder Philadelphia Society), Paul Niemeyer (United States Court of Appeals for the Fourth Circuit), William A. Rusher (National Review publisher), Allan Ryskind (publisher of Human Events) and M. Stanton Evans. It was decided to organize a new organization which was named the Young Americans for Freedom (YAF). Evans was selected to draft the founding principles of the group, named Sharon Statement after Buckley's residence. Evans said he was influenced by the works of conservative thinkers such as F. A. Hayek, Russell Kirk, William F. Buckley Jr., and Whittaker Chambers.

== Summary ==
The Sharon Statement consists of less than 400 words. It's an expression of National Review editor Frank Meyer's "fusionism," described as a combination of traditional conservatism, libertarianism and anti-communism, the three prevailing variants of conservatism at the time. The inclusion of "God" in the document was controversial. The statement begins with the statement "foremost among the transcendent values is the individual's use of his God-given free will." It then proceeds to espouse five core principles which have directed the conservative movement since its adoption:

1. Individual freedom and the right of governing originate with God
2. Political freedom is impossible without economic freedom
3. Limited government and strict interpretation of the Constitution
4. The free market system is preferable over all others
5. Communism must be defeated, not contained

== Legacy ==
External videos
- 50th Anniversary of the Sharon Statement, C-SPAN video

Two years later, in 1962, Tom Hayden wrote the Port Huron Statement. The manifesto for Students for a Democratic Society has been called the left's response to the Sharon Statement.

In 2010, fifty years after the adoption of the Sharon Statement, the Mount Vernon Statement was written. The Mount Vernon Statement shares the same sentiment of the Sharon Statement. However, where Sharon focuses on the "outworkings of liberty and self-government", Mount Vernon emphasizes a principle from the Declaration of Independence: that human freedom is based on "the laws of nature and nature's God."

In a 2010 interview, Evans reflected on the impact of the Sharon Statement, attributing the document and the movement it spawned to the fall of the Soviet Union while failing to address the "domestic spending issue" and "cultural issues, educational issues."

In his obituary of Evans journalist Adam Clymer called it a "seminal document" in the establishment of the conservative movement.

The Heritage Foundation described the Sharon Statement as "a succinct summary of the central ideas of modern American conservatism".
