= M. Stanton Evans =

American journalist, author and educator (1934–2015)

- Born: July 20, 1934; Kingsville, Texas, US
- Died: March 3, 2015 (aged 80); Leesburg, Virginia, US
- Education: Yale University
- Occupation: Writer
- Spouse: Sue Ellen Moore (m. 1962; div. 1974)
- Relatives: Medford Bryan and Josephine Stanton Evans (parents)
- Writing career
- Period: 1951–2015
- Genre: Nonfiction
- Subjects: Politics, History
- Notable work: Blacklisted by History: The Untold Story of Senator Joe McCarthy and His Fight Against America's Enemies
- Notable awards: Honorary doctorates: Syracuse University, John Marshall Law School, Grove City College, Francisco Marroquín University; two Freedom Foundation awards: editorial writing; National Headliners Club Award: "consistently outstanding editorial pages"; William F. Buckley Jr. Award for Media Excellence (Media Research Center); Reed Irvine award for excellence in journalism (Accuracy in Media); Barbara Olson Award for Excellence & Independence in Journalism (American Spectator); John M. Ashbrook Award (Ashbrook Center for Public Affairs); Regnery Award for Distinguished Institutional Service (Intercollegiate Studies Institute); four George Washington medals (Freedoms Foundation of Valley Forge, Pennsylvania)
- Literary movement: Conservative

Medford Stanton Evans (July 20, 1934 – March 3, 2015), better known as M. Stanton Evans, was an American writer, commentator and leader in the conservative movement. He was the author of eight books, including Blacklisted by History: The Untold Story of Senator Joe McCarthy and His Fight Against America's Enemies (2007).

A theorist of the right, he was a leader in a number of conservative organizations, including chairman of the American Conservative Union from 1971 to 1977 and founder and leader of the National Journalism Center from 1997 to 2002. He died of cancer on March 3, 2015, in Virginia at age 80.

== Early life and education ==
Evans was born in Kingsville in Kleberg County in South Texas, the son of Medford Bryan Evans, an author, college professor at Northwestern State University in Natchitoches, Louisiana, and official of the United States Atomic Energy Commission, and the classics scholar Josephine Stanton Evans. He grew up in Chattanooga, Tennessee, and the Washington, D.C., metropolitan area.

Evans graduated in 1955 magna cum laude from Yale University, Phi Beta Kappa, with a Bachelor of Arts in English, followed by graduate work in Economics at New York University under Ludwig von Mises.

== Journalism ==
As an undergraduate, Evans was an editor for the Yale Daily News. It was at Yale that he read One Is a Crowd by Frank Chodorov. In The Conservative Intellectual Movement in America Since 1945, George H. Nash writes:

It was the first libertarian book he [Evans] had ever read, and [he said] it 'opened up more intellectual perspectives to me than did the whole Yale curriculum.' Evans came to believe that Chodorov 'probably had more to do with the conscious shaping of my political philosophy than any other person'.

Upon graduation, Evans became assistant editor of The Freeman, where Chodorov was editor. The following year, he joined the staff of William F. Buckley's fledgling National Review (where he served as associate editor from 1960 to 1973), and became managing editor of Human Events, where he remained a contributing editor until his death.

Evans became a proponent of National Review co-editor Frank Meyer's "fusionism", a political philosophy reconciling the traditionalist and libertarian tendencies of the conservative movement. He argued that freedom and virtue are not antagonistic, but complementary:

The idea that there is some sort of huge conflict between religious values and liberty is a misstatement of the whole problem. The two are inseparable. ... [I]f there are no moral axioms, why should there be any freedom? The conservative believes that ours is a God-centered, and therefore an ordered, universe; that man's purpose is to shape his life to the patterns of order proceeding from the Divine center of life; and that, in seeking this objective, man is hampered by a fallible intellect and vagrant will. Properly construed, this view is not only compatible with a due regard for human freedom, but demands it.

In 1959, Evans became head editorial writer of The Indianapolis News, rising to editor the following year—at 26, the nation's youngest editor of a metropolitan daily newspaper—a position he held until 1974. In 1971, Evans became a commentator for the CBS Television and Radio Networks, and in 1980 became a commentator for National Public Radio, the Voice of America, Radio America and WGMS in Washington, D.C.

In 1974, he became a nationally syndicated columnist for The Los Angeles Times syndicate. Barry Goldwater wrote that Evans "writes with the strength and conviction and authority of experience." In a 1975 radio address, Ronald Reagan cited Evans as "a very fine journalist." In 1977, he founded the National Journalism Center, of which he served as director until 2002. The center sponsors young journalists getting established in the nation's capital. Cliff Kincaid of Accuracy in Media was among those who began their careers through Evans' auspices. In 1980, Evans became an adjunct professor of journalism at Troy University in Troy, Alabama, where he held the Buchanan Chair of Journalism.

From 1981 to 2002, he was publisher of Consumers' Research magazine. Evans expressed his journalistic philosophy as follows:

I don't think that the way to correct a spin from the left is to try to impart a spin from the right. ... [A]n information flow distorted from the right would be just as much a disservice as distortion from the left. What we really should be after ... is accurate information. And I don't see what any conservative or anybody else for that matter has to fear from accurate information.

== Political activism ==
Evans was present at Great Elm, the family home of William F. Buckley in Sharon, Connecticut, at the founding of Young Americans for Freedom, where, on September 11, 1960, he drafted YAF's charter, the Sharon Statement. Some conservatives still revere this document as a concise statement of their principles.

From 1971 to 1977, Evans served as chairman of the American Conservative Union (ACU). He was one of the first conservatives to denounce U.S. President Richard M. Nixon, just a year into his first term, co-writing a January 1970 ACU report condemning his record. Under Evans' leadership, the ACU issued a July 1971 statement concluding, "the American Conservative Union has resolved to suspend our support of the Administration." Evans often joked that he "never liked Nixon until Watergate."

In June 1975, the ACU called upon Ronald Reagan of California to challenge incumbent Gerald R. Ford Jr., for the 1976 Republican presidential nomination. In June 1982, Evans and others met with now-president Reagan to warn him that the White House staff was undermining Reagan by making a deal with the Democratic Congress. (Reagan subsequently made such a deal in which for each $1 in higher taxes Congress promised $3 in spending cuts; Reagan delivered the tax hike, but Congress broke its promise and actually increased spending.)

In 1974, upon leaving the now-defunct The Indianapolis News after 15 years, he taught journalism at Troy University in Troy, Alabama for more than thirty years. From 1977 to 2002, he led the National Journalism Center in Washington, D.C., which was established with financial help from the conservative movement and brought promising beginning journalists to the nation's capital. He founded the Education and Research Institute. He was the president of the Philadelphia Society, a member of the Council for National Policy, sat on the advisory board of Young Americans for Freedom, and was a trustee of the Intercollegiate Studies Institute (ISI). He was an advisor to the National Tax Limitation Committee.

== Honors ==
Evans was awarded honorary doctorates from Syracuse University, John Marshall Law School, Grove City College and Francisco Marroquín University. He is a past winner of two Freedom Foundation awards for editorial writing and the National Headliners Club Award for "consistently outstanding editorial pages." Evans was also awarded the Heartland Institute's Heartland Freedom Prize, Accuracy in Media's Reed Irvine award for excellence in journalism, the American Spectator's Barbara Olson Award for Excellence & Independence in Journalism, the Ashbrook Center for Public Affairs' John M. Ashbrook Award, the ISI's Regnery Award for Distinguished Institutional Service and four Freedoms Foundation George Washington medals. Troy University's Hall School of Journalism hosts an annual M. Stanton Evans symposium named in his honor. There is also the M. Stanton Evans Alumni Award.

== Publications ==
=== Books ===
External videos
- Booknotes interview with Evans on The Theme Is Freedom, February 5, 1995, C-SPAN
- Presentation by Evans on Blacklisted by History (Nov. 8, 2007), C-SPAN
- Presentation by Evans on Stalin's Secret Agents, July 19, 2013, C-SPAN

- Revolt on the Campus. Washington, D.C.: Regnery (1961). Also at HathiTrust.
- The Fringe on Top: Political Wildlife Along the New Frontier. American Features (1963).
- The Liberal Establishment. New York: Devin-Adair (1965).
- The Politics of Surrender. New York: Devin Adair (1966).
- The Lawbreakers: America's Number One Domestic Problem. New Rochelle, New York: Arlington House (1968).
- The Future of Conservatism: From Taft to Reagan and Beyond. Holt, Rinehart and Winston (1968).
- Clear and Present Dangers: A Conservative View of America's Government. San Diego, Calif.: Harcourt Brace Jovanovich (1975). ISBN 015507685X.
- Civil Rights Myths and Communist Realities. Conservative Society of America (1965).
- The Theme Is Freedom: Religion, Politics, and the American Tradition. Washington, D.C.: Regnery (1996).
- Blacklisted by History: The Untold Story of Senator Joe McCarthy and His Fight Against America's Enemies. New York: Random House (2007). ISBN 978-1400081059.
- Stalin's Secret Agents: The Subversion of Roosevelt's Government, with Herbert Romerstein. New York: Simon & Schuster (2012).

=== Book contributions ===
- Introduction to Romney Behind the Image, by Antoni E. Gollan. Arlington, Virg.: Crestwood Books (1967).
