= National Journalism Center =

American political organization

- Formation: 1977
- Founder: M. Stanton Evans
- Headquarters: Washington, D.C.
- President: Scott Walker
- Website: https://yaf.org/national-journalism-center/

Logo of the National Journalism Center.

The National Journalism Center (NJC) is an American conservative political organization established in 1977 by journalist M. Stanton Evans. The NJC is part of the Young America's Foundation, and its president is Scott Walker, former Republican governor of Wisconsin. A former program director was Becket Adams, who has written for conservative publications including the Washington Examiner and the National Review. The NJC runs programs and internships for journalism students to educate them on professional journalism and conservative political issues and values.

== Internships ==
The 12-week Washington, D.C.–based program places interns at news outlets where they work four days a week. Placements have included Newsmax, The Daily Caller, The Washington Free Beacon, Catholic News Service, RealClearReligion, and Red Alert Politics. Participants also attend a weekly seminar at Young America's Foundation headquarters in Reston, Virginia. Additional reported program activities have included a six-week course on investigative reporting from a Free Beacon journalist and visits to National Rifle Association headquarters where interns shot AR-15 rifles and AK-47s. Though the program does not accept or deny placement in regard to political preference, intern placements are often in well-known conservative publications. Internships draw from the United States and Canada. Each intern is given a monthly stipend ($1,000 a month as of 2015).

== Notable alumni ==
Alumni of journalism include:

- Ann Coulter, conservative author, commentator and columnist
- Michael Fumento, conservative author and attorney
- John Fund, columnist, National Review Online and senior editor, The American Spectator
- Maggie Gallagher, conservative author, commentator and columnist
- Malcolm Gladwell, Canadian author, journalist and staff writer, The New Yorker
- Daniel T. Griswold, co-director of the Program on the American Economy and Globalization, Mercatus Center
- Greg Gutfeld, Fox News television host and author
- Steven F. Hayward, author and professor, Pepperdine University
- Michael Johns, national Tea Party movement co-founder, conservative commentator and former White House speechwriter
- Cliff Kincaid, director of the Center for Investigative Journalism, Accuracy in Media
- Rachel Marsden, conservative columnist and commentator
- Jason Mattera, conservative activist and writer
- William McGurn, columnist, The Wall Street Journal and former White House speechwriter
- Richard Miniter, founder, American Media Institute, author and journalist
- Brian Patrick Mitchell, writer and political theorist
- Terry Moran, former co-anchor, Nightline and journalist
- Doug Phillips, Christian author and attorney
- Debbie Schlussel, conservative author and commentator
