= Taking a Stand =

2015 book by Rand Paul

- The first edition
- Author: Rand Paul
- Language: English
- Genre: Politics
- Publisher: Center Street
- Publication date: May 26, 2015
- Publication place: United States
- Media type: Hardcover
- Pages: 320
- ISBN: 978-1-4555-4956-6

Taking a Stand: Moving Beyond Partisan Politics to Unite America is a book by U.S. Senator Rand Paul of Kentucky. The book was released on May 26, 2015, by Center Street, a main publishing division of Hachette Book Group. It happened to coincide with Paul's filibuster in the United States Senate of the PATRIOT Act provisions which were expected to expire at midnight on June 1, 2015.

Paul had previously engaged in a filibuster of the nomination of John O. Brennan as director of the Central Intelligence Agency in 2013, which led to his campaign team coining the phrase "Stand With Rand."

== Synopsis ==
The book is dedicated to Rand's wife, Kelley Paul.

The book starts with a description of Paul's filibuster and the enormous internet support he received with "millions" of tweets using the #StandWithRand hashtag.

Paul describes his early life, helping his father in the 1984 Senate election campaign and the 1988 presidential election, studying medicine, and finding the love of his life.

Paul discusses his ideas like auditing Fed, extending civil rights protections to voting right with allowing non-violent criminals vote in elections or school choice system.

== See also ==
- The Tea Party Goes to Washington
- Government Bullies
