= Jack Hunter (radio host) =

American radio host

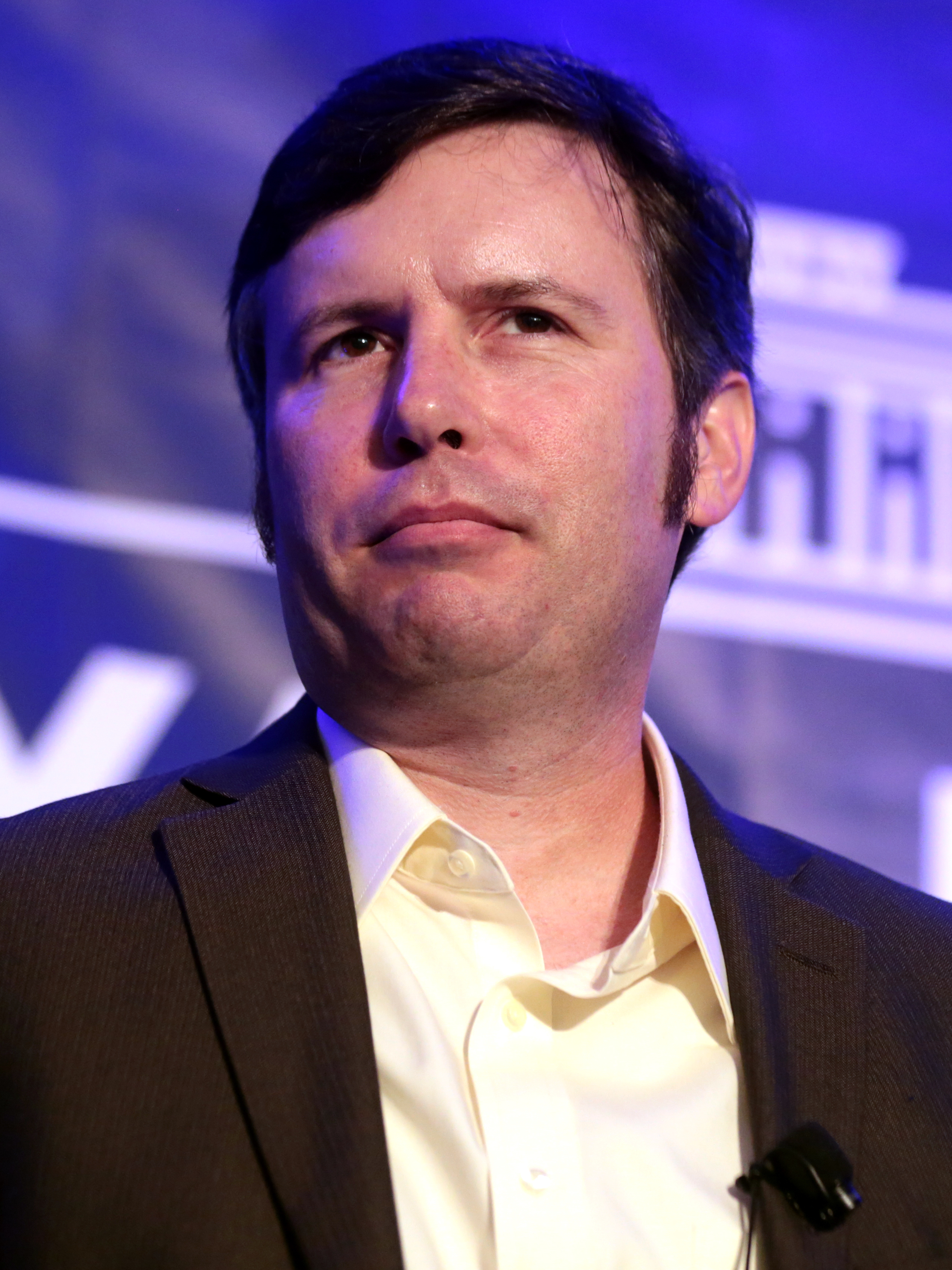
- Hunter in 2017
- Born: Jack William Hunter Jr. June 1, 1974 (age 52); Hanahan, South Carolina, U.S.
- Occupations: Radio host, writer, blogger
- Writing career
- Pen name: Southern Avenger, Big Baby

Jack William Hunter Jr. (born June 1, 1974) is an American radio host, political commentator and Politics Editor for Rare.us, a Washington, D.C.–based news website. He began his career in the late 1990s on alternative rock station WAVF 96.1 FM using the moniker "Southern Avenger", an anonymous pro wrestler/superhero-style character. In 2007, Hunter began appearing every Tuesday and Friday morning on WTMA News-Talk 1250 AM, and contributed to a weekly column to the Charleston City Paper. Hunter was also an aide to U.S. Senator Rand Paul, whom Hunter helped write the book The Tea Party Goes to Washington. He is perhaps best known for racist writings that caused a major media controversy for his boss, Senator Paul.

Hunter resigned from Rand Paul's staff in what the Senator called a "mutual decision." In a November 2013 article for Politico, Hunter repudiated his former views, writing "I'm not a racist; I just played one on the radio."

== Political views ==
Hunter is known for often providing commentary from libertarian and conservative viewpoints, with a particular focus on Ron Paul's 2008 and 2012 presidential campaigns as well as Senator Rand Paul's influence within the Republican Party. Hunter has said he sees the liberal internationalism that is found in the Democratic Party and the neoconservatism prominent in the Republican Party to be ultimately indistinguishable from one another, which has led to criticism from both the mainstream left and the mainstream right.

Hunter supports a non-interventionist foreign policy and considers the current U.S. foreign policy a disaster. He is also critical of neoconservatism. As a columnist for the Charleston City Paper, Hunter praised "paleolibertarian" Taki's Magazine, quoting and linking to the writing of Richard Spencer advocating for nationalism and isolationism in the GOP.

== Controversy over writings on race, American Civil War ==
Critics on both the political left and the political right condemned Hunter for the past remarks, and some political analysts said that Senator Rand Paul's continuing association with Hunter would imperil Paul's prospects as a contender in the 2016 United States presidential election.

On July 18, Hunter's former longtime editor at the Charleston City Paper, Chris Haire, wrote an article sharply critical of both Hunter and Paul, denouncing Hunter for having asked Haire, long before the current controversy had erupted, to remove from the internet dozens of past columns that Hunter said no longer reflected his views. Haire called the request cowardly and said that Hunter had made it solely for appearances—to help Paul in the 2016 presidential campaign. Noting controversial writings by Hunter "in support of racially profiling Hispanics, praising white supremacist Sam Francis, blast[ing] the House of Representative's apology for slavery" and calling upon black Americans to "apologize to white people for their high crime rates", Haire characterized Hunter as "the most common kind of racist, the one that doesn't realize that he is one".

By July 21, less than two weeks after the original Washington Free Beacon article had been published, Hunter had resigned from his position on Paul's staff. Paul called the resignation "a mutual decision," agreeing that Hunter's past views had become a distraction.

In a statement written in response to the controversy, Hunter wrote that he was "embarrassed by some of the comments I made precisely because they do not represent me today." He also expressed abhorrence of racism and criticized the Free Beacon article as "not accurately reflect[ing]" his character or views. In June 2015, Hunter wrote a piece in The Daily Beast condemning his past promotion of Confederate iconography in light of the Charleston church shooting.
