= Rare (website) =

American news and opinion website

Rare.us
- Company type: Private
- Industry: News Publishing
- Founded: 2013
- Defunct: 2024
- Headquarters: Nashville, Tennessee, United States
- Key people: James S. Robbins (former deputy editor); Jack Hunter (former politics editor); Yasmeen Sami Alamiri (former political reporter)
- Owner: Savage Ventures
- Website: http://www.rare.us

Rare is an American news and opinion website based in Washington, D.C. Rare was launched as a startup in 2013 by a team of journalists, marketers and business executives at Atlanta-based Cox Media Group. Rare's slogan is “America's News Feed", describing itself as a "news, political, and lifestyle social content hub".

The publication's first editor in chief was Brett M. Decker, formerly an editorial page writer for The Wall Street Journal and editorial page editor of The Washington Times. Will Alford, one of the site's original founders and a former newsroom director at The Atlanta Journal-Constitution, became acting editor after Decker left. Betsi Fores, formerly of The Daily Caller, became Rare's managing editor, and Jack Hunter, former aide to U.S. Senator Rand Paul, became the politics editor after resigning from his Senate job.

== History ==
Rare launched at a Newseum gala on April 15, 2013, and acquired 25 million page views within the first year. The website was aimed at a younger, center-right audience, and early contributors brought in by Decker's team included Jeb Bush, Ted Cruz, Rand Paul and Grover Norquist. Rare has been described as libertarian-conservative and has been compared to the websites Independent Journal Review, BuzzFeed, and The Huffington Post.

Their original tagline, "Red is the Center" referred to an editorial position where conservative thinking was at the heart of American success. In 2014, their tagline became “America's News Feed”, reflecting more mainstream, high-traffic, popular content targeting a younger, socially engaged audience.

In March 2018, editors for the site said Cox had decided to cease publication. Following a mass layoff of over 50 staffers, the site and its affiliated web properties were purchased by Texas-based Wide Open Media Group.

The site ceased publishing once again in 2021, after its parent was acquired by Publishers Clearing House. It was acquired by Nashville-based Savage Ventures and relaunched in April 2022. In 2023, a CNN report described the new iteration of Rare as one of several "fringe right-wing" news sites with inflammatory and misleading content that Microsoft AI was serving to consumers. Rare editor Troy Smith responded, calling CNN "left-wing fringe" and saying that mainstream media fail to cover President Joe Biden honestly.

Rare ceased publication in early 2024, with its last social media posts in February. Previously-published content on the site is no longer accessible and the main page of the site is a list of aggregated headlines of stories published in May 2024.
