= Yasmeen Sami Alamiri =

Iraqi American journalist

Yasmeen Sami Alamiri is an Iraqi American journalist. She currently serves as the director of communications for Mercy Corps. Prior to her role at Mercy Corps, she was the senior news editor for PBS NewsHour. In that capacity, she also served as the executive producer for PBS News Weekly, a first-of-its-kind weekly news magazine show for PBS' YouTube channel.

Alamiri won Peabody awards for PBS' reporting on the Jan. 6, 2021 attacks on the U.S. Capitol and on coverage of the war in Gaza.

She became a White House correspondent in 2007. In that capacity, Alamiri was one of the founding members of the White House foreign press pool. She has covered U.S. politics and policy for a variety of news organizations, such as Rare, BBC, WJLA-TV, Al Arabiya, and Fair Observer. She served on the Board of Directors for The Education for Peace in Iraq Center (EPIC). Alamiri was also recognized as a member of the Poynter Leadership Academy for Women in Media 2021 cohort.

She is a graduate of James Madison University and American University.
