= Education for Peace in Iraq Center =

Enabling Peace in Iraq Center (EPIC)
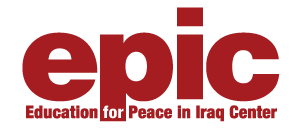
- Formation: 1998
- Legal status: Nonprofit organization
- Location: Washington, DC
- Region served: Iraq
- Founder and Executive Director: Erik Gustafson
- Website: http://www.epic-usa.org

The Enabling Peace in Iraq Center (EPIC) is a charitable organization that works with Iraqi civil society to provide relief, monitor Iraqi affairs to better inform public policy, and enhance understanding of Iraq's story. EPIC was founded by veterans of the Gulf War in 1998 in Washington, DC including executive director Erik Gustafson.

== History ==
Trade and economic sanctions against Iraq and the Saddam Hussein regime throughout the mid-1990s contributed to conditions of inadequate healthcare, few public education opportunities, and a critical shortage of food across the country. Iraqis who sought to convince Hussein to comply with UN demands or conspire to remove him from power were frequently jailed or killed by the regime.

In that context, EPIC was founded in 1998 by veterans of the Gulf War. Early organizers created a grassroots movement to share the concerns of everyday Iraqis living under sanctions with Members of Congress, thought leaders, and the American public. Leading up to the U.S.-led 2003 invasion of Iraq, EPIC urged the American public to support a peaceful approach and to prevent war through the use of e-mail petitions and a speakers bureau of volunteer military veterans who discussed their opposition to the invasion on college campuses and in front of civic organizations. In the aftermath of the invasion, including the years of sectarian violence and occupation of territory by the so-called Islamic State, EPIC's mission shifted to include humanitarian work on-the-ground.

== Current programs ==
EPIC currently conducts the following programs in three categories, according to its website:

=== Enhance understanding ===
- Blog - EPIC's Blog includes written analyses of urgent socio-political issues facing the country, such as anti-corruption reform, infrastructure development, and access to healthcare.
- Iraq Matters Podcast - The Iraq Matters podcast involves interviews conducted with notable Iraqis, humanitarian experts, academics, and government officials. Episodes are released at least quarterly and are available on the organization's website.
- Iraq Speakers' Bureau - The Speakers' Bureau enables those who have a close connection to Iraq to share their knowledge and experience with the American public, helping to correct misconceptions about Iraq and the needs of refugees fleeing violence. Iraq thought leaders are connected to local speaking engagements wherever they live to help tell Iraq's story.

=== Monitor the crisis ===
- Iraq Security and Humanitarian Monitor - The weekly e-mail publication and Blog post is available to policymakers, scholars, aid workers, journalists, and anyone interested in analysis of ongoing humanitarian, political, and security developments in Iraq. The publication uses firsthand accounts and Arabic and Kurdish-language news outlets as its source material.

=== Provide relief ===
- Emergency Response - The organization provides funding to cover emergency medical needs in areas recently cleared of ISIS militants, including Mosul.
- Soccer Salam - EPIC leads a consortium of non-profits who deliver humanitarian relief in the form of food, water filtration, medicine, and other essentials to displaced families in Iraq under the banner of "Soccer Salam." The program includes donations of soccer balls and equipment for children whenever humanitarian aid is distributed.

== Board of directors ==
As of June 2017, the Enabling Peace in Iraq Center's board of directors is composed by the following officers and members:

- Soren Sudhof, President
- Marion Abboud, Secretary
- Yasmeen Alamiri
- Zach Brooks-Miller
- Peter Kjeldgaard
- David Slater
- Bilal Wahab

== See also ==
- EPIC Website
- Iraq Security and Humanitarian Monitor (ISHM)
- EPIC on Facebook
- EPIC on Twitter
