= The Tea Party Goes to Washington =

2011 book by Rand Paul

- The first edition
- Author: Rand Paul
- Language: English
- Genre: Politics
- Publisher: Center Street
- Publication date: February 22, 2011
- Publication place: United States
- Media type: Hardcover
- Pages: 272
- ISBN: 978-1-4555-0311-7

The Tea Party Goes to Washington is a book by U.S. Senator Rand Paul of Kentucky. The book, co-written by radio host Jack Hunter, describes the Tea Party movement's impact in the 2010 midterm elections in the United States, and ultimately their impact on the entire political system.

Paul was elected to the United States Senate on November 2, 2010, along with the help of various Tea Party activists across Kentucky, and has strongly embraced the group. Paul considers himself a member of the Tea Party, and has since founded the Tea Party Caucus in the United States Senate, along with several other senators, including senators Mike Lee, Jim DeMint and Jerry Moran.

The book was released on February 22, 2011, and is published by Center Street, a main publishing division of Hachette Book Group.

== Reception ==
In a review of the book, historian Thomas Woods wrote:

The Tea Party Goes to Washington ... is a much bolder book than Rand skeptics would have expected, and it is also a strategically clever book ... To be sure, Rand’s anecdotes from the campaign trail and from his days as a boy growing up in the Paul household are well executed and engaging, rather than cloying and phony as in so many political books. More importantly, Senator Paul is willing to stake out positions—on the Patriot Act, the U.S. Constitution, the federal budget, Austrian economics, and so on—that are not exactly standard fare for a man in his position.

== See also ==
- Government Bullies
