= Electoral history of Rand Paul =

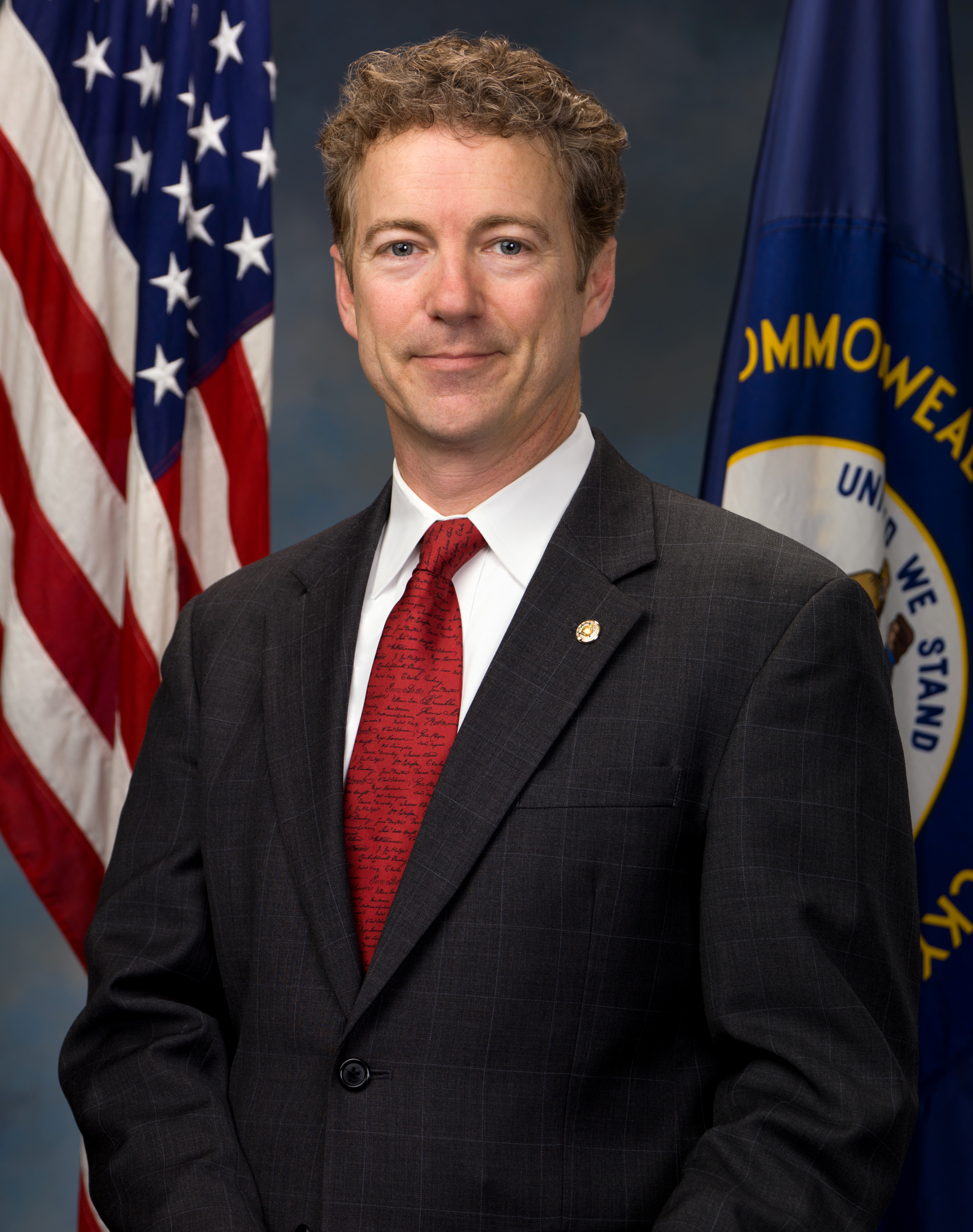
Paul in 2011

Rand Paul, a United States senator from Kentucky since 2011, has campaigned in multiple elections.

== 2010 United States Senate election in Kentucky ==
=== Republican primary ===
2010 United States Senate Republican primary in Kentucky
Party	Candidate	Votes	%
Republican	Rand Paul	206,986	58.8%
Republican	Trey Grayson	124,864	35.4%
Republican	Bill Johnson	7,861	2.2%
Republican	John Stephenson	6,885	2.0%
Republican	Gurley L. Martin	2,850	0.8%
Republican	Jon J. Scribner	2,829	0.8%
Total votes		352,275	100.0%

=== General election ===
2010 United States Senate election in Kentucky
Party	Candidate	Votes	%	±%
Republican	Rand Paul	755,411	55.69%	+5.03%
Democratic	Jack Conway	599,617	44.26%	−5.12%
Total votes		1,354,833	100.0%	N/A
Republican hold				

== 2016 Republican Party presidential primaries ==
=== Primaries ===
Cumulative results of the 2016 Republican Party presidential primaries
Party	Candidate	Votes	%
Republican	Donald Trump	14,015,993	44.95%
Republican	Ted Cruz	7,822,100	25.08%
Republican	John Kasich	4,290,448	13.76%
Republican	Marco Rubio	3,515,576	11.27%
Republican	Ben Carson	857,039	2.75%
Republican	Jeb Bush	286,694	0.92%
Republican	Rand Paul	66,788	0.21%
Republican	Mike Huckabee	51,450	0.16%
Republican	Carly Fiorina	40,666	0.13%
Republican	Chris Christie	57,637	0.18%
Republican	Jim Gilmore	18,369	0.06%
Republican	Rick Santorum	16,627	0.05%

=== 2016 Republican National Convention ===
2016 Republican National Convention delegate count
Party	Candidate	Votes	%
Republican	Donald Trump	1,441	58.3%
Republican	Ted Cruz	551	22.3%
Republican	Marco Rubio	173	7.0%
Republican	John Kasich	161	6.5%
Republican	Ben Carson	9	0.4%
Republican	Jeb Bush	4	0.2%
Republican	Rand Paul	1	<0.1%
Republican	Mike Huckabee	1	<0.1%
Republican	Carly Fiorina	1	<0.1%

== 2016 United States Senate election in Kentucky ==
=== Republican primary ===
2016 United States Senate Republican primary in Kentucky
Party	Candidate	Votes	%
Republican	Rand Paul (incumbent)	169,180	84.79%
Republican	James Gould	16,611	8.33%
Republican	Stephen Slaughter	13,728	6.88%
Total votes		199,519	100.0%

=== General election ===
2016 United States Senate election in Kentucky
Party	Candidate	Votes	%	±%
Republican	Rand Paul (incumbent)	1,090,177	57.27%	+1.58%
Democratic	Jim Gray	813,246	42.73%	−1.53%
Write-in		42	0.00%	N/A
Total votes		1,903,465	100.0%	N/A
Republican hold				

== 2022 United States Senate election in Kentucky ==
=== Republican primary ===
2022 United States Senate Republican primary in Kentucky
Party	Candidate	Votes	%
Republican	Rand Paul (incumbent)	333,051	86.4%
Republican	Valerie Frederick	14,018	3.6%
Republican	Paul V. Hamilton	13,473	3.5%
Republican	Arnold Blankenship	10,092	2.6%
Republican	Tami Stanfield	9,526	2.5%
Republican	John Schiess	5,538	1.4%
Total votes		385,698	100.0%

=== General election ===
2022 United States Senate election in Kentucky
Party	Candidate	Votes	%	±%
Republican	Rand Paul (incumbent)	913,257	61.81%	+4.54%
Democratic	Charles Booker	564,231	38.18%	−4.55%
Independent	Charles Lee Thomason	110	0.01%	N/A
Independent	Billy Ray Wilson	24	0.00%	N/A
Total votes		1,477,622	100.0%	N/A
Republican hold				
