= Kelley Paul =

American political consultant and writer (born 1963)

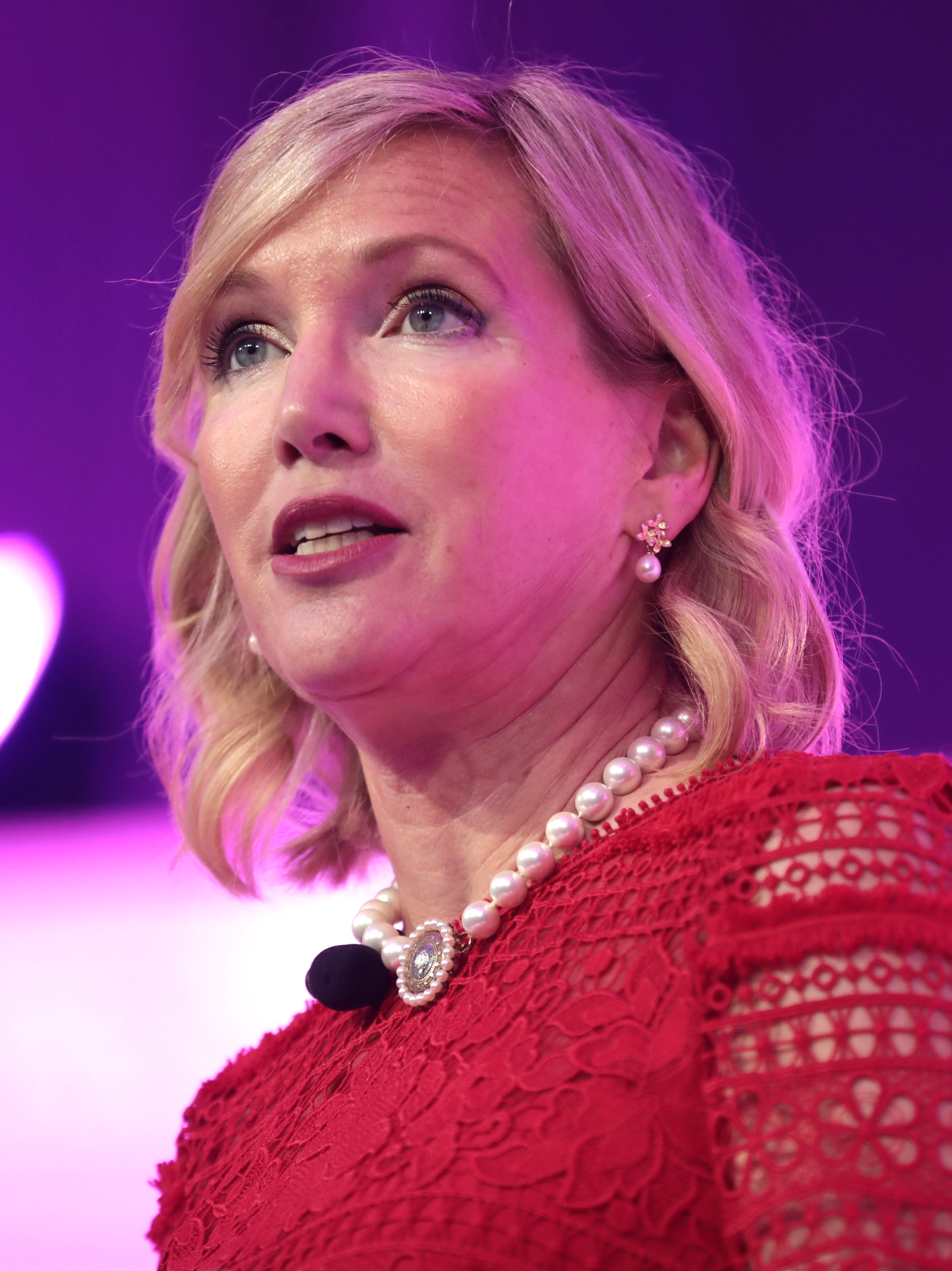
- Paul in 2021
- Born: Kelley Ashby; September 3, 1963 (age 63); Russellville, Kentucky, U.S.
- Education: Rhodes College (BA)
- Political party: Republican
- Spouse: Rand Paul (m. 1990)
- Children: 3
- Relatives: Ron Paul (father-in-law)

Kelley Ashby Paul (born September 3, 1963) is an American political consultant and freelance writer. She has worked as a consultant for the Strategy Group for Media, and she published a book titled True and Constant Friends in April 2015. Her husband is U.S. senator Rand Paul of Kentucky.

Paul is a graduate of Rhodes College. She is actively engaged in fundraising for veterans charities, in addition to her work for a political consulting firm.

== Early life and education ==
Kelley Ashby was born in Russellville, Kentucky, the daughter of Lillian (née Wessell) and Hilton Ray Ashby, a military family. Paul has described her grandmother, an Irish immigrant who traveled the United States as a teenager, as one of her greatest life influences. Paul spent much of her early life moving around the country, describing herself as an "Air Force brat". Her family lived for a few years in Turkey as well. She graduated from Russellville High School, where she was a member of the cheerleading squad. Following her graduation from high school, Paul attended Rhodes College, where she majored in communication and English.

In 1988, Kelley met Rand Paul at a backyard oyster roast in Atlanta. Rand Paul was completing a surgical rotation at Georgia Baptist Hospital while working on his medical degree at the Duke University School of Medicine. At first Kelley thought that Rand was a teenager, and was unaware that he was actually a 26-year-old doctor. They began dating while Rand Paul completed his rotation program, and Rand asked Kelley to move back with him to North Carolina and try to find a job in the Durham area so that they could continue being together. On October 20, 1990, the couple married, and eventually moved to Kentucky in 1993 when an ophthalmologist position opened up in the city of Bowling Green.

Paul would go on to help her husband with producing newsletters and mailings for his practice, running the payroll, keeping the books, and managing a remodel of the building where he saw patients.

== Career ==
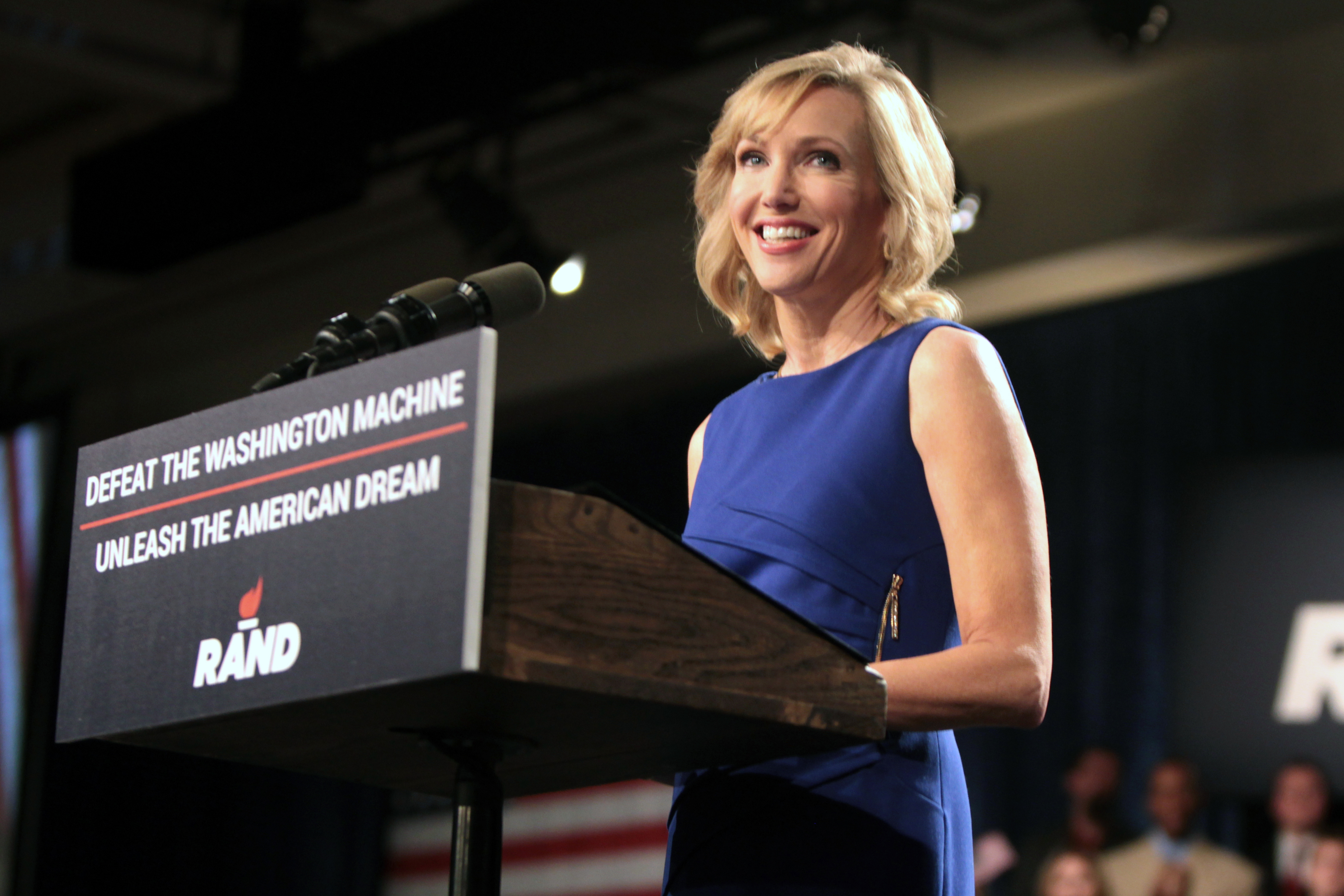
Kelley Paul introducing her husband at his presidential announcement in Louisville, Kentucky.

Leading up to her husband's election to the United States Senate, Paul began freelance writing, and focusing more on her own career as a private citizen. In addition, she also worked for the political consulting firm The Strategy Group for Media, with one of her clients being then-U.S. Senate candidate Ted Cruz of Texas. She also maintains a board position at Helping a Hero, a charity that builds houses for wounded war veterans.

During her husband's campaign, Paul gave political speeches on behalf of her husband, including speaking to Republican women's groups, and participating in commercial advertisements on behalf of his campaign.

In the lead up to Rand Paul's decision to run for President of the United States, Kelley Paul began writing a book focused on her long lasting friendships, as well as her own family history titled True and Constant Friends: Love and Inspiration from Our Grandmothers, Mothers, and Friends. Many political consultants have referred to Kelley Paul as Senator Paul's "secret weapon" and describing her as a "very confident person, very comfortable, and she complements [Rand] well". She played a key role in the decision regarding whether her husband would run for president, but stated that it was a much easier decision than deciding to run for U.S. Senate in mid-2009.

In late September 2015, Paul filed for her husband to appear on the ballot in the South Carolina primary. In January 2016, after Democratic presidential candidate Hillary Clinton came under criticism for her husband Bill Clinton's past relationship with White House intern Monica Lewinsky, Paul said in an interview that Bill Clinton was "fair game" since he had become involved with his wife's campaign and that while it may not have been just, "I think we all know that's the way it is in politics now". It was reported that she would be joining her husband in touring Iowa that month in an effort to garner more support for his campaign.

In 2018, Paul advocated for passage of the First Step Act, meeting with senators and conducting public interviews (including appearing on Fox News) to try to build support for the bill. Paul says she was enlightened on the need for criminal justice reform by her husband Rand and father-in-law Ron Paul, whose advocacy "opened [her] eyes to the extent of how bad our system is broken and how people are suffering through that".

On August 11, 2021, Kelley Paul's husband Rand Paul disclosed that Kelley had purchased a stake in Gilead Sciences, which manufactures an antiviral drug used to treat COVID-19, on February 26, 2020.

== Personal life ==
Kelley Paul and Rand Paul were married on October 20, 1990, and have three sons.
