= Rand Paul =

American politician (born 1963)

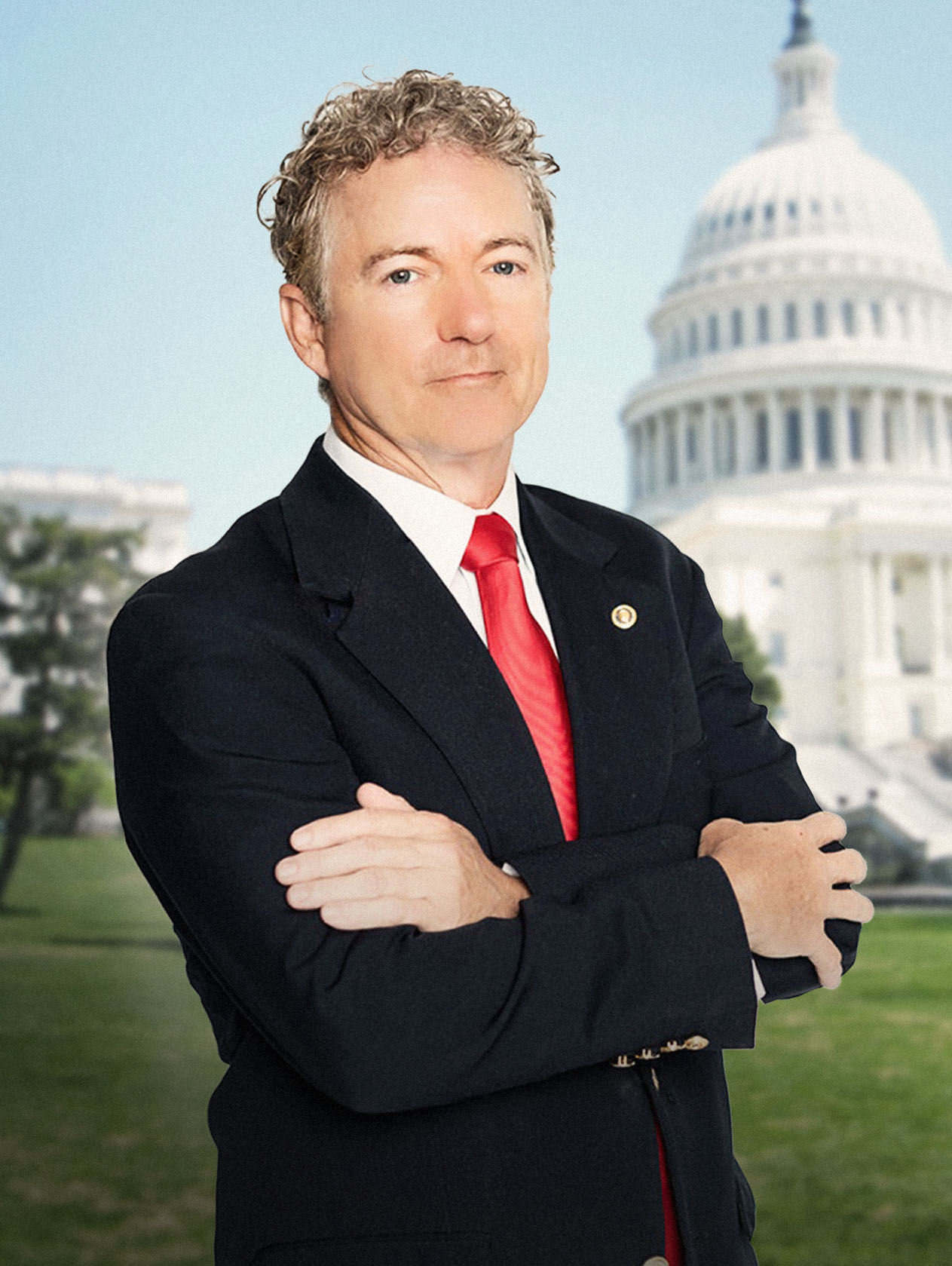
- Official portrait, 2025

United States Senator from Kentucky
- Incumbent
- Assumed office January 3, 2011 Serving with Mitch McConnell
- Preceded by: Jim Bunning
Senate positions
Chair of the Senate Homeland Security Committee
Incumbent
Assumed office January 3, 2025
Preceded by	Gary Peters
Ranking Member of the Senate Homeland Security Committee
In office January 3, 2023 – January 3, 2025
Preceded by	Rob Portman
Succeeded by	Gary Peters
Ranking Member of the Senate Small Business Committee
In office February 3, 2021 – January 3, 2023
Preceded by	Ben Cardin
Succeeded by	Joni Ernst

Personal details
- Born: Randal Howard Paul; January 7, 1963 (age 63) Pittsburgh, Pennsylvania, U.S.
- Party: Republican
- Spouse: Kelley Ashby (m. 1990)
- Children: 3
- Relatives: Ron Paul (father)
- Education: Baylor University (attended); Duke University (MD)
- Website: Senate website Campaign website
- Paul's voice Paul opposing military aid for Ukraine; Recorded May 12, 2022

Randal Howard Paul (born January 7, 1963) is an American politician serving as the junior United States senator from Kentucky since 2011. A member of the Republican Party, he is the chair of the Senate Homeland Security Committee.

Born in Pittsburgh, Pennsylvania, Paul has described himself as a constitutional conservative and a supporter of the Tea Party movement. His libertarian views have been compared to those of his father, three-time presidential candidate and 12-term U.S. representative from Texas, Ron Paul. Paul attended Baylor University and is a graduate of the Duke University School of Medicine. He was a practicing ophthalmologist in Bowling Green, Kentucky, from 1993 until his election to the U.S. Senate in 2010. He was re-elected in 2016 and won a third term in 2022. Paul was a candidate for the Republican nomination in the 2016 U.S. presidential election. Paul is set to become Kentucky's senior senator when Mitch McConnell retires in 2027.

== Early life ==
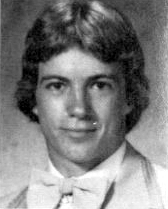
Paul's 1981 high school yearbook photo

Randal Howard Paul was born on January 7, 1963, in Pittsburgh, Pennsylvania, to Carol (née Wells) and Ron Paul, who is also a politician and physician. The middle child of five, his siblings are Ronald "Ronnie" Paul Jr., Lori Paul Pyeatt, Robert Paul, and Joy Paul LeBlanc.

Paul was baptized in the Episcopal Church and identified as a practicing Christian as a teenager.

Despite his father's libertarian views and strong support for individual rights, the novelist Ayn Rand was not the inspiration for his first name. Growing up, he went by "Randy", but his wife shortened it to "Rand".

The Paul family moved to Lake Jackson, Texas, in 1968, where he was raised and where his father began a medical practice and for a period of time was the only obstetrician in Brazoria County.

When Rand was 13, his father Ron Paul was elected to the United States House of Representatives. That same year, Paul attended the 1976 Republican National Convention, where his father headed Ronald Reagan's Texas delegation. The younger Paul spent several summer vacations interning in his father's congressional office. In his teenage years, Paul studied the Austrian economists that his father respected, as well as the writings of Objectivist philosopher Ayn Rand. Paul went to Brazoswood High School and was on the swimming team and played defensive back on the football team.

Paul attended Baylor University from fall 1981 to summer 1984, where he studied biology and English and was enrolled in the honors program. He regularly contributed to The Baylor Lariat student newspaper and completed his pre-med requirements in two and a half years. Paul left Baylor without completing his baccalaureate degree, when he was accepted into his father's alma mater, the Duke University School of Medicine, which, at the time, did not require an undergraduate degree for admission to its graduate school. He earned a Doctor of Medicine degree in 1988 and completed his residency in 1993.

== Medical career ==
After completing his residency at Duke University in ophthalmology, Paul moved to Bowling Green, Kentucky, where he has been practicing since 1993. He worked for Downing McPeak Vision Centers for five years. In 1998, he joined a private medical group practice, the Graves Gilbert Clinic, in Bowling Green, for 10 years. In 2008, Paul formed his own private practice across the street from John Downing, his former employer at Downing McPeak. After his election to the U.S. Senate, he merged his practice with Downing's medical practice.

Paul has faced two malpractice lawsuits between 1993 and 2010; he was cleared in one case while the other was settled for $50,000. His medical work has been praised by Downing and he has medical privileges at two Bowling Green hospitals. In April 2020, after recovering from COVID-19, Paul began volunteering at a hospital in Bowling Green, assisting them in their response to the COVID-19 pandemic in Kentucky.

Paul specializes in cataract and glaucoma surgeries, LASIK procedures, and corneal transplants. As a member of the Bowling Green Noon Lions Club, Paul founded the Southern Kentucky Lions Eye Clinic in 2009 to help provide eye surgery and exams for those who cannot afford to pay. Paul won the Melvin Jones Fellow Award for Dedicated Humanitarian Services from the Lions Club International Foundation for his work establishing the Southern Kentucky Lions Eye Clinic.

=== National Board of Ophthalmology ===
In 1995, Paul was certified to practice by the American Board of Ophthalmology (ABO).

In 1999, he incorporated the National Board of Ophthalmology (NBO) to offer an alternative certification system, at a cost substantially lower than that of the ABO. Board members were Paul, his wife, and his father-in-law. His father-in-law, the board's secretary, stated "I never did go to any meetings ... There was really nothing involved. It was more just a title than anything else, for me". By Paul's estimate, about 50 or 60 doctors were certified by the NBO. The NBO was not accepted as an accrediting entity by organizations such as the American Board of Medical Specialties, and its certification was considered invalid by many hospitals and insurance companies. Paul did not file the required paperwork with the Kentucky Secretary of State's office for the NBO's renewal to operate in 2000. He recreated the board in 2005, but it was again dissolved in 2011.

Paul maintained his own ABO certification from 1995 to 2005. Specialty certification does not affect physician licensure, and Paul's medical license has been valid continuously, with no board actions, since June 1993.

== Political activism ==
Paul was head of the local chapter of the Young Conservatives of Texas during his time at Baylor University. In 1984, Paul took a semester off to aid his father's campaign in the Republican primary for the 1984 U.S. Senate election in Texas, which the elder Paul eventually lost to fellow Representative Phil Gramm, who would go on to defeat Democratic nominee Lloyd Doggett in the general election.

While attending Duke University School of Medicine, Paul volunteered for his father's presidential campaign.

In response to the breaking of President George H. W. Bush's promise not to raise taxes, Paul founded the North Carolina Taxpayers Union in 1991. In 1994, he founded the anti-tax organization Kentucky Taxpayers United (KTU), and was chair of the organization from its inception. He has often cited his involvement with KTU as the foundation of his involvement with state politics. The group examined Kentucky legislators' records on taxation and spending and encouraged politicians to publicly pledge to vote uniformly against tax increases.

Paul managed his father's successful 1996 congressional campaign, in which the elder Paul returned to the House after a twelve-year absence. The elder Paul defeated incumbent Democrat-turned-Republican Greg Laughlin in the Republican primary, despite Laughlin's support from the National Republican Congressional Committee and Republican leaders such as Newt Gingrich and George W. Bush.

The Wall Street Journal reported in 2010 that, although Paul had told a Kentucky television audience as recently as September 2009 that KTU published ratings each year on state legislators' tax positions and that "we've done that for about 15 years", the group had stopped issuing its ratings and report cards after 2002 and had been legally dissolved by the state in 2000 after failing to file registration documents.

Paul spoke on his father's behalf when his father was campaigning for office, including throughout the elder Paul's run in the 2008 presidential election, during which Rand campaigned door-to-door in New Hampshire and spoke in Boston at a fundraising rally for his father on the 234th anniversary of the Boston Tea Party.

In February 2014, Paul joined the Tea Party-affiliated conservative advocacy group FreedomWorks in filing a class action lawsuit charging that the federal government's bulk collection of Americans' phone records metadata is a violation of the Fourth Amendment of the U.S. Constitution. Commenting on the lawsuit at a press conference, Paul said, "I'm not against the National Security Agency, I'm not against spying, I'm not against looking at phone records... I just want you to go to a judge, have an individual's name and [get] a warrant. That's what the Fourth Amendment says." He also said there was no evidence the surveillance of phone metadata had stopped terrorism. Critics, including Harvard University law professor Alan Dershowitz and Steven Aftergood, the director of the American Scientists' Project on Government Secrecy, called the lawsuit a political "stunt". Paul's political campaign organization said that the names of members of the public who went to Paul's websites and signed on as potential class-action participants would be available in the organization's database for future campaign use.

On the announcement of the filing of the lawsuit, Mattie Fein, the spokeswoman for and former wife of attorney Bruce Fein, complained that Fein's intellectual contribution to the lawsuit had been stolen and that he had not been properly paid for his work. Paul's representatives denied the charge, and Fein issued a statement saying that Mattie Fein had not been authorized to speak for him on the matter and that he had in fact been paid for his work on the lawsuit.

Paul is co-author of a book entitled The Tea Party Goes to Washington (2011) and also the author of Government Bullies (2012). In 2013 and 2014, Paul was included in a list of the world's 100 most influential people by Time magazine, to which he is a contributor.

== Election to U.S. Senate ==
=== Primary campaign ===
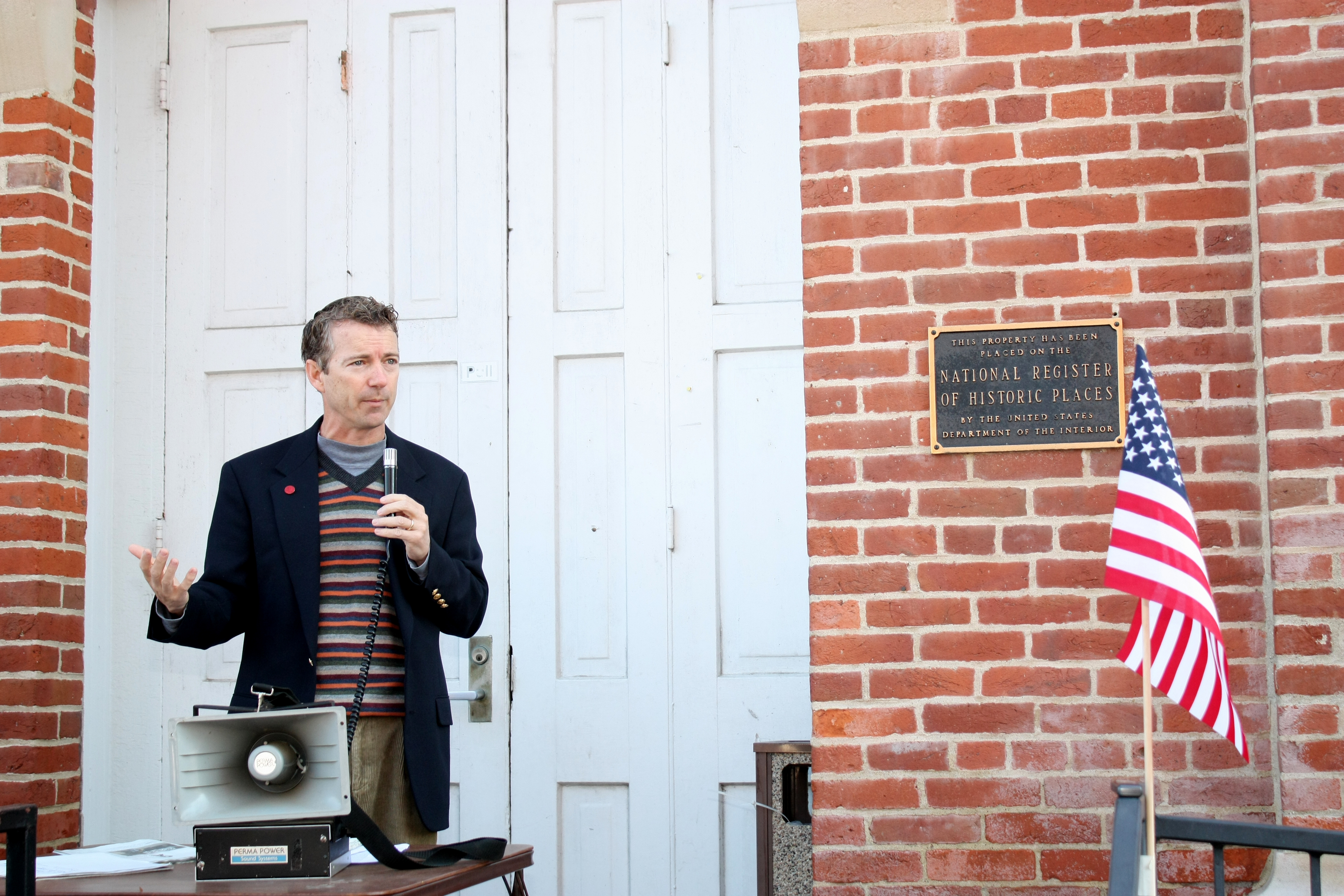
Paul speaking at a Tea Party rally in Hawesville, Kentucky, on November 21, 2009

In early 2009, some supporters of his father sought to draft Paul in a bid to replace beleaguered Republican U.S. senator Jim Bunning. Paul's potential candidacy was discussed in the Los Angeles Times and locally in the Kentucky press. Paul's father said, "Should Senator Bunning decide not to run, I think Rand would make a great U.S. Senator." On April 15, Paul gave his first political speech as a potential candidate at a Tea Party rally held in his town of Bowling Green, where more than 700 people had gathered in support of the Tea Party movement.

On May 1, Paul said that if Bunning, whose fundraising matched his poor numbers in opinion polling for the upcoming election, declined to seek a third term, he would almost certainly run in the Republican Party primary to succeed him, and formed an exploratory committee soon after, while still promising to stay out of the race if Bunning ultimately decided to run for reelection.

On July 28, Bunning announced that he would not run for reelection in the face of insufficient fundraising. The announcement left only Paul and Kentucky secretary of state Trey Grayson as the remaining candidates for the Republican nomination, with Paul announcing on August 5 that he would officially run for the U.S. Senate as a Republican.

On August 20, Paul's supporters planned a moneybomb to kick off his campaign. The official campaign took in $433,509 in 24 hours. His website reported that this set a new record in Kentucky's political fundraising history in a 24-hour period. A second money bomb was held on September 23 to counter a Washington, D.C., fundraiser being held for Grayson by 23 Republican U.S. senators. The theme was an Ultimate Fighting Championship "fight" between "We the People" and the "D.C. Insiders". Later in the campaign, Paul claimed his pledge to not take money from lobbyists and senators who had voted for the bailout was only a "primary pledge"; he subsequently held a fundraiser in Washington, D.C., with the same senators who had been the target of the September 23 moneybomb. Paul ended up raising some $3 million during the primary period. Paul's fundraising was aided by his father's network of supporters.

Although Grayson was considered the frontrunner in July, Paul found success characterizing Grayson as a "career politician" and challenging Grayson's conservatism. Paul ran an ad in February that made an issue out of Grayson's 2008 admission that he voted for Bill Clinton when he was 20 years old. James Dobson, a Christian evangelical figure, endorsed Grayson on April 26, 2010, based on the advice of what Dobson described as "senior members of the GOP", but on May 3, the Paul campaign announced that Dobson had changed his endorsement to Paul after Paul and some Paul supporters had lobbied Dobson insisting on Paul's social conservative bona fides. On May 18, Paul won the Republican primary with 59% of the vote to Grayson's 35%.

=== General campaign ===
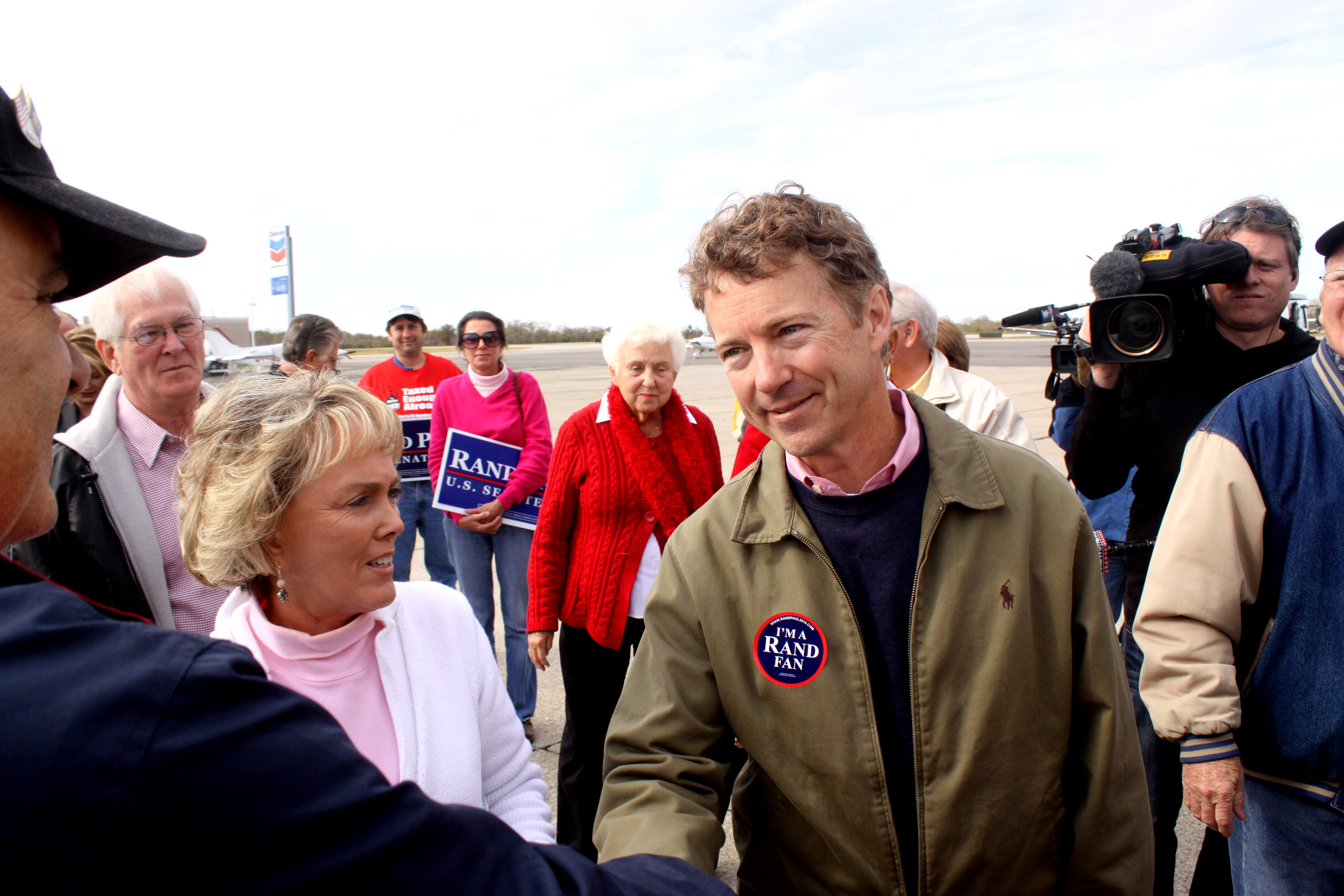
Paul greeting supporters at Bowman Field in Louisville, Kentucky, on November 1, 2010

In the 2010 general election, Paul faced Kentucky attorney general Jack Conway. The campaign attracted $8.5 million in contributions from outside groups, of which $6 million was spent to help Paul and $2.5 million to help Conway. This money influx was in addition to the money spent by the candidates themselves: $6 million by Paul and $4.7 million by Conway.

On June 28, Paul supporters held their first post-primary online fundraising drive, this time promoted as a "money blast".

Paul's campaign got off to a rough start after his comments on the Civil Rights Act of 1964 stirred controversy. Paul stated that he favored nine out of ten titles of the Civil Rights Act of 1964, but that had he been a senator during the 1960s, he would have raised some questions on the constitutionality of Title II of the Act. Paul said that he abhors racism, and that he would have marched with Martin Luther King Jr. to repeal Jim Crow laws. He later released a statement declaring that he would have voted for the Act and stated "unequivocally ... that I will not support any efforts to repeal the Civil Rights Act of 1964". Later he generated more controversy by characterizing statements made by Obama administration officials regarding the Deepwater Horizon oil spill cleanup as sounding "un-American".

== U.S. Senate (2011–present) ==
=== 112th Congress (2011–2013) ===
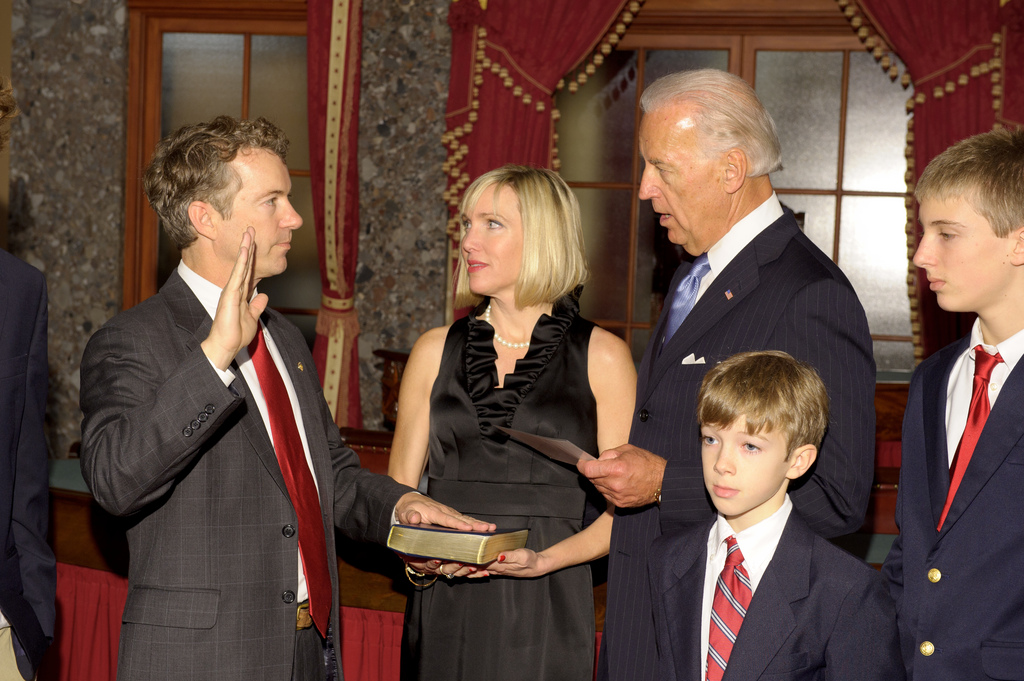
Paul being sworn in as a senator by Vice President Joe Biden, along with his family, in the Old Senate Chamber in the U.S. Capitol, January 2011

Paul was sworn in on January 5, 2011, along with his father, who was simultaneously in the House of Representatives.

Paul was assigned to be on the Energy and Natural Resources; Health, Education, Labor and Pensions; Homeland Security and Government Affairs; and Small Business committees. Paul also formed the Senate Tea Party Caucus with Jim DeMint and Mike Lee as its inaugural members. His first legislative proposal was to cut $500 billion from federal spending in one year. This proposal included cutting the Department of Education by 83 percent and the United States Department of Homeland Security by 43 percent, as well as folding the Department of Energy into the Department of Defense and eliminating the Department of Housing and Urban Development. Seven independent agencies would be eliminated, and food stamps would be cut by 30 percent. Under Paul's proposal, defense spending would be reduced by 6.5 percent and international aid would be eliminated. He later proposed a five-year budget plan intended to balance the budget.

In February, Paul was one of two Republicans to vote against extending three key provisions of the USA PATRIOT Act (roving wiretaps, searches of business records, and conducting surveillance of "lone wolves" — individuals not linked to terrorist groups).

On March 2, Paul was one of nine senators to vote against a stopgap bill that cut $4 billion from the budget and would temporarily prevent a government shutdown, saying that it did not cut enough from the budget. One week later, he voted against the Democratic and Republican budget proposals to keep funding the federal government, saying that both bills did not cut enough spending. Both bills failed to pass the Senate. He later voted against stopgap measures on March 17 and April 8, both of which passed the senate.

On April 14, he was one of 19 senators to vote against a budget that cut $38.5 billion from the budget and funded the government for the remainder of the fiscal year.

Paul voiced opposition to U.S. intervention in the Libyan Civil War and has criticized President Barack Obama for not gaining congressional consent for Operation Odyssey Dawn. During the debt ceiling crisis, the Senator stated that he would only support raising the debt ceiling if a balanced budget amendment was enacted. Paul was a supporter of the Cut, Cap and Balance Act, which was tabled by Democratic opposition. On August 3, Paul voted against a bill that would raise the debt ceiling.

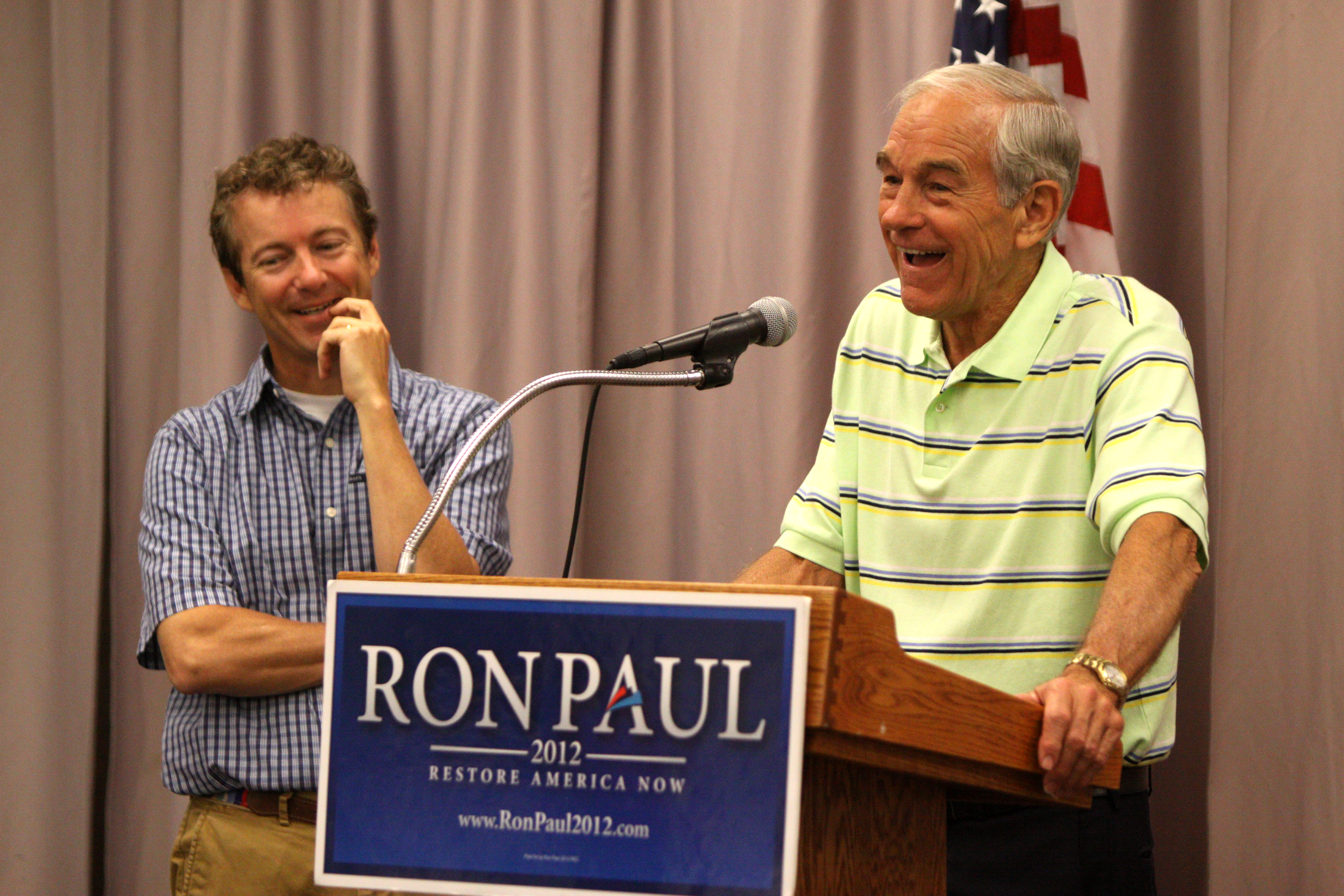
Paul campaigning with his father, Ron Paul, for his 2012 presidential campaign in Waterloo, Iowa, on August 10, 2011

On September 7, Paul called for a vote of no confidence in United States Secretary of the Treasury Timothy Geithner. Later that month, Paul blocked legislation that would strengthen safety rules for oil and gas pipelines, because, he stated, the bill was not strong enough. In October, Paul blocked a bill that would provide $36 million in benefits for elderly and disabled refugees, saying that he was concerned that it could be used to aid domestic terrorists. This was in response to two alleged terrorists who came to the United States through a refugee program and were receiving welfare benefits when they were arrested in 2011 in Paul's hometown of Bowling Green. Paul lifted his hold on the bill after Democratic leaders promised to hold a congressional hearing into how individuals are selected for refugee status and request an investigation on how the two suspects were admitted in the country through a refugee program.

In June 2012, Paul endorsed Mitt Romney after it became apparent that he would be the Republican nominee for the 2012 presidential election. However, he was later vocal about his disagreements with Romney on a number of policies.

=== 113th Congress (2013–2015) ===
For the 113th Congress, Paul was added to the Foreign Relations committee and retained his spot on the Health, Education, Labor and Pensions, Homeland Security and Government Affairs, and Small Business committees.

On March 6–7, 2013, Paul engaged in a filibuster to delay voting on the nomination of John O. Brennan as the Director of the Central Intelligence Agency. Paul questioned the Obama administration's use of drones and the stated legal justification for their potential use within the United States. Paul held the floor for 12 hours and 52 minutes. He ceded to several Republican senators and Democratic senator, Ron Wyden, who generally also questioned drone usage. Paul said his purpose was to challenge drone policy in general and specifically as it related to noncombatants on U.S. soil. He requested a pledge from the Administration that noncombatants would not be targeted on U.S. soil. Attorney General Eric Holder responded that the President is not authorized to deploy extrajudicial punishment without due process, against non-combatant citizens. Press Secretary Jay Carney read Holder's letter, indicating president Obama's support, "The president has not and would not use drone strikes against American citizens on American soil" Press Paul answered that he was "quite happy" with the response. The filibuster was ended with a cloture vote of 81 to 16, and Brennan was confirmed by the Senate with a vote of 63 to 34.

In March 2013, Paul, with Senators Ted Cruz and Mike Lee, threatened another filibuster, this one opposing any legislative proposals to expand federal gun control measures. The filibuster was attempted on April 11, 2013, but was dismissed by cloture, in a 68–31 vote. Also in March 2013, Paul endorsed fellow Kentucky Republican Senator Mitch McConnell's 2014 re-election campaign. McConnell had previously hired Paul's 2010 campaign manager, Jesse Benton, as his own campaign manager. Paul's endorsement was seen as a major win for McConnell in avoiding a challenge in the Republican primary.

In response to Detroit's declaration of bankruptcy, Paul stated he would not allow the government to attempt to bail out Detroit. In a phone interview with Breitbart News on July 19, 2013, Paul said, "I basically say he is bailing them out over my dead body because we don't have any money in Washington." Paul said he thought a federal bailout would send the wrong message to other cities with financial problems.

In September, Paul stated that the United States should avoid military intervention in the ongoing Syrian Civil War. In an op-ed, Paul disputed the Obama administration's claims that the threat of military force caused Syria's government to consider turning over its chemical weapons, instead arguing that the opposition to military action in Syria, and the delay that it caused, led to diplomatic progress.

In October 2013, Paul was the subject of some controversy when it was discovered that he had plagiarized from Wikipedia part of a speech in support of Virginia gubernatorial candidate Ken Cuccinelli. Referencing the movie Gattaca, Paul quoted almost verbatim from the Wikipedia article about the film without citing the source. Evidence soon surfaced that Paul had copied sentences in a number of his other speeches nearly verbatim from other authors without giving credit to the original sources, including in the speech he had given as the Tea Party rebuttal to the president's 2013 State of the Union Address. In addition, a three-page-long passage of Paul's book Government Bullies was taken directly from an article by the conservative think tank The Heritage Foundation. When it became apparent that Paul's op-ed in The Washington Times on mandatory minimums and related testimony he had given before the Senate Judiciary Committee both contained material that was virtually identical to an article that had been published by another author in The Week a few days earlier, The Washington Times said that the newspaper would no longer publish the weekly column Paul had been contributing to the paper. After a week of almost daily news reports of new allegations of plagiarism, Paul said that he was being held to an "unfair standard", but would restructure his office in order to prevent mistakes in the future, if that would be what it would take "to make people leave me the hell alone."

In response to political turmoil in Ukraine in early 2014, Paul initially said that the United States should remain mindful of the fact that although the Cold War is over, Russia remains a military power with long-range nuclear missiles. He said that the United States should try to maintain a "respectful relationship with Russia" and avoid taking actions that the Russians might view as a provocation, such as seeking to have Ukraine join NATO or otherwise interfering in Russia's relationship with Ukraine.

Two weeks later, after the Russian parliament authorized the use of military force in Ukraine and Russian President Vladimir Putin ordered military exercises along Russia's border with Ukraine, Paul began taking a different tone. He wrote: "Vladimir Putin's invasion of Ukraine is a gross violation of that nation's sovereignty and an affront to the international community ... Putin must be punished for violating the Budapest Memorandum, and Russia must learn that the U.S. will isolate it if it insists on acting like a rogue nation." He said that the United States and European allies could retaliate against Russia's military aggression without any need for military action. He urged that the United States impose economic sanctions on Russia and resume an effort to build defensive anti-missile installations in Poland and the Czech Republic. He also called for the United States to take steps as a counterweight to Russia's strategic influence on Europe's oil and gas supply, such as lifting restrictions on new exploration and drilling for fossil fuels in the United States along with immediate approval of the controversial Keystone Pipeline, which he said would allow the United States to ship more oil and gas to Europe if Russia attempts to cut off its own supply to Europe.

Paul played a leading role in blocking a treaty with Switzerland that would enable the IRS to conduct tax evasion probes, arguing that the treaty would infringe upon Americans' privacy. Paul received the 2014 Distinguished Service Award from the Center for the National Interest (formally called the Nixon Center) for his public policy work.

In response to reports that the CIA infiltrated the computers of the Senate Intelligence Committee, Paul called for the firing of CIA Director John O. Brennan. In December 2014, Paul supported the actions taken by the Obama administration to change United States policy towards Cuba and to ease trade restrictions with that country.

=== 114th Congress (2015–2017) ===
In the beginning of 2015, Paul re-introduced the Federal Reserve Transparency Act. Paul also introduced the FAIR Act, or Fifth Amendment Integrity Restoration Act, which would restrict civil forfeiture proceedings. Paul spoke for ten and a half hours on May 20, 2015, in opposition to the reauthorization of Section 215 of the Patriot Act. Sections of the Patriot Act were prevented from being reauthorized on June 1.

After the death of Antonin Scalia in February 2016, on February 15, Paul indicated that he would oppose any nomination by President Obama to replace the late Supreme Court Justice.

During a press briefing on May 6, 2016, President Obama called on Paul to stop "blocking the implementation of tax treaties that have been pending for years", arguing that they assisted law enforcement in off shore investigations into tax evasion. Paul advocated for the abolition of gun-free zones during a speech to the National Rifle Association of America on May 20, citing repeated tragedies occurring in these locations. On June 6, Paul spoke of introducing legislation to cease Selective Service, three days after the death of Muhammad Ali, after whom he intended to name the legislation in tribute.

=== 115th Congress (2017–2019) ===
In March 2017, Paul introduced the Stop Arming Terrorists Act that would prohibit the use of United States government funds to provide assistance to Al Qaeda, Jabhat Fateh al-Sham, and the Islamic State of Iraq and the Levant (ISIL) and to countries supporting those organizations. On March 16, Senator John McCain (Rep) accused Paul of being an agent of Vladimir Putin after Paul objected to adding Montenegro to NATO. Paul responded the following day by saying McCain "makes a really, really strong case for term limits", suggesting McCain had become "a little unhinged" as a result of his seniority. On April 7, McCain said he did not pay attention to any of Paul's rhetoric and that the latter did not have "any real influence" in the United States Senate.

Paul questioned President Trump's April 2017 missile strike to Syria by saying, "While we all condemn the atrocities in Syria, the United States was not attacked." He said that further action should not be taken without congressional authorization.

Paul was one of 22 senators to sign a letter to President Donald Trump urging him to have the United States withdraw from the Paris Agreement in May 2017. According to The Guardian, Paul has received over $250,000 from oil, gas and coal interests since 2012. In July, Rand Paul joined Reps. Justin Amash (R-MI), Thomas Massie (R-KY), John Duncan Jr. (R-TN) and Sen. Bernie Sanders (I-VT) in opposing a bill that would impose new economic sanctions against Russia, Iran, and North Korea. President Trump opposed the bill, pointing out that relations with Russia were already "at an all-time and dangerous low". He did, however, sign the bill though likely out of political pressure.

Paul confirmed in an October 2017 interview he would not vote for the Republican budget in the Senate unless billions in spending were removed from the plan: "If leadership is unwilling to compromise with somebody who is concerned about the debt, then they deserve to lose."

In February 2018, Republican senators introduced an immigration framework akin to that proposed by President Trump and with his support that called for $25 billion being provided for border security in exchange for a pathway to citizenship for 1.8 million immigrants brought into the US illegally. Paul was one of fourteen Republican senators to vote against the proposal.

FiveThirtyEight, which tracks congressional votes, found that Paul had voted with Donald Trump's positions the least out of all Republicans, only voting with him 74% of the time by August 2018. In December 2018, in the wake of court filings implicating President Trump's involvement in campaign finance violations, including an attempt to buy a woman's silence, Paul played down the alleged violations and said that they should not be "over-criminalized." Paul said that the campaign finance violations were "an error in filing paperwork or not categorizing" and that going after such violations would turn the U.S. into a "banana republic, where every president gets prosecuted and every president gets thrown in jail when they're done with office."

==== Affordable Care Act repeal ====
Paul introduced a bill on January 25, 2017, that sought to replace the Affordable Care Act which included each person's having a tax credit of $5,000 and not requiring everyone to have coverage, unlike Obamacare.

On March 2, after marching to the House of Representatives side of Capitol Hill, Paul was filmed knocking on a door while demanding to see their copy of the replacing and repealing the Affordable Care Act bill. Paul spoke with President Trump over the phone on March 6, Paul telling him that the repeal and replacement of the Affordable Care Act should be two separate bills. Two days later, Paul said Republicans were united in repealing the Affordable Care Act but divided in their stances on its replacement. On March 12, Paul accused House Speaker Paul Ryan of being misleading in portraying supporters of the American Health Care Act of 2017 as not being negotiable, and three days later, March 15, furthered that Ryan was "selling" President Trump "a bill of goods" that he had not explained fully to the president.

After the bill was pulled by Republican leaders from a vote, Paul released a statement on March 24 thanking House conservatives for rebelling "against ObamaCare Lite." Later, on April 2, Paul golfed with Trump and Budget Director Mick Mulvaney at the Trump National Golf Club in Virginia, where they discussed a variety of topics, including healthcare.

Paul told reporters on June 15 that he was willing to vote for a partial repeal, but not the implementation of new Republican entitlement programs, which he identified as present in both House and Senate versions of the bill. Paul also told reporters on September 11 that he did not believe the Graham-Cassidy bill would pass. Paul tweeted on September 15 that Graham-Cassidy retained "90% of Obamacare" and dubbed it "more Obamacare Lite".

On September 19, Paul asserted the Graham-Cassidy bill as immortalizing the Affordable Care Act and "a big government boondoggle of a trillion dollars of spending" that Republicans should abandon in favor of pursuing measures that would allow for health insurance to be purchased across state lines. On September 22, after President Trump tweeted that "Rand Paul, or whoever votes against Hcare Bill, will forever (future political campaigns) be known as 'the Republican who saved Obamacare'", Paul responded that he would not be coerced into supporting Graham-Cassidy with bribes or bullying.

=== 116th Congress (2019–2021) ===
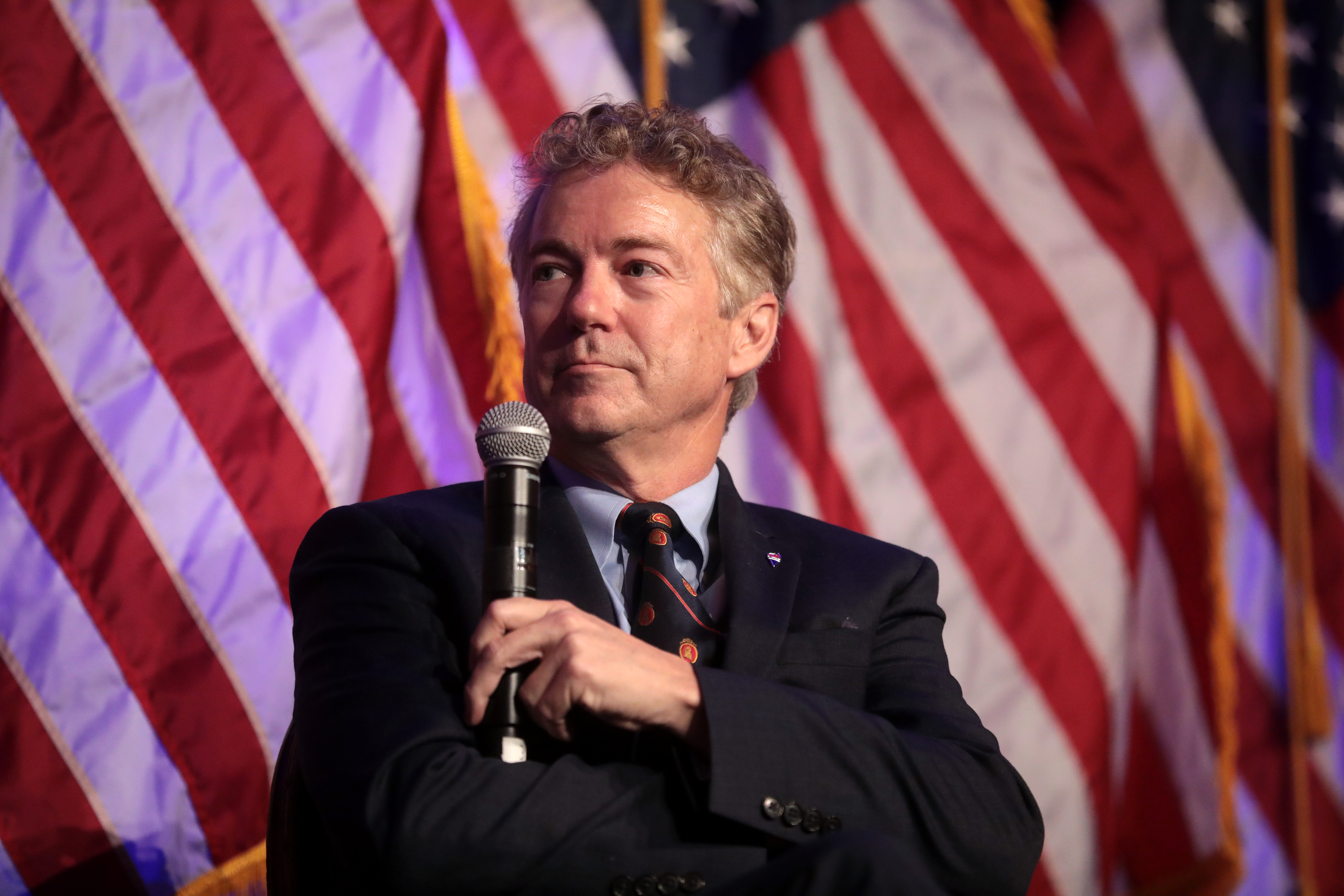
Paul at the 2019 Turning Point USA Winter Gala at Mar-a-Lago

In January 2019, Paul condemned Senator Mitt Romney for writing an editorial criticizing President Trump. Paul said that Romney's criticism of Trump's character was bad for the country and for the Republican Party.

On July 17, 2019, Paul blocked Senator Kirsten Gillibrand's motion for unanimous consent on a bill renewing the September 11th Victim Compensation Fund along with Utah Senator Mike Lee. The fund was estimated to run out by the end of the year; the bill would renew it until the year 2090. Paul argued that he was not blocking the bill, but rather seeking a vote on an amendment that would offset the new spending by other spending cuts due to the deficit. In a segment on Fox News, which went viral, comedian Jon Stewart and 9/11 first responder John Feal rebuked Paul, accusing him of hypocritical "fiscal responsibility virtue signalling", for delaying passage of the bill, while at the same time he voted in favor of the Tax Cuts and Jobs Act of 2017, which increased the deficit. In response, Paul said he has always insisted on "pay-go provisions" for any increase in spending, including for disaster relief funding, and called Stewart uninformed and a part of a "left-wing mob".

On November 4, 2019, Paul called on the media to reveal the secret identity of Trump's Ukraine quid pro quo whistleblower after threatening to reveal the name himself.

In February 2020, Paul criticized YouTube for removing a video of his floor speech about the impeachment trial of Donald Trump. His speech contained a controversial question for impeachment manager Adam Schiff and counsel for the president: "Are you aware that House Intelligence Committee staffer Shawn Misko had a close relationship with [...] when at the National Security Council together?"

On February 26, 2020, Paul's wife purchased between $1,000 and $15,000 worth of stock in Gilead Sciences, a pharmaceutical company that produces an antiviral drug used to treat COVID-19, before the threat from the coronavirus was fully understood by the public; his disclosure of this transaction came 16 months after the legal deadline set forth in the Stock Act, a law that combats insider trading. Paul's office stated that the disclosure form was filled up on time, but by mistake was not submitted. This purchase was the only stock in an individual company that Paul or his wife bought in the previous 10 years.

In September 2020, Paul was the lone Republican to vote against the COVID-19 aid package introduced by Senator Mitch McConnell, joining the Democrats who unanimously voted against it. Paul's grievance with the bill was the accumulation to the debt it would have triggered.

After the 2020 presidential election, Paul refused to accept Democratic candidate Joe Biden's victory against Trump and falsely claimed that the election was "stolen".

=== 117th Congress (2021–2023) ===
Paul has referred to Dr. Anthony Fauci as a "government official" representing science during committee hearings on the COVID-19 pandemic.

Initially, Paul insisted that the 2020 elections were fraudulent, and in December 2020, claimed that the election "in many ways was stolen." Later, he accepted the state-certified electors that named Biden.

In a press release and during the Electoral College session to count the vote, which followed the January 6 United States Capitol attack, Paul argued that the electoral college is an indispensable friend of democracy in checking the danger of centralized power in deciding elections. He additionally condemned the attack while it occurred, calling it "violence and mob rule" and "un-American". He blamed the rioters as setting back election reform discussions and asked them to "just stop it." Later that month, Paul continued to make false claims of fraud in the 2020 election and refused to say that the election was not stolen. In the subsequent second impeachment trial of Trump, which sought to convict him on charges of incitement of insurrection, Paul questioned the constitutionality of it due to Trump having left office by the time it reached the Senate, as well as defending him against the charges, "I want Democrats to raise their hands if they have ever given a speech that says 'take back,' 'fight for your country,' who hasn't used the words fight figuratively?" Once Trump was impeached in January 2021, Paul introduced a motion to the Senate declaring the impeachment to be unconstitutional. Five Republicans joined all 50 Democrats to defeat the motion 55 to 45. With 45 Republican senators supporting him, Paul stated the impeachment was 'dead on arrival'. Paul formally voted against the charges on February 13, 2021.

In January 2022, a video resurfaced of Paul advising medical students at the University of Louisville in 2013, during which he said "misinformation works, so try to trick your opponents".

In May 2022, Paul blocked a bipartisan bill that would provide $40 billion in aid for Ukraine during the Russian invasion, citing the need to create a special inspector general to oversee how the aid is spent.

=== 118th Congress (2023–2025) ===
In March 2023, Paul gained particular media attention after he crossed party lines and blocked fellow Republican Senator Josh Hawley's "No TikTok on United States Devices Act", which would ban the app TikTok in the United States. In a statement afterwards, Paul said he believes a ban would be a violation of First Amendment rights, adding that it would not necessarily protect the users' information because U.S.-based tech companies have failed to secure data before.

On January 11, 2024, Paul announced that he had a major announcement about the 2024 Republican Party presidential primaries planned for the following morning. The next day, Paul delivered an anti-endorsement against Nikki Haley, launching a website called "Never Nikki". In particular, Paul noted his opposition toward Haley's interventionist foreign policy, especially increasing taxpayer funding for Ukraine and aligning with Republicans that might want to "bomb Tehran tomorrow." He added that he liked Donald Trump, Ron DeSantis, Vivek Ramaswamy, and Robert F. Kennedy Jr., but he declined to officially endorse any of them.

Paul was named one of the "biggest social media stars in Congress" by Politico alongside New York Rep. Alexandria Ocasio-Cortez, Vermont Sen. Bernie Sanders, Louisiana Sen. John Kennedy, and Texas Rep. Brandon Gill.

=== Committee assignments ===
- Committee on Foreign Relations
  - Subcommittee on Near East, South Asia, Central Asia and Counterterrorism
  - Subcommittee on Europe and Regional Security Cooperation
  - Subcommittee on Multilateral International Development, Multilateral Institutions, and International Economic, Energy and Environmental Policy
  - Subcommittee on State Department and USAID Management, International Operations and Bilateral International Development
- Committee on Health, Education, Labor, and Pensions
  - Subcommittee on Children and Families (chairman)
  - Subcommittee on Employment and Workplace Safety
- Committee on Homeland Security and Governmental Affairs
  - Permanent Subcommittee on Investigations
  - Subcommittee on Emergency Management, Intergovernmental Relations, and the District of Columbia (chairman)
- Committee on Small Business and Entrepreneurship (Ranking Member)

On February 3, 2021, Paul was named a ranking member of the Small Business and Entrepreneurship Committee.

== 2016 presidential campaign ==
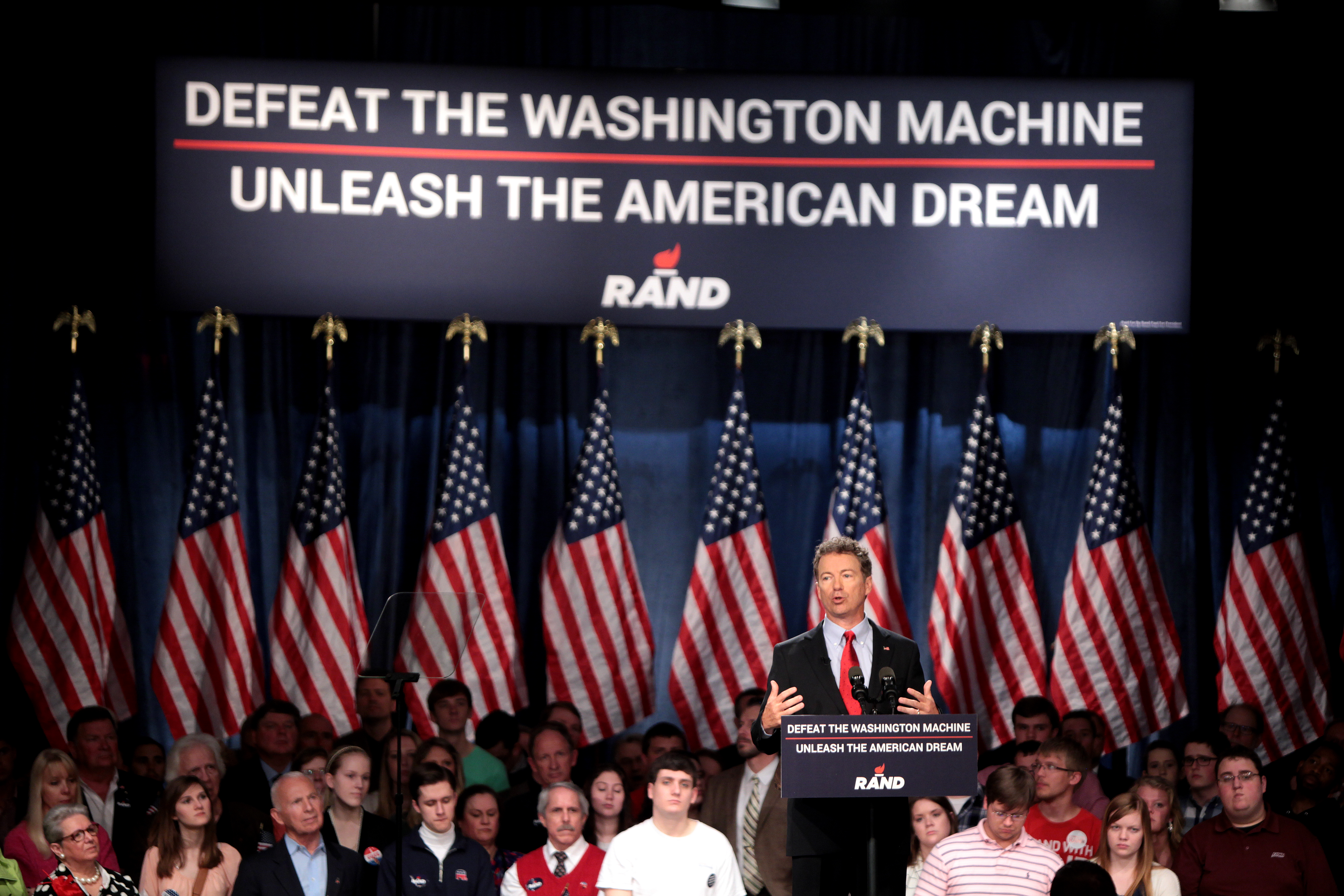
Paul announces his candidacy for president

=== Background ===
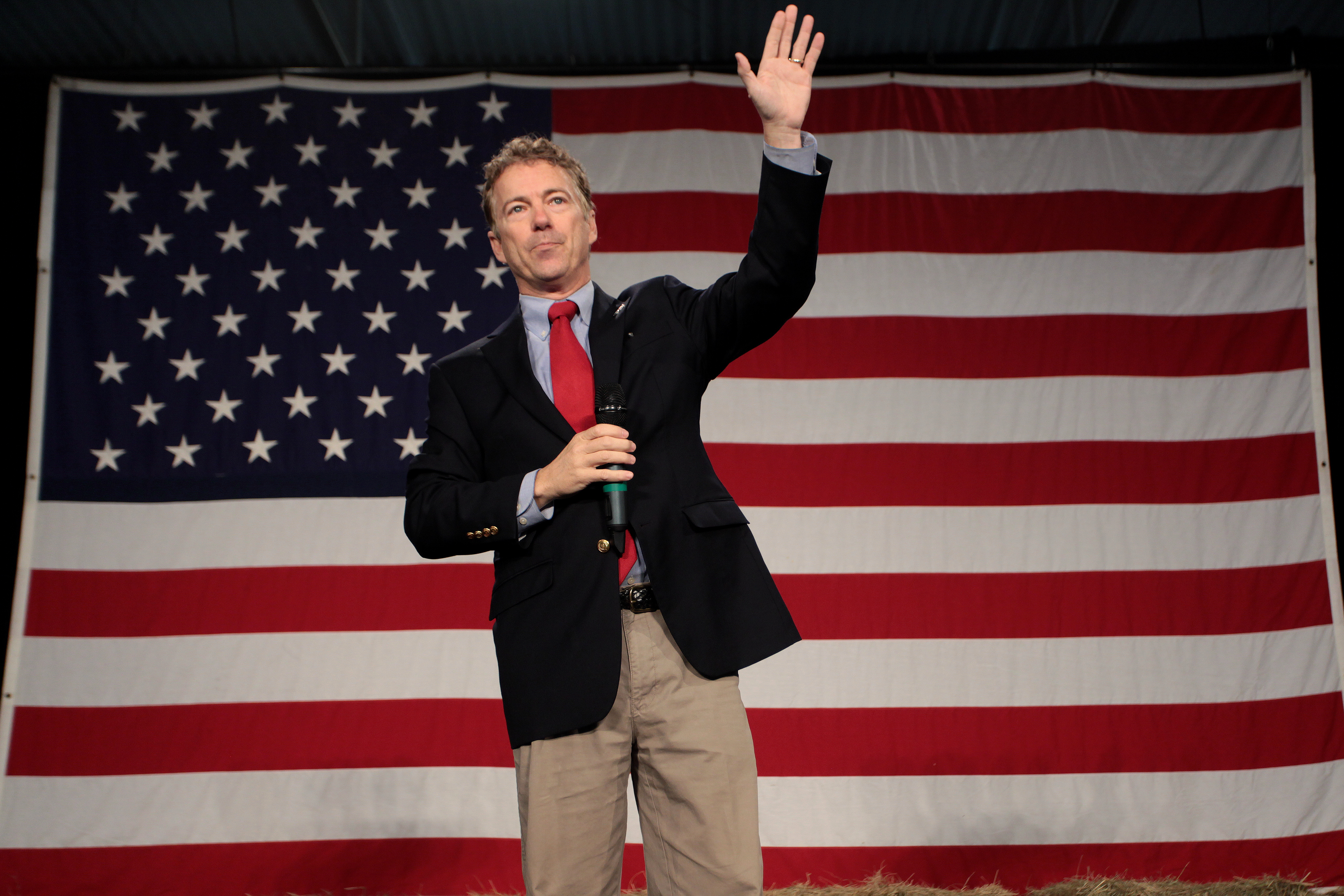
Paul speaking at a campaign rally in Des Moines, Iowa, October 2015

Paul was considered a potential candidate for the Republican nomination for the presidency of the United States since at least January 2013. He delivered the Tea Party response to President Barack Obama's State of the Union address on February 13, 2013, while Marco Rubio gave the official Republican response. This prompted some pundits to call that date the start of the 2016 Republican primaries. That year, he spoke at the Conservative Political Action Conference in Washington D.C., where he won the 2016 presidential straw poll. Paul went on to win the straw poll for the next two years as well, leading to some considering Paul to be a front runner for the nomination, although CPAC attendees are typically considered younger and more libertarian-minded than average Republican voters.

In a speech at the GOP Freedom Summit in April 2014, Paul insisted that the GOP has to broaden its appeal in order to grow as a party. To do so, he said it cannot be the party of "fat cats, rich people and Wall Street" and that the conservative movement has never been about rich people or privilege, "we are the middle class", he said. Paul also said that conservatives must present a message of justice and concern for the unemployed and be against government surveillance to attract new people to the movement, including the young, Hispanics, and black voters.

During the 2014 election, Paul launched a social media campaign titled "Hillary's Losers" which was meant to highlight many of the Democratic candidates that lost their bids for the U.S. Senate despite endorsements from Hillary Clinton. Clinton was also a candidate for President and eventually won the Democratic Party's nomination, going on to lose to Donald Trump in the general election.

Paul began to assemble his campaign team, setting up campaign offices and hiring his campaign manager in the beginning of 2015, fueling speculation that he was preparing to enter the presidential race. Paul officially announced his presidential candidacy on April 7, 2015. Within a day of his announcement, Paul raised $1 million.

=== Senate re-election ===
In April 2011, Paul filed to run for re-election to his Senate seat in 2016. Had he become the Republican presidential (or vice-presidential) nominee, state law would prohibit him from simultaneously running for re-election. In March 2014, the Republican-controlled Kentucky Senate passed a bill that would allow Paul to run for both offices, but the Democratic-controlled Kentucky House of Representatives declined to take it up.

Paul spent his own campaign money in the 2014 legislative elections, helping Republican candidates for the State House in the hopes of flipping the chamber, thus allowing the legislature to pass the bill (Democratic Governor Steve Beshear's veto could be overridden with a simple majority). However, the Democrats retained their 54–46 majority in the State House. Paul has since given his support to the idea that the Kentucky Republican Party could decide to hold a caucus rather than a primary, potentially giving Paul more time to decide whether he should run for U.S. Senator or continue a potential bid for president.

=== Exit from presidential campaign ===
Paul announced the suspension of his presidential campaign on February 3, 2016, shortly after the Iowa caucus, where he finished in fifth place.

== Political positions ==
A supporter of the Tea Party movement, Paul has described himself as a "constitutional conservative". He is generally described as a libertarian, a term he both embraced and rejected during his first Senate campaign. He supports term limits, a balanced budget amendment, and the Read the Bills Act, in addition to the widespread reduction of federal spending and taxation. He favors a flat tax rate of 14.5% for individuals and business, while eliminating the FICA payroll taxes, as well as taxes on inheritance, gifts, capital gains, dividends, and interest. Paul has frequently appeared on Infowars with radio show host and right-wing conspiracy theorist Alex Jones. Ideologically, the American Conservative Union has given Paul a lifetime conservative rating of 96% and the Conservative Review gave him a 92% score. Since the 2016 Republican primary, when Paul was highly critical of Trump, he has "become one of the president's closest allies despite occasionally voting against Trump's nominees and legislative proposals". As of June 2020, according to FiveThirtyEight, Paul had voted with President Trump's position on congressional issues 70% of the time, the second lowest among all Republican senators. Paul is a supporter of free trade, and has frequently rebuked President Trump for his tariffs. He was also one of the four Republicans who broke party line to vote for a resolution opposing tariffs on Canada.

=== Economic policy ===
Paul supports a balanced budget amendment to the U.S. constitution which would require Congress to balance the budget annually. He has introduced legislation called the Penny Plan which would reduce federal spending by 1% each year, seeking to balance the budget in 5 years. Paul has opposed efforts to raise the debt ceiling without significant spending cuts.

While running for president in 2016, Paul proposed the "Fair and Flat Tax" plan which he said would "repeal the entire IRS tax code ... and replace it with a low, broad-based tax of 14.5 [percent] on individuals and businesses".

Paul has introduced legislation to audit the Federal Reserve, saying that "We must take a critical look at the Fed's monetary policy decisions, discount window operations, and a host of other things, with a real audit—and not just pay lip-service to the idea of an audit."

Paul has a tradition of publishing a Festivus report in which he airs grievances against wasteful federal spending. The 2023 report alleged $900 billion in wasteful spending, noting $8,395 for a lobster tank for the Pentagon. In 2025, the report alleged $1.6 trillion of wasteful spending, and highlighted a Department of Veterans Affairs-funded effort "teaching teenage ferrets how to binge drink."

=== Environmental policy ===
Paul has not definitively accepted the scientific consensus that global warming is real, progressing, and primarily caused by humans. Paul has said pollution emissions are subject to "onerous regulation". In 2018, Paul called for an investigation of a National Science Foundation grant that went towards educating meteorologists about the science of climate change. Paul said the grant was "not science" but "propagandizing". In a January 2020 tweet, Paul wrote, "Despite climate alarmist predictions, humans will likely survive for hundreds of millions of years into the future. In the meantime, we should begin creating atmospheres on suitable moons or planets."

=== Foreign policy ===
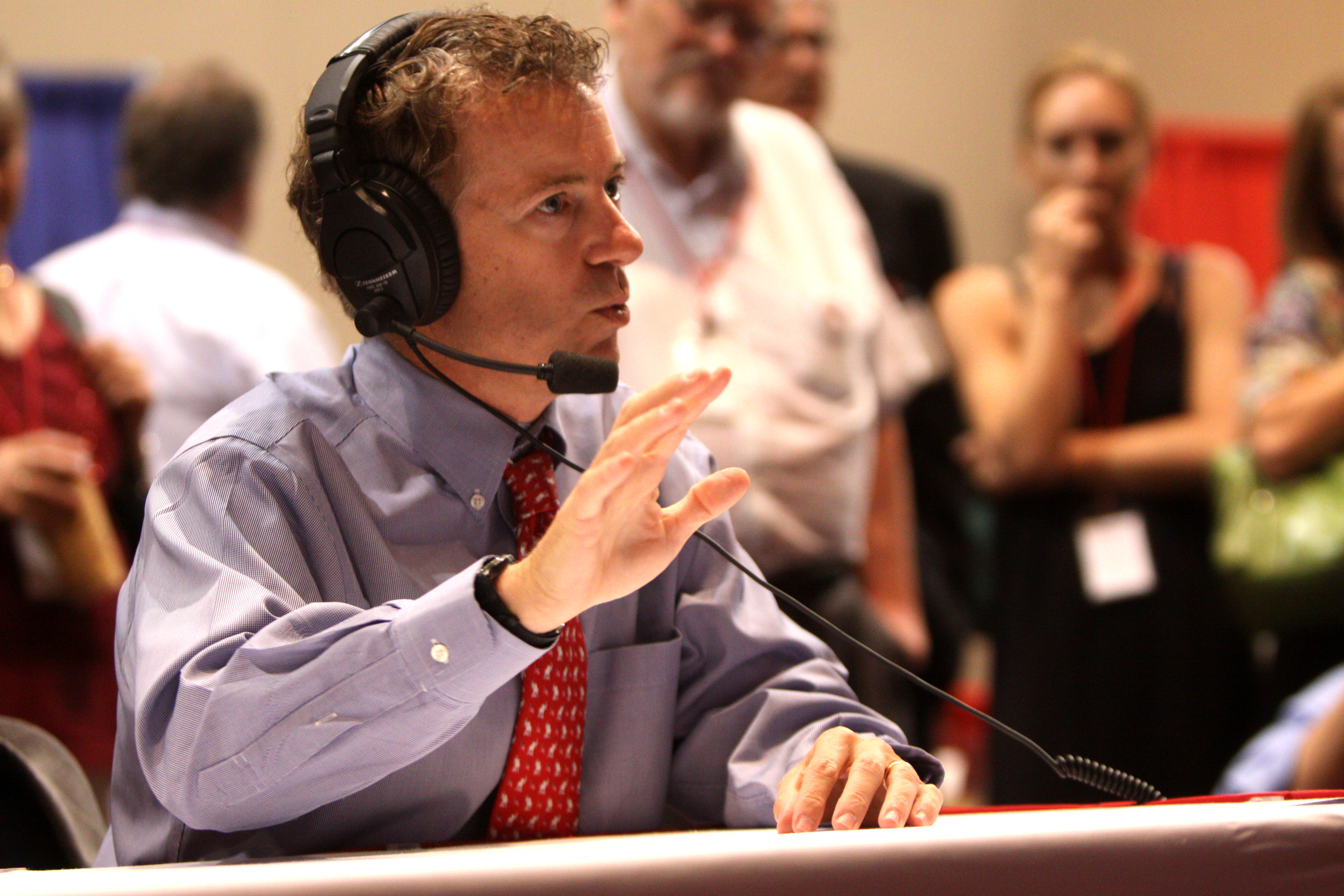
Paul being interviewed by Jerry Doyle at Liberty Political Action Conference (LPAC) 2011 in Reno, Nevada, September 16, 2011

Unlike his more stridently "non-interventionist" father, Paul concedes a role for American armed forces abroad, including permanent foreign military bases. He has said that he blames supporters of the Iraq War and not President Obama for the growth in violence that occurred in 2014, and that the Iraq War "emboldened" Iran. Dick Cheney, John McCain and Rick Perry responded by calling Paul an isolationist, but Paul has pointed to opinion polls of likely GOP primary voters as support for his position. In 2011, shortly after being elected, Paul proposed a budget which specified $542 billion in defense spending. In 2015, he called for a defense budget of $697 billion.

Referring to ISIS, Paul stated: "I personally believe that this group would not be in Iraq and would not be as powerful had we not been supplying their allies in the war [against Syrian Bashar al-Assad's government]." Paul then supported airstrikes against ISIS, but questioned the constitutionality of Obama's unilateral actions without a clear congressional mandate. Paul has stated concerns about arms sent to Syrian rebels that wind up in unfriendly hands. In December 2018 he supported President Trump's decision to pull the US army out from the Syrian Civil war.

In 2016, Paul was one of the first members of Congress to come out in opposition to United States support for the Saudi Arabian-led intervention in Yemen. In June 2017, Paul tried to block Trump administration's plan to sell more weapons to Saudi Arabia. In April 2018, he again criticized the U.S.-Saudi Arabia alliance, highlighting that "Saudi Arabia has funded radical madrassas, teaching hatred of America throughout the world, and that Saudi Arabia also supplied arms to ISIS in the Syrian civil war." Paul said that U.S.-backed Saudi blockade of Yemen has further aggravated the humanitarian crisis in the country.

Paul, like his father, has also been a critic of neoconservatism, and urged Trump not to choose prominent neoconservative Elliott Abrams to serve as Deputy Secretary of State. In April 2018, Paul voted for the confirmation of Mike Pompeo as Secretary of State. Paul had previously insisted that he would not confirm Pompeo, citing Pompeo's hawkish foreign policy beliefs.

In June 2019, Paul criticized the Trump administration for escalating tensions with Iran. Said Paul: "One of the things I like about President Trump is that he said the Iraq War was a mistake. I think an Iran war would be even a bigger mistake than the Iraq War." In January 2020 he criticized the U.S. airstrike on Baghdad International Airport which killed high-level Iranian General Qasem Soleimani. Paul stated that the attack will increase tensions between the two countries.

On June 12, 2017, U.S. senators reached an agreement on legislation imposing new sanctions on Russia and Iran. The bill was opposed only by Rand Paul and Bernie Sanders. In July 2018, shortly after 12 Russian intelligence officers have been charged with hacking and leaking emails of senior Democrats, he described the Special Counsel investigation into Russian interference in the 2016 election as a "witch hunt on the president". That same month, Paul blocked a Senate resolution that backed the intelligence community's assessment of Russian election interference and that called on President Trump to speak with special counsel Robert Mueller. In August 2018 Paul traveled to Moscow and met with several Russian senators, including Sergey Kislyak. In May 2019, Paul opposed the decision of the Senate Intelligence committee, chaired by Republican Senator Richard Burr, to subpoena Donald Trump Jr., a close friend of Paul's, to testify in front of Congress about his involvement with Russians during the 2016 presidential campaign. In July 2018, Paul was among only two senators to vote against a Senate motion supporting NATO.

On July 1, 2020, the Senate rejected Paul's amendment to the National Defense Authorization Act which would have required the withdrawal of all U.S. forces from Afghanistan within a year and brought an end to the 19-year war.

On May 12, 2022, Paul stopped a vote on a $40 billion spending bill for aid to Ukraine during the 2022 Russian invasion, objecting that it would be the second spending bill for this purpose, and that it was 3 times larger than the first. Paul has also stated that President Biden provoked Russia by advocating for Ukraine's entrance into NATO. In July, Ukraine's Center for Countering Disinformation placed Paul on a list of public figures whom it alleges promote Russian propaganda.

In January 2024, Paul voted for a resolution, proposed by Bernie Sanders, to apply the human rights provisions of the Foreign Assistance Act to the Israel military assistance. The proposal was defeated 72 to 11. In November 2024, Paul would reverse himself and vote against Sen Sanders' joint resolution providing for congressional disapproval of the proposed foreign military sale to the Government of Israel of certain defense articles and services.

After Trump announced that America "will take over the Gaza Strip," in February 2025, Paul took to Twitter (now X) to criticize the statement, saying "The pursuit for peace should be that of the Israelis and the Palestinians. I thought we voted for America First. We have no business contemplating yet another occupation to doom our treasure and spill our soldiers blood."

In June 2025, Paul criticized Trump's support for Israeli strikes against Iran and opposed the possible involvement of the United States in the war. In March 2026, Paul criticized the Trump administration's justification for military action against Iran, stating the reasons provided were not valid. Paul argued that war should be a last resort rather than a first choice, advocating for exhaustion of all other options. Paul was the sole Republican to vote for Senate Resolution 852, which would require the State Department to produce a report on Israel's human rights practices and violence in the West Bank, including the killings of American citizens.

=== Health care ===
Paul supports repealing the Affordable Care Act and opposes universal health care, having once equated it to slavery. Paul says he instead favors expanding health savings accounts and providing a $5000 tax credit, allowing health insurance to be sold across state lines, and allowing individuals and small businesses to pool together to purchase insurance. His plan would provide a two-year window during which people with pre-existing conditions could not be denied coverage.

In 2022, Paul was one of the 11 Senators who voted against the Honoring our PACT Act of 2022 (a bill that provided funding for research and benefits for up to 3.5 million veterans exposed to toxic substances during their service).

==== Abortion ====
Paul describes himself as "100% pro life", believing that legal personhood begins at fertilization. In 2009, his position was to ban abortion under all circumstances. Since 2010, he has said he would allow for a doctor's discretion in life-threatening cases such as ectopic pregnancies. In 2011, Paul signed onto the No Taxpayer Funding for Abortion Act which was intended to prohibit federal funding for abortion, with the exception of abortions in the case of rape, incest, and to save the life of the mother.

==== Disease control ====
In 2009, Paul was interviewed by conspiracy theorist Alex Jones and suggested mandatory vaccination would be akin to martial law. On February 2, 2015, he told conservative radio host Laura Ingraham regarding vaccinations, that "most of them ought be voluntary". His remarks generated controversy by suggesting that states should not require parents to vaccinate their children, because parents should have the freedom to make that decision for their children. Later that day, in an interview with CNBC, Paul clarified this statement, saying, "I'm not arguing vaccines are a bad idea. I think they are a good thing, but I think the parent should have some input. The state doesn't own your children. Parents own the children, and it is an issue of freedom." In May 2020, Paul said that stay-at-home orders during the COVID-19 pandemic amounted to "dictatorship" by Kentucky's Democratic governor Andy Beshear.

Paul has spread false claims about the safety and efficacy of the COVID-19 vaccine and other vaccines, once saying, "I've heard of many tragic cases of walking, talking, normal children who wound up with profound mental disorders after vaccines." On February 3, 2015, he posted a photograph to Twitter of himself being vaccinated.

In 2014, Paul argued that the Obama administration and the Centers for Disease Control (CDC) were downplaying the threat posed by Ebola virus in the United States. Ultimately, nine people infected with Ebola returned to the United States, two nurses contracted the disease within the US, and two of the returning travelers died.

At a Senate committee hearing on September 23, 2020, Paul clashed with Anthony Fauci, director of the National Institute of Allergy and Infectious Diseases. Paul asked Fauci if he had "second thoughts" about the CDC's mitigation recommendations, including mask-wearing and maintaining a six-foot space of social distancing. Paul said New York's high fatality rate showed that mitigation efforts were insufficient. Fauci replied, "You've misconstrued that Senator, and you've done that repetitively in the past", saying that New York had succeeded in getting the virus under control by adhering to the CDC's clinical guidelines.

In May 2021, during President Biden's push to convince more Americans to be vaccinated, Paul said he personally was choosing not to get the COVID vaccine, justifying his decision by saying that "I've already had the disease and I have natural immunity" and that "in a free country ... each individual would get to make the medical decision." Paul later challenged Health and Human Services Secretary Xavier Becerra on the Biden administration's vaccine mandates by arguing that they are not needed for people who have been previously infected.

At Senate hearings in May and July 2021, Paul debated Anthony Fauci on the origin of COVID-19, gaining media attention for his concerns about the risks of lab work. In July 2021, Fauci responded to Paul's allegations and called him a liar. In August 2021, Paul was suspended from YouTube for a week under the company's misinformation policy after he published a video with false claims that masks are not effective. Paul also released a video of himself calling on people to "resist" public health measures to halt the spread of COVID-19.

On August 11, 2021, Rand Paul disclosed that his wife Kelley Paul had purchased a stake in Gilead Sciences, which manufactures an antiviral drug used to treat COVID-19, on February 26, 2020.

On October 10, 2023, Paul published Deception: The Great Covid Cover-Up with publisher Regnery Publishing.

=== Immigration ===
On September 5, 2017, the Trump administration announced the intended rescission of the Deferred Action for Childhood Arrivals program. In tweets responding to the act, Paul stated the executive order that created DACA was illegal and congressional bipartisanship was needed to solve or fix the program.

Paul was one of 11 Republicans in 2019 to vote against Trump's demand for "emergency border funding".

=== Law enforcement ===
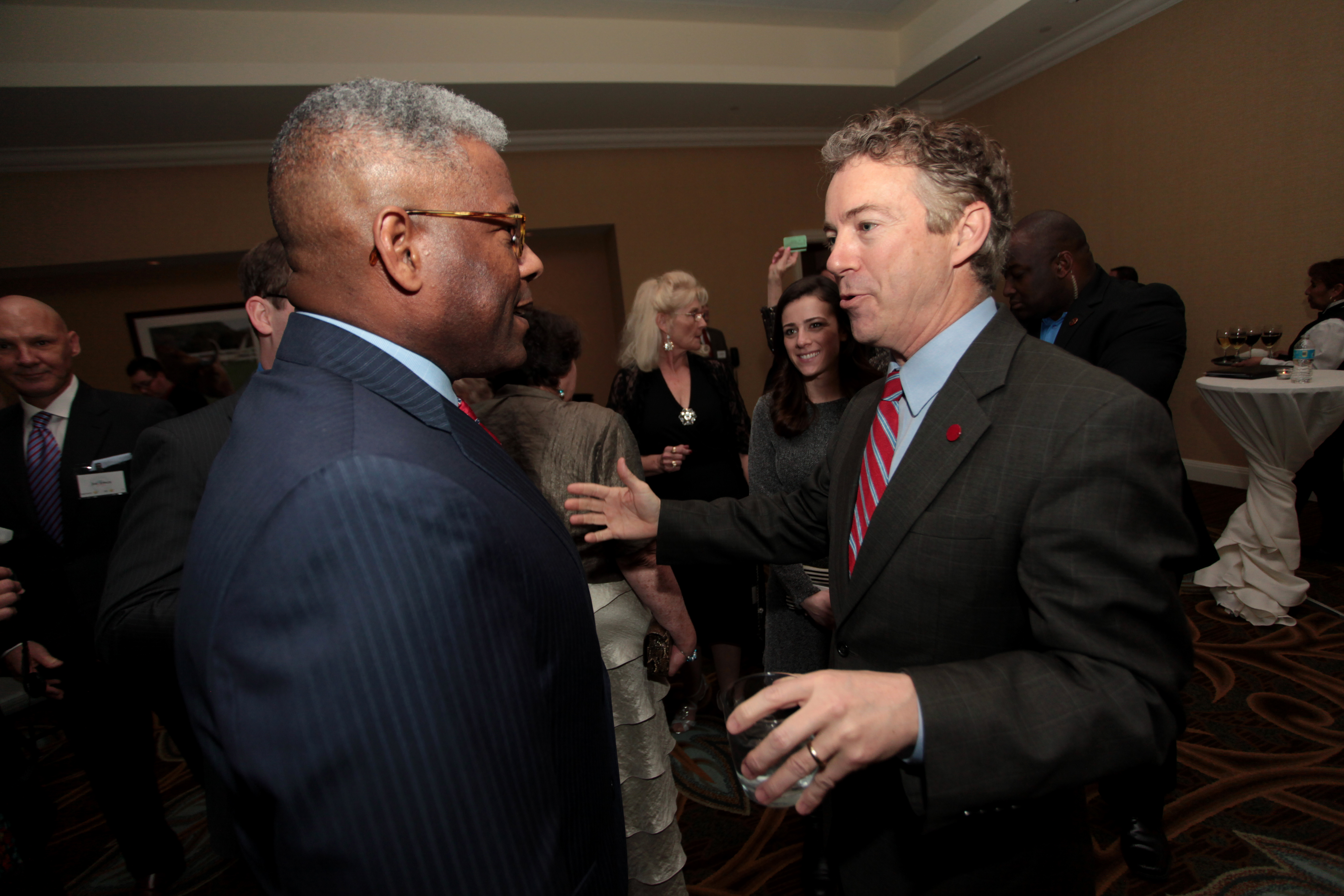
Paul speaking with former U.S. congressman Allen West

Paul has focused on criminal justice reform as a legislative priority. He introduced the Justice Safety Valve Act in 2013 to provide judges with greater sentencing flexibility, the Civil Rights Voting Restoration Act in 2014 to restore voting rights for non-violent felons, the REDEEM Act in 2014 to allow sealing and expungement for non-violent crimes, the FAIR Act in 2014 to rein in police use of civil asset forfeiture, the RESET Act in 2014 to address the crack sentencing disparity and how drugs are weighed, the Police CAMERA Act in 2015 to increase the use of body cameras by police, the Stop Militarizing Our Law Enforcement Act in 2015 to reduce the use of military equipment by police, the MERCY Act in 2015 to restrict the use of solitary confinement on juveniles, the Pretrial Integrity and Safety Act in 2017 to encourage states to reform bail policies, the Pregnant Women in Custody Act in 2018 to protect the health and safety of pregnant women in prison, and the Justice for Breonna Taylor Act in 2020 to end the use of no-knock warrants. Paul says policies such as the war on drugs and mandatory minimum sentencing have particularly harmed minorities.

In 2020, Paul held up bipartisan legislation that would make lynching a federal crime. Paul said that he thought lynching should be "universally condemned", but wanted an amendment to clarify that the causation of non-fatal injuries would not be considered lynching.

Paul was one of six Republican senators to vote no on expanding the COVID-19 Hate Crimes Act, which would allow the U.S. Justice Department to review hate crimes related to COVID-19 and establish an online database.

On May 28, 2021, Paul voted against creating an independent commission to investigate the 2021 United States Capitol attack.

Paul supported the First Step Act.

==== Drug policy ====
On cannabis legalization, Paul says the issue should be left up to the states and that "you ought to be able to pretty much do what you want to do as long as you don't hurt somebody else". Regarding medical use, Paul has endorsed efforts to legalize in Kentucky and introduced the CARERS Act in 2015 to legalize medical cannabis at the federal level. Paul has also supported states' rights-focused cannabis legislation, introducing the Rohrabacher–Farr amendment in 2014, cosponsoring the STATES Act in 2018, and introducing other amendments. Paul introduced the Marijuana Businesses Access to Banking Act in 2015 to allow cannabis businesses increased access to banks.

Regarding industrial hemp cultivation, Paul has supported efforts to legalize in Kentucky and at the federal level as well, introducing the Industrial Hemp Farming Act in 2013. In 2020 he introduced the Hemp Economic Mobilization Plan (HEMP) Act to increase the THC limit of hemp from 0.3% to 1%.

In 2022, Paul introduced the Right to Try Clarification Act to clarify that the Right to Try Act allows terminally ill patients to use Schedule I drugs for which a Phase I clinical trial has been completed. Also in 2022, he introduced the Breakthrough Therapies Act to allow Schedule I drugs such as psilocybin and MDMA to be rescheduled when they are designated as breakthrough therapies by the Food and Drug Administration.

==== Government surveillance ====
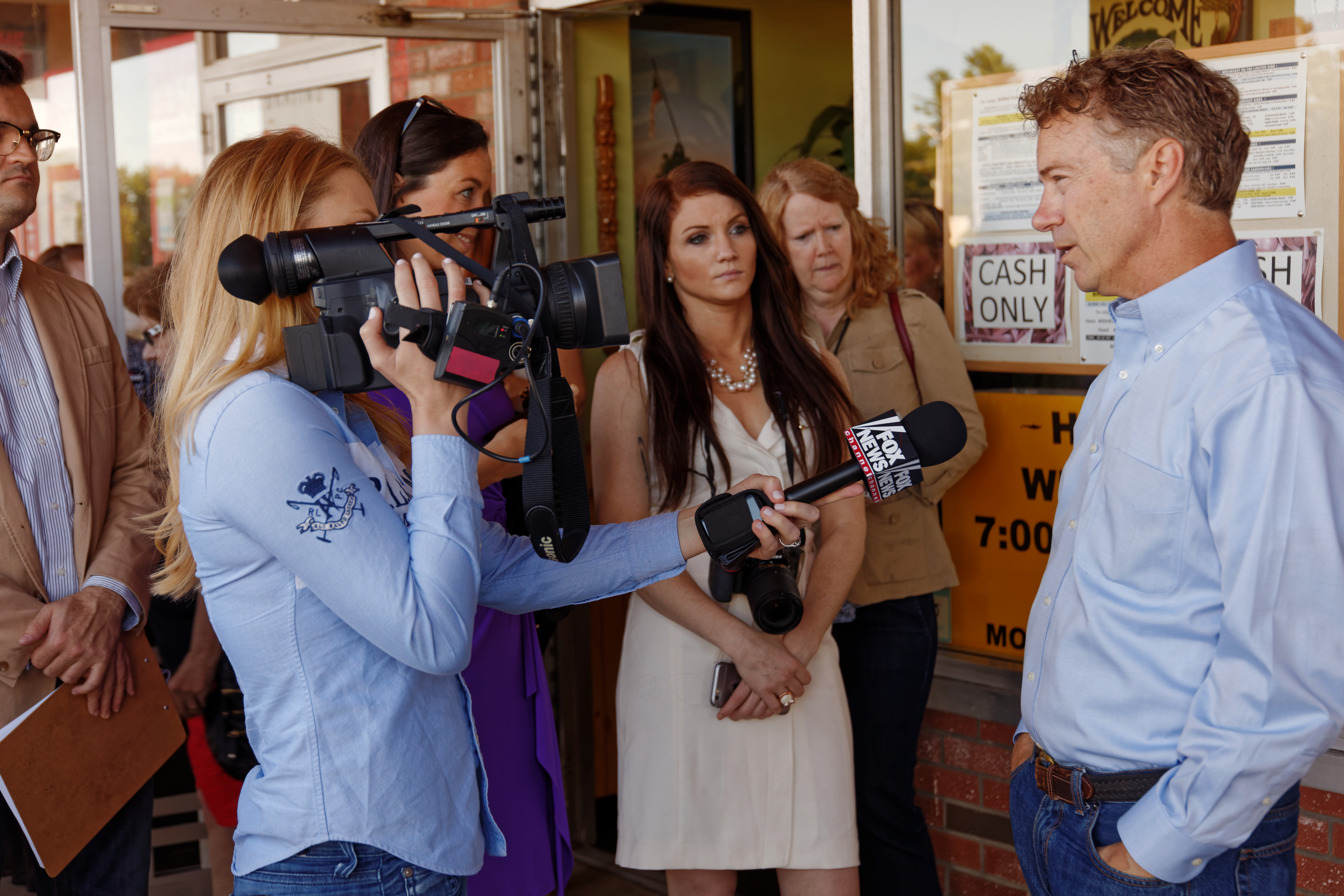
Paul in New Hampshire, August 13, 2015

As a critic of warrantless surveillance of Americans, Paul says "the Fourth Amendment is equally as important as the Second Amendment" and has called for conservatives to more strongly defend Fourth Amendment rights. In 2015 Paul spoke for ten and a half hours on the Senate floor against renewing provisions of the PATRIOT Act that he said were unconstitutional. Paul has called Edward Snowden a "whistleblower" and called for Director of National Intelligence James Clapper to resign for "lying" about the phone metadata program that Snowden exposed. He also filed a class action lawsuit against the Obama administration seeking to end the program. Paul gave a speech at the University of California, Berkeley in 2014 titled "The N.S.A. vs. Your Privacy".

=== Social policy ===
==== Animal rights ====
In 2021, Paul and Senator Cory Booker co-sponsored the FDA Modernization Act 2.0, which eliminated the requirement that pharmaceuticals in development use animal testing before commencing human trials. Paul stated that the bill would help "end the needless suffering and death of animal test subjects" and "get safer, more effective drugs to market more quickly by cutting red tape that is not supported by current science." The legislation was signed by President Joe Biden in December 2022.

Following the law's enactment, the FDA failed to promptly issue updated regulations eliminating animal testing requirements. In November 2023, Paul led a bipartisan letter to FDA commissioner Robert Califf pressing the agency to bring its regulations into alignment with the relevant statute. In January 2025, Paul and Booker introduced a new version of the law, the FDA Modernization Act 3.0, to force the FDA to revise its regulations.

==== LGBTQ rights ====
Paul has said that same-sex marriage "offends [himself] and a lot of people" on a personal level, and said there is a "crisis that allows people to think there would be some other sorts of marriage." In 2010, he supported a constitutional amendment to ban same-sex marriage nationwide. Prior to the Supreme Court's 2015 decision in Obergefell v. Hodges legalizing same-sex marriage across the United States, Paul held the view that the decision to ban same-sex marriage should be in the hands of states. Following the Court's decision, Paul said in 2015, "While I disagree with Supreme Court's redefinition of marriage, I believe that all Americans have the right to contract. The Constitution is silent on the question of marriage because marriage has always been a local issue. Our founding fathers went to the local courthouse to be married, not to Washington, D.C. I've often said I don't want my guns or my marriage registered in Washington."

During Rachel Levine's confirmation hearing with the Senate HELP Committee to be Assistant Secretary of Health and Human Services under President Joe Biden, Paul compared transgender medicine to "genital mutilation" and accused her of supporting "surgical destruction of a minor's genitalia." Paul was rebuked by committee chairman Patty Murray, as well as multiple House and Senate Democrats, who were to vote on the Equality Act that same day.

=== Term limits ===
In November 2019, Paul signed a pledge to support a constitutional amendment to limit senators to two terms. In 2022, he was elected for his third term in the U.S. Senate; in announcing his run for reelection he said: "I am a fan of term limits. It would take a constitutional amendment, and the term limits would then be for everyone. But I'm not in favor of term limits for some and not others, so I'm not in favor of people self-imposing term limits. I'm a co-sponsor of the constitutional amendment, but I will run again in 2022."

== Personal life ==
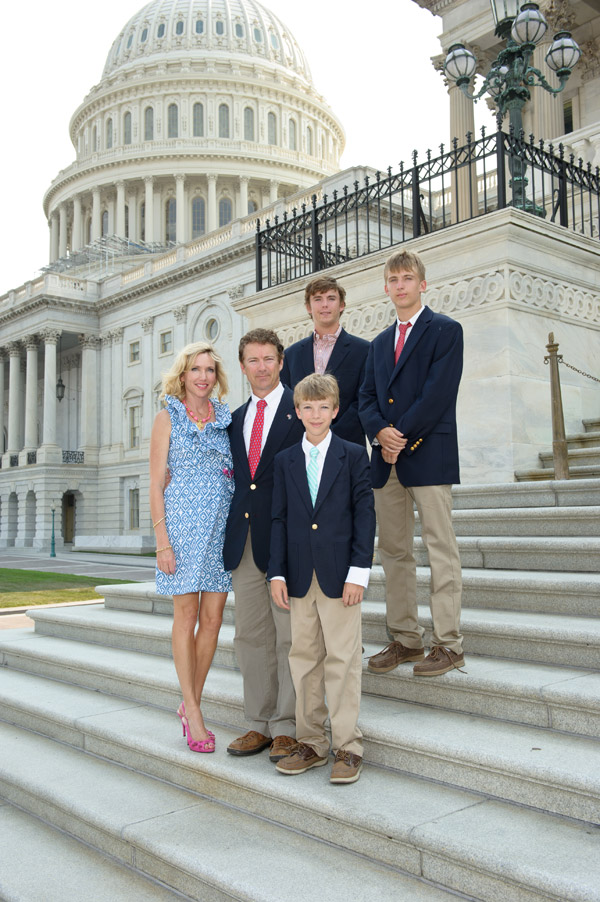
Paul with his family on the Capitol steps

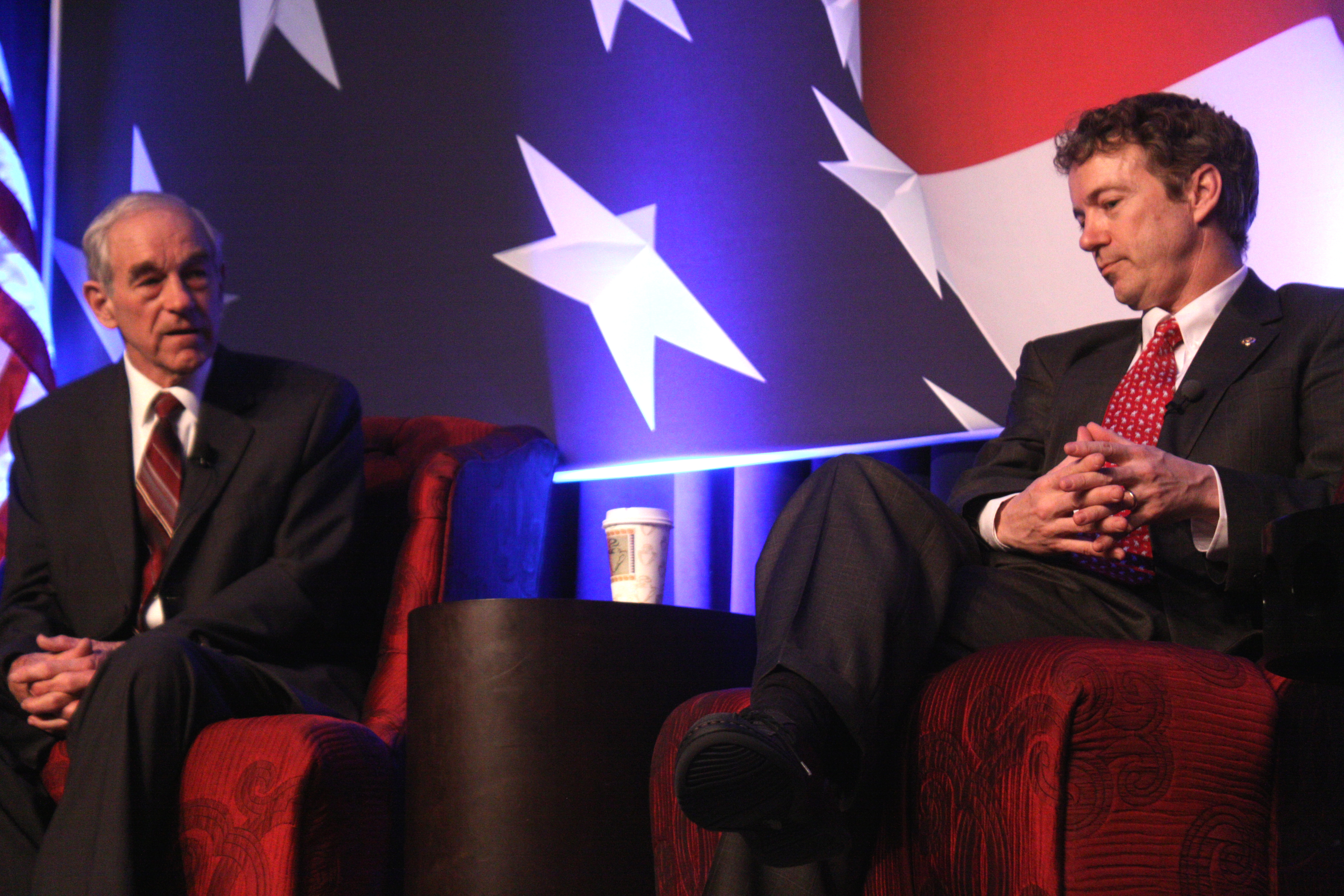
Paul and his father Ron Paul at an event hosted in their honor at CPAC 2011 in Washington, D.C.

Paul is married to Kelley Paul (née Ashby), a freelance writer. They were married on October 20, 1990, and have three sons, William (born 1992), Duncan, and Robert. William and Duncan attended the University of Kentucky, while Robert attended a private school in the Washington, D.C. area. They reside in Bowling Green, Kentucky. They were previously active members of the Presbyterian church, although more recently have attended a United Methodist church.

=== 2017 assault ===
On November 3, 2017, Paul was assaulted by a neighbor, Rene Boucher (then aged 59), a retired anesthesiologist. Paul, who is deaf in one ear, was wearing noise-canceling headphones while mowing his lawn, reportedly enabling Boucher to tackle Paul without his approach being noticed.

Boucher was arrested and charged with one count of fourth-degree assault and released on a $7,500 bond. Paul sustained five broken ribs, of which three were displaced fractures. In August 2019, part of Paul's lung required removal as a result of the injuries he suffered during the attack.

Boucher's attorney, Matthew Baker, described it as "a very regrettable dispute between two neighbors over a matter that most people would regard as trivial". According to a memorandum filed by Baker the dispute was over Paul repeatedly leaving tree yard debris near his property line with his neighbor. Rand Paul and his wife deny this; they said that the media "misrepresented this from the beginning" and that the attack was "politically motivated". They said that Boucher had threatened Donald Trump earlier and that he was "a vocal hater" of Trump and the GOP.

Boucher was originally charged in Kentucky state court, but was later charged in federal court, where he ultimately pleaded guilty to assaulting a member of Congress. The state-court charge was dismissed after Boucher pleaded guilty to the federal charge. Boucher was initially sentenced to 30 days in prison, one year of probation, 100 hours of community service, and a $10,000 fine. The federal prosecutors had sought a 21-month term and appealed the lenient sentence.

In September 2019, the United States Court of Appeals for the Sixth Circuit vacated Boucher's sentence of 30 days, ruling it was unreasonably short, indicating "closer review" was in order, and the case was sent back to the lower court for resentencing. An appeal to the Supreme Court was denied. At his resentencing, Boucher received a prison term of eight months, plus another six months of home confinement, and was given credit for the 30 days he had previously served. Prosecutors felt the downward departure from their request for a 21-month sentence was too great, but the judge said Boucher's eight years in the military, being forced to sell his home to pay a $580,000 judgment assessed by the state court against him in the civil case brought by Paul, and his completed community service militated against any additional prison time. Boucher expressed his regrets and contrition for his attack.

=== 2020 COVID-19 diagnosis ===
Paul announced on March 22, 2020, that he had tested positive for COVID-19 amid the ongoing pandemic of the disease. He was the first member of the United States Senate to test positive. Paul received bipartisan criticism from his Senate colleagues after it was discovered that he attended Senate lunches and used the Senate gym while awaiting his test results; he defended his actions because he had no symptoms of the illness and believed it was "highly unlikely" he was sick. On April 7, 2020, Paul announced his recovery.

=== 2020 RNC confrontation ===
In August 2020, immediately following his attendance at the keynote speech delivered by President Donald Trump for the 2020 Republican National Convention held at the White House, Paul was confronted by protestors on his way to a hotel with his wife. A police perimeter was formed that escorted the Pauls away from the crowd, with one of the escorting officers being pushed in the process. The protestors' main contention point with Paul was the killing of Breonna Taylor and their demands for Paul to "say her name". However, as was pointed out by several media organizations in the aftermath of the incident, Paul had previously authored a bill named after Taylor aiming to make no-knock warrants illegal.

== Works ==
- Paul, Rand (2011). The Tea Party Goes to Washington. Center Street. ISBN 978-1-4555-0286-8.
- Paul, Rand (2012). Government Bullies: How Everyday Americans Are Being Harassed, Abused, and Imprisoned by the Feds. Center Street. ISBN 978-1-4555-2276-7.
- Paul, Rand; Robison, James Randall (2015). Our Presidents & Their Prayers: Proclamations of Faith by America's Leaders. Center Street. ISBN 978-1-4555-3575-0.
- Paul, Rand (2015). Taking a Stand: Moving Beyond Partisan Politics to Unite America. Center Street. ISBN 978-1-4555-4955-9.
- Paul, Rand (2019). The Case Against Socialism. Broadside Books. ISBN 978-0-06-295486-2.
- Paul, Rand (2023). Deception: The Great Covid Cover-Up. Regnery. ISBN 978-1-68451-514-1.

== See also ==
- Electoral history of Rand Paul
- List of politicians affiliated with the Tea Party movement
- List of members of the United States Congress killed or wounded in office
- Physicians in the United States Congress
- 2016 Republican Party presidential candidates

Party political offices
Preceded by Jim Bunning	Republican nominee for U.S. Senator from Kentucky (Class 3); 2010, 2016, 2022	Most recent
U.S. Senate
Preceded by Jim Bunning	U.S. Senator (Class 3) from Kentucky; 2011–present Served alongside: Mitch McConnell, Andy Barr (elect)	Incumbent
Preceded by Ben Cardin	Ranking Member of the Senate Small Business Committee; 2021–2023	Succeeded by Joni Ernst
Preceded by Rob Portman	Ranking Member of the Senate Homeland Security Committee; 2023–2025	Succeeded by Gary Peters
Preceded by Gary Peters	Chair of the Senate Homeland Security Committee; 2025–present	Incumbent
U.S. order of precedence (ceremonial)
Preceded by Richard Blumenthal	Order of precedence of the United States as United States Senator	Succeeded by John Boozman
Preceded by Ron Johnson	United States senators by seniority 30th	Succeeded by Richard Blumenthal
