= Government Bullies =

2012 book by Rand Paul

- The cover of Government Bullies, published by U.S. Senator Rand Paul in 2012
- Author: Rand Paul
- Language: English
- Subject: Politics
- Published: September 11, 2012
- Pages: 280 pp
- ISBN: 978-1-4555-2275-0
- OCLC: 788291823

Government Bullies: How Everyday Americans are Being Harassed, Abused, and Imprisoned by the Feds is a book by U.S. Senator Rand Paul of Kentucky. The book contains anecdotes of difficulties people have had dealing with agencies of the U.S. federal government.

The book was released in 2012, and is published by Center Street, a main publishing division of Hachette Book Group. The foreword to the book was written by Paul's father, Ron Paul.

== Reception ==
In his review of Government Bullies for The Washington Times, William Murchison wrote that Paul "never really ties things together with any artistry" and that the book is "more political barrage than academic rendering."

== Plagiarism ==
Journalists discovered that Government Bullies contained passages that were copied from articles from The Heritage Foundation and the Cato Institute. Further investigation revealed another four instances of plagiarism from articles by Jonathan H. Adler, Pacific Legal Foundation attorney Timothy Sandefur, and an article from Forbes. While citations were listed in the footnotes, the material was presented without quotes or indentation. Book publisher Center Street indicated that future printings would include attributions.
