= Athanasios Moulakis =

Greek political scientist and academic

Athanasios Moulakis (Greek: Αθανάσιος Μουλάκης; July 11, 1945 – July 18, 2015) was President Emeritus of the American University of Iraq - Sulaimani (AUI-S) and a former Acting President and Chief Academic Officer, Professor of Government at the American University of Afghanistan.

== Life ==
Born in Athens, Greece in 1945, he taught political theory and the history of political thought at German universities, the London School of Economics and the European University Institute of Florence where he was Head of the department of political and social sciences. After engagements at UCSD, Harvard, and St. John's College he was named Herbst Professor of Humanities at the University of Colorado, Boulder. He was professor of public communication at the University of Italian Switzerland in Lugano before moving on to the American University of Afghanistan. His "Beyond Utility Liberal Education for a Technological Age" received the AAC&U's prize for best book on liberal education in 1995. Moulakis died in July 2015.

== Academic career ==
Moulakis joined the American University of Afghanistan at the beginning of 2008. Previously, he was director of the Institute for Mediterranean Studies of the University of Lugano. Over an 11-year period Moulakis was Herbst Professor of Humanities and Professor of Political Science at the University of Colorado, where he was also founding Director of the Herbst Program of Humanities.

Moulakis has held other academic and administrative assignments at European and North American colleges, institutes, and universities. A partial list includes the European University Institute in Florence, where he served as head of the Department of Political and Social Sciences; a Fulbright professorship at the University of Jena, Germany; the London School of Economics; St. John's College, Annapolis; Harvard University; and the University of California, San Diego.

His publication list includes a large number of books and articles on topics in the humanities, political theory, public policy, higher education, international relations, and other scholarly fields. With a Dr.Phil. (magna cum laude) degree from the Ruhr-Universität Bochum, Moulakis has published and lectured in five languages. He has received numerous academic honors and awards, including the American Association of Colleges and Universities’ prize for best book on liberal education.

== Published works ==
- Simone Weil and the Politics of Self-Denial, Athanasios Moulakis, Translated from German by Ruth Hein, Publisher: University of Missouri Press Pub. Date: February 1998 ISBN 978-0-8262-1162-0
- History of Political Ideas: Hellenism, Rome, and Early Christianity, Vol. 1 by Athanasios Moulakis (Editor), Eric Voegelin, Athanasios Moulakis Publisher: University of Missouri Press Pub. Date: June 1997 ISBN 978-0-8262-1126-2
- Promise of History: Essays in Political Philosophy by Athanasios Moulakis (Editor) Publisher: Walter de Gruyter, Inc. Pub. Date: December 1985 ISBN 978-3-11-010043-3
- Republican Realism in Renaissance Florence: Francesco Guicciardini's "Discorso di Logrogno" by Athanasios Moulakis, Francesco Guicciardini Publisher: Rowman & Littlefield Publishers, Inc. Pub. Date: May 1998 ISBN 978-0-8476-8993-4
- Beyond Utility: Liberal Education for a Technological Age by Athanasios Moulakis Publisher: University of Missouri Press Pub. Date: December 1993 ISBN 978-0-8262-0929-0
- Legitimacy/Legitimate: Proceedings of the Conference Held in Florence, June 3–4, 1982 (Publications of the European Univ Inst, Series C: Political) by Editor-Athanasios Moulakis Publisher: Walter de Gruyter Inc Date Published: 1986-07 ISBN 978-0-89925-106-6
- Homonoia: Eintracht und Entwicklung eines politischen Bewusstseins Publisher: List Verlag, Pub.Date: Muenchen 1973 ISBN 978-3-471-87135-5

== See also ==
- Eric Voegelin
- Ellis Sandoz
- Eugene Webb
- American philosophy
- List of American philosophers
