= Oughourlian =

Oughourlian is a surname. Notable people with the surname include:

- Jean-Michel Oughourlian (born 1940), French neuropsychiatrist and psychologist
- Joseph Oughourlian (born 1972), French businessman
