= American University of Iraq, Sulaimani =

Academic institute in the Iraqi-Kurdistan region

Coordinates: 35.569778°N 45.352163°E

The American University of Iraq, Sulaimani
- Other name: AUIS
- Motto: Learn Today, Lead Tomorrow
- Type: Private
- Established: 2007
- Chairman: Jill Derby,
- Faculty: 75
- Administrative staff: 201
- Students: 1391
- Location: Sulaymaniyah, Sulaymaniyah Governorate, Iraq
- Campus: Urban, 400 acres (160 ha)
- Colors: PMS295; PMS117
- Mascot: Eagle
- Website: auis.edu.krd

American University of Iraq, Sulaimani (AUIS) (Kurdish: زانکۆی ئەمریکی لە عێراق، سلێمانی; Arabic: الجامعة الأمريكية في العراق، السليمانية) is a not-for-profit, private institution located in Sulaymaniyah, in the Kurdistan Region of Iraq. The university offers an American-style liberal arts education.

== History ==
American University of Iraq, Sulaimani was founded in 2006 by a board of trustees. The university, modeled after the famous private universities in Cairo and Beirut, was created amid the turmoil of war but in the relatively secure Kurdish region of Iraq. The purpose of founding such a university, according to Dr. Barham Salih was to stimulate reform in the Iraqi education system.

Intellectuals such as Kanan Makiya, Fouad Ajami, and John Agresto, supported the establishment of AUIS. Joshua Mitchell, professor of political theory at Georgetown University became Acting Chancellor in 2008 and remained in his position for two years while on leave from Georgetown. From 2010 to 2013, Athanasios Moulakis served as Acting President and held the title of President Emeritus of the university. In May 2013, the Board of Trustees chose Dawn Dekle as president. She became the first female president of an Iraqi university when she took up her position at AUIS. Esther Mulnix was chosen to serve as interim president after Dekle's departure. Bruce Walker Ferguson was named President of AUIS on August 1, 2016.

== Campus ==
The main campus has 169-hectares of land situated on the Sulaimani-Kirkuk Road, opposite the University of Sulaymaniyah. Construction of the campus was completed at the start of the academic year in 2011. The campus has several buildings, including an administrative building with a multipurpose conference hall, an academic building, state-of-the-art science labs, a gym, male and female dormitories, as well as two basketball courts and one soccer field. The AUIS library is located in the academic building while its cafeteria is housed in the administrative building. AUIS is currently located just outside the city limits of Sulaymaniyah. The AUIS academic building opened in October 2011 while its administrative building opened in the spring semester of 2012. Moreover, the new student dorm facilities opened in November 2012.

== Former campus ==
AUIS was first located in a temporary campus in the heart of Sulaymaniyah. The campus consisted of about 50 temporary classrooms and offices built near a main administrative building, which housed the university's cafeteria, library, and several large classrooms.

== Organization ==
The university has a board of trustees composed of prominent Iraqi and American leaders from across a wide range of sectors, including government, business, nonprofit and education sectors. The Board of Trustees oversees the management and operations of the university and is a self-perpetuating body that establishes it policies.

== Academia ==
=== Academic Preparatory Program ===
The Academic Preparatory Program (APP) prepares non-native English speaking high school graduates to enter the AUIS undergraduate program by teaching them academic English, critical thinking skills, and study habits.

All applicants to American University of Iraq, Sulaimani (AUIS) must take an English placement test upon admission. Scores on these exams, based on the English requirements, determine placement. About 90 percent of students will require English training before joining the academic program; they receive this training in APP. The program strengthens students' English language skills and provides them with the student success training and intellectual tools needed not only to do well but to thrive in the academic program.

AUIS is accredited by the Commission on English Language Program Accreditation for the period April 2020 through April 2030 and agrees to uphold the CEA Standards for English Language Programs and Institutions. CEA is recognized by the U.S. Secretary of Education as a nationally recognized accrediting agency for English language programs and institutions in the U.S.

=== Undergraduate program ===
The Undergraduate program at AUIS is modeled after the liberal American-style of education. AUIS undergraduates explore different disciplines before choosing a major.

The academic departments at AUIS are the primary vehicle for fulfilling the university's mission. AUIS offers one preparatory program, 22 undergraduate programs including two dual degrees, and one master's degree, organized into two colleges and eight departments.

College of Dentistry

- Bachelor of Dental Surgery

College of Pharmacy

- Bachelor of Pharmacy

Department of Business Administration

- Bachelor of Science, Business Administration
- Bachelor of Science, Human Resource Management
- Bachelor of Science, Digital Marketing and Social Media new
- Master of Business Administration (MBA)

Department of Engineering

- Bachelor of Science, Civil Engineering
- Bachelor of Science, Mechanical Engineering
- Bachelor of Science, Energy Engineering
- Bachelor of Science, Industrial Engineering new
- Bachelor of Science, Artificial Intelligence and Robotics Engineering new
- Dual degree Bachelor of Science, Civil Engineering, with University of Arizona
- Dual degree Bachelor of Science, Mechanical Engineering, with University of Arizona

Department of English

- Bachelor of Arts, English Journalism
- Bachelor of Arts, English Literature
- Bachelor of Arts, Translation

Department of Information Technology

- Bachelor of Science, Information Technology
- Bachelor of Science, Cybersecurity new
- Bachelor of Science, Software Engineering

Department of International Studies

- Bachelor of Arts, International Studies
- Bachelor of Arts, International Relations
- Bachelor of Arts, Law

Department of Medical & Health Sciences

- Bachelor of Science, Medical Laboratory Science

Mathematics and Natural Sciences

- Minor Geoscience
- Minor in Mathematics

=== Graduate programs ===
AUIS offers an Executive MBA program through its Business and Administration Department.

== Professional Development Institute ==
The Professional Development Institute (PDI) at AUIS complements the educational objectives of the university by providing opportunities for lifelong learning. PDI is a certified Cisco Academy and is accredited by the Association of Chartered Certified Account, the Project Management Institute, and ICDL. PDI has also been certified as a PMI Registered Education Provider.

== Student life and culture ==
Students can take part in many activities including drama, debate, linguistics, music, athletics, social work and indoor games like chess. There are several clubs and societies as well as sports and athletic teams for both men and women at AUIS. The university frequently takes part in arranging cultural events outside the campus as well. In 2013, the Drama Club and English Department joined forces to hold The Art of Social Justice - a one-week festival celebrating creative arts. The festival, backed by the US State Department, hosted performances, workshops, discussions and field trips by American and Iraqi artists. Later, AUIS senior lecturer Marie Labrosse published a book, SoJust, that chronicled the arts festival in Sulaimani.

The university has also held events and performances at important cultural landmarks like the Cultural Cafe and Chai Xana Sha’ab, in keeping with the strong traditions of the Sulaymaniyah, which is the cultural capital of Kurdistan. It has also held various poetry recitations, like the Poetry Slam, and a poetry workshop at Koç University in Istanbul.

=== Clubs and societies ===
The AUIS drama club produces plays and dramas throughout the year. Some of their productions include Twelve Angry (Wo)men, Noor,Will’s Cafe - a play to celebrate Shakespeare's 450th birthday; and The Arranged - a commentary on the tradition of arranged marriages also written by a student Mahdi Murad, and 9 Parts of Desire - performed during the Art of Social Justice Festival focusing on Iraqi migrant women. In December 2015, two AUIS students, Leah Farooq and Beyan Tahir, were selected to participate in the Home Grown program - an intensive theatrical training provided jointly by the Kevin Spacey Foundation and The Middle East Theatre Academy. The students were part of a troupe of 35 talented young people scouted from all over the Middle East for the workshop. Both participants selected from Iraq were students at AUIS. The workshop culminated in a theatrical performance in Sharjah on January 25, 2015. AUIS also hosts the offices of the first independent, English language, student newspaper in Iraq, The AUIS Voice. The AUIS Voice is run by an editorial board composed solely of students. The Washington Post included two pictures of the AUIS Voice staff in a photo collection titled “Youths in Iraq: The War Generation.” The outlet is also a member of the Associated Collegiate Press. The editorial board selects new editors in the beginning of the fall semester, and the paper is regularly published throughout the fall and spring semester.

=== Athletics ===
Student at AUIS, both men and women, are active in sports. The university has two basketball courts and one football field on campus. The official mascot for the athletics teams is the Eagle, and the teams include men's and women's basketball and football. The teams play intercollegiate as well as intramural matches at AUIS, and have also been on international tours. Students on both the women's and men's basketball team at AUIS participated in the 34th Annual Sports Fest at Boğaziçi University in 2014. In 2011, a documentary made by an American film company gained international recognition for the women's basketball team. The film, Salaam Dunk, was shown at several international film festivals including the Chicago International Film Festival and Los Angeles Film Festival.

== Institute of Regional and International Studies ==
AUIS houses Sulaymaniyah's independent research center, the Institute of Regional and International Studies (IRIS). The center focuses on local, regional, and international social and political issues through research, scholarships, debate and conferences. According to the university website, the Institute “examines the region’s most complex issues through rigorous scholarship, advanced research, and open dialogue among academic and influential public leaders.” The center conducts meetings, round-tables, conferences and lectures on topics pertinent to local and regional politics. It invites figures from the government, political parties, businesses, and historical and cultural institutions for dialogues on issues and challenges pertinent to the region. IRIS provides a space for dialogue on these topics. The center runs a conference, the Sulaimani Forum.

=== Sulaimani Forum ===
The Sulaimani Forum is an annual forum to open dialogue and debate on the challenging regional political issues concerning the Middle East. The Forum is held in March every year and focuses on the most pressing local and regional issues through in-depth panel discussions and debates. The Forum invites prominent speakers and specialists on topics from both within Iraq, the wider region, and Europe and the United States. The Forum is covered extensively by the local and international media. During the inaugural Forum in 2013, the event trended on Twitter with #SulaimaniForum in Egypt and Iraq. The event explored the changing dynamics of the Middle East and created a very open debate on issues such as Iraq's internal and external relations, oil, security, Kurdistan and the Arab Spring, etc. The speakers and panelists included distinguished names such as Hoshyar Zebari, Zalmay Khalilzad, and Max Rodenbeck among others. “For an Iraqi Kurd and someone who has attended many such events around the world, the Sulaimani Forum provided the most relevant discussions on Iraq, its politics and future,” reviewed Kurdish journalist and commentator Hiwa Osman on his blog. The second Sulaimani Forum, “Navigating Challenges in the Middle East” brought together experts from around the region on 4–5 March 2014. The list of speakers included Nechirvan Barzani, Prime Minister of the KRG, who gave a speech at the forum. Others included Hoshyar Zebari, Ahmet Davutoğlu, Zalmay Khalilzad, Falah Al Fayad and Bernard Kouchner. This Forum was also covered extensively by several media and publications. “While its unofficial epithet, The Davos of the Middle East, may be ambitious, the 2014 Sulaimani Forum, hosted by the American University of Iraq, Sulaimani (AUIS) on March 4th and 5th, was not far off the mark—especially considering that this year’s annual Forum was only the second of its kind,” reviewed the Invest In Group, covering the highlights of the Forum.

== See also ==
- Private Universities in Iraq
- Salaam Dunk, 2011 documentary about the university's women basketball program
- AUC Press
- Cairo International Model United Nations
- American University of Baghdad (AUIB)
- American University of Sharjah (AUS)
- American University of Beirut (AUB)
- American University in Dubai (AUD)
