= Immanentize the eschaton =

Pejorative term for attempts to bring about utopian conditions

In political theory and Christian theology, the phrase "immanentize the eschaton" is a generally pejorative phrase referring to attempts to bring about utopian conditions in the world, and to effectively create heaven on earth. Theologically, the belief is akin to postmillennialism as reflected in the Social Gospel of the 1880–1930 era, as well as Protestant reform movements during the Second Great Awakening in the 1830s and 1840s such as abolitionism.

== Origin ==
Usage of the phrase started with Eric Voegelin in The New Science of Politics in 1952. Conservative spokesman William F. Buckley popularized Voegelin's phrase as "Don't immanentize the eschaton!". Buckley's version became a political slogan of Young Americans for Freedom during the 1960s and 1970s.

One of the more frequently quoted passages from Voegelin's work on Gnosticism is that "The problem of an eidos in history, hence, arises only when a Christian transcendental fulfillment becomes immanentized. Such an immanentist hypostasis of the eschaton, however, is a theoretical fallacy."

== Theology ==
At the end of the 12th century, Joachim of Fiore theorized the coming of an age of earthly bliss right before the end of time. Although not a full immanentization, Joachim opened the way to an anticipation of the eschaton in the course of time. His ideas have influenced the thoughts on an immanentized eschaton.

In contemporary terminology, this process is sometimes described as "hastening the eschaton" or "hastening the apocalypse". In this sense it refers to a phenomenon related to millenarianism and the specific Christian form of millennialism which is based on a particular reading of the Christian Bible's Book of Revelation especially popular among evangelicals in the United States.

== See also ==
- Accelerationism
- Apocalypticism
- Cautionary tale
- Dominion theology
- End of history
- Inner-worldly asceticism – Max Weber's thesis on self-denial
- Liberation theology
- List of dates predicted for apocalyptic events
- List of political slogans
- Postmillennialism
- Potentiality and actuality
- Premillennialism
- Rapture
- Social Gospel
- Socialism: Utopian and Scientific
- Tikkun olam
