= Mark C. Henrie =

American journal editor

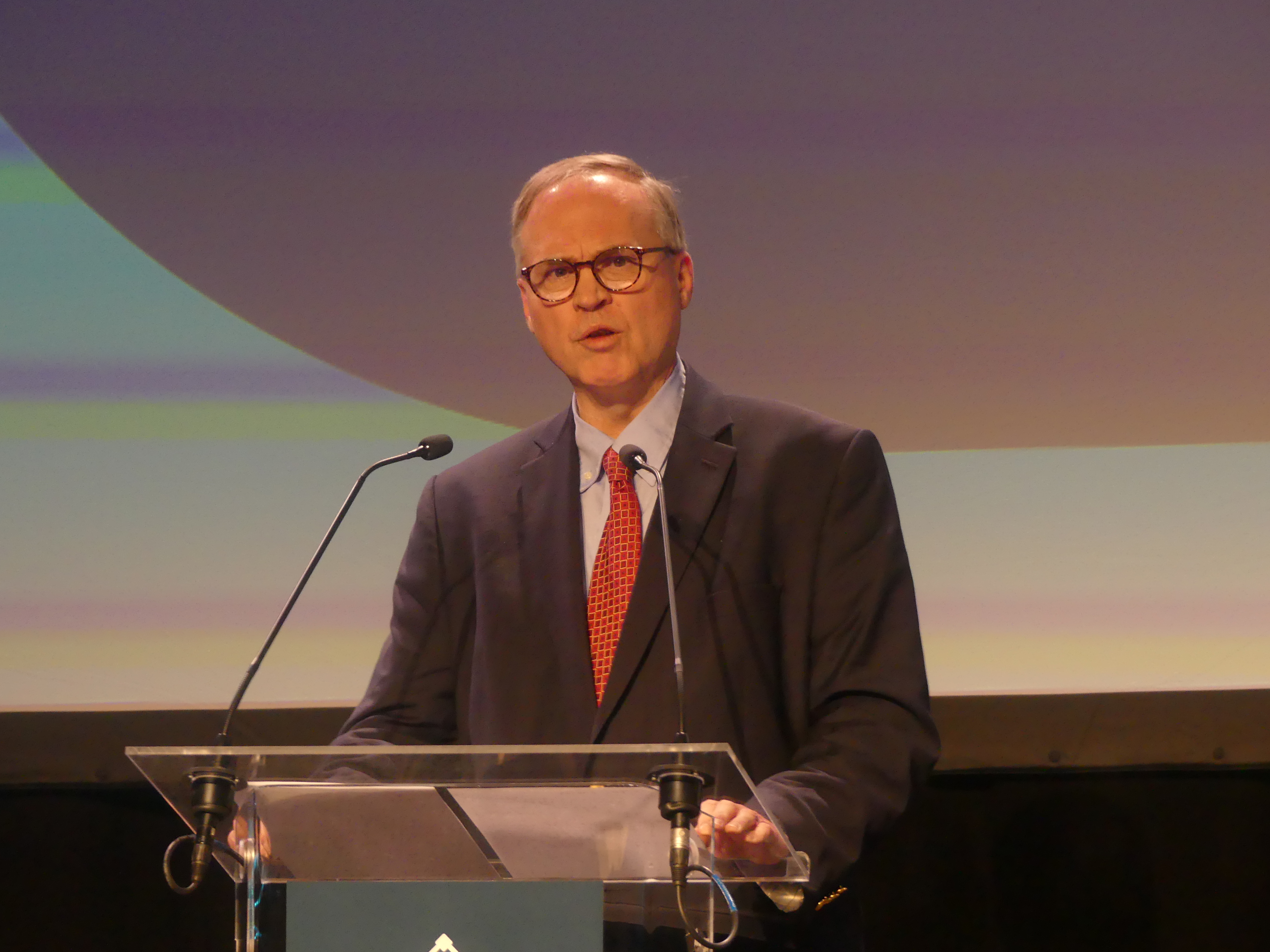
Mark C. Henrie in 2024

Mark C. Henrie is President of the Arthur N. Rupe Foundation. He is the former Chief Academic Officer and former Senior Vice-President of the Intercollegiate Studies Institute. He was the editor of the Intercollegiate Review and senior editor of Modern Age.

== Biography ==
He was educated at Dartmouth College, Harvard University, and the University of Cambridge.

He serves as a Visitor of Ralston College and a trustee of the Center for European Renewal. He is also a member of the Philadelphia Society, of the Advisory Council of First Things, and of the Board of Advisors of American Affairs.

He is perhaps best known for his book A Student's Guide to the Core Curriculum. He has, in addition, edited Doomed Bourgeois in Love (essays about the films of Whit Stillman) and Arguing Conservatism, a collection of essays that appeared first in the Intercollegiate Review. The latter volume contains contributions by Robert Bork, Cleanth Brooks, Elizabeth Fox-Genovese, Russell Kirk, Ludwig von Mises, Leo Strauss, Eric Voegelin, and Robert Penn Warren.

== Bibliography ==
- A Student's Guide to the Core Curriculum
- Arguing Conservatism (ed.)
- A Student's Guide to Liberal Learning
- Doomed Bourgeois In Love (ed.)
- The Enduring Edmund Burke (co-author)
