= Intercollegiate Studies Institute =

American conservative organization

Coordinates: 39°46′53.7″N 75°37′31.6″W

- Abbreviation: ISI
- Formation: 22 June 1953 (73 years ago)
- Founders: Frank Chodorov; William F. Buckley Jr.
- Type: nonprofit
- Tax ID no.: 23-6050131
- Legal status: 501(c)(3)
- Headquarters: 3901 Centerville Rd; Wilmington, Delaware 19807-1938, U.S.
- President: John A. Burtka IV (Note: Burtka became president on 21 September 2020)
- Chairman: Mark C. Henrie
- Revenue: $8.7 million (2025)
- Expenses: $9.5 million (2025)
- Staff: 32 (2024)
- Website: isi.org

The Intercollegiate Studies Institute (ISI) is a nonprofit educational organization that promotes conservative thought on college campuses. It was founded in 1953 by Frank Chodorov with William F. Buckley Jr. as its first president. It sponsors lectures and debates on college campuses, publishes books and journals, provides funding and editorial assistance to the Collegiate Network, a support program conservative and libertarian college newspapers, and finances graduate fellowships.

Some financial information about the organization is published on their website (for FYE 30 June 2021); however, their financials shown on their website differ somewhat from their filed IRS Form-990. For their fiscal year ending 30 June 2021, (Note: IRS Form-990 yr2020) their donations were $5,809,831, their revenue was $7,078,238, and their expenses were $6,195,894.

== History ==
In 1953, Frank Chodorov founded ISI as the Intercollegiate Society of Individualists, with a young Yale University graduate William F. Buckley Jr. as president. E. Victor Milione, ISI's next and longest-serving president, established publications, a membership network, a lecture and conference program, and a graduate fellowship program. ISI has been teaching various forms of intellectual conservatism on college campuses ever since. In the 1980s, ISI and its journal Continuity, edited by Paul Gottfried, were known to feature some neo-Confederate views.

Past ISI president and former Reagan administration official T. Kenneth Cribb led the institute from 1989 until 2011, when Christopher G. Long took over. Cribb is credited with expanding ISI's revenue from one million dollars that year to $13,636,005 in 2005. John A. Burtka IV became president of ISI in September 2020. ISI lists its core beliefs as limited government, individual liberty, personal responsibility, the rule of law, free-market economics, and traditional Judeo-Christian values. ISI is a member of the advisory board of Project 2025, a collection of conservative and right-wing policy proposals from the Heritage Foundation to reshape the United States federal government and consolidate executive power should the Republican nominee win the 2024 presidential election.

== Programs and activities ==
ISI runs a number of programs on college campuses, including student societies and student papers. It publishes a series of "Student's Guide to..." books, such as A Student's Guide to Liberal Learning. It hosts conferences and other events featuring conservative speakers and academics, and provides funding for students to attend. In this funding capacity ISI is affiliated with the Liberty Fund. ISI administers the Collegiate Network, which provides editorial and financial outreach to conservative and libertarian student journalists.

== Publications ==
Periodicals issued by ISI include:

- The Intercollegiate Review (ISSN 0020-5249)
- The Academic Reviewer (ISSN 0567-6487)
- The Political Science Reviewer (ISSN 0091-3715)

In the fall of 2006, ISI published the findings of its survey of the teaching of America's history and institutions in higher education. The Institute reported, as the title suggests, that there is a "coming crisis in citizenship."

=== ISI Books ===
Until 2023, the Intercollegiate Studies Institute operated ISI Books, which published books on conservative issues and distributed a number of books from other publishers. Its focus was largely on the humanities, the foundations of Western culture, American history, and conservative political themes. In 2023, ISI Books was acquired by Regnery Publishing.

In the summer of 2005, ISI Books published It Takes a Family: Conservatism and the Common Good by Pennsylvania Republican Senator Rick Santorum. The book premiered at No. 13 on the New York Times Best Seller list. Passages from it generated controversy during Santorum's 2006 reelection campaign and his 2012 presidential campaign.

== See also ==
- Students for Academic Freedom
- Traditionalist conservatism in the United States
