= Eugene Webb =

Eugene Webb (born 1938) is Professor Emeritus in the University of Washington Henry M. Jackson School of International Studies. Webb holds a Ph.D., in Comparative Literature from Columbia University (1965), an M.A. in English Literature from Columbia University (1962) and also a B.A., in Philosophy from the University of California, Los Angeles (1960). Webb was a member of the faculties of both the Comparative Literature Department and the Henry M. Jackson School of International Studies, where he served as Associate Director and chaired programs in both Comparative Religion and European Studies (1994). Webb was also the founder of those two programs: Comparative Religion in 1974, and European Studies in 1994. He retired from the University of Washington in 2000, where he now has the title Professor Emeritus of International Studies. Webb has two books on the novels and plays of Samuel Beckett, and has authored the books The Dark Dove: The Sacred and Secular in Modern Literature (1975), Eric Voegelin, Philosopher of History (1981), Philosophers of Consciousness (1988) and The Self Between: From Freud to the New Social Psychology of France (1993), all published by the University of Washington Press. His book World View and Mind: Religious Thought and Psychological Development was published by the University of Missouri Press in 2009, and his In Search of the Triune God: The Christian Paths of East and West was published by the same press in 2014. Webb translated and wrote the introduction to Jean-Michel Oughourlian's, The Puppet of Desire: The Psychology of Hysteria, Possession, and Hypnosis, (Stanford: Stanford University Press, 1991). He also translated a second book by Oughourlian, The Genesis of Desire, published by Michigan State University Press in 2010.

== Academic positions ==
- Professor Emeritus of International Studies, University of Washington, 2000
- Professor of Comparative Literature and Comparative Religion, UW, 1975
- Associate Professor of English and Comparative Literature, UW, 1974
- Associate Professor of English, UW, 1973
- Assistant Professor of English, UW, 1966
- Assistant Professor of English, Simon Fraser University, 1965

=== Principal administrative functions ===
- Associate Director, Jackson School of International Studies, 1997–2000
- Chairman, European Studies Program, 1994–98
- Executive Committee, Comparative Literature Department, 1990–93
- Executive Committee, Ph.D. Program in Literary Theory, 1990–93
- Steering Committee, Comparative History of Ideas, 1978–2000.
- Acting Chairman, Department of Romance Languages and Literature, 1985–86
- Faculty Senate, 1984
- College Council, College of Arts and Sciences, 1976–79, Spring 1987
- Chairman, Comparative Religion Program, 1973–85

== Works ==
- In Search of The Triune God: The Christian Paths of East and West (Columbia, MO: University of Missouri Press, 2014)
- Worldview and Mind: Religious Thought and Psychological Development (Columbia, MO: University of Missouri Press, 2009)
- The Self Between: From Freud to the New Social Psychology of France (Seattle and London: University of Washington Press, 1993)
- Philosophers of Consciousness: Polanyi, Lonergan, Voegelin, Ricoeur, Girard, Kierkegaard (Seattle and London: University of Washington Press, 1988).
- Eric Voegelin: Philosopher of History (Seattle and London: University of Washington Press, 1981).
- The Dark Dove: The Sacred and Secular in Modern Literature (Seattle and London: University of Washington Press, 1975).
- The Plays of Samuel Beckett (Seattle: University of Washington Press; London: Peter Owen, 1972).
- Samuel Beckett: A Study of His Novels (Seattle: University of Washington Press; London: Peter Owen, 1970).

=== Articles ===
- "Eros and The Psychology of World Views", Anthropoetics XII, 1 (Spring / Summer 2006)
- "Voegelin’s Gnosticism Reconsidered." Political Science Reviewer, 34 (2005): 48–76.
- "René Girard and the Symbolism of Religious Sacrifice", Anthropoetics 11, no. 1 (Spring / Summer 2005)
- "Girard, Sacrifice, and Religious Symbolism." Journal of European Psychoanalysis, 14 (Winter–Spring, 2002): 59–79.
- "Eros und die Psychologie der Weltanschauungen" in Kulturen des Eros (Eranos Jahrbuch, neue folge., vol. 8: 179–229). Munich: Wilhelm Fink Verlag, 2001. Also in Russian translation in Arba (online periodical) (in Russian)
- "Eric Voegelin and Literary Theory", in Politics, Order and History: Essays on the Work of Eric Voegelin, ed. Glenn Hughes, Stephen A. McKnight, and Geoffrey L. Price. Sheffield: Sheffield Academic Press, 2001.
- "Spiritual Disorientation and Voegelinian Postmodernism", review of Glenn Hughes, ed., The Politics of the Soul: Eric Voegelin on Religious Experience, and David Walsh, Guarded By Mystery: Meaning in a Postmodern Age. The Review of Politics, 62, no. 4 (Fall, 2000): 823–827
- "Le Désir philosophique", in Le Désir: Énergie et finalité, ed. Jean-Michel Oughourlian. Paris: L’Harmattan, 1999.
- "Persuasion and the Problem of Polarizing Rhetoric." Voegelin Research News, 4, no. 4 (August 1998).
- "Ernest Becker and the Psychology of Worldviews." Zygon: Journal of Religion and Science, 33, no. 1 (March 1998): 71–86.
- "Le Differenziazioni della coscienza." In La Scienza dell’ ordine: Saggi su Eric Voegelin, ed. Gian Franco Lami and Giovanni Franchi. Rome: Antonio Pellicani Editore, 1997.
- "Mimesis, Evolution, and Differentiation of Consciousness." Paragrana: Internationale Zeitschrift für Historische Anthropologie, 4, no. 2 (1995): 151–165.
- "Objective and Existential Truth in Politics." Public Affairs Quarterly, 9 (no. 2, April, 1995), pp. 93–99.
- "Epilogue: The Symbolism of Political Community." In Render Unto Caesar: The Religious Sphere in world Politics, edited by Sabrina Petra Ramet and Donald W. Treadgold (Washington, DC: American University Press, 1995), pp. 433–446.
- "The Ambiguity of Political Community." Hellas, 5, 2 (Winter 1994): 52–61.
- "Socrates, Modernism, and the Problem of a Genuine Postmodernism." In Plato and Postmodernism (Glenside, PA: The Aldine Press, 1994), pp. 29–39.
- "The New Social Psychology of France: The Heritage of Jacques Lacan." Religion (1993) 23: 61–69.
- "The New Social Psychology of France: The Girardian School." Religion (1993) 23: 255–63.
- "The Epochal Particularism of Modernity." Gallatin Review 12 (no. 1, Winter 1992–93): 87–95.
- "Socrates, Modernity, Postmodernism." Hellas, 3, 1 (Spring 1992): 27–41.
- "Augustine's New Trinity: The Anxious Circle of Metaphor." In Innovation in Religious Traditions: Essays in the Interpretation of Religious Change, ed. Michael A. Williams, Collett Cox, and Martin S. Jaffee. Berlin: Mouton de Gruyter, 1992. Pp. 191–214.
- "Religion, Modernity, and the Humanities", Religious Studies and Theology, 11, nos. 2 & 3 (1991): 18–35.
- "Recent French Psychoanalytic Thought and the Psychology of Religion." Religious Studies and Theology, 8, nos. 1 & 2 (January, May, 1988): 31–44.
- "The Ecumenical Significance of Lonergan's Theological Method." Ecumenical Trends, 17, no. 4 (April 1988): 49–52.
- "Metaphysics or Existenzerhellung: A Comparison of Lonergan and Voegelin." Religious Studies and Theology, 7, nos. 2+3 (1987): 36–47.
- "The Hermeneutic of Greek Trinitarianism: An Approach Through Intentionality Analysis." In Religion in Context, ed. Timothy P. Fallon and Philip Boo Riley. Lanham, Maryland: University Press of America, 1988.
- "Politics and the Problem of a Philosophical Rhetoric in the Thought of Eric Voegelin", Journal of Politics, 48, 1 (1986): 260–273.
- "The Alchemy of Man and the Alchemy of God: The Alchemist as Cultural Symbol in Modern Thought", Religion and Literature 17, 1 (Spring 1985): 47–60.
- "Eric Voegelin (1901–1985) : Eulogy at Stanford Memorial Chapel." Sequoia, 29, no. 2 (1985): 96–98.
- "The Pneumatology of Bernard Lonergan: A Byzantine Comparison", Religious Studies and Theology 5, 2 (1985): 13–23.
- "Mesopotamian Religion", in Denise L.Carmody and John T. Carmody, Ways to the Center: An Introduction to World Religions, Second edition (Belmont, Calif.: Wadsworth Publishing, 1984), pp. 199–205.
- "Faith, Truth and Persuasion in the Thought of Eric Voegelin", in Voegelin and the Theologian: Ten Studies in Interpretation, Toronto Studies in Theology, Vol. 10, ed. John Kirby and William M. Thompson. (New York and Toronto: Edwin Mellen Press, 1983), pp. 356–69.
- "Luther and Zen: Cultural Implications of Doctrines of Sudden Deliverance", in Michael A. Williams, ed., Charisma and Sacred Biography, Journal of the American Academy of Religion Thematic Studies, 48, 3 and 4 (1982): 69–86.
- "The Spiritual Crisis of Modernity: Keynes, Beckett, Baudelaire." Soundings: An Interdisciplinary Journal 62, 2 (Summer 1979): 131–143.
- "Eric Voegelin's Theory of Revelation." The Thomist, 42, 1 (January 1978): 95–122. Reprinted in Eric Voegelin's Thought: A Critical Appraisal, ed. Ellis Sandoz. Durham: Duke University Press, 1982, pp. 157–78.
- "Self and Cosmos: Religion as Strategy and Exploration in the Novels of E. M. Forster." Soundings: An Interdisciplinary Journal, 59, 2 (Summer 1976): 186–203.
- "George Herbert and the Language of Disclosure." West Coast Review 10, 3 (February 1976): 44–46.
- "Pozzo in Bloomsbury: A Possible Allusion in Beckett's Waiting for Godot." Journal of Modern Literature 5, 2 (April 1976): 326–331.
- "Yukio Mishima's Cosmology." West Coast Review 10, l (June 1975): 48–53.
- "The Religious Thought of W. H. Auden: The Ambiguity of the Sacred." Soundings: An Interdisciplinary Journal 58, 4 (Winter 1974): 439–57.
- "Hermine and the Problem of Harry's Failure in Hesse's Steppenwolf." Modern Fiction Studies 18, 7 (1971): 115–24.
- "Criticism and the Creative Process." West Coast Review 2, 2 (Fall 1967): 13–20.

== See also ==
- Comparative religion
- Henotheism
