= Bruce Walker Ferguson =

American lawyer, businessman (born 1954)

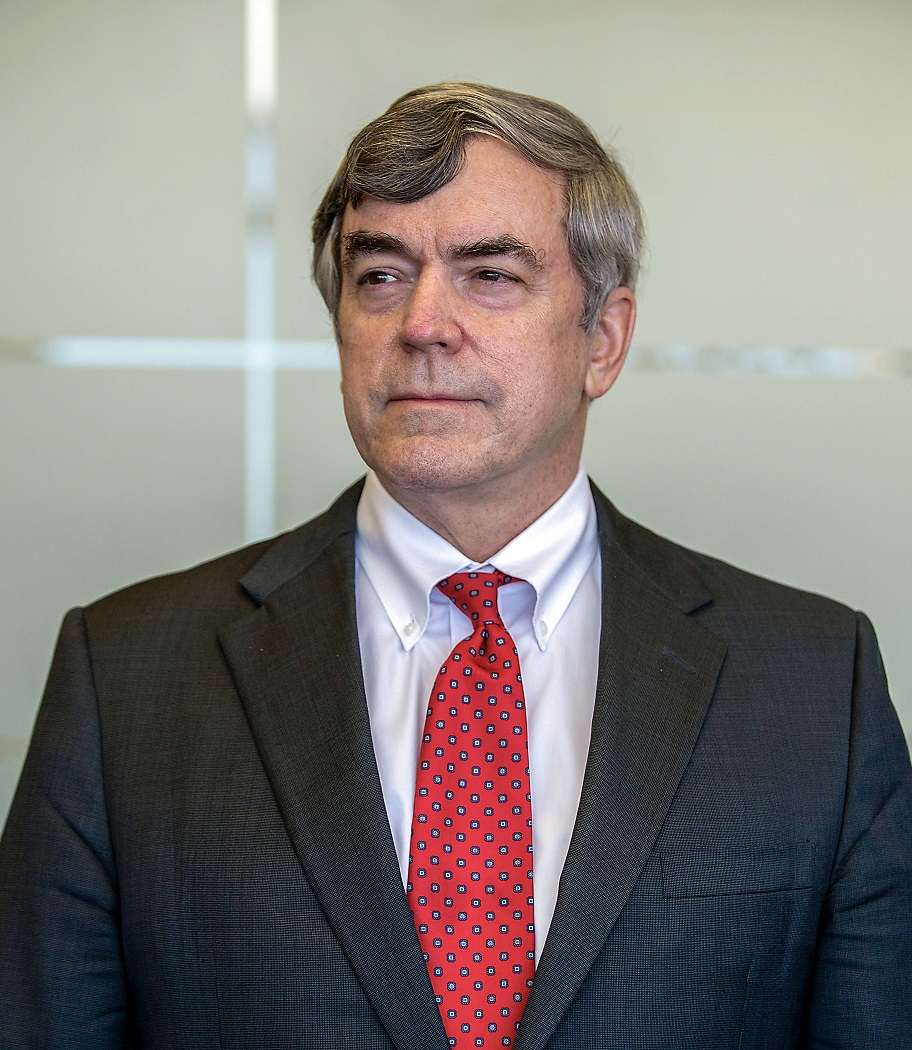
- Born: 1954 (age 71–72); United States
- Education: Harvard University
- Spouse: Heather R. Sandiford (m. 1976)
- Children: Rennie Ferguson, Walker Ferguson
- Website: en.wikipedia.org/wiki/Orbital_Sciences_Corporation

Bruce Walker Ferguson is an educator, entrepreneur and lawyer who is a former President of the American University of Iraq, Sulaimani and a co-founder of Orbital Sciences Corporation.

== Early life and education ==
Bruce Walker Ferguson was born in Washington D.C. in 1954. He attended schools in Washington, D.C., Maryland, Thailand, Kenya, Lebanon, New York, and New Hampshire, graduating in 1972 from Phillips Exeter Academy.

After receiving an A.B. degree in Government and a Master of Education from Harvard in 1976, Ferguson was a graduate student in Political Science at the University of Delhi, India on a Rotary International Ambassadorial Scholarship before returning to Harvard to complete a four-year J.D.-M.B.A. joint degree program. At Harvard Law School he served as an Articles Editor of the Harvard Law Review.

Following graduation Ferguson worked at Kirkland & Ellis in Chicago as an attorney in the corporate and securities department, working on mergers and acquisitions and venture capital transactions. Ferguson has been a member of the Illinois Bar Association since 1981.

== Career ==
=== Orbital Sciences ===
At Harvard Business School he met David Thompson and Scott Webster, with whom in 1982 he co-founded Orbital Sciences Corporation to develop commercial opportunities in space. From 1982 to 1993, in positions that included senior vice president, finance and administration; general counsel; and chief operating officer, Ferguson played a role in arranging collaborations and financing for projects such as development of the world's first privately funded orbital launch vehicles: the Space Shuttle-launched Transfer Orbit Stage for boosting spacecraft from Shuttle orbit to geosynchronous orbit and planetary trajectories; the aircraft-launched Pegasus for delivering small research and communications spacecraft into low Earth orbit; and the ground-launched Taurus for delivering larger payloads to Earth orbit. From 1993 to his resignation in 1997, Ferguson's was executive vice president, Communications and Information Systems Group; his activities included management of Orbital's Magellan division that built and marketed commercial Global Positioning System (GPS) receivers, Orbcomm's introduction of low-Earth orbit satellite systems, and Orbimage's introduction of commercial Earth remote sensing services.

=== Edenspace ===
In 1998 Ferguson founded and was the first president of Edenspace Systems Corporation, a privately held plant biotechnology company that bioengineered crop plants to increase livestock nutrition and to assist in biomass pretreatment and enzymatic hydrolysis for ethanol production. However, public concerns about bioengineered crops and the consequent delays and high cost of obtaining regulatory approvals (estimated to total up to $15 million for each new bioengineered crop variety) made commercial development of this technology impractical. Edenspace terminated most of its research and development in 2011, when Ferguson stepped down as president.

=== Masdar Institute of Science and Technology ===
In 2012, Ferguson joined the Masdar Institute of Science and Technology in Abu Dhabi as Professor of Practice, Engineering Systems and Management. He formed and led a new Institute Center for Innovation and Entrepreneurship and developed new course content on entrepreneurship, led the creation of a $7 million collaboration with BP Ventures on technology innovation, and helped to develop a new space graduate degree program with Yahsat and Orbital ATK.

=== American University of Iraq, Sulaimani ===
Ferguson was named AUIS president on August 1, 2016, succeeding Dr. Esther Mulnix who had served as interim president since January, 2015. During Ferguson's tenure, AUIS was the first Kurdistan Region private university to receive accreditation from the central government in Baghdad, and added new majors in Dentistry, Pharmacy, AI & Robotics Engineering, Software Engineering, Civil Engineering, Medical Laboratory Science, Translation, and Law. In July 2024, Ferguson retired as AUIS’s longest-serving president.

=== Honors ===
From 1993 to 2019, Ferguson was a Trustee of the Carnegie Institution for Science, serving 2013–2019, as Vice Chair.

Ferguson received the Harvard Business School Alumni Achievement Award and Aviation Week & Space Technology Laurels Award.

== Personal life and family ==
Ferguson is married to Heather R. Sandiford, who received an A.B. from Harvard University and an M.B.A. from the University of Chicago. He and Heather have two children. Ferguson has a sister, Sherry Ferguson Zoellick, and brother, Scott Ferguson.

Ferguson's father, Glenn Walker Ferguson, was a director of the Peace Corps in Thailand, the first Director of Volunteers in Service to America (VISTA), U.S. Ambassador to Kenya, head of Radio Free Europe / Radio Liberty, President of the Lincoln Center for the Performing Arts, and former president of four universities. His mother, Patricia Head Ferguson, served as a trustee of Mary Washington College.
