= William Murchison =

American journalist

William Murchison (February 3, 1942 – October 8, 2025) was a nationally syndicated political columnist in the United States. Murchison was normally of a conservative political persuasion. He was also a regular contributor to Watchdog.org, Chronicles and The Lone Star Report.

== Education ==
Murchison obtained his degree from Stanford University and the University of Texas.

== Career ==
Prior to retiring in 2001, he worked as an editor for The Dallas Morning News. Murchison contributed to a number of national publications which include: the Wall Street Journal, National Review, The Weekly Standard, and First Things. He also frequently spoke across the country at colleges and many other forums. He also served, for five years, as a Radford Distinguished Professor of Journalism at Baylor University.

== Books ==
He was the author of several books including:

- Mortal Follies: Episcopalians and the Crisis of Mainline Christianity and a volume about the mid-1990s rise of the religious right
- Reclaiming Morality in America, 1994, Thomas Nelson Publishers
- There's More To Life Than Politics, 1998, Spence Publishing Company
- Those Gasoline Lines and how They Got There, 1980, Fisher Institute

== Organizations ==
He was in addition a member of the Philadelphia Society and was formerly a Director of the Society for the Preservation of the Book of Common Prayer.
