= Wilfred M. McClay =

American historian (born 1951)

Wilfred McClay
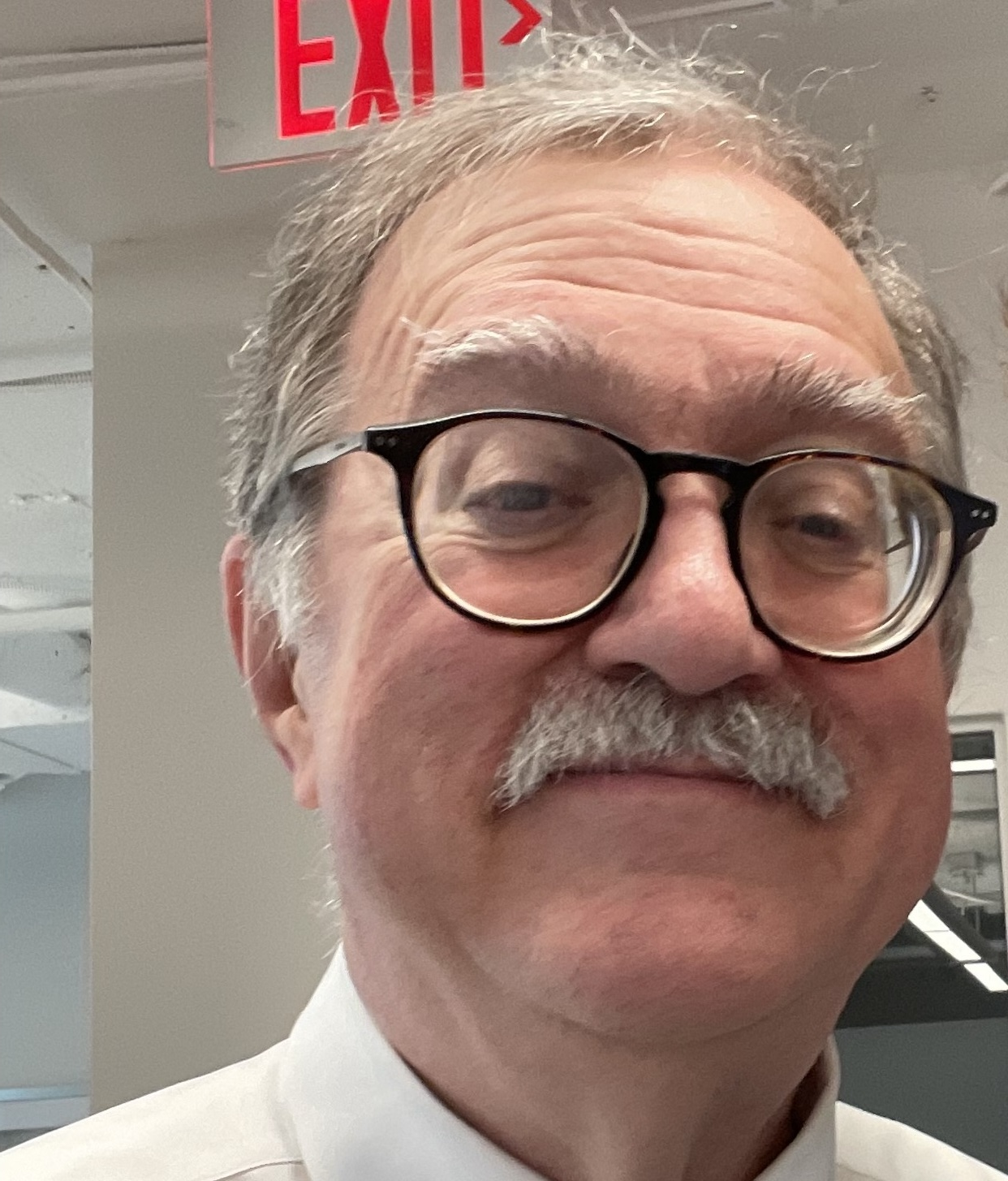
- Born: Wilfred Mark McClay; December 7, 1951 (age 74); Champaign, Illinois, U.S.
- Education: St. John's College (BA, MA); Johns Hopkins University (PhD)
- Occupation: Historian
- Employer(s): University of Oklahoma; Hillsdale College

Wilfred M. McClay (born 1951) is an American academic currently on the faculty of Hillsdale College.

== Early life and education ==
McClay graduated from St. John's College, and received a Ph.D. in history from Johns Hopkins University in 1987.

== Career ==
McClay taught at Georgetown, Tulane, Johns Hopkins, and the University of Dallas before moving to the University of Tennessee at Chattanooga in 1999, where he held the SunTrust Bank Chair of Excellence in Humanities.

McClay is a Senior Scholar at the Woodrow Wilson International Center for Scholars, a Senior Fellow at the Ethics and Public Policy Center and at The Trinity Forum, a member of the Philadelphia Society, and a member of the Society of Scholars at the James Madison Program in American Ideals and Institutions of Princeton University. From 2002 through 2012, he served on the National Council on the Humanities, the advisory board for the National Endowment for the Humanities. He was the President of the Philadelphia Society for the year 2021-2022.

McClay serves on the Board of Visitors of Ralston College and on the editorial/advisory boards of The Wilson Quarterly, First Things, Society, Historically Speaking, The University Bookman, The New Atlantis, and The City.

== Awards ==
- 1995 Merle Curti Award
- 1997-98 Templeton Honor Rolls
- Woodrow Wilson International Center for Scholars
- National Endowment for the Humanities Fellowship
- National Academy of Education Fellowship
- Howard Foundation Fellowship
- Earhart Foundation Fellowship
- Danforth Foundation Fellowship

== Public lectures ==
In 2021, McClay delivered the thirty-fourth Erasmus Lecture, titled The Claims of Memory, hosted by First Things magazine and the Institute on Religion and Public Life. In his lecture, McClay explored the moral and cultural importance of historical memory in shaping identity and civic responsibility. He argued that societies that neglect or distort their collective memory risk losing a sense of moral continuity and purpose, emphasizing the need to recover a truthful and redemptive understanding of the past.

== Writings ==
=== Books ===
- Land of Hope: An Invitation to the Great American Story Encounter Books 2019
- "The Strange Persistence of Guilt" The Hedgehog Review Spring, 2017
- Why Place Matters: Geography, Identity, and Civic Life in Modern America. New Atlantis/Encounter Books. 2014. ISBN 978-1-59403-716-0
- "The Christian Historian and the Idea of Progress" in Confessing History: Explorations of Christian Faith and the Historian's Vocation. University of Notre Dame Press. 2010. ISBN 978-0-268-02903-6.
- The Masterless: Self and Society in Modern America. UNC Press. 1994. ISBN 978-0-8078-4419-9. "Wilfred M. McClay."
- The Student's Guide to U.S. History. ISI Books. 2000. ISBN 978-1-882926-45-9.
- Hugh Heclo; Wilfred M. McClay, eds. (2003). Religion Returns to the Public Square: Faith and Policy in America. Woodrow Wilson Center Press. ISBN 978-0-8018-7195-5.
- Figures in the Carpet: Finding the Human Person in the American Past, editor, Eerdmans, 2007

=== Articles ===
- "Obama’s Middle Eastern Policy and the 2012 Election" The Jerusalem Review November 1, 2012
- "Whig History At Eighty: The Enduring Relevance of Herbert Butterfield and His Most Famous Book" First Things March 2011
- "Keeping Time" First Things June/July 2009
- The Soul and the City The City Summer 2009
- "Mediating Institutions" First Things April 2009
- "Uncomfortable Belief" First Things May 2008
- "Beyond the Right to Life" The New Atlantis, Number 14, Fall 2006
- The Federal Idea Address to the Philadelphia Society, November 1996
- "The Continuing Irony of American History" First Things February 2002
