= Salaam Dunk =

- Directed by: David Fine
- Produced by: Beau Lewis (producer) Peter Furia, San Saravan, Peter Friedrich (co-producers) Kimi Milo, Abigail Weintraub (associate producers)
- Starring: The American University of Iraq – Sulaimani women basketball players and their team coach Ryan Bubalo
- Cinematography: San Saravan, David Fine
- Edited by: David Fine, Bill Weber
- Distributed by: Seedwell Films (also executive producer)
- Release date: November 11, 2011
- Running time: 78 minutes
- Country: United States
- Languages: English, Arabic, Kurdish

Salaam Dunk is a 2011 American documentary film directed by David Fine about an Iraqi university's women basketball program, spearheaded by a US-born instructor as coach.

== Synopsis ==
The film follows the women's basketball team of The American University of Iraq – Sulaimani in Iraqi Kurdistan for a full academic year. The players discover what it means to be students, athletes and friends in the difficult political, economic, cultural and ethnic/sectarian divide, and how basketball unites them around a game. The film follows the lives of some of the players, notably Laylan (team captain), Enji, Ola and Safa, and their basketball coach Ryan Bubalo, who is the university's contractual English language teacher. The film is a testament to the perseverance of a handful of young Iraqi women, and is a story of triumph in the face of chaos and adversity.

== Reception and awards ==
The film gained mostly positive reviews. It also became part of the Nike Jordans Rise Above campaign, which featured basketball team captain Laylan in a five-minute presentation.

Special selection

The film was an official selection at various festivals, including:

- International Documentary Film Festival Amsterdam
- Both New York and London Human Rights Watch Film festivals
- Toronto International Film Festival's Kids section
- DOXA Documentary Film Festival in Vancouver
- Doha Tribeca Film Festival

Doha Tribeca flew the entire basketball team (17 young women) from Iraq to Doha for the screening of the film, where they met their previous coach Ryan Bubalo, who had flown in from the US to attend the screening.

Awards

Salaam Dunk won several awards at film festivals:

- It won the Gold Plaque for "Best Documentary" award at the 2011 Chicago International Film Festival. It was also nominated for the Gold Hugo "Best Documentary" award.
- It won the Grand Jury Award for "Best Documentary feature" at the Florida Film Festival in 2012
- It won the Grand Jury Award at the Nashville Film Festival.
