= Philadelphia Society =

Education organization

Coordinates: 42°55′38″N 85°39′27″W

The Philadelphia Society
- Formation: 1964; 62 years ago
- Headquarters: Jerome, Michigan
- President: Mike Munger
- Budget: Revenue: $259,247; Expenses: $281,770 (FYE December 2011)
- Website: www.phillysoc.org

The Philadelphia Society is a membership organization the purpose of which is "to sponsor the interchange of ideas through discussion and writing, in the interest of deepening the intellectual foundation of a free and ordered society, and of broadening the understanding of its basic principles and traditions". The membership of the Society tends to be composed of persons holding conservative or libertarian political views, and many of those associated with the Society have exercised considerable influence over the development of the conservative movement in the United States.

== History ==
The Philadelphia Society was founded in 1964 by Donald Lipsett in conjunction with William F. Buckley Jr., Milton Friedman, Frank Meyer, and Ed Feulner.

Former presidents of the Society include: Henry Regnery, Edwin Feulner, Russell Kirk, Mel Bradford, Forrest McDonald, T. Kenneth Cribb, M. Stanton Evans, Ellis Sandoz, Edwin Meese, Claes G. Ryn, Midge Decter, Roger Ream, Steven F. Hayward, Lee Edwards, and George H. Nash.

Former trustees of the Society include: William F. Buckley Jr. (1966–1967 and 1971–1974), and Larry P. Arnn (1994–1997 and 2014–2017).

Notable speakers at past meetings of the Society have included: Larry Arnhart, Andrew Bacevich, Wendell Berry, Robert Bork, Mel Bradford, Warren T. Brookes, William F. Buckley Jr., Vladimir Bukovsky, Ronald Coase, T. Kenneth Cribb, Midge Decter, M. Stanton Evans, Edwin Feulner, Milton Friedman, George Gilder, Victor Davis Hanson, William Hague, S. I. Hayakawa, Friedrich von Hayek, Henry Hazlitt, W.H. Hutt, Herman Kahn, Russell Kirk, Irving Kristol, Erik von Kuehnelt-Leddihn, Forrest McDonald, Edwin Meese, Frank Meyer, Charles Murray, Robert Nisbet, Michael Novak, Richard Pipes, Norman Podhoretz, Henry Regnery, William A. Rusher, Paul Ryan, Ellis Sandoz, Shelby Steele, George J. Stigler, Terry Teachout, Edward H. Teller, and Eric Voegelin.

== Notable members ==
- Manuel Ayau
- Stephen Balch
- Stephen J. Blackwood
- Richard Cornuelle
- Donald J. Devine
- Mark C. Henrie
- G. Philip Hughes
- Giancarlo Ibarguen
- Wilfred M. McClay
- William Murchison
- Avik Roy
- Jacqueline E. Schafer
- Jane S. Shaw
- Lowell C. Smith
- Bradley C. S. Watson
