= Joseph Oughourlian =

French businessman (born 1972)

- Joseph Marie Oughourlian
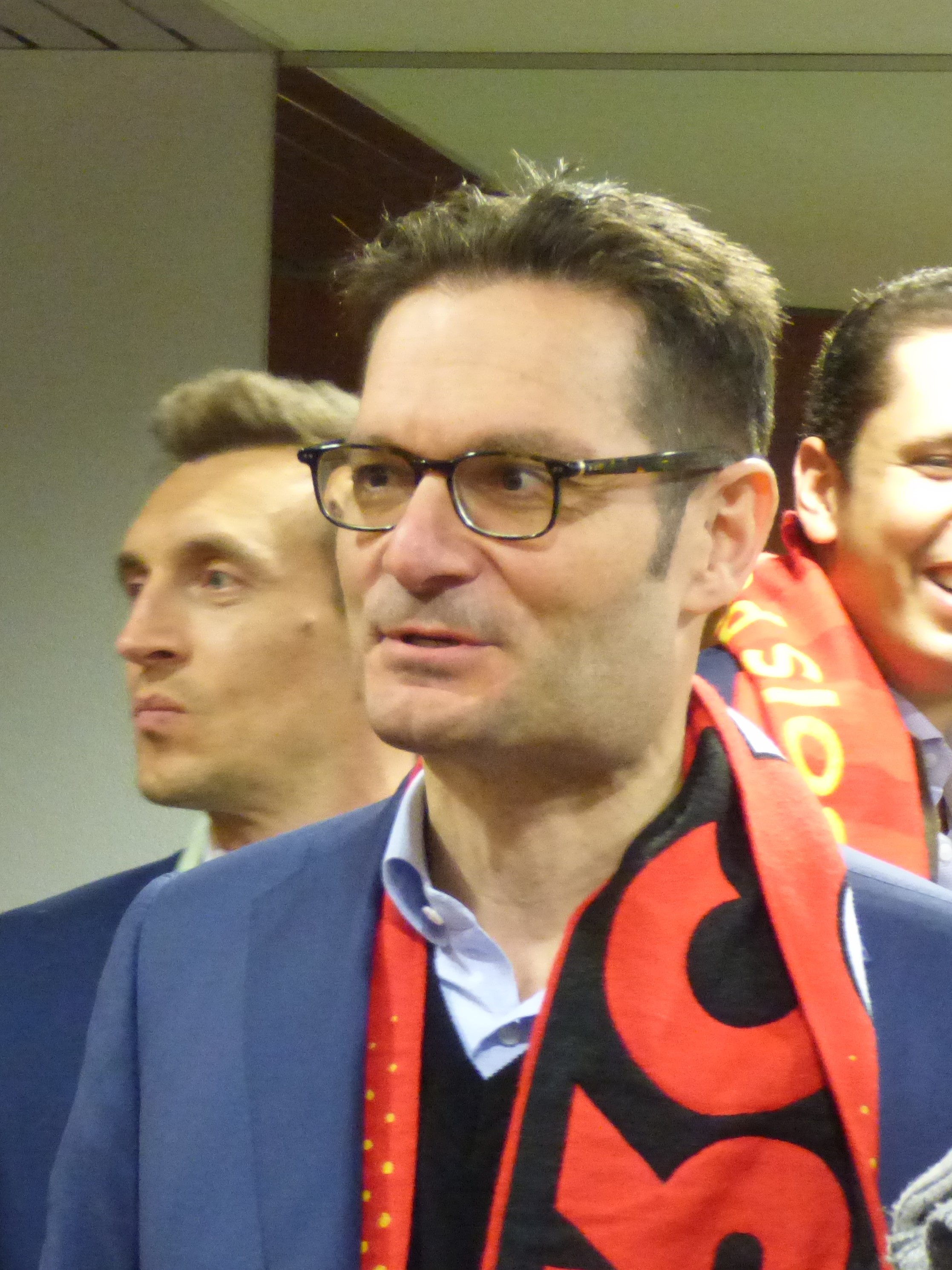
- RC Lens – US Orléans (17-05-2019)
- Born: February 15, 1972 (age 54); Paris, France
- Education: HEC Paris; Sciences Po; Sorbonne
- Occupation: President Prisa
- Years active: since 2010
- Spouse: Jennifer “Jennie” Banks
- Children: 3

Joseph Oughourlian (born 1972), is a French financial businessman. Founder of the activist fund Amber Capital, he invests in football teams.

== Early life ==
Oughourlian was born in Paris on February 15, 1972. He is the son of the neuropsychiatrist Jean-Michel Oughourlian and the grandson of Mr. Oughourlian who was, from 1962 to 1983, first vice-governor of the Banque du Liban (Central Bank of Lebanon) and a survivor of the Armenian genocide. His mother, a nurse, is English.

He attended secondary school at Sainte-Croix de Neuilly, where he obtained his baccalaureate in 1989. He graduated from the École des Hautes Etudes Commerciales de Paris (HEC Paris) and the Institut d'Etudes Politiques de Paris (Sciences Po),. He obtained a master's degree in economics at the Sorbonne.

== Career ==
Oughourlian began his career in cooperation at Société Générale in 1994. In 1996, he moved to New York City where, the following year, he began to manage funds directly for Société Générale. This is how he created in October 2001 the first Amber fund, by split, using seed capital from the bank. He then headed a fund with more than $6 billion in assets.

In 2005, he founded the activist investing fund Amber Capital in New York, but three years later, the 2008 financial crisis undermined his clientele and the assets he managed. In 2012, he relocated the management company to London due to numerous investments in Europe, but also with offices in Milan; Oughourlian has also been investing in around twenty different companies in Italy.

In December 2015, Oughourlian was appointed to the board of directors of the Spanish press group Prisa. On April 29, 2019, he was appointed vice-president, being the main shareholder through the company Amber Capital, then appointed chairman of the board of directors in February 2021. Once his actions in the Lagardère group were completed in France, he invested more particularly in its affairs in Madrid; in 2021 it owned almost a third of the Prisa group while Vivendi, which became a partner following the raid on Lagardère, owned almost a tenth of the shares.

As of March 1, 2020 i.e. after the stock market crash of 2020, Amber Capital managed 1.1 billion euros in assets.

=== Activism ===
Via Amber Capital, Oughourlian has invested in companies that he considered to be badly managed and whose management he sought to influence (activist shareholder). He has refuted the label of activist shareholder and has preferred to define himself as an "active manager".

In 2014, he obtained the departure of Frédéric Vincent from his position as CEO of Nexans. In 2015, he became the first shareholder of Prisa, then forced it to restructure and sell its stake in Le Monde. In 2016, he took a stake in Gameloft and raised the stakes between Vivendi and Ubisoft before allowing Vivendi to win. He also encouraged Total to raise its offer for Saft.

In 2017, he led Solocal to restructure its debt and pushed Lactalis to raise its offer for Parmalat. Two years later, he asked Suez to rethink its strategy and sell its Spanish subsidiary Agbar.

In 2020, he was personally at the origin of a high-profile campaign to oust Arnaud Lagardère, whom he accused of poor management, from his group, by demanding the revocation of Lagardère's supervisory board. This battle of shareholders also became a battle between Oughourlian and Lagardère and lasted four years.

In 2025, Oughourlian was appointed president of the media company PRISA.

== Personal life ==
In 2013, Oughourlian and his wife Jennifer Banks sold their Park Avenue, New York apartment for nearly $13 million. They moved with their three children in 2012 to reside in South Kensington. He speaks fluent English, French, Italian and Spanish.

He has been the Vice President of the Armenian General Benevolent Union in UK since 2010.

He has been one of the main patrons of Sciences Po.

=== Involvement in sports ===
Oughourlian invested from 2015 in the Colombian club Millonarios (Bogota), then in difficulty, but left management to his partner Gustavo Serpa, Colombia is his grandmother's country of origin.

In May 2016, Oughourlian, who ran an ad hoc fund called Solferino, was preferred to two competing offers to buy the football club Racing Club de Lens, in a very delicate financial situation after five consecutive seasons in Ligue 2. His objective was to bring and stabilize the club in Ligue 1. But after a first season where Lens was very close to the rise, the second saw the team sinking into the bottom of the L2 classification. In December 2017 he became the sole shareholder, after the buyout of the minority stake held by Atlético Madrid, and the June 16, 2018, chairman of the board of directors. In 2019, Oughourlian recovered the club financially, reducing its losses from 17 million euros to 3 million, improving its management, assisted by a general manager, Arnaud Pouille. Oughourlian claimed a policy of accessible prices for supporters, with whom he evoked a “contract”: “Low prices will stay low”. He declared in December 2019 that "his secret dream is to bring Europe back to Bollaert", while Lens was still in Ligue 2. Accession to L1 will be obtained at the end of the 2019–2020 season, cut short by the COVID-19 pandemic. In July 2020, he became president of the new women's Racing Club de Lens.

After the rise of RC Lens in the elite, the shareholder continued to invest with personal funds, financing the recruitment of players with several million euros. In particular, he brought in the Ivorian player Seko Fofana in the summer of 2020, the biggest transfer in the history of the club. The recognition of his peers club presidents allows him to be elected to the board of directors of the Professional Football League in November 2022. In May 2023, Mr. Oughourlian's wish came true: after 16 years of absence, Lens qualified for a European Cup, the most prestigious, the Champions League. With this success, he managed to bring with him new shareholders.

In December 2017, he also became a shareholder of Calcio Padua, an Italian football club playing in Serie C, promoted to Serie B in 2018–2019.

== Sources ==
- Gilles Fontaine, "Portrait de Mr. Oughourlian (Amber Capital)", Challenges, n^{o} 693, 8 avril 2021, p. 40–43 (ISSN 0751-4417).
