= Hiwa Osman =

Iraqi Kurdish journalist and commentator

Hiwa Osman is the director general of 964media.com the first Iraqi news platform that provides verified local news in Arabic, Kurdish and English. He is an Iraqi Kurdish journalist and commentator. He served as media advisor to President Jalal Talabani between 2005 & 2008. He is a leading commentator and analyst on the politics and media of Kurdistan and Iraq. He is often quoted by the media about Iraq and Kurdistan. Aside from Kurdish, his writings are also published in Arabic in the respected Baghdad-based newspaper Alaalem.

== Career ==
Hiwa Osman is the CEO of mediazan.org The first agency of its kind in Kurdistan Region that provides media, which later rebranded to Mediazan.org which is the parent organization behind Iraqi news outlet +964 Media creative and communications services. Osman was previously the Iraq Country Director for the Institute for War and Peace Reporting (IWPR), media advisor to Iraqi president Jalal Talabani and also worked as a writer and producer with BBC News. He is also the son of Kurdish Leader Dr. Mahmoud Othman.

== Awards ==
In 2012, Hiwa Osman won the Outstanding Contribution to New Media Award at the International Media Awards in London on 5 May.
