= The New Science of Politics =

1952 book by Eric Voegelin

The New Science of Politics: An Introduction
- Title page for The New Science of Politics: An Introduction (1952)
- Author: Eric Voegelin
- Language: English
- Publisher: University of Chicago Press
- Publication place: United States
- Pages: 1952

The New Science of Politics: An Introduction is a 1952 book by the American-German philosopher Eric Voegelin. It is about political representation and revolutionary political tendencies, which Voegelin interprets as modern Gnosticism.
