= Eric Voegelin =

American philosopher (1901–1985)

- Born: Erich Hermann Wilhelm Vögelin; January 3, 1901; Cologne, Kingdom of Prussia, German Empire
- Died: January 19, 1985 (aged 84); Stanford, California, U.S.

Education
- Education: University of Vienna
- Doctoral advisor: Hans Kelsen

Philosophical work
- Era: 20th-century philosophy
- Region: Western philosophy
- School: Perennial philosophy
- Main interests: Consciousness; existence; history; political science; spirituality; Anamnesis (philosophy)
- Notable ideas: Metaxy as the permanent place where man is in-between two poles of existence; Criticism of Gnosticism; "Don't immanentize the eschaton"

Eric Voegelin (born Erich Hermann Wilhelm Vögelin, German: [ˈføːgəliːn]; January 3, 1901 – January 19, 1985) was a German and American political philosopher. He was born in Cologne, and educated in political science at the University of Vienna, where he became an associate professor of political science in the law faculty. In 1938, he and his wife fled from the Nazi forces which had entered Vienna. They emigrated to the United States, where they became citizens in 1944. He spent most of his academic career at Louisiana State University, the Ludwig-Maximilians-Universität München, and the Hoover Institution of Stanford University.

== Early life ==
Voegelin was born in Cologne on January 3, 1901. His parents moved to Vienna in 1910, and he eventually studied at the University of Vienna. The advisers on his dissertation were Hans Kelsen and Othmar Spann. After his habilitation there in 1928, he taught political theory and sociology. In Austria, Voegelin began lasting friendships with Alfred Schütz and with Friedrich Hayek.

== Career ==
As a result of the Anschluss in 1938, Voegelin was fired from his job. Narrowly avoiding arrest by the Gestapo and after a brief stay in Switzerland, he arrived in the United States. He taught at various universities before he joined Louisiana State University's Department of Government in 1942. Voegelin remained in Baton Rouge until 1958, when he accepted an offer by Munich's Ludwig-Maximilians-Universität München to fill Max Weber's former chair in political science, which had been unoccupied since Weber's death in 1920. In Munich, he founded the Institut für Politische Wissenschaft. Voegelin returned to the United States in 1969 to join Stanford University's Hoover Institution on War, Revolution, and Peace as Henry Salvatori Fellow. There he continued his work until his death. He was a member of the Philadelphia Society.

Although some have found his books obscure, according to his student Ellis Sandoz, he was a "wonderfully lucid lecturer with the gift of explaining with complete intelligibility the most abstruse theories to the comprehension and fascination" of his students.

== Work ==
In his later life Voegelin worked to account for the endemic political violence of the twentieth century, in an effort variously referred to as a philosophy of politics, history, or consciousness. In Voegelin's Weltanschauung, he "blamed a flawed utopian interpretation of Christianity for spawning totalitarian movements like Nazism and Communism." Voegelin eschewed any ideological labels or categorizations that readers and followers attempted to impose on his work. Nevertheless, his work came to the forefront during the Cold War and was adopted mainly by conservatives.

Voegelin published scores of books, essays, and reviews in his lifetime. An early work was Die politischen Religionen (1938; The Political Religions), on totalitarian ideologies as political religions due to their structural similarities to religion. He wrote the multi-volume (English-language) Order and History, which began publication in 1956 and remained incomplete at the time of his death 29 years later. His 1951 Charles Walgreen lectures, published as The New Science of Politics, is sometimes seen as a prolegomenon to this series, and remains his best known work. He left many manuscripts unpublished, including a history of political ideas, which has since been published in eight volumes.

Order and History was originally conceived as a five-volume examination of the history of order occasioned by Voegelin's personal experience of the disorder of his time. The first three volumes, Israel and Revelation, The World of the Polis, and Plato and Aristotle, appeared in rapid succession in 1956 and 1957, and focused on the evocations of order in the ancient Near East and Greece.

Voegelin then encountered difficulties which slowed down the publication. This, combined with his university administrative duties and work related to the new institute, meant that seventeen years separated the fourth from the third volume. His new concerns were indicated in the 1966 German collection Anamnesis: Zur Theorie der Geschichte und Politik. The fourth volume, The Ecumenic Age, appeared in 1974. It broke with the chronological pattern of the previous volumes by investigating symbolizations of order ranging in time from the Sumerian King List to Hegel. Work on the final volume, In Search of Order, occupied Voegelin's final days and it was published posthumously in 1987.

One of Voegelin's main points in his later work is that our experience of transcendence conveys a sense of order. Although transcendence can never be fully defined or described, it may be conveyed in symbols. A particular sense of transcendent order serves as a basis for a particular political order. A philosophy of consciousness can therefore become a philosophy of politics. Insights may become fossilised as dogma.

Voegelin is more interested in the ontological issues that arise from these experiences than the epistemological questions of how we know that a vision of order is true or not. Nevertheless, for Voegelin the essence of truth is trust. All philosophy begins with experience of the divine. Since God is experienced as good, one can be confident that reality is knowable. Here Voegelin is simply repeating the classical Greek argument (See "Science, Politic, and Gnosticism"), which was also taken up by Descartes in the Second Meditation. Given the possibility of knowledge, Voegelin holds there are two modes: intentionality and luminosity. Intentionality is like a spotlight focusing on a single element on a stage, and luminosity is like a floodlight showing the context. Visions of order belong to the latter category. The truth of any vision is confirmed by its orthodoxy, by what Voegelin jokingly calls its lack of originality. ("Equivalences of Experience and Symbolization In History") A further crucial element of Voegelin's epistemology is the distinction between an experience of reality and its symbolization. Experiences may be "equivalent", but the symbolization will be inferior if it belies a deformed existence under God. (See "On Hegel: A Study in Sorcery" and "Immortality: Experience and Symbol") This is clear, for example, in the differing accounts of anxiety given by Kierkegaard and Sartre, or in the different interpretations of the experience of isness given by Ekhart and Heidegger.

Voegelin's work does not fit in any standard classifications, although some of his readers have found similarities in it to contemporaneous works by, for example, Hans Jonas, Ernst Cassirer, Martin Heidegger, and Hans-Georg Gadamer. Voegelin often invents terms or uses old ones in new ways. However, there are patterns in his work with which the reader can quickly become familiar.

According to Ellis Sandoz, Voegelin may well be America's leading philosopher, and is rightly compared with the premier minds of our century and, perhaps, of the millennia. Thomas Altizer has said that Order and History "may someday be perceived as the most important work of Old Testament scholarship ever written in the United States," adding that it is noteworthy that it was written by a political scientist and philosopher.

Among indications of growing engagement with Voegelin's work are the 305 page international bibliography published in 2000 by Munich's Wilhelm Fink Verlag; the presence of dedicated research centers at universities in the United States, Germany, Italy, and the United Kingdom; the appearance of recent translations in languages ranging from Portuguese to Japanese; and the publishing of a 34 volume collection of his primary works by the University of Missouri Press and various primary and secondary works offered by the Eric-Voegelin-Archiv of LMU Munich (Ludwig-Maximilians-Universität München).

== On gnosticism ==
In his The New Science of Politics, Order and History, and Science, Politics and Gnosticism, Voegelin opposed what he believed to be unsound Gnostic influences in politics.

Eugene Webb stated that Voegelin understood "gnosis" as

a purported direct, immediate apprehension or vision of truth without the need for critical reflection; the special gift of a spiritual and cognitive elite

and "gnosticism" as

A type of thinking that claims absolute cognitive mastery of reality. Relying as it does on a claim to gnosis, gnosticism considers its knowledge not subject to criticism. Gnosticism may take transcendentalizing (as in the case of the Gnostic movement of late antiquity) or immanentizing forms (as in the case of Marxism).

Accordingly, Voegelin distinguished between ancient and modern gnosticisms: whereas the former sought salvation in a realm transcending the actual world, the "modern" form aimed to change it immanently (see below).

Apart from the Classical Christian writers against heresy, his sources on Gnosticism were secondary since the texts of the Nag Hammadi library were not yet widely available. For example, Voegelin used Hans Urs von Balthasar, Henri de Lubac, and Hans Jonas.

Voegelin perceived similarities between ancient Gnosticism and modernist political theories, particularly Communism and Nazism. He identified the root of the Gnostic impulse as alienation, that is, a sense of disconnection from society and a belief that this lack is the result of the inherent disorder, or even evil, of the world. That alienation has two effects:

- The first is the belief that the disorder of the world can be transcended by extraordinary insight, learning, or knowledge, called a Gnostic Speculation by Voegelin (he claimed that the Gnostics themselves referred to that as gnosis).
- The second is the desire to implement and or create a policy to actualize the speculation, or Immanentize the eschaton: to create a sort of heaven on earth within history.

According to Voegelin, the Gnostics really reject the Christian eschaton of the kingdom of God and replace it with a human form of salvation through esoteric ritual or practice.

The primary feature that characterizes a tendency as gnostic for Voegelin is that it is motivated by the notion that the world and humanity can be fundamentally transformed and perfected through the intervention of a chosen group of people (an elite), a man-god, or men-Gods. The Übermensch is the chosen one who has a kind of special knowledge (like magic or science) about how to perfect human existence.

That stands in contrast to a notion of redemption that is achieved through the reconciliation of mankind with the divine. Marxism, therefore, qualifies as "gnostic" because it purports that the perfect society on earth can be established once capitalism has been overthrown by the proletariat. Likewise, Nazism is seen as "gnostic" because it posits that utopia can be achieved by attaining racial purity once the master race has freed itself of the racially inferior and the degenerate.

In both cases specifically analyzed by Voegelin, the totalitarian impulse is derived from the alienation of the individuals from the rest of society. That leads to a desire to dominate (libido dominandi), which has its roots in the Gnostic's conviction of the imperative of his vision but also in his lack of concord with a large body of his society. As a result, there is very little regard for the welfare of those who are harmed by the resulting politics, which ranges from coercive to calamitous (such as the English proverb: "You have to crack a few eggs to make an omelet" or its Russian variety: "When you chop wood, chips fly").

=== Immanentizing the eschaton ===
One of his most quoted passages (by such figures as William F. Buckley Jr.) is:

The problem of an eidos in history, hence, arises only when a Christian transcendental fulfillment becomes immanentized. Such an immanentist hypostasis of the eschaton, however, is a theoretical fallacy.

From this comes the catchphrase: "Don't immanentize the eschaton!", which simply means: "Do not try to make that which belongs to the afterlife happen here and now" or "Don't try to create Heaven on Earth."

When Voegelin uses the term gnosis negatively, it is to reflect the word as found in the Manichaeism and Valentinianism of antiquity. As it is later then immanentized (or manifest) in modernity in the wake of Joachim of Fiore and in the various ideological movements outlined in his works. Voegelin also builds on the term "Gnosticism" as it is defined by Hans Jonas in his The Gnostic Religion, in reference to Heidegger's Gnosticism, which is to have an understanding and control over reality that makes mankind as powerful as the role of God in reality.

Voegelin was arguing from a Hellenistic position that good gnosis is derived from pistis (faith) and that the pagan tradition made a false distinction between faith and noesis. Furthermore, the dualist perspective was the very essence of gnosticism via the misuse of noema and caused a destructive division between the internal and external world in human consciousness. To reconcile the internal (subjective) and external (objective) world of consciousness was the restoration of order.

=== Critique of rationalism and phenomenology ===
With the publication of "Über die Form des amerikanischen Geistes" (1928), Voegelin began to investigate the phenomenon of consciousness and, more intricately, its relationship with the symbolic structures that illuminate the representation of order in societies throughout history. However, the difficulties of such an undertaking became apparent when the limitations of Husserlian phenomenology and the critical epistemology in vogue since the end of the 18th century with Kant imposed themselves.

In "Anamnesis" (1966), a letter addressed to his friend Alfred Schütz acts as a preamble to the work, in which Voegelin will explore more analytically the structure of consciousness and its participatory existential illumination. This letter is followed by a critique of the fruitless state of philosophy, with particular emphasis on Phenomenology and Epistemology. For Voegelin, theoretical concern was merely focused on the constitution of the transcendental egoity of objects, characteristic of the subject-object model that emerged with the crisis of European sciences. There was no theoretical concern in explicating the formative experiences of consciousness that lead to symbols of order. For the most part, these were considered devoid of any scientific value.

=== Spiritual revival ===
Voegelin's work does not lay out a program of reform or offer a doctrine of recovery from what he termed the "demono-maniacal" in modern politics. However, interspersed in his writings is the idea of a spiritual recovery of the primary experiences of divine order. He was not interested so much in what religious dogmas might result in personal salvation but rather a recovery of the human in the classical sense of the daimonios aner (Plato's term for "the spiritual man"). He did not speculate on the institutional forms in which a spiritual recovery might take place but expressed confidence that the current 500-year cycle of secularism would come to an end because he stated that "you cannot deny the human forever."

In an essay published in 1965, Voegelin suggested that the Soviet Union would collapse from within because of its historical roots in philosophy and Christianity. Later, at an informal talk given at University College, Dublin, Ireland in 1972, Voegelin suggested the Soviet Union might collapse by 1980 because of its failure to succeed in its domestic commitments and external political challenges.

== Reception ==
Eugene Webb criticized Voegelin's conception of gnosis and his analysis of Gnosticism in general. In the article "Voegelin's Gnosticism Reconsidered," Webb explained that Voegelin's concept of Gnosticism was conceived "not primarily to describe ancient phenomena but to help us understand some modern ones for which the evidence is a great deal clearer." Webb continues, "the category (of Gnosticism) is of limited usefulness for the purpose to which he put it… and the fact that the idea of Gnosticism as such has become so problematic and complex in recent years must at the very least undercut Voegelin's effort to trace a historical line of descent from ancient sources to the modern phenomena he tried to use them to illuminate."

Because Voegelin applied the concept of gnosis to a wide array of ideologies and movements such as Marxism, communism, National Socialism, progressivism, liberalism, and humanism, critics have proposed that Voegelin's concept of Gnosis lacks theoretical precision. Therefore, Voegelin's gnosis can, according to the critics, hardly serve as a scientific basis for an analysis of political movements. Rather, they claim, the term "Gnosticism" as used by Voegelin is more of an invective just as "when on the lowest level of propaganda those who do not conform with one's own opinion are smeared as communists."

== Selected bibliography ==
- Über die Form des amerikanischen Geistes, Tübingen 1928
- Rasse und Staat. Mohr Siebeck, Tübingen 1933
- Die Rassenidee in der Geistesgeschichte von Ray bis Carus. Junker & Dünnhaupt Berlin 1933
- Der autoritäre Staat, Wien 1936
- Die politischen Religionen. Bermann Fischer, Stockholm 1939. Neuauflage München 1996
- The New Science of Politics. An Introduction, Chicago University Press, Chicago 1952
- Order and History, 5 Bde. Baton Rouge 1956–1987
- Wissenschaft, Politik und Gnosis, München 1959, English translation: Science, Politics and Gnosticism, Regnery Publishing Inc., Washington DC, 1968
- Anamnesis. Zur Theorie der Geschichte und Politik, München 1966
- From Enlightment to Revolution, Durham 1975
- Autobiographische Reflexionen, Hg. Peter J. Opitz. München 1994
- Das Volk Gottes. Sektenbewegungen und der Geist der Moderne, München 1994
- Der Gottesmord. Zur Genese und Gestalt der modernen politischen Gnosis, München 1999
- Ordnung und Geschichte, 10 Bde. Hg. Dietmar Herz & Peter Opitz, München 2001–2005
- Die Neue Wissenschaft der Politik, München 2004
- Anamnesis. Zur Theorie von Geschichte und Politik, Freiburg 2005
- Das Drama des Menschseins, Passagen, Wien 2007 ISBN 978-3851657241
- Das Jüngste Gericht Friedrich Nietzsches. Matthes & Seitz, Berlin 2007, ISBN 978-3882218879
- Conversations with Eric Voegelin, Mitschrift von vier Vorlesungen in Montreal in den Jahren 1965, 1967, 1970, 1976. Thomas More Institute, Montreal 1980
- Briefwechsel 1939–1949: Eric Voegelin und Hermann Broch, In: Sinn und Form, Heft 2/2008, S. 149–174
- Briefwechsel, Eric Voegelin und Karl Löwith, In: Sinn und Form, Heft 6/2007, S. 764–794
- Realitätsfinsternis. Übers. Dora Fischer-Barnicol, Hg. und Nachwort Peter J.Opitz. Matthes & Seitz, Berlin 2010 ISBN 978-3882216967
- Was ist Geschichte? Übers. Dora Fischer-Barnicol, Hg. und Vorwort Peter J.Opitz. Matthes & Seitz, Berlin 2015 ISBN 978-3882210460
- Glaube und Wissen. Der Briefwechsel zwischen Eric Voegelin und Leo Strauss von 1934 bis 1964. Hg. Peter J. Opitz; Wilhelm Fink, München 2010 ISBN 978-3770549672
- Luther und Calvin. Die große Verwirrung. Hg. Peter J. Opitz. Wilhelm Fink, München 2011, ISBN 978-3770551590
- Die Natur des Rechts. Übers. und Nachwort Thomas Nawrath. Matthes & Seitz Berlin, Berlin 2012, ISBN 978-3882216172

Rezension

- Die Ursprünge des Totalitarismus, Rezension zu Arendts Totalitarismus-Buch, in: Über den Totalitarismus. Texte Hannah Arendts aus den Jahren 1951 und 1953. S. 33–42. Übers. Ursula Ludz. Hg. Ingeborg Nordmann. HAIT, Dresden 1998 ISBN 3931648176

The Collected Works of Eric Voegelin

- Volume 1: On the Form of the American Mind, edited by Jürgen Gebhardt and Barry Cooper
- Volume 2: Race and State, edited by Klaus Vondung
- Volume 3: The History of the Race Idea: From Ray to Carus, edited by Klaus Vondung
- Volume 4: The Authoritarian State: An Essay on the Problem of the Austrian State, edited by Gilbert Weiss
- Volume 5: Modernity without Restraint: The Political Religions; The New Science of Politics; and Science, Politics, and Gnosticism, edited by Manfred Henningsen
- Volume 6: Anamnesis: On the Theory of History and Politics, edited by David Walsh
- Volume 7: Published Essays, 1922–1928, Edited by Thomas W. Heilke and John von Heyking
- Volume 8: Published Essays, 1929–1933, edited by Thomas W. Heilke and John von Heyking
- Volume 9: Published Essays, 1934–1939, edited by Thomas W. Heilke
- Volume 10: Published Essays, 1940–1952, edited by Ellis Sandoz
- Volume 11: Published Essays, 1953–1965, edited by Ellis Sandoz
- Volume 12: Published Essays, 1966–1985, edited by Ellis Sandoz
- Volume 13: Selected Book Reviews, edited by Jodi Cockerill and Barry Cooper
- Volume 14: Order and History, Volume I, Israel and Revelation, edited by Maurice P. Hogan
- Volume 15: Order and History, Volume II, The World of the Polis, edited by Athanasios Moulakis
- Volume 16: Order and History, Volume III, Plato and Aristotle, edited by Dante Germino
- Volume 17: Order and History, Volume IV, The Ecumenic Age, edited by Michael Franz
- Volume 18: Order and History, Volume V, In Search of Order, edited by Ellis Sandoz
- Volume 19: History of Political Ideas, Volume I, Hellenism, Rome, and Early Christianity, edited by Athanisios Moulakis
- Volume 20: History of Political Ideas, Volume II, The Middle Ages to Aquinas, edited by Peter von Sivers
- Volume 21: History of Political Ideas, Volume III, The Later Middle Ages, edited by David Walsh
- Volume 22: History of Political Ideas, Volume IV, Renaissance and Reformation, edited by David L. Morse and William M. Thompson
- Volume 23: History of Political Ideas, Volume V, Religion and the Rise of Modernity, edited by James L. Wiser
- Volume 24: History of Political Ideas, Volume VI, Revolution and the New Science, edited by Barry Cooper
- Volume 25: History of Political Ideas, Volume VII, The New Order and Last Orientation, edited by Jürgen Gebhardt and Thomas A. Hollweck
- Volume 26: History of Political Ideas, Volume VIII, Crisis and the Apocalypse of Man, edited by David Walsh
- Volume 27: Nature of the Law and Related Legal Writings, edited by Robert Anthony Pascal, James Lee Babin, and John William Corrington
- Volume 28: What Is History? And Other Late Unpublished Writings, edited by Thomas A. Hollweck and Paul Caringella
- Volume 29: Selected Correspondence, 1924–1949, edited with an introduction by Thomas Hollweck
- Volume 30: Selected Correspondence, 1950–1984, edited with an introduction by Thomas Hollweck
- Volume 31: Hitler and the Germans, edited by Detlev Clemens and Brendan Purcell
- Volume 32: The Theory of Governance and Other Miscellaneous Papers, 1921–1938, edited by William Petropulos and Gilbert Weiss
- Volume 33: The Drama of Humanity and Other Miscellaneous Papers, 1939–1985, edited by William Petropulos and Gilbert Weiss
- Volume 34: Autobiographical Reflections: Revised Edition, with a Voegelin Glossary and Cumulative Index, edited with introductions by Ellis Sandoz

== See also ==
- Leo Strauss
