= Max Rodenbeck =

British-American journalist and foreign affairs expert

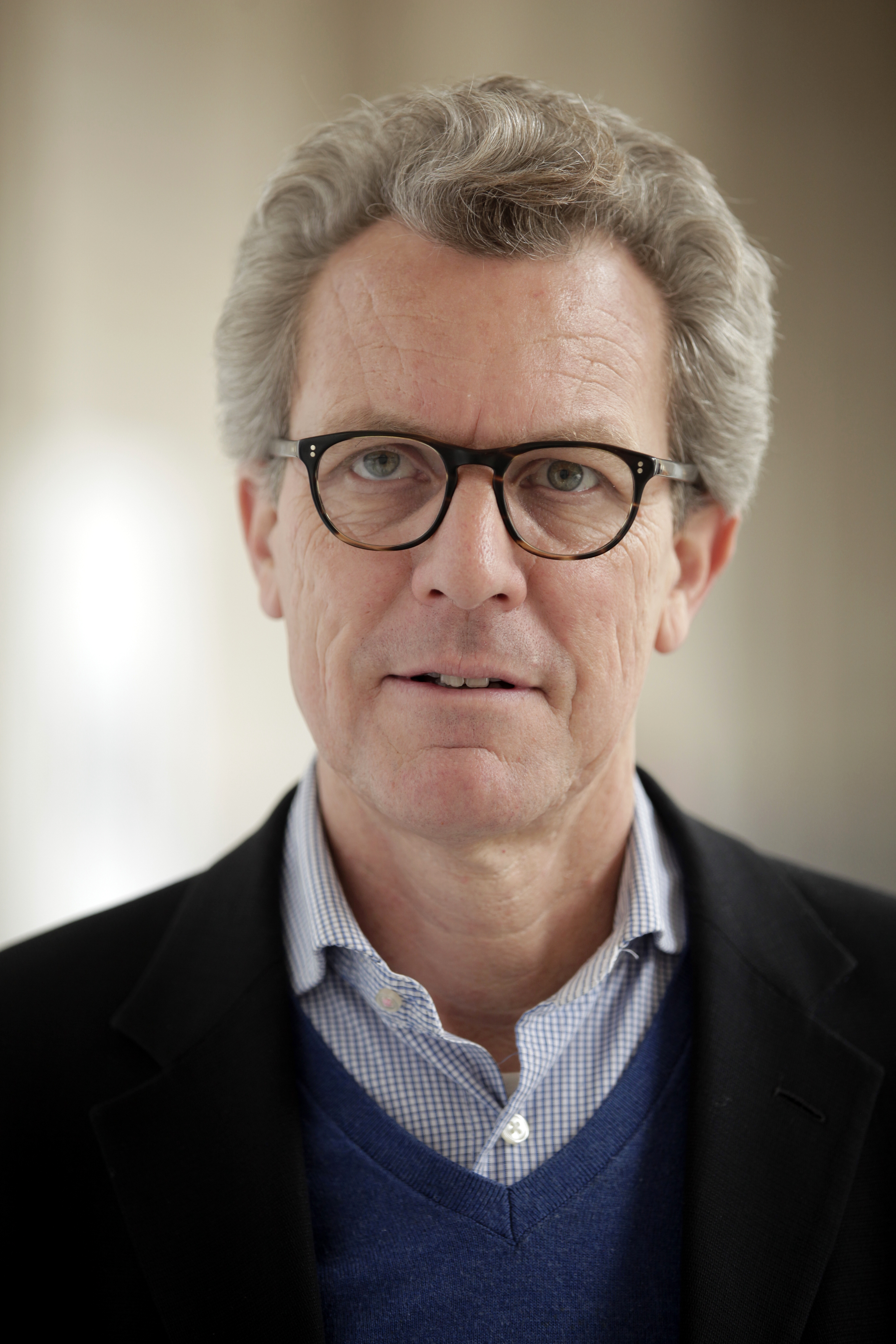
Max Rodenbeck at the Woodrow Wilson Center

Max Rodenbeck is a British/American journalist and author based in London . He is currently the Israel/Palestine Director at the International Crisis Group. Previously, he was the Culture Correspondent for The Economist magazine, where he wrote on international affairs for over 20 years. He was previously The Economist's Berlin Bureau Chief in Berlin, South Asia Bureau Chief in New Delhi from 2016 to 2022 and Middle East Bureau Chief in Cairo from 2000 to 2015. He is the author of the critically acclaimed Cairo: The City Victorious, regarded as one of the best single-volume biographies of the city available, and is a contributor to the New York Review of Books, the New York Times and Foreign Policy magazine. He has been described as "one of the foremost experts on today’s Middle East".

== Early life and education ==
Max Rodenbeck was born in Charlottesville, Virginia, to a British mother and American father. His family moved to Cairo when he was two years old, and he was raised between Egypt, Britain and the US. Following boarding school in Massachusetts, he studied Arabic and Islamic History at the American University in Cairo.

== Writing ==
=== Journalism ===
Rodenbeck began covering Egypt and the Middle East as a stringer for The Economist, while also writing as a freelancer for the Financial Times, Middle East International, The Cairo Times and numerous other publications. In 2000 he was appointed Middle East Bureau Chief for The Economist, covering the region from Iran to Morocco. During his 15 years in this post he covered events ranging from the toppling of Saddam Hussein and the US occupation of Iraq, to the failed revolutions of 2009 in Iran, and the Arab Spring in 2011. Notably, Rodenbeck's reportage in 2010 correctly predicted the eruption of the Arab Spring. Since January 2016 he has been South Asia Bureau Chief for The Economist, based in Delhi.

=== Cairo: The City Victorious ===
Rodenbeck's historical portrait of Egypt's capital, Cairo: The City Victorious, was first published by Picador in the UK, and Alfred A. Knopf in New York, where it met wide critical acclaim. The work "traces the life of Cairo from birth...through the heights of medieval splendor, and on to the present day". In its review of the book, The Washington Post Book World described Cairo as "an enormously entertaining read... Rodenbeck's lively and affectionate portrait...veers easily between past and present, personal and historical." The book was cited as "a book to read" by the New York Review of Books, as one of the five best travel books of the year by The Sunday Times, and "the most authoritative and entertaining read on the convoluted and picturesque 1000-year history of the Egyptian capital” by Lonely Planet.Cairo: The City Victorious has since been translated into eight languages.

== Media appearances and fellowships ==
Rodenbeck has been interviewed on Charlie Rose, with Christiane Amanpour on CNN, on National Public Radio (NPR), The Wire (India), as well as The Economist Radio, and podcasts such as The Arabist. Rodenbeck has also been a regular panelist at the annual Jaipur Literary Festival in Rajasthan, India, and was a visiting fellow at the Woodrow Wilson International Center for Scholars in Washington DC in 2015.
