= Ellis Sandoz =

American professor of political science (1931–2023)

Ellis Sandoz Jr. (10 February 1931 – 19 September 2023) was an American academic and political scientist. He was the Hermann Moyse Jr. Distinguished Professor of Political Science and Director of the Eric Voegelin Institute for American Renaissance Studies at Louisiana State University. Sandoz was also the chairman of that department.

== Biography ==
Ellis Sandoz was born in New Orleans, Louisiana on February 10, 1931.

A native of Louisiana whose family first came there from Switzerland in 1829, he was a United States Marine Corps veteran (1953–1956). He was educated at Louisiana State University (B. A., 1951; M. A., 1953), also at the University of North Carolina, Georgetown University, Heidelberg University, and LMU Munich, where he completed his doctorate (Dr. oec. publ.) with Eric Voegelin in 1965, Sandoz is the only American to do so. Sandoz joined Louisiana State University faculty in 1978. Sandoz was a specialist in the field of political philosophy (American, European, and Russian), and he approached problems of public policy from that perspective. President Ronald W. Reagan appointed him to the National Council on the Humanities in 1982 for a six-year term. The Board of Foreign Scholarships in 1987 named him a Fulbright 40th Anniversary Distinguished American Scholar to represent the United States in Italy and lecture on the Constitution during the U.S. Bicentennial. He founded and remained secretary of the Eric Voegelin Society. He was elected president of the Philadelphia Society in April 2000.

Sandoz died on September 19, 2023, at the age of 92.

== Studies ==
Sandoz, as Director of the Eric Voegelin Institute for American Renaissance Studies, established in 1987, devoted himself to research, publications, and conferences on political philosophy and constitutionalism.

=== Constitutionalism ===
After the Velvet Revolution of 1989, Sandoz addressed the Federal Assembly of Czechoslovakia and conducted lectures and a series of conferences on The Federalist Papers, and other aspects of the Anglo-American constitutionalism and liberty and Western political philosophy, for academic and political leaders in Czech Republic, Slovakia, and Poland.

== Awards ==
For Sandoz's political science and related educational activities in 1994 he was awarded the

- University Medal and Rector's Certificate by Palacký University of Olomouc, Czech Republic;
- Palacký University of Olomouc in 1995 awarded Sandoz the degree Philosophiae doctorem, Honoris causa.
- First political scientist to be chosen Louisiana State University's Distinguished Research Master and awarded the university's Gold Medal; and "in recognition of high attainments in liberal scholarship,"
- In 1996 was the first alumnus member of LSU's Phi Beta Kappa chapter.
- In November 2002 Sandoz delivered the commencement address and was awarded an honorary degree of Doctor en Ciencias Políticas by the University Francisco Marroquín in Guatemala.

== Lectures ==
Sandoz presented a series of lectures on the thought of Voegelin, ethics, and constitutionalism sponsored by the Graduate Program of Ethics of the University of Oslo and the Research Council of Norway in Trondheim in October 1995. He lectured widely in the U. S. and Canada on the contemporary crisis of civic consciousness, foundations of constitutionalism, and modern political philosophy. He delivered the John Witherspoon Lecture titled "Republicanism and Religion: A Conspiracy of Faith and Reason" (Washington, D.C., April 2004); addressed University of Genoa conference on EU constitution-formation (May 2004).

== Works ==
- Political sermons of the American founding era, 1730-1805 - Volumes 1 and 2 (1998)
- The Politics of Truth and other Untimely Essays: The Crisis of Civic Consciousness (U. Mo. Press, 1999);
- A Government of Laws: Political Theory, Religion and the American Founding (LSU, pb. 1991; 2nd ed., U. Mo. Press, 2001); Political Sermons of the American Founding Era, 1730 to 1805 (Liberty Press, 1991; 2d ed., 2 vols., 1998)
- Eric Voegelin's Significance for the Modern Mind (LSU, 1991); Published Essays, 1966–1985, vol. 12,
- The Collected Works of Eric Voegelin (LSU, 1991); Published Essays, 1953–1965, ibid. (CW, vol. 11 [2000]); Published Essays, 1940–1952, ibid. (CW, vol. 10 [2000])
- Republicanism, Religion and the Soul of America; and Vol. 34 of Collected Works, Autobiographical Reflections (rev'd edn), Glossary of Terms, Cumulative Index, ed. with introductions by Sandoz (both U. Mo. Press, 2006).
- The Roots of Liberty: Magna Carta, Ancient Constitution, and the Anglo-American Tradition of Rule of Law (Missouri, 1993; 2d ed. Liberty Fund, 2008)
- Political Apocalypse: A Study of Dostoevsky's Grand Inquisitor, 2d ed. rev. (Wilmington, Del.: ISI Books);
- The Voegelinian Revolution: A Biographical Introduction, 2d ed. rev. (New Brunswick, N. J.: Transaction Pubs., Rutgers University);
- Sandoz wrote the introduction to the 2004 a revised edition of Eric Voegelin, Science, Politics and Gnosticism, ed. ( ISI Books).

=== Editorial work ===
Sandoz was a member of the Editorial Board and serves as General Editor of The Collected Works of Eric Voegelin (LSU, 1989–1999; University of Missouri Press, 1999–2008) 34 vols., and series editor for CW, vols. 19–26, History of Political Ideas.

== See also ==
- American philosophy
- List of American philosophers
