= Jean-Michel Oughourlian =

French neuropsychiatrist

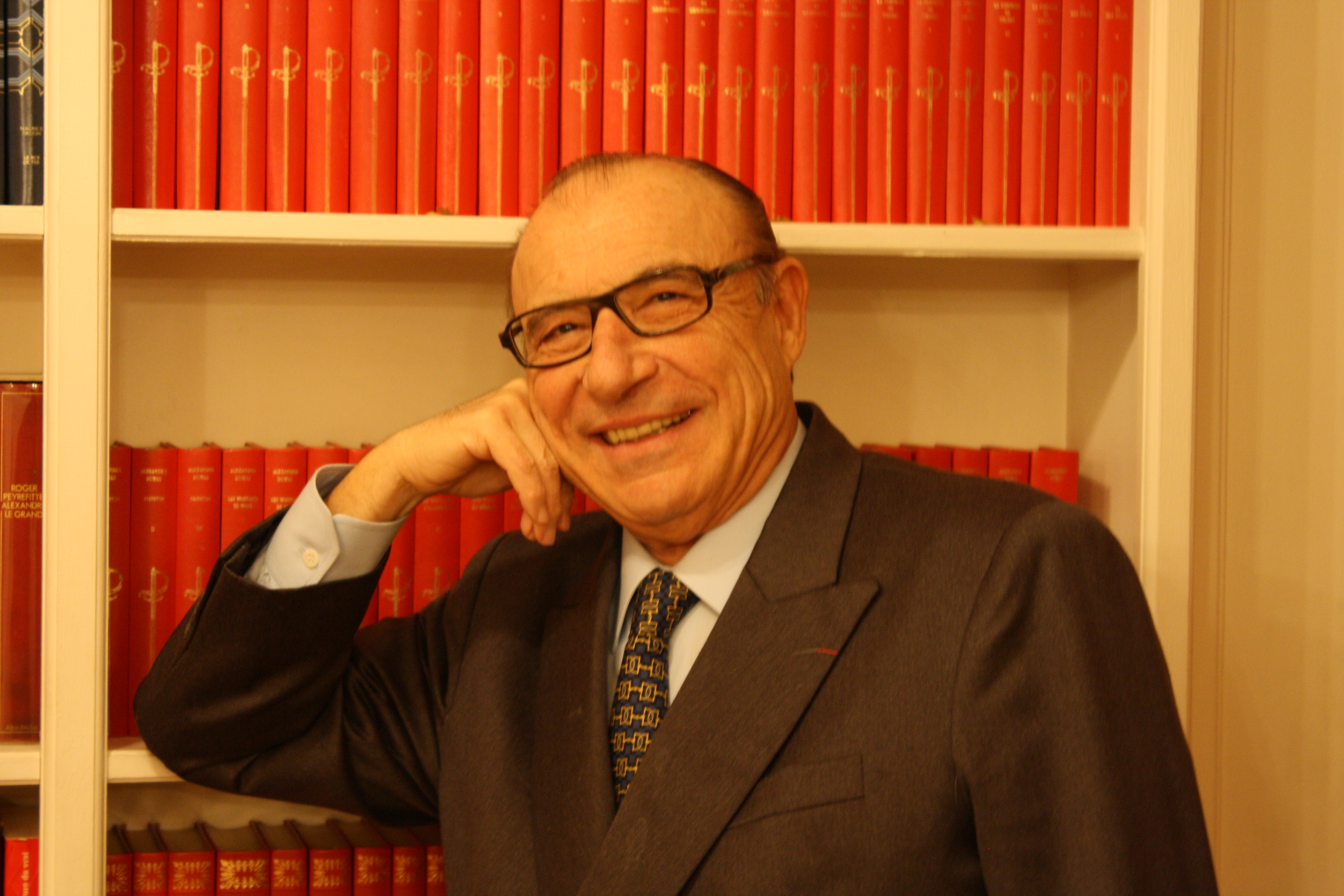
- Oughourlian in 2011
- Born: 20 August 1940 (age 86); Beirut, French Lebanon
- Scientific career
- Fields: Neurology; Psychiatry; Psychology; Psychotherapy
- Workplaces: American Hospital of Paris

Jean-Michel Oughourlian (born 20 August 1940) is an Armenian-French neuropsychiatrist and psychologist as well as a writer and philosopher recognized both in France and the United States for his collaboration with René Girard and his work on the mimetic theory of desire. Since the early 1970s he has devoted both his clinical work and his research to applying and developing Girard's theories in the fields of psychiatry, psychology, and psychopathology. He is the author of several books (see below), in which he developed clinical points of view around mimetic theory of desire.

He is currently the President of the Association of Doctors of the American Hospital of Paris, as well as an honorary member of the Association Recherches Mimétiques, whose goal is to structure research linked to René Girard's mimetic theory and to make the theory more widely known in French-speaking countries.

Jean-Michel Oughourlian is Ambassador of the Sovereign Military Order of Malta to Armenia. He is involved in the fight against poverty, exclusion, and sickness through the defense of the physical, psychological, and spiritual integrity of individuals.

== Life and career ==
Jean-Michel Oughourlian was born on 20 August 1940 in Beirut, Lebanon, to an Armenian father who fled the Armenian genocide of 1915–1922 during WWI and a Colombian mother. He arrived in France at the age of ten.

His university studies covered multiple disciplines:

- Doctor of Medicine in June 1966
- Doctorate in Psychology from the University Paris-Descartes in June 1973.
- Bachelor's Degree in Philosophy from the Sorbonne in June 1975
- Doctorate in Letters and Human Sciences in April 1981
- University Professor in March 1993

Jean-Michel Oughourlian's teaching activities include:

- Psychology, Assistant in the Laboratory of Pathological Psychology at the Sorbonne from 1970 to 1974, then Head Assistant between 1975 and 1985, then Lecturer in Clinical Psychopathology at the Institute of Psychology at the University of Paris V between 1985 and 1993.
- Psychiatry, Certified Lecturer on Psychiatry, Hospital Psychiatrist in December 1972, Honorary Professor of Clinical Psychiatry at the International College of Medicine and Surgery, which includes the American Hospital of Paris, Columbia University and Cornell University, since 1998.
- Psychopolitics, Adjunct Professor of Political Science at the University of Southern California (USC) from 1975 to 1977 and Professor at Stanford in collaboration with René Girard since 1981.

His clinical career unfolded over the following stages:

- Intern at Johns Hopkins Hospital from 1966 to 1967
- Resident Doctor of the Psychiatric Hospitals of Paris from 1968 to 1970.
- Specialist of Electroencephalography in the Service of Functional Explorations of the Nervous System at the Sainte-Anne Hospital Center from 1970 to 1990.
- Attaché of the Hospitals of Paris from 1971 to 1975
- Psychiatrist in the Service of General Surgery of the Sainte-Anne Hospital Center from 1972 to 1992.
- Head of Psychiatry at the American Hospital of Paris from 1981 to 2007.
- Neuro-psychiatrist of the American Hospital of Paris since 1974.

His work as a writer and philosopher includes:

- His first book, "La personne du toxicomane", published in 1974, was one of the first books published in France on drug addiction. He adopted the anthropology of mimetic desire developed by René Girard and used it to enrich his own work in psychiatry. In 1978 he co-authored Things Hidden since the Foundation of the World with René Girard.
- In 1982, he wrote "Un mime nommé désir" (The Puppet of Desire), a book on the phenomena of trances, hysteria, and possession that broke with the Freudian currents of the time and created a new psychology based on mimetic desire as the motor of relationships and the foundation of the self.
- From 2000 to 2006, he was particularly involved in studying manic-depression and bi-polarity and in encouraging people with these illnesses to seek treatment.
- In 2007, he published "Genèse du désir" (The Genesis of Desire), which relates the psychotheraputic methods employed by the author for helping couples during his three decades at the American Hospital of Paris as head of psychiatry.
- In 2010, he published "Psychopolitique", which analyzes current affairs from the perspective of Girardian theory and suggests a way out of the postmodern crisis by sketching the portrait of the leader of tomorrow.

== Oughourlian's thought ==
Very early on, Jean-Michel Oughourlian's clinical research led him to become interested in the work of Milton Erickson, Jay Haley, and Ernest Rossi, and the Phoenix Group, as well as in the work of Paul Watzlawick and the Palo Alto School. He then became interested in the anthropology of mimetic desire developed by René Girard and used it to enrich his own work in psychiatry. In all of these disciplines he has sought to track down the motivations of human behavior and the mechanisms of which men and women are unwittingly the plaything. His contribution to psychological and psychiatric theory consists in questioning the Freudian primacy of the unconscious and affirming that "the unconscious is the other", that is to say, the concrete other person, whose desire serves as a model for our desires, making us into conscious apprentices or blinded marionettes.

In The Puppet of Desire, he explains the story of the Loudon possessions, which he deciphers with the help of the mimetic theory, showing that at bottom it is the mother superior of the convent, infatuated with a young prelate, who draws the other sisters along with her by transmitting her Madame Bovary-like desire to them, plunging all of them into a generalized hysteria. Neuroses and even psychoses are interpreted as being so many strategies of the self for hiding the truth about the reality of desire, whose fundamental alterity people refuse to recognize.

"The clinical manifestation of mimetic desire is rivalry", says Oughourlian. Insofar as imitation is, of all human weaknesses, the one that people have the most trouble admitting, it never presents itself as such. The patient accuses his model of wanting to steal his job, wife, or identity, betraying against the grain the surreptitious alterity that moves through him. Pulling oneself out of the rivalrous impasse implies becoming fully conscious of one's proper dependency and admitting one's debt toward the other's desire. This is a difficult undertaking, which requires on the psychotherapist's part an acute understanding of psychology and psychopolitics and on the patient's part the gradual overcoming of his pride.

Appreciated in the United States by psychologists and psychiatrists of the ¨relational¨ school, Jean-Michel Oughourlian has participated actively since it was founded in the Colloquium on Violence and Religion (COVR), an association of researchers who are interested in René Girard's mimetic theory of founding violence and the scapegoat mechanism. He also has ties with the Association Recherches Mimétiques (ARM), for which he has led seminars. He participated in a work group organized by Dr. Scott Garrels of the Fuller School of Psychology (Pasadena, California) on imitation and the most recent discoveries in developmental psychology and neuroscience (mirror neurons). The group, which included Vittorio Gallese and Andre Meltzoff, met at Stanford University and in Paris at the Ecole Normale Supérieure (ENS) Paris rue d´Ulm.

== Bibliography ==
This section only lists book-length publications that Jean-Michel Oughourlian wrote or edited.

- 1978. Des choses cachées depuis la fondation du monde. Paris: Grasset. ISBN 2-246-61841-X. (English translation: Things Hidden since the Foundation of the World: Research undertaken in collaboration with René Girard and G. Lefort. Stanford: Stanford University Press, 1987)
- 1991. The Puppet of Desire, The Psychology of Hysteria, Possession and Hypnosis, Translated with an introduction by Eugene Webb. Stanford University Press, 1 vol., 263 pages.
- 2007. The Genesis of Desire, trans. Eugene Webb, Michigan State University Press.
- 2010. Psychopolitique, with René Girard and Trevor Cribben Merrill, Paris, Ed. Francois Xavier de Guibert.
- 2012. Votre cerveau n'a pas fini de vous étonner, Paris, Ed. Albin Michel, Collection Entretiens / Clés, ISBN 978-2-226-24074-3 (English translation:Your brain does not stop amazing you)

== Honours and awards ==
- Ambassador of the Sovereign Military Order of Malta to Armenia.

== See also ==
- French philosophy
- List of French philosophers
