= Expression Theory of Art =

The Expression Theory of Art is a philosophical theory originally dating back to Romanticism and eventually popularized by Leo Tolstoy in his book What is Art?, which states that works can only be called art if there is the discharge of personal feeling into it by the creator, whether it being done to transmit, explain, or state said feeling.

Starry Night by Vincent Van Gogh (1889) didn't try to fit into what the masses believed was true art, rather the artist simply wanted to share a bit of his inner self

This theory strongly opposes the older Mimetic Theory of Art (not to be confused with René Girard's Mimetic Theory of Desire). Proposed by classical figures like Plato and Aristotle, this theory states that art derives from copying and imitating what is physical to the artist (i.e. a building) with no inherent presence of emotions.
