= James Alison =

English Catholic priest and theologian (born 1959)

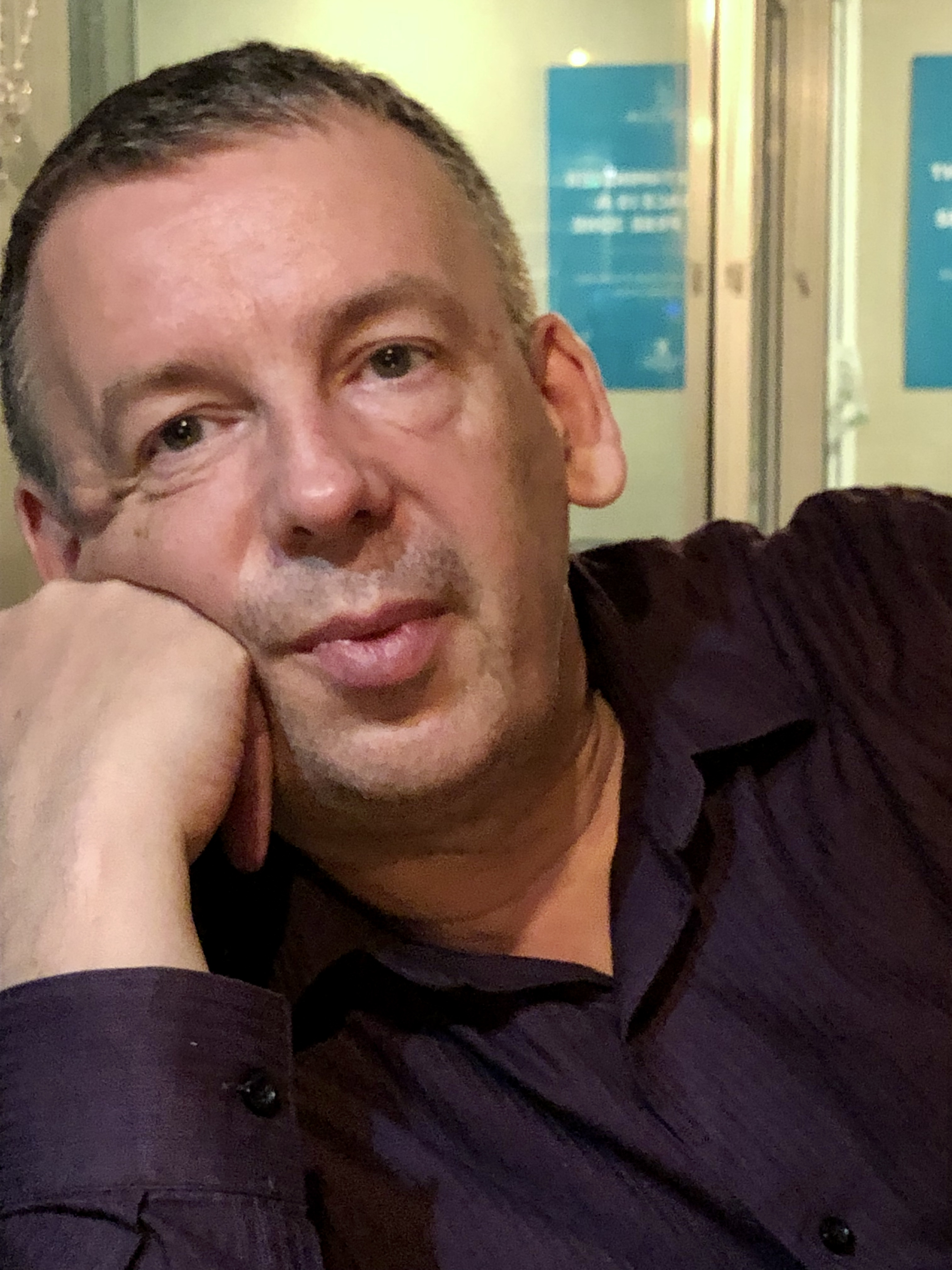
- Alison in 2019
- Born: 4 October 1959 (age 67); London, England
- Education: Jesuit School of Philosophy and Theology
- Occupations: Priest; theologian
- Known for: Exploring René Girard's anthropological insights in Christian theology
- Parents: Michael Alison; Sylvia Mary Alison

Ecclesiastical career
- Religion: Christianity (Roman Catholic)
- Church: Latin Church
- Ordained: 1988 (priest)
- Title: Fr, Dr
- Website: jamesalison.com

James Alison (born 4 October 1959) is an English Catholic priest and theologian. Alison is noted for his application of René Girard's anthropological theory to Christian systematic theology and for his work on LGBT issues.

== Life and work ==
=== Early years and family ===
James Alison was born on 4 October 1959 in London. He has a brother and a sister, director Rosie Alison.

His father, Michael Alison, was a prominent Conservative Member of Parliament and minister in Margaret Thatcher's government. He was an Evangelical Christian, a John Stott's convert. His mother, Sylvia Mary Alison (née Haigh), embraced Evangelical Christianity under the influence of Billy Graham's missionary work. Alison described his parents as "part of that generation that sought to redefine Christianity as being a hardline, moralistic and conservative political social movement".

Alison went to Eton College, a prestigious boarding school.

=== Conversion to Catholicism and education ===
Alison left the Church of England at the age of eighteen to join the Roman Catholic Church.

He studied Spanish and History at New College of the University of Oxford. After the second year of his bachelor's degree, he went to Mexico on student exchange, at the end of which joined the Mexican Dominicans in 1981. There, he completed a postulancy and started the novitiate with Raul Vera as his novice master.

"For cultural and temperamental differences", he left Mexico in 1983 to complete novitiate in England, at Blackfriars, Oxford. There, his novice master was Herbert McCabe, in Alison's opinion, "probably the most significant Thomistic thinker in the English language in the 20th century" and "a wonderful teacher, and something of a father figure to me".

=== Pastoral ministry and ordination ===
In 1986, Alison took part in a conference organised by the English Dominicans to propose Catholic pastoral involvement with AIDS. This led to his first publication, a CTS pamphlet, Catholic and AIDS: Questions and Answers.

In 1987, Alison went to continue his studies at the Jesuit theology faculty in Belo Horizonte, Brazil. He was ordained in 1988. While working on his theology degree between 1987 and 1990, he ministered to people with AIDS who – in Alison's words – "it would be more accurate to say were dying with AIDS than living, because this was before any of the cocktails [...] 80% died within five months of first symptom, so a lot of what I was doing was giving people last rites and burial."

=== René Girard and early works ===
In 1985, Alison came across René Girard's book, Things Hidden since the Foundation of the World. This encounter with the French thinker has produced a seismic and lasting impact. Starting from Alison's first monograph, Knowing Jesus (1993), this influence has been made explicit. In this book, he introduced the idea of "the intelligence of the victim" to explain the change taking place in Jesus' disciples after meeting the risen Christ.

From 1990 to 1994, Alison worked on his doctoral thesis about original sin at the Jesuit theology faculty in Belo Horizonte. He defended it successfully in November 1994. At Easter 1995, he left the Dominicans realising he was a "guest, not a member" there.

In 1997, Alison produced a monograph, Living in the End Times (also published as Raising Abel), which was an adaptation and translation of the course on Eschatology delivered at the Instituto Pedro de Cordoba, Chile, in 1994. In 1998, the English-language version of his doctorate was published under the title The Joy of Being Wrong.

=== Author, preacher, lecturer and retreat giver ===
Since 1995 onwards, Alison remained a priest, though not incardinated in any diocese. In the following six years, he moved countries seven times living in Latin America, the United States and the UK.

In 2001, the Faith Beyond Resentment: Fragments Catholic and Gay was published. It was the first book in which Alison attempted to set Catholic theology and Girardian insights into the context of the experience of a gay man and the wider LGBTQ+ community. He admits this task was not an easy one: “There is nothing elegant about inhabiting a space which has historically, socially and theologically been regarded at best as risible and at worst as evil”.

In the following years, three more collections of essays and talks appeared: On Being Liked (2004), Undergoing God (2006) and Broken Hearts and New Creations (2010) - written broadly from the same perspective as the Faith Beyond Resentment.

Since 2008, Alison has been awarded a fellowship at Imitatio, the organisation set up by the Thiel Foundation for researching and promoting René Girard's thought. For a while, he lived in São Paulo, Brazil.

In 2013, he produced the Jesus the Forgiving Victim, a multimedia course of induction into the Christian faith for adults which follows on from the insight into desire associated with René Girard.

In 2020, Alison started Praying Eucharistically, a project exploring the ways of worshipping and Christian living in the COVID lockdown. For this project, he provides the appropriate liturgical texts for people celebrating at home, and offers Gospel readings and homilies in video format for Sundays and main festivities of the liturgical year.

Currently he works as a travelling preacher, lecturer and retreat giver, based in Madrid, Spain.

=== Clerical status ===
Alison was a member of the Dominican order – from 1981 to 1995. In 1996, he wrote to the Congregation for the Doctrine of the Faith telling them that he believed his vows to be null as they been taken while under a conscience based on the "false premise of gay people being objectively disordered and thus celibacy being obligatory". He offered to let them issue a decree saying that his ordination was null, but they declined, saying it was valid. Instead, the congregation asked him to seek laicisation, but Alison declined: "The form for doing that also required that lies be told, so, on the advice of a canon lawyer, I did nothing and heard nothing."

More than 10 years later, a superior in the Dominican order asked if Alison would object to his processing paperwork dismissing Alison from the order. Alison said he had no objection to the outcome of the process, but would not participate actively as he believed he was never truly a member anyway. He eventually received a letter stating that he was a priest in good standing, not currently incardinated but available to be incardinated if a bishop wished to have him.

While living in Brazil, the local bishop asked for Alison's consent to be laicised. Alison declined, but instead offered to be incardinated into the diocese. The bishop declined that offer. The bishop then began a process of laicization without Alison's consent using a recent (2009) change in canon law; Alison was not informed of any charges, and believed this use of canon law was not applicable to his situation. A year later, a letter from the Congregation for the Clergy arrived announcing that Alison had been dismissed from clerical status, forbidding him from teaching, preaching, or presiding. According to the letter, this decision was unappealable. For Alison, "it was shocking to be tangential to a process in which it is unnecessary to inform the one charged of the charges against him, in which no legal representation is permitted, and whose sentence does not require the signature of the sentencee".

A friendly bishop, who was once Alison's novice master, hand delivered a letter to Pope Francis in May 2017 concerning his situation. In the letter, Alison asked the Pope to make his situation regular; he proposed to treat the congregation's letter "as null, and to carry on as before". On 2 July 2017, Pope Francis called Alison directly. According to Alison, Pope Francis told him, "I want you to walk with deep interior freedom, following the Spirit of Jesus. And I give you the power of the keys." Alison understood from this that Pope Francis did not perceive the congregation's decision as binding; that he treated him as a priest giving him universal jurisdiction to hear confessions and preach, the two faculties traditionally associated with the power of the keys. Alison noted that this was how Pope Francis had acted towards those he appointed as missionaries during the 2016 Jubilee of Mercy. Pope Francis has never made a written statement to confirm his call and its content. However he did confirm it orally the following year in an audience with Bishop Raúl Vera, O.P., (now Emeritus of Saltillo, Mexico). It is not clear to Alison himself, or to anybody else, where this leaves him canonically. However, that the Pope, as the source of the authority on which the Congregation for the Clergy relied in its letter, is able to perform an immediate act of the Universal Ordinary giving a priest such jurisdiction irrespective of any decision by the Congregation, is not in doubt.

== Theology ==
=== Girardian influence ===
To a very large extent, Alison's theology rests on the anthropological – psychological and sociological – insights of René Girard's understanding of mimetic desire, scapegoating, and conversion. He explained this influence as follows:

"What has excited me ever since I came across René Girard's thought has been the fecundity for theology of Girard's mimetic insight concerning desire and violence. Thanks to Girard's insight into the scapegoat mechanism at work throughout human culture it has become possible to make sense of Jesus’ death as being salvific for us in a way that is entirely orthodox and takes us away from imputing any vengeance or retribution to God. Girard has also opened up for me a very rich hermeneutic for Scripture, one that avoids the temptations to Marcionism on the one hand and Fundamentalism on the other."

He reflected on Girard's influence on his own thought on numerous occasions.

=== Theological method ===
Alison's theological method has been described as inductive: for him, theological reflection is among those actions and practices that induct the person into a new form of belonging. For Alison, conversion to Christ and one's engagement in theological reflection have a reciprocal relationship. In his view, authentic Christian theology, to which Alison refers to as "theology in the order of discovery", comes from an experience of encountering Christ. Conversion for Alison refers both to the transformative encounter – "a completely unexpected and extraordinary access to Christ" – and to the subsequent ongoing process by which that access to Christ develops into a new and evolving understanding of self, God, humanity, and the whole of creation. However, it is God who is the true subject acting on, for, and toward us, thinking believers invited to participate in God's ongoing creation.

=== "Intelligence of the victim" ===
"The intelligence of the victim" is one of the key terms of Alison's theology. He explains it as "the inner dynamic of the whole life and death of Jesus and what had formed his relationships with his Father". Jesus' mind was formed not by rivalry and the need for victory over others, but by the complete trust in the vivaciousness of God enabling him to live his life in self-giving. The Gospels where "the only relationship that matters in the judgement is that with the victim" are the written witnesses of the disciples getting to understand Jesus' mind as they – following Jesus' death and resurrection – were looking back with the transformed ability to see. Thus, the intelligence of the victim enables two shifts: revealing humans as formed by rivalistic victimisation and violence; and demystifying God who is entirely without violence. Intelligence in Alison's usage is "operative" as its use is determined by its source – either the vivaciousness of God or the satanic lie that violence is necessary for survival and peace. Such intelligence shapes one's foundational understanding in the world and their experienced identity.

=== Conversion as "subversion from within" ===
To explain the change of the mind of the person experiencing conversion enabled by the reception of forgiveness, Alison uses a phrase "subversion from within" – a gradual transformation by the clearer perspective operating in the mind of Christ. Such was the disciples’ experience initiated by their encounters with the crucified and risen Christ as a forgiving victim, in the process of which their intelligence shaped by the lie of death was dismantled and nurtured back by "the intelligence of the victim". From being addicts to human violence and victimisation like all of us they were transformed into imitators of Jesus’ peaceful acceptance of an identity from the Father. As this intelligence shapes persons' authentic selves capable of freely choosing to imitate Jesus’ imitation of his Father, they become able to perceive themselves correctly, remember the past clearly and imagine God and the future vivaciously. In Alison's words, "it is not what we see, but our capacity for gaze itself that is undergoing transformation".

=== Meeting Christ as forgiveness ===
Neither the number nor severity of one's sins, nor acknowledging the correct doctrines enables one's painful and uncharted process of conversion. It is the experience of receiving forgiveness that made the disciples forgiven forgivers and imitators of Christ.

=== God's non-involvement in death, violence and exclusion ===
Alison uses the language of divine "utter vivacity" and "ineffable effervescence" to stress that there is no death in God, and God is not involved in the death of humans nor judgement leading to death. The understanding of God as love is incompatible with the idea of God's involvement in violence, separation, anger, or exclusion. Jesus enacted God's love toward humans and all creation by undergoing death both as the end of life and as an extreme form of exclusion and victimisation.

As Jesus embodied the identity and mind received from the Father, he did not have to submit to the human temptation to live out of a fear of death. Yet our "darkened, senseless, and futile minds and imaginations" struggle to comprehend that "his full human imagination was capable of being fixed on the ineffable effervescence and vivacity, power and deathlessness of God" The fear of death leads humans to maintaining group peace and solidarity by excluding odd or inconvenient "others" on the false assumption that their death is the basic means for achieving peace and cohesion. The revelation unfolding in the Scriptures challenges such a common belief that God wants to punish evildoers, and this punishment takes the form of human exclusion and violence.

"For God there are no "outsiders", which means that any mechanism for the creation of "outsiders" is automatically and simply a mechanism of human violence, and that's that."

=== Undergoing atonement ===
Alison's reflection on atonement is rooted in the Jewish liturgical tradition going right back to the time of the First Temple. There, after sacrificing an animal representing the Lord, the high priest acting in the person of Yahweh would come through the Veil – meaning the Creator entering into the created world. He sprinkled the temple with the blood of the Lord, thus setting the world and people free from their impurities and sins and transgression. In the ancient Jewish liturgical tradition of atonement, God takes the initiative of breaking through towards the creation to restore it, out of love for the people. This liturgy of atonement conveys the exact reversal of the common – pagan – understanding of a priestly sacrifice: a priest satisfying divine anger on behalf of the people.

The only angry divinity around is the human race. We are bound up with each other in death, vengeance, violence and dwelling in wrath. When Jesus went to the cross he put himself in the place of what the ancient liturgical rite was both remembering and covering up: human sacrifice. In his death and resurrection, Jesus brought the sacrificial system to an end by enabling us to start imagining life without sacrifice.

Alison contrasts "getting right" the theory of atonement with "undergoing atonement":

if you have a theory of atonement – something grasped – you have something that people can "get right," and then be on the inside of the good guys. "We're the people who are covered by the blood; we’re the ones who are okay, the ones who are good; and then there are those others who aren't." […] But the whole purpose of the Christian understanding is that we shouldn’t identify too soon with the good guys. On the contrary, we are people who are constantly undergoing "I AM" – that is to say, God – coming towards us one who is offering forgiveness as our victim. […] we are the “other” who are being turned into a "we", in the degree to which we find our similarity with our brother and sister on either side of us. […] If you are undergoing atonement it means that you are constantly in the process of being approached by someone who is forgiving you.

=== Theology of and for the LGBTQ+ people ===
Alison believes that the Catholic Church's teaching about homosexuality so far has been anomalous as it rests on a fundamentally flawed premise of the presumed intrinsic heterosexuality of all humans (in other words, homosexuals simply being defective heterosexuals). Thus homosexuality is conceived as an objectively disordered tendency leading to intrinsically evil acts. Alison believes rather that "being gay is a regularly occurring nonpathological minority variant in the human condition", which is better compared to left-handedness – a condition which also used to be regarded defective until the veil of mythological thinking about it has been removed by listening to science – than to an undisputedly disordered condition like anorexia.

Alison comments extensively on the Church's pronouncements about homosexuality and same-sex relationships emphasising their developing nature and the specific contexts, and calling for LGBTQ+ Catholics not to be scandalised by the hierarchy's harsh tone and inconsistent arguments. Instead of being upset by, or fascinated with, never-ending rows and fightings he encourages LGBTQ+ people to engage with a wholesome life of practicing faith, reaching out to the poor, the sick, the imprisoned, and the dispossessed: gay people have been invited to the banquet of the Forgiving Victim in the same manner as their heterosexual brothers and sisters. He challenges LGBTQ+ Catholics to become witnesses of mercy to those who have abandoned faith and the believing community due to mistaking the temporary ecclesiastical constructs for sacred pillars of the faith.

== Books ==
=== English ===
- Alison, James (2013). Jesus the Forgiving Victim: listening for the unheard voice: an introduction to Christianity for adults. Doers. ISBN 9780981812311.
- Broken hearts and new creations: intimations of a great reversal. London: Darton, Longman and Todd. 2010. ISBN 978-0-232-52796-4.
- Undergoing God: dispatches from the scene of a break-In. London: Darton, Longman and Todd. 2006. ISBN 0232526761.
- On being liked. London: Darton, Longman and Todd. 2004. ISBN 023252517X.
- Faith beyond resentment: fragments Catholic and gay. London: Darton, Longman and Todd. 2001. ISBN 0-232-52411-4.
- Raising Abel: the recovery of the eschatological Imagination. New York: Crossroad. 1996. ISBN 9780824515652. Also published under the title Living in the End Times: The Last Things Re-imagined ISBN 84-254-2097-0
- Alison, James (1998). The joy of being wrong: original sin through Easter eyes. New York. ISBN 9780824516765.
- Knowing Jesus. London: SPCK. 1993. ISBN 0-281-05222-0.
- Catholics and AIDS : questions and answers. London: Catholic Truth Society. 1987. ISBN 0-85183-704-2. OCLC 17597095.

=== Dutch ===
- Kennis van Jezus [Knowing Jesus]. Baarn: Ten Have. 1994. ISBN 9025945651.

=== French ===
- La foi au-delà du ressentiment: Fragments catholiques et gays [Faith beyond resentment: fragments Catholic and gay] (in French). Paris: Cerf. 2021. ISBN 9782204143806.
- Connaître Jésus [Knowing Jesus]. Artège. 2019. ISBN 9791033608240.
- 12 leçons sur le christianisme [Jesus the Forgiving Victim]. Decitre. 2015. ISBN 9782220066417.
- Le péché originel à la lumière de la Résurrection - "Bienheureuse faute d'Adam..." [The joy of being wrong: original sin through Easter eyes]. Paris: Cerf. 2009. ISBN 9782204091084.

=== Italian ===
- Fede oltre il risentimento. Coscienza cattolica e coscienza gay: risorse per il dibattito [Faith beyond resentment: fragments Catholic and gay]. Massa: Transeuropa Edizioni. 2007. ISBN 978-8875800192.
- Redenzione e testimonianza gay: per una rilettura girardiana della Bibbia e della violenza [Redemption and gay witness: a Girardian re-reading of the Bible and violence]. Massa: Transeuropa Edizioni. 2014. ISBN 978-8898716203.

=== Portuguese ===
- O Pecado Original à Luz da Ressurreição - A Alegria de descobrir-se equivocado [The joy of being wrong: original sin through Easter eyes]. São Paulo: É Realizações. 2011. ISBN 978-85-8033-048-9.
- Fé Além do Ressentimento: Fragmentos Católicos em Voz Gay [Faith beyond resentment: fragments Catholic and gay]. São Paulo: É Realizações. 2010.

=== Russian ===
- Вера над обидами и возмущением: фрагменты о христианстве и гомосексуализме [Faith beyond resentment: fragments Catholic and gay]. Москва: Издательство ББИ. 2013. ISBN 978-5-89647-303-9. Archived from the original on 25 June 2021.
- Жизнь в последние времена. Иной взгляд на эсхатологию [Living in the End Times: the Last Things re-imagined]. Москва: Издательство ББИ. 2013. ISBN 978-5-89647-211-7.
- Постижение Иисуса. Доступное введение в христологию [Knowing Jesus: an accessible introduction to Christology]. Москва: Издательство ББИ. 2016. ISBN 978-5-89647-229-2.

=== Spanish ===
- Para la libertad nos ha liberado. Acercamientos para desatar los nudos de la expiación y de la conciencia gay [For freedom he has freed us. On untying the knots of atonement and gay conscience]. Guadalajara: ITESO. 2017. ISBN 978-607-8528-22-6.
- Una fe más allá del resentimiento: fragmentos católicos en clave gay [Faith beyond resentment: fragments Catholic and gay]. Barcelona: Herder Editorial. 2003. ISBN 978-8425422737.
- El Retorno de Abel [Raising Abel: The Recovery of the Eschatological Imagination]. Barcelona: Herder Editorial. 1999. ISBN 978-8425420979.
- Conocer a Jesús: Cristología de la no-violencia [Knowing Jesus]. Koinonia. Salamanca: Secretariado Trinitario. 1994. ISBN 978-8488643117.

=== About James Alison ===
- Edwards, John P. (2020). James Alison and a Girardian theology: conversion, theological reflection, and induction (Paperback, hardback, ebook). London: Bloomsbury. ISBN 978-0567699015.

== See also ==
Pope Francis and homosexuality
