= Generative anthropology =

Field of study

Generative anthropology is a field of study based on the hypothesis that the origin of human language happened in a singular event. The discipline of Generative Anthropology centers upon this original event which Eric Gans calls The Originary Scene. This scene is a kind of origin story that hypothesizes the specific event where language originated. The Originary Scene is powerful because any human ability: our ability to do science, to be ironic, to love, to think, to dominate, etc can be carefully explained first by reference to this scene of origin.

Because the Originary Scene was the origin of all things human; Generative Anthropology attempts to understand all cultural phenomena in the simplest terms possible: all things human can be traced back to this hypothetical single origin point.

== Origin ==
Generative anthropology originated with Professor Eric Gans of UCLA who developed his ideas in a series of books and articles beginning with The Origin of Language: A Formal Theory of Representation (1981), which builds on the ideas of René Girard, notably that of mimetic desire. In establishing the theory of Generative Anthropology, Gans departs from and goes beyond Girard's work in many ways. Generative Anthropology is therefore an independent and original way of understanding the human species, its origin, culture, history, and development.

=== Anthropoetics ===
Gans founded (and edits) the web-based journal Anthropoetics: The Journal of Generative Anthropology as a scholarly forum for research into human culture and origins based on his theories of Generative Anthropology and the closely related theories of fundamental anthropology developed by René Girard. In his online Chronicles of Love and Resentment Gans applies the principles of Generative Anthropology to a wide variety of fields including popular culture, film, post-modernism, economics, contemporary politics, the Holocaust, philosophy, religion, and paleo-anthropology.

== Originary hypothesis of human language ==
The central hypothesis of generative anthropology is that the origin of language was a singular event. Human language is radically different from animal communication systems. It possesses syntax, allowing for unlimited new combinations and content; it is symbolic, and it possesses a capacity for history. Thus it is hypothesized that the origin of language must have been a singular event, and the principle of parsimony requires that it originated only once.

Language makes possible new forms of social organization radically different from animal "pecking order" hierarchies dominated by an alpha male. Thus, the development of language allowed for a new stage in human evolution – the beginning of culture, including religion, art, desire, and the sacred. As language provides memory and history via a record of its own history, language itself can be defined via a hypothesis of its origin based on our knowledge of human culture. As with any scientific hypothesis, its value is in its ability to account for the known facts of human history and culture.

=== Mimetic behaviour ===
Mimetic (imitatory) behaviour connects proto-hominid species with humans. Imitation is an adaptive learning behavior, a form of intelligence favored by natural selection. Imitation, as René Girard observes, leads to conflict when two individuals imitate each other in their attempt to appropriate a desired object. The problem is to explain the transition from one form of mimesis, imitation, to another, representation. Although many anthropologists have hypothesized that language evolved to help humans describe their world, this ignores the fact that intra-species violence, not the environment, poses the greatest threat to human existence. Human representation, according to Gans, is not merely a "natural" evolutionary development of animal communication systems, but is a radical departure from it. The signifier implies a symbolic dimension that is not reducible to empirical referents.

=== Originary event ===
At the event of the origin of language, there was a proto-human hominid species which had gradually become more mimetic, presumably in response to environmental pressures including climate changes and competition for limited resources. Higher primates have dominance hierarchies which serve to limit and prevent destructive conflict within the social group. As individuals within the proto-human group became more mimetic, the dominance system broke down and became inadequate to control the threat of violence posed by conflictual mimesis.

Gans posits an "originary event" along the following lines: A group of hominids have surrounded a food object, e.g. the body of a large mammal following a hunt. The attraction of the object exceeds the limits of simple appetite due to the operation of group mimesis, essentially an expression of competition or rivalry. The object becomes more attractive simply because each member of the group finds it attractive: each individual in the group observes the attention that his rivals give the object. Actual appetite is artificially inflated through this mutual reinforcement. The power of appetitive mimesis in conjunction with the threat of violence is such that the central object begins to assume a sacred aura – infinitely desirable and infinitely dangerous.

Mimesis thus gives rise to a pragmatic paradox: the double imperative to take the desired object for personal gain, and to refrain from taking it to avoid conflict. In other words, imitating the rival means not imitating the rival, because imitation leads to conflict, the attempt to destroy rather than imitate (Gans, Signs of Paradox 18). Generative Anthropology theorizes that when this mimetic instinct becomes so powerful that it seems to possess a sacred force endangering the survival of the group, the resultant intra-species pressure favours the emergence of the sign.

No member of the group is able to take the sacred object, and at least one member of the group intends this aborted gesture as a sign designating the central object. This meaning is successfully communicated to the group, who follow suit by reading their aborted gestures as signs also. The sign focuses attention on the sacred power of the central object, which is conceived as the source of its own power. The object which compels attention yet prohibits consumption can only be represented. The basic advantage of the sign over the object is that "The sign is an economical substitute for its inaccessible referent. Things are scarce and consequently objects of potential contention; signs are abundant because they can be reproduced at will" (Gans, Originary Thinking 9). The desire for the object is mediated by the sign, which paradoxically both creates desire, by attributing significance to the object, yet also defers desire, by designating the object as sacred or taboo. The mimetic impulse is sublimated, expressed in a different form, as the act of representation. Individual self-consciousness is also born at this moment, in the recognition of alienation from the sacred center. The primary value/function of the sign in this scenario is ethical, as the deferral of violence, but the sign is also referential. What the sign refers to, strictly speaking, is not the physical object, but rather the mediated object of desire as realized in the imagination of each individual.

The emergence of the sign is only a temporary deferral of violence. It is immediately followed by the sparagmos, the discharge of the mimetic tension created by the sign in the violent dismemberment and consumption of the worldly incarnation of the sign, the central appetitive object. The violence of the sparagmos is mediated by the sign and thus directed towards the central object rather than the other members of the group. By including the sparagmos in the originary hypothesis, Gans intends to incorporate Girard's insights into scapegoating and the sacrificial (see Signs of Paradox 131–151).

The "scene of representation" is fundamentally social or interpersonal. The act of representation always implies the presence of another or others. The use of a sign evokes the communal scene of representation, structured by a sacred center and a human periphery. The significance of the sign seems to emerge from the sacred center (in its resistance to appropriation), but the pragmatic significance of the sign is realized in the peace brokered amongst the humans on the periphery.

All signs point to the sacred, that which is significant to the community. The sacred cannot be signified directly, since it is essentially an imaginary or ideal construction of mimetic desire. The significance is realized in the human relationships as mediated by the sign. When an individual refers to an object or idea, the reference is fundamentally to the significance of that object or idea for the human community. Language attempts to reproduce the non-violent presence of the community to itself, even though it may attempt to do so sacrificially, by designating a scapegoat victim.

Generative Anthropology is so called because human culture is understood as a "genetic" development of the originary event. The scene of representation is a true cultural universal, but it must be analyzed in terms of its dialectical development. The conditions for the generation of significance are subject to historical evolution, so that the formal articulation of the sign always includes a dialogical relationship to past forms.

== Generative Anthropology Society and Conference ==
The Generative Anthropology Society and Conference (GASC) is a scholarly association formed for the purpose of facilitating intellectual exchange amongst those interested in fundamental reflection on the human, originary thinking, and Generative Anthropology, including support for regular conferences. GASC was formally organized on June 24, 2010 at Westminster College, Salt Lake City during the 4th Annual Generative Anthropology Summer Conference.

Since 2007, GASC has held an annual summer conference on generative anthropology.

2007 - Kwantlen University College of University of British Columbia (Vancouver, British Columbia)

2008 - Chapman University (Orange, California)

2009 - University of Ottawa (Ottawa, Ontario)

2010 - Westminster College (Utah) (Salt Lake City) and Brigham Young University (Provo, Utah)

2011 - High Point University (High Point, North Carolina)

2012 - International Christian University (Tokyo, Japan)

2013 - University of California, Los Angeles

2014 - University of Victoria (Greater Victoria, British Columbia), Canada

2015 - High Point University (High Point, North Carolina)

2016 - Kinjo Gakuin University (Nagoya, Japan)

== See also ==
- Memetics
- Post-postmodernism

== Bibliography ==
=== Books by Eric Gans ===
The Origin of Language: A Formal Theory of Representation. University of California Press, 1981.

The End of Culture: Toward a Generative Anthropology. University of California Press, 1985.

Science and Faith: The Anthropology of Revelation. Savage, Md.: Rowman & Littlefield, 1990.

Originary Thinking: Elements of Generative Anthropology. Stanford University Press, 1993.

Signs of Paradox: Irony, Resentment, and Other Mimetic Structures. Stanford University Press, 1997.

The Scenic Imagination: Originary Thinking from Hobbes to the Present Day. Stanford University Press 2007.

A New Way of Thinking: Generative Anthropology in Religion, Philosophy, and Art. Davies Group, 2011

=== Articles by Eric Gans ===
- "The Unique Source of Religion and Morality." Anthropoetics 1, 1 (June 1995): 10 pp. Revised version in Contagion 3 (Spring 1996): 51–65.
- "Mimetic Paradox and the Event of Human Origin." Anthropoetics 1, 2 (December 1995): 15 pp.
- "Plato and the Birth of Conceptual Thought." Anthropoetics 2, 2 (January 1997): 11 pp.
- "Originary Narrative." Anthropoetics 3, 2 (February 1998): 10 pp.
- "The Little Bang: The Early Origin of Language." Anthropoetics 5, 1 (Spring / Summer 1999) : 6 pp. Also in 'Contagion' 7 (Spring 2000): 1–17.
- "The Sacred and the Social: Defining Durkheim's Anthropological Legacy." Anthropoetics 6, 1 (Spring / Summer 2000): 7 pp.
- (with Ammar Abdulhamid) "A Dialogue on the Middle East and Other Subjects." Anthropoetics 7, 2 (Fall 2001 / Winter 2002): 16 pp. Also (in two parts) in Maaber 8 (Fall 2002) and 9 (Fourth Quarter, 2002).
