= Things Hidden Since the Foundation of the World =

1978 book by René Girard

- Author: René Girard
- Original title: Des choses cachées depuis la fondation du monde
- Translators: Stephen Bann, Michael Metteer
- Language: French
- Subject: Anthropology
- Publisher: Éditions Grasset & Fasquelle
- Publication date: 1978
- Publication place: France
- English publication date: 1987
- Media type: Print (hardcover and paperback)
- Pages: 469
- ISBN: 978-0804722155

Things Hidden Since the Foundation of the World (French: Des choses cachées depuis la fondation du monde) is a 1978 book by the French critic René Girard; it presents a dialogue between Girard and the psychiatrists Jean-Michel Oughourlian and Guy Lefort. The book's title is a reference to the New Testament: "This was to fulfill what had been spoken through the prophet: 'I will open my mouth to speak in parables; I will proclaim what has been hidden since the foundation.'" (Matthew 13:35 NRSV)

== Summary ==
Things Hidden Since the Foundation of the World contains a comprehensive overview of Girard's work up to that point, and a reflection on the Judeo-Christian texts.

In Girard's theory, three core mechanisms govern widespread social interactions:

- Mimesis, the process by which individuals copy one another in escalation, leading to conflict
- Scapegoating, a process by which collective guilt is transferred onto victims and then purged
- Violence

Mimetic theory proposes that human behavior is based upon mimesis, and that imitation can engender pointless conflict. Girard notes the productive potential of competition: "It is because of this unprecedented capacity to promote competition within limits that always remain socially, if not individually, acceptable that we have all the amazing achievements of the modern world," but states that competition stifles progress once it becomes an end in itself: "rivals are more apt to forget about whatever objects are the cause of the rivalry and instead become more fascinated with one another."

== Reception ==
The book became a national bestseller in France and was discussed in academic circles. Theorists who held the book in high regard included Michel Serres, Paul Ricoeur, Philippe Sollers, Gianni Vattimo, and Charles Taylor.
