= Joseph Girard (historian) =

French historian and librarian (1881–1962)

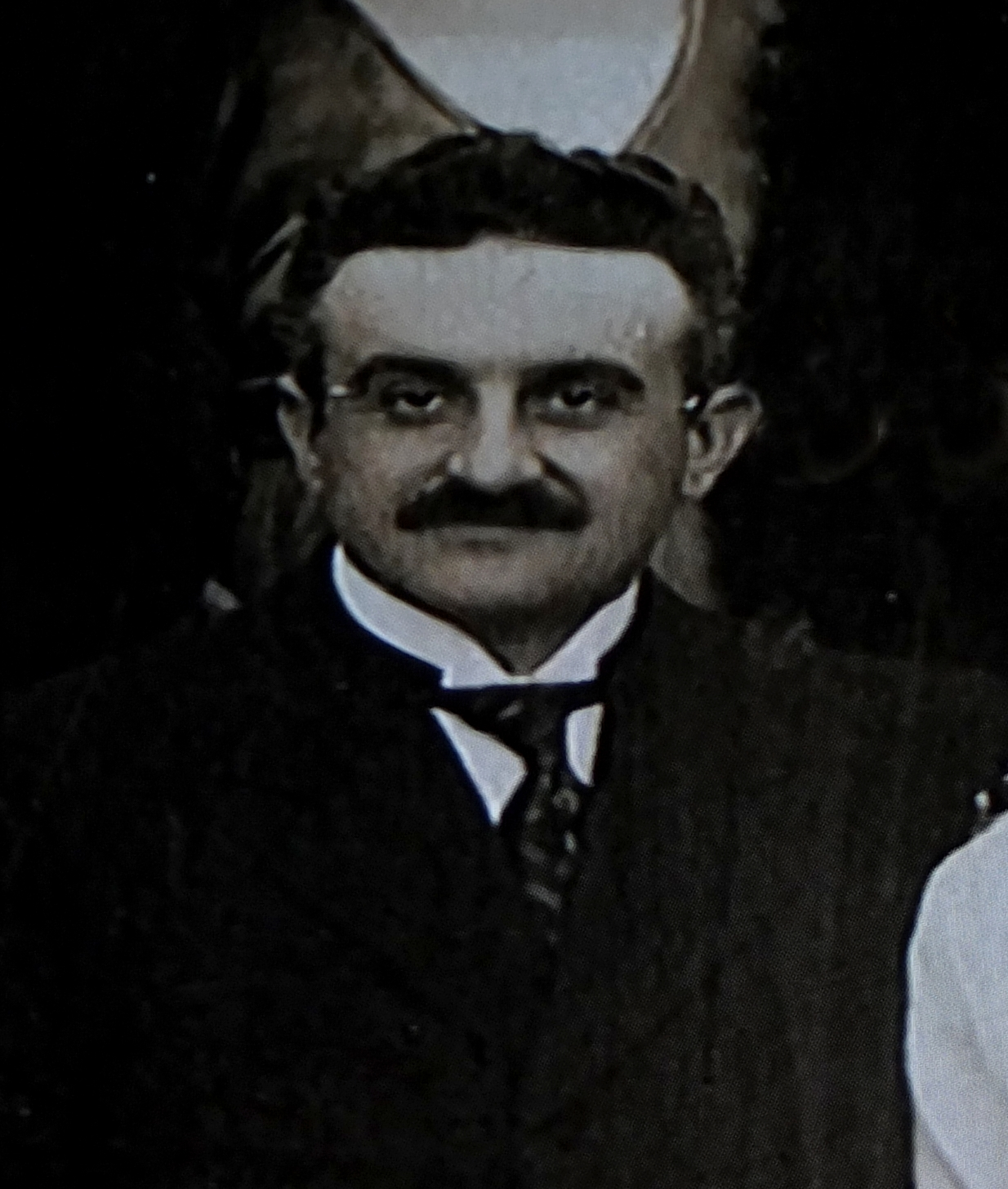
- Girard in 1920
- Born: 11 February 1881; Avignon, France
- Died: 26 May 1962 (aged 81); Avignon, France
- Education: École Nationale des Chartes
- Occupations: Historian; librarian; museum curator
- Spouse: Marie-Thérèse Fabre de Loye
- Children: 5

Joseph Girard (French pronunciation: [ʒozɛf ʒiʁaʁ]; 11 February 1881 – 26 May 1962) was a French historian, librarian and museum curator. He was born and died in Avignon, where an avenue is named after him.

== Life ==
He gained a licence to practice law before studying at the École Nationale des Chartes, where in 1903 he gained a diploma as a palaeographer-archivist. He was curator of the musée Calvet and its library from 1906 until 1949, when he became curator of the Palais des papes. Later he also became curator of art and antiquities of Vaucluse. Between 1909 and 1958, he published eleven works and studies on his work in the archives at the Palais des papes.

Anticlericalist and republican by nature, he married Marie-Thérèse Fabre de Loye (a fervent Catholic and most eligible young woman in Drôme) in Bouchet. They had two daughters and three sons, Henri, René, Marthe, Marie and Antoine.

== Works ==
- Le palais des papes d'Avignon, Éd. Bernaud, Avignon, 1904.
- Un musée du moulage au palais des papes, Annuaire de la société des amis du palais des papes, 1912.
- Au palais des papes : le musée des moulages, Annuaire de la société des amis du palais des papes, 1913.
- Le palais des papes. Guide officiel du visiteur, Éd. Commission municipale du palais des papes, 1913.
- Au palais des papes. Le musée des moulages. Les travaux de restauration. Les peintures du palais des papes, Annuaire de la société des amis du palais des papes, 1914.
- Avignon au temps des papes, Annuaire de la société des amis du palais des papes, 1921.
- Avignon après les papes, Annuaire de la société des amis du palais des papes, 1922.
- Avignon. Histoire et Monuments, Éd. Dominique Seguin, Avignon, 1924.
- Catalogue illustré du Musée Calvet, 1924.
- Avignon, histoire sommaire, guide des monuments, 1930.
- Avignon, ses monuments, ses Hôtels, ses trésors d'Art, 1930.
- L'ancienne église du collège des jésuites et le musée lapidaire d'Avignon, Mémoire de l'Académie de Vaucluse, 1933.
- Avignon avant les papes, Annuaire de la société des amis du palais des papes, 1935.
- Les Villeneuve-Martignan et leur Hôtel à Avignon, Mémoire de l'Académie de Vaucluse, 1935.
- L'Hôtel des Laurens à Avignon, Annuaire de la société des amis du palais des papes, 1938.
- Vaucluse, essai d'histoire locale, Éd. Aubanel, Avignon, 1944, in collaboration with Joseph Sautel, Sylvain Gagnière and Hyacinthe Chobaut.
- Le cloître du palais des papes, Annuaire de la société des amis du palais des papes et des monuments d'Avignon, T. XXX et XXXI, 1951–1952.
- Les aménagements du palais des papes pour le couronnement d'Innocent VI, Mémoire de l'Académie de Vaucluse, T. I, 1953.
- Le vivier du pape, Annuaire de la société des amis du palais des papes et des monuments d'Avignon, T. XXX et XXXI, 1953–1954.
- Histoire du Musée Calvet, 1955.
- Les Baroncelli à Avignon, 1957.
- Évocation du Vieil Avignon, Les Éditions de Minuit, Paris, 1958 et réédition 2000, ISBN 270731353X
