= Michael Alison =

British politician (1926–2004)

The Right Honourable Michael Alison

Member of Parliament for Selby (Barkston Ash 1964–1983)
- In office 15 October 1964 – 8 April 1997
- Succeeded by: John Grogan
- Preceded by: Leonard Ropner

Personal details
- Born: Michael James Hugh Alison; 27 June 1926 Margate, Kent, England
- Died: 28 May 2004 (aged 77)
- Party: Conservative
- Spouse: Sylvia Haigh (m. 1958)
- Children: 3 (including James)
- Education: Eton College
- Alma mater: Wadham College, Oxford; Ridley Hall, Cambridge

Michael James Hugh Alison (27 June 1926 – 28 May 2004) was a British Conservative politician.

Born in Margate, Kent, Alison was educated at Eton College; Wadham College, Oxford; and Ridley Hall, Cambridge. During the Second World War, he served in the Coldstream Guards. He was a councillor on Kensington Borough Council from 1956 to 1959 and a research worker on foreign affairs at the Conservative Research Department from 1958 to 1964.

He served as Member of Parliament for Barkston Ash from the 1964 general election until that constituency was abolished for the 1983 general election, and then for the constituency of Selby which replaced it, from 1983 until he stood down at the 1997 general election.

He held various junior ministerial posts under Margaret Thatcher, including serving as her Parliamentary Private Secretary (1983–87) and as a Minister of State (Northern Ireland Office 1979–81, Department of Employment 1981–83). For ten years from 1987 he was the Second Church Estates Commissioner.

== Family ==
In 1958 he married Sylvia Haigh, with whom he had two sons and a daughter. His son, James, is a noted Christian theologian and advocate of the acceptance of LGBTIQA+ people in the Church.

Parliament of the United Kingdom
Preceded by Sir Leonard Ropner	Member of Parliament for Barkston Ash; 1964–1983	Constituency abolished
New constituency	Member of Parliament for Selby; 1983–1997	Succeeded by John Grogan
Political offices
New title	Parliamentary Under-Secretary of State for Health and Social Security; 1970–1974	Succeeded by David Owen
Preceded by Peter Melchett	Minister of State for Northern Ireland; 1979–1981	Succeeded by Grey Gowrie
Preceded by Grey Gowrie	Minister of State for Employment; 1981–1983	Succeeded by Peter Morrison
Preceded by William van Straubenzee	Second Church Estates Commissioner; 1987–1997	Succeeded by Stuart Bell
Government offices
Preceded by Ian Gow	Parliamentary Private Secretary to the Prime Minister; 1983–1987	Succeeded by Archie Hamilton
