= Eric Gans =

American philosophical anthropologist and literary theorist

Eric Lawrence Gans
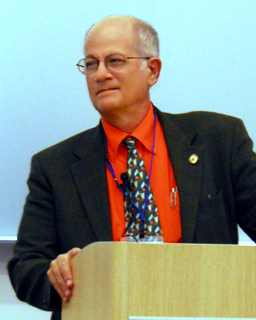
- Eric Gans at the Tokyo 2012 Generative Anthropology Society & Conference
- Born: August 21, 1941 (age 85) the Bronx, New York
- Awards: Phi Beta Kappa (junior year); Woodrow Wilson fellow (1960-61); Prix de la langue française (1977); Chevalier des Palmes Académiques (1982)

Education
- Education: Bronx High School of Science (1957); Columbia College (BA, 1960); Johns Hopkins University (MA, 1961); Johns Hopkins University (PhD, 1966)
- Thesis: The Discovery of Illusion: Flaubert's Early Works, 1835-1837 (1966)

Philosophical work
- Institutions: SUNY at Fredonia (1965-67); Indiana University (1967-69); UCLA (1969-); Johns Hopkins University (1978)
- Main interests: Generative anthropology Literary theory 19th-century French literature
- Notable works: The Origin of Language: A Formal Theory of Representation (1981)
- Notable ideas: The originary hypothesis Generative anthropology
- Website: Chronicles of Love and Resentment

Eric Lawrence Gans (born August 21, 1941) is an American philosophical anthropologist and literary theorist. Gans established a human science called generative anthropology (GA), which is based on the hypothesis that representation, language—insofar as it is the most fundamental form of representation—and the human species—insofar as it is defined against other animal species by its unique possession of language—could only have originated in an event, and which explains culture—insofar as it constitutes systems of representations—as the "generative" development of this event.

Gans claims that GA serves as a better foundation for the human sciences than the alternatives of (a) the natural sciences and (b) religion as it:

- (a) actually explains the origin of language unlike the natural sciences, which, by "explaining" it in terms of human language gradually emerging from non-human animal sign systems—ultimately in an attempt to ignore the uniqueness of human language—do not actually explain it at all; and
- (b) nevertheless remains consistent with the natural sciences unlike religion, which, despite actually explaining the origin of language, makes recourse to the supernatural in its explanations.

Gans edits Anthropoetics: The Journal of Generative Anthropology, an academic journal devoted to GA. He also publishes the Chronicles of Love and Resentment, a weblog dedicated to his reflections on a range of topics including popular culture, film, contemporary politics, philosophy and religion.

Gans has taught and published on 19th century literature, literary theory and film in the UCLA Department of French and Francophone studies.

== Life ==
Eric Lawrence Gans was born on 21 August 1941 in Parkchester, the Bronx to a middle-class Jewish family.

In 1957 Gans graduated from the Bronx High School of Science. In the same year he attended Columbia College. During his first year he majored in mathematics before switching to French at the end of his second. In 1960 he graduated with a BA in French. In the same year he attended Johns Hopkins University. During this period he studied with René Girard, who directed his dissertation on the early works of Gustave Flaubert. In 1961 he received an MA in Romance languages and in 1966 a PhD. From 1965-67 he taught at SUNY at Fredonia and from 1967-69 at Indiana University.

In 1969 Gans started teaching at UCLA. During this period he continued studying with Girard and was introduced to Batesonian psychology, particularly the notion of "pragmatic paradox" in Paul Watzlawick, Janet Beavin Bavelas and Donald deAvila Jackson's Pragmatics of Human Communication (1967), which influenced his own notion of "esthetic paradox" in Musset et le drame tragique (1974), Le Paradoxe de Phèdre (1975) and Essais d'esthétique paradoxale (1977). In 1976 he received full professorship and from 1974-77 sat as chairman of UCLA's French and Francophone Studies Department. In 1977 he was invited by Girard to Johns Hopkins as a visiting professor. At the end of his visit he conceived the germ of GA by combining his notions of esthetic paradox and the "ostensive sign" with Girard's notion of the scapegoat mechanism in La violence et le sacré (1972). Upon returning from Johns Hopkins he started writing The Origin of Language: A Formal Theory of Representation (1981).

In 1981, the same year that The Origin of Language was published, Gans resat as chairman of UCLA's French Department. In the subsequent years he elaborated and refined his hypothesis in a series of works starting with The End of Culture: Toward a Generative Anthropology (1985). In 1987 he started teaching seminars on GA. Later, in 2010, alumni of these seminars would found the Generative Anthropology Society & Conference (GASC), of which Gans is an honorary member. In 1990 UCLA's French Department held its first GA colloquium, which featured Marvin Harris as keynote speaker. In 1994, as a result of the activity of GA seminar alumni, the MLA held a session on GA at its annual meeting. In 1995 Gans co-founded Anthropoetics: The Journal of Generative Anthropology, a scholarly journal devoted to GA. During the 90s he sponsored a series of talks at the UCLA Society for the Study of Religion, which was chaired by David C. Rapoport. In 2007 he was honored with distinguished professor status. In 2014 he resigned from his professorship after being found in violation of UCLA's sexual misconduct policy. Since 2015 he has assumed distinguished professor emeritus status.

== Generative anthropology ==
Generative anthropology is a field of study based on the hypothesis that the origin of human language happened in a singular event. The discipline of Generative Anthropology centers upon this original event which Eric Gans calls The Originary Scene. This scene is a kind of origin story that hypothesizes the specific event where language originated. The Originary Scene is powerful because any human ability: our ability to do science, to be ironic, to love, to think, to dominate, etc can be carefully explained first by reference to this scene of origin.

Because the Originary Scene was the origin of all things human; Generative Anthropology attempts to understand all cultural phenomena in the simplest terms possible: all things human can be traced back to this hypothetical single origin point.

== Bibliography ==
=== Books and monographs ===
- The Discovery of Illusion: Flaubert's Early Works, 1835–37. Berkeley: University of California Press, 1971. ISBN 9780520093713.
- Un Pari contre l'histoire: les premières nouvelles de Mérimée (Mosaïque). Paris: Minard (Lettres modernes), 1972.
- Musset et le drame tragique. Paris: J. Corti, 1974.
- Le Paradoxe de Phèdre suivi du "Paradoxe constitutif du roman." Paris: A.G. Nizet, 1975. ISBN 9782707803696.
- Essais d'esthétique paradoxale. Paris: Gallimard, 1977. ISBN 9782070297115.
- The Origin of Language: A Formal Theory of Representation. Berkeley: University of California Press, 1981. ISBN 9780520042025.
- The End of Culture: Toward a Generative Anthropology. Berkeley: University of California Press, 1985. ISBN 9780520051812.
- Madame Bovary: The End of Romance. Boston: Twayne Publishers, 1989. ISBN 9780805780338.
- Science and Faith: The Anthropology of Revelation. Savage, Md.: Rowman & Littlefield, 1990. ISBN 9780847676590.
- Originary Thinking: Elements of Generative Anthropology. Stanford, California: Stanford University Press, 1993. ISBN 9780804721141.
- Signs of Paradox: Irony, Resentment, and Other Mimetic Structures. Stanford, California: Stanford University Press, 1997. ISBN 9780804727693.
- The Scenic Imagination: Originary Thinking from Hobbes to the Present Day. Stanford, California: Stanford University Press, 2007. ISBN 9780804757003.
- Carole Landis: A Most Beautiful Girl. Jackson: University of Mississippi Press, 2008. ISBN 9781604730135.
- A New Way of Thinking: Generative Anthropology in Religion, Philosophy, Art. Aurora, Colo.: Davies Group Publishers, 2011. ISBN 9781934542255.
- The Girardian Origins of Generative Anthropology. Imitatio/Amazon Digital Services, 2012. ASIN B0087VO5P0
- bijela krivnja / white guilt. Zagreb, Croatia: Kršćanska Sadašnjost, 2013. ISBN 9789531107488.
- Les fleurs du mal: a new translation. New York: Spuyten Duyvil, 2015. ISBN 9781941550427.
- Science and Faith: The Anthropology of Revelation (2nd ed.). Aurora, Colo.: Noesis Press, 2015. ISBN 9781934542521.
- (with Adam Katz) The First Shall Be The Last: Rethinking Antisemitism. Leiden: Brill/Martinus Nijhoff, 2015. ISBN 9789004298361.
- The Origin of Language: A New Edition. New York: Spuyten Duyvil, 2019. ISBN 9781949966138.

=== Selected articles ===
- "Differences." Modern Language Notes 96, no. 4 (May 1981): 792-808. https://doi.org/10.2307/2905837.
- "The Culture of Resentment." Philosophy and Literature 8, no. 1 (April 1984): 55-66. https://doi.org/10.1353/phl.1984.0043.
- "The Unique Source of Religion and Morality." Anthropoetics 1, no. 1 (June 1995). http://anthropoetics.ucla.edu/ap0101/gans.
- "Mimetic Paradox and the Event of Human Origin." Anthropoetics 1, no. 2 (December 1995). http://anthropoetics.ucla.edu/ap0102/mimesis.
- "Plato and the Birth of Conceptual Thought." Anthropoetics 2, no. 2 (January 1997). http://anthropoetics.ucla.edu/Ap0202/plato.
- "The Holocaust and the Victimary Revolution." In Poetics of the Americas: Race, Founding, and Textuality, edited by Bainard Cowan and Jefferson Humphries, 123-39. Baton Rouge: Louisiana State University Press, 1997.
- "Originary Narrative." Anthropoetics 3, no. 2 (February 1998). http://anthropoetics.ucla.edu/ap0302/narrative.
- "The Little Bang: The Early Origin of Language." Anthropoetics 5, no. 1 (Spring/Summer 1999). http://anthropoetics.ucla.edu/ap0501/gans-2.
- "The Sacred and the Social: Defining Durkheim's Anthropological Legacy." Anthropoetics 6, no. 1 (Spring/Summer 2000). http://anthropoetics.ucla.edu/ap0601/durkheim.
- "The Body Sacrificial." In The Body Aesthetic: From Fine Art to Body Modification, edited by Tobin Siebers, 159-78. Ann Arbor: University of Michigan Press, 2000.
- "Originary Democracy and the Critique of Pure Fairness." In The Democratic Experience and Political Violence, edited by David C. Rapoport and Leonard Weinberg, 308-24. London; Portland: F. Cass, 2001.
- (with Ammar Abdulhamid) "A Dialogue on the Middle East and Other Subjects." Anthropoetics 7, no. 2 (Fall 2001/Winter 2002). http://anthropoetics.ucla.edu/ap0702/dialog.
- "The Market and Resentment." In Passions in Economy, Politics, and the Media, edited by Wolfgang Palaver and Petra Steinmar-Pösel, 85-102. Vienna: Lit Verlag, 2005.
- "White Guilt, Past and Future." Anthropoetics 12, no. 2 (Fall 2006/Winter 2007). http://anthropoetics.ucla.edu/ap1202/wg.
- "On Firstness" and "Generative Anthropology and Bronx Romanticism." In The Originary Hypothesis: A Minimal Proposal for Humanistic Inquiry, edited by Adam Katz, 45-57 and 153-64. Aurora, Colo.: Davies Group Publishers, 2007.
- "Generative Anthropology: A New Way of Thinking?" Anthropoetics 13, no. 2 (Special GATE Issue, Fall 2007). http://anthropoetics.ucla.edu/ap1302/1302gans.
- "On the One Medium." In Mimesis, Movies, and Media (Violence, Desire, and the Sacred 3), edited by Scott Cowdell, Chris Fleming, and Joel Hodge, 7-15. New York; London: Bloomsbury Academic, 2015.
- "World War II and the Victimary Era." In Apocalypse Deferred: Girard and Japan, edited by Jeremiah L. Alberg, 41-54. Notre Dame: Notre Dame University Press, 2017.
- "Generative Anthropology." In The Palgrave Handbook of Mimetic Theory and Religion, edited by James Alison and Wolfgang Palaver, 447-53. New York: Palgrave Macmillan, 2017.
- "The Screenic." In Mimetic Theory and Film, edited by Paolo Bubbio and Chris Fleming, 109-21. New York: Bloomsbury Academic, 2019.
- "In the Beginning Was the Word: Generative Anthropology as a Religious Anthropology." In Generative Anthropology as Transdisciplinary Inquiry: Religion, Science, Language & Culture, edited by Magdalena Zlocka-Dabrowska and Beata Gaj, 21-34. Warsaw, Poland: Wydawnictwo Naukowe, 2018.

== See also ==
- Fundamental anthropology
- Deconstruction
