= Jesuit School of Philosophy and Theology =

Private Jesuit college in Belo Horizonte, Brazil

Coordinates: 19°50′18.82″S 43°57′8.38″W

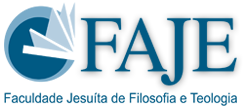
- Established: 1982; 44 years ago
- Rector: Elton Vitoriano Ribeiro, SJ
- Location: Belo Horizonte, Minas Gerais, Brazil
- Website: faculdadejesuíta

The Jesuit School of Philosophy and Theology (FAJE) is a private Jesuit college located in Belo Horizonte, Brazil.

It offers undergraduate and graduate courses in philosophy and theology. According to the General Course Index for the three-year period from 2009 to 2011, FAJE was considered the fifth best private college of higher education in Brazil, receiving a 5 on a scale from 1 to 5.

== Education ==
The Jesuit School of Philosophy and Theology offers two undergraduate courses, philosophy and theology, and two graduate courses, philosophy (master's degree) and theology (master's degree and doctorate). Theology is also offered as a specialization course.

== History ==
FAJE is maintained by the civil nonprofit and philanthropic Jesuit Education Association and Social Assistance (AJEAS) based in Belo Horizonte, through its subsidiary, the Vocational Technical Institute of St. Ignatius. It grew out of the Faculty of Philosophy created in 1941 in Nova Friburgo and was transferred to São Paulo in 1966, then to Rio de Janeiro in 1975 and finally to Belo Horizonte in 1982. The Faculty of Theology was founded in São Leopoldo in 1949, where it remained until being moved to Belo Horizonte, forming with the Faculty of Philosophy a single educational center for Jesuits from both Brazil and abroad. It is also open to students of the diocesan clergy, religious congregations, and lay men and women. As a Catholic Institution acknowledge by the Holy See as an Ecclesiastic Faculty, FAJE is known as Centro de Estudos Superiores da Companhia de Jesus (CES). The Vatican Dicastery for Culture and Education approved on 5 December 1983 the Statutes of the CES for four years and on 25 July 1989 definitively ratified its approval.

== See also ==
- List of Jesuit sites
