= René Girard =

French anthropologist and philosopher (1923–2015)

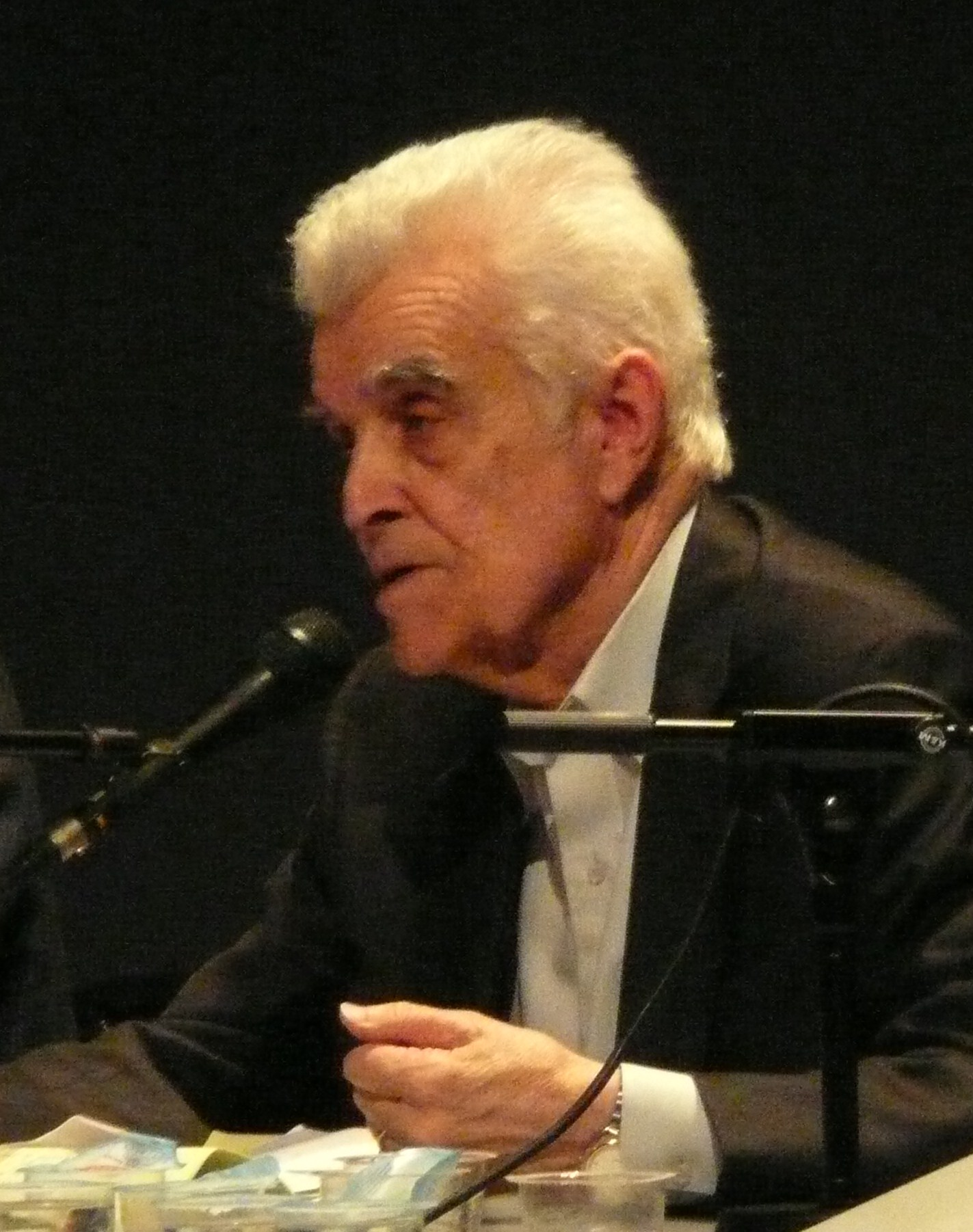
- Girard in 2007
- Born: René Noël Théophile Girard; 25 December 1923; Avignon, France
- Died: 4 November 2015 (aged 91); Stanford, California, U.S.
- Education: École Nationale des Chartes (MA); Indiana University Bloomington (PhD)
- Known for: Fundamental anthropology Mimetic theory Mimetic desire Mimetic double bind Scapegoat mechanism as the origin of sacrifice and foundation of human culture Girard's theory of group conflict
- Spouse: Martha Girard
- Children: 3
- Awards: Académie française (Seat 37); Knight of the Légion d’honneur Commandeur of the Ordre des Arts et des Lettres
- Scientific career
- Fields: History, literary criticism, philosophy of social science
- Workplaces: Duke University; Bryn Mawr College; Johns Hopkins University; State University of New York at Buffalo; Stanford University
- Notable students: Andrew Feenberg

René Noël Théophile Girard (/ʒɪəˈrɑːrd/; French: [ʁəne nɔɛl teɔfil ʒiʁaʁ]; 25 December 1923 – 4 November 2015) was a French academic best known for developing mimetic theory, which posits that human desire is fundamentally imitative, leading to rivalry, violence and the scapegoat mechanism as foundations of religion and culture. Holding academic appointments primarily in literature departments in the United States, his interdisciplinary work influenced fields ranging from theology to economics to psychology and cultural studies.

Girard first outlined the foundations of mimetic theory in his debut book Deceit, Desire, and the Novel (1961), a work of literary criticism, and extended it to anthropology in Violence and the Sacred (1972). Things Hidden Since the Foundation of the World (1978), considered his magnum opus, synthesized these ideas while applying them to a reinterpretation of Christian scriptures. Later accessible works, such as The Scapegoat (1982) and I See Satan Fall Like Lightning (1999) further elaborated his biblical insights.

In 2005, he was elected to the Académie Française, one of its 40 "immortals".

== Early life ==
Girard was born in Avignon on 25 December 1923. (Note: Noël, his second name, is also French for "Christmas", the day on which he was born.) René Girard was the second son of historian Joseph Girard.

He studied medieval history at the École des Chartes, Paris, where the subject of his thesis was "Private life in Avignon in the second half of the 15th century" ("La vie privée à Avignon dans la seconde moitié du XVe siècle").

In 1947, Girard went to Indiana University Bloomington on a one-year fellowship. He received his PhD in 1950 on the subject "American Opinion of France, 1940–1943". He stayed at Indiana University until 1953.

Although his research was in history, he was also assigned to teach French literature, the field in which he would first make his reputation as a literary critic by publishing influential essays on such authors as Albert Camus and Marcel Proust.

== Career ==
Girard occupied positions at Duke University and Bryn Mawr College from 1953 to 1957, after which he moved to Johns Hopkins University, Baltimore, where he became a full professor in 1961. In that year, he also published his first book: Mensonge romantique et vérité romanesque (Deceit, Desire and the Novel, 1966). For several years, he moved back and forth between the State University of New York at Buffalo and Johns Hopkins University. Books he published in this period include La Violence et le sacré (1972; Violence and the Sacred, 1977) and Des choses cachées depuis la fondation du monde (1978; Things Hidden Since the Foundation of the World, 1987).

In 1966, as the Chair of the Romance Languages Department at Johns Hopkins, Girard helped Richard A. Macksey, the Director of the newly founded Humanities Center, to organize a colloquium on French thought. The event was titled "The Languages of Criticism and the Sciences of Man" and was held from 18 to 21 October 1966. Featuring prominent French academics such as Jacques Lacan, Roland Barthes, and Jacques Derrida, it is often credited with having launched the post-structuralist movement.

In 1981, Girard became Andrew B. Hammond Professor of French Language, Literature, and Civilization at Stanford University, where he stayed until his retirement in 1995. During this period, he published Le Bouc émissaire (1982), La route antique des hommes pervers (1985), A Theatre of Envy: William Shakespeare (1991) and Quand ces choses commenceront ... (1994).

In 1985, he received his first honorary degree from the Vrije Universiteit Amsterdam in the Netherlands; several others followed.

In 1990, a group of scholars founded the Colloquium on Violence and Religion (COV&R) with the goal to "explore, criticize, and develop the mimetic model of the relationship between violence and religion in the genesis and maintenance of culture." This organization organizes a yearly conference devoted to topics related to mimetic theory, scapegoating, violence, and religion. Girard was Honorary Chair of COV&R. Co-founder and first president of the COV&R was the Roman Catholic theologian Raymund Schwager.

René Girard's work has inspired interdisciplinary research projects and experimental research such as the Mimetic Theory project sponsored by the John Templeton Foundation.

On 17 March 2005, Girard was elected to the Académie française, taking the seat left vacant by Dominican priest Ambroise-Marie Carré.

== Personal life ==
René Girard's wife, Martha (née McCullough), was American; they were married from 1952 until his death. They had two sons, Martin Girard (born 1955) and Daniel Girard (born 1957), and a daughter, Mary Brown-Girard (born 1960).

Girard converted from agnosticism to Christianity while reading Dostoevsky, in preparation for his first book in 1961. For the rest of his life, he was a practising Catholic.

On 4 November 2015, Girard died at his residence in Stanford, California, at the age of 91.

== Girard's thought ==
=== Overview ===
Girard's first main contribution is in the psychology of desire. Girard claimed that human desire functions imitatively, or mimetically, rather than arising as the spontaneous byproduct of human individuality, as much of theoretical psychology had assumed. Girard proposed that human development proceeds triangularly from a model of desire that indicates some object of desire as desirable by desiring it themselves. We copy this desire for the object of the model and appropriate it as our own, most often without recognizing that the source of this desire comes from another apart from ourselves completing the triangle of mimetic desire. This process of appropriation of desire includes (but is not limited to) identity formation, the transmission of knowledge and social norms, and material aspirations which all have their origin in copying the desires of others who we take, consciously or unconsciously, as models for desire.

The second major proposition of the mimetic theory proceeds from considering the consequences of the mimetic nature of desire as it relates to human origins and anthropology. The mimetic nature of desire allows for the anthropological success of human beings through social learning but is also laden with potential for violent escalation. If the subject desires an object simply because another subject desires it, then their desires are bound to converge on the same objects. If these objects cannot be easily shared (food, mates, territory, prestige and status, etc.), then the subjects are bound to come into mimetically intensifying conflict over these objects. The simplest solution to this problem of violence for early human communities was to polarize blame and hostility onto one member of the group who would be killed and interpreted as the source of conflict and hostility within the group. The transition from the violent conflict of all-against-all would be transformed into the unifying and pacifying violence of all-except-one whose death would reconcile the community together. The victim who was persecuted as the source of disorder would then become venerated as the source of order and meaning for the community and seen as a god. This process of engendering and making possible human community through arbitrary victimization is called, within mimetic theory, the scapegoat mechanism.

Eventually, the scapegoat mechanism would be exposed within the Biblical texts which categorically reorient the position of the Divinity to be on the side of the victim as opposed to that of the persecuting community. Girard argues that all other myths, such as Romulus and Remus, for example, are written and constructed from the point of view of the community whose legitimacy depends on the guilt of the victim in order to be brought together as a unified community. Once the relative innocence of the victim is exposed, the scapegoat mechanism is no longer able to function as a vehicle for generating unity and peace. The categorical moral innocence of Christ therefore serves to reveal the scapegoating mechanism in scripture, thus enabling the possibility that humanity might overcome it by learning to discern its continued presence in our interactions today.

=== Mimetic desire ===
After almost a decade of teaching French literature in the United States, Girard began to develop a new way of speaking about literary texts. Beyond the "uniqueness" of individual works, he looked for their common structural properties, having observed that characters in great fiction evolved in a system of relationships otherwise common to the wider generality of novels. But there was a distinction to be made:

Only the great writers succeed in painting these mechanisms faithfully, without falsifying them: we have here a system of relationships that paradoxically, or rather not paradoxically at all, has less variability the greater a writer is.

Girard saw Proust's “psychological laws” mirrored in reality. These laws and this system are the consequences of a fundamental reality grasped by the novelists, which Girard called mimetic desire, "the mimetic character of desire." This is the content of his first book, Deceit, Desire and the Novel (1961). We borrow our desires from others. Far from being autonomous, our desire for a certain object is always provoked by the desire of another person—the model—for this same object. This means that the relationship between the subject and the object is not direct: but unrolls within a triangular relationship of subject, model, and object. Through the model, one is drawn to the object.

Girard calls desire "metaphysical" in the measure that, as soon as a desire is something more than a simple need or appetite, "all desire is a desire to be", it is an aspiration, the dream of a fullness attributed to the mediator.

Mediation is called "external" when the mediator of the desire is socially beyond the reach of the subject or, for example, a fictional character, as in the case of Amadis de Gaula and Don Quixote.

Mediation is called "internal" when the mediator is at the same level as the subject. The mediator then transforms into a rival and an obstacle to the acquisition of the object, whose value increases as rivalry grows.

This is the universe of the novels of Stendhal, Flaubert, Proust and Dostoevsky, which are particularly studied in this book.

Through their characters, our own behaviour is displayed. Everyone holds firmly to the illusion of the authenticity of one's own desires; the novelists implacably expose all the diversity of lies, dissimulations, manoeuvres, and the snobbery of the Proustian heroes; these are all but "tricks of desire", which prevent one from facing the truth: envy and jealousy. These characters, desiring the being of the mediator, project upon him superhuman virtues while at the same time depreciating themselves, making him a god while making themselves slaves, in the measure that the mediator is an obstacle to them. Some, pursuing this logic, come to seek the failures that are the signs of the proximity of the ideal to which they aspire. This can manifest as a heightened experience of the universal pseudo-masochism inherent in seeking the unattainable, which can, of course, turn into sadism should the actor play this part in reverse.

This fundamental focus on mimetic desire would be pursued by Girard throughout the rest of his career. Farneti (2013) also discusses the role of mimetic desire in intractable conflicts, using the case study of the Israeli-Palestinian conflict and referencing Girard's theory. He posits that intensified conflict is a product of the imitative behaviours of Israelis and Palestinians, entitling them "Siamese twins".

The idea that the desire to possess endless material wealth was harmful to society was not new. From the New Testament verses about the love of money being the root of all kinds of evil, to Hegelian and Marxist critique that saw material wealth and capital as the mechanism of alienation of the human being both from their own humanity and their community, to Bertrand Russell's famous speech on accepting the Nobel Prize in Literature in 1950, desire has been understood as a destructive force in all of literature – with the theft of Helen by Paris a frequent topic of discussion by Girard.

What Girard contributed to this concept is the idea that what is desired fundamentally is not the object itself, but the ontological state of the subject which possesses it, where mimicry is the aim of the competition. What Paris wanted, then, was not Helen, but to be a great king like Menelaus or Agamemnon.

A person desires to be like the subject he imitates through the medium of the object that is possessed by the person he imitates. Girard claims:

It is not difference that dominates the world, but the obliteration of difference by mimetic reciprocity, which itself, being truly universal, shows the relativism of perpetual difference to be an illusion.

This was, and remains, a pessimistic view of human life, as it posits a paradox in the very act of seeking to unify and have peace, since the erasure of differences between people through mimicry is what creates conflict, not the differentiation itself.

=== Fundamental anthropology ===
Since the mimetic rivalry that develops from the struggle for the possession of the objects is contagious, it leads to the threat of violence. Girard himself says, "If there is a normal order in societies, it must be the fruit of an anterior crisis." Turning his interest towards the anthropological domain, Girard began to study anthropological literature and proposed his second hypothesis: the scapegoat mechanism, which he believed to be at the origin of archaic religion and which he sets forth in his second book Violence and the Sacred (1972), a work on fundamental anthropology.

If two individuals desire the same thing, there will soon be a third, then a fourth. This process quickly snowballs. Since from the beginning desire is aroused by the other (and not by the object) the object is soon forgotten and the mimetic conflict transforms into a general antagonism. At this stage of the crisis the antagonists will no longer imitate each other's desires for an object, but each other's antagonism. They wanted to share the same object, but now they want to destroy the same enemy.

So, a paroxysm of violence will then focus on an arbitrary victim and a unanimous antipathy would, mimetically, grow against him. The brutal elimination of the victim will reduce the appetite for violence that possessed everyone a moment before, and leave the group, suddenly appeased and calm. The victim lies before the group, appearing simultaneously as the origin of the crisis and as the one responsible for this miracle of renewed peace. He becomes sacred, that is to say the bearer of the prodigious power of defusing the crisis and bringing peace back.

Girard believes this to be the genesis of archaic religion, that is, ritual sacrifice as the repetition of the original event, of myth as an account of this event, of the taboos that forbid access to all the objects at the origin of the rivalries that degenerated into this absolutely traumatizing crisis. This religious elaboration takes place gradually over the course of the repetition of the mimetic crises whose resolution brings only temporary peace. The elaboration of the rites and of the taboos constitutes a kind of "empirical" knowledge about violence.

Explorers and anthropologists have never been able to witness or bring true evidence for events similar to these, which go back to the earliest times. Yet 'indirect evidence' can be found, such as the universality of ritual sacrifice and the innumerable myths that have been collected from the most varied peoples. If Girard's theory is true, then we will find in myths the culpability of the victim-god, depictions of the selection of the victim and his power to beget the order that governs the group.

Girard found these elements in numerous myths, beginning with that of Oedipus which he analyzed in this and later books. On this question he opposes Claude Lévi-Strauss.

The phrase "scapegoat mechanism" was not coined by Girard himself; it had been used earlier by Kenneth Burke in Permanence and Change (1935) and A Grammar of Motives (1940). However, Girard took this concept from Burke and developed it much more extensively as an interpretation of human culture.

In Things Hidden Since the Foundation of the World (1978), Girard develops the implications of this discovery. The victimary process is the missing link between the animal world and the human world, the principle that explains the humanization of primates.

It allows us to understand the need for sacrificial victims, which in turn explains the hunt which is ritual and the domestication of animals as a result of the acclimatization of a reserve of victims, or agriculture. It shows that the beginning of all culture is archaic religion, which Durkheim had sensed. The elaboration of the rites and taboos by proto-human or human groups takes varied forms while obeying a rigorous practical sense: the prevention of the return of the mimetic crisis. So we can find in archaic religion the origin of all political or cultural institutions.

According to Girard, just as the theory of natural selection of species is the rational principle that explains the immense diversity of forms of life, the victimization process is the rational principle that explains the origin of the infinite diversity of cultural forms.

=== Origin of language ===
According to Girard, the origin of language is also related to scapegoating. After the first victim, after the murder of the first scapegoat, there were the first prohibitions and rituals, but these came into being before representation and language, hence before culture. And that means that "people" (perhaps not human beings) "will not start fighting again." Girard says:

If mimetic disruption comes back, our instinct will tell us to do again what the sacred has done to save us, which is to kill the scapegoat. Therefore it would be the force of substitution of immolating another victim instead of the first. But the relationship of this process with representation is not one that can be defined in a clear-cut way. This process would be one that moves towards representation of the sacred, towards definition of the ritual as ritual and prohibition as prohibition. But this process would already begin prior the representation, you see, because it is directly produced by the experience of the misunderstood scapegoat.

According to Girard, the substitution of an immolated victim for the first, is "the very first symbolic sign created by the hominids." Girard also says this is the first time that one thing represents another thing, standing in the place of this (absent) one.

This substitution is the beginning of representation and language and also the beginning of sacrifice and ritual. The genesis of language and ritual is very slow and we must imagine that there are also kinds of rituals among the animals: "It is the originary scapegoating which prolongs itself in a process which can be infinitely long in moving from, how should I say, from instinctive ritualization, instinctive prohibition, instinctive separation of the antagonists, which you already find to a certain extent in animals, towards representation."

Unlike Eric Gans, Girard does not think that there is an original scene during which there is "a sudden shift from non-representation to representation," or a sudden shift from animality to humanity.

According to the French sociologist Camille Tarot, it is hard to understand how the process of representation (i.e., symbolicity and language) actually occurs and he has called this a black box in Girard's theory.

Girard also says:

One great characteristic of man is what they [the authors of the modern theory of evolution] call neoteny, the fact that the human infant is born premature, with an open skull, no hair and a total inability to fend for himself. To keep it alive, therefore, there must be some form of cultural protection, because in the world of mammals, such infants would not survive, they would be destroyed. Therefore there is a reason to believe that in the later stages of human evolution, culture and nature are in constant interaction.

The first stages of this interaction must occur prior to language, but they must include forms of sacrifice and prohibition that create a space of non-violence around the mother and the children which make it possible to reach still higher stages of human development. You can postulate as many such stages as are needed.

Thus, you can have a transition between ethology and anthropology which removes, I think, all philosophical postulates. The discontinuities would never be of such a nature as to demand some kind of sudden intellectual illumination.

=== Christian scriptures ===
==== Biblical text as a science of man ====
In Things Hidden Since the Foundation of the World, Girard discusses for the first time Christianity and the Bible. The Gospels ostensibly present themselves as a typical mythical account, with a victim-God lynched by an unanimous crowd, an event that is then commemorated by Christians through ritual sacrifice — a material re-presentation in this case — in the Eucharist. The parallel is perfect except for one detail: the truth of the innocence of the Victim is proclaimed by the text and the writer.

The mythical account is usually built on the lie of the guilt of the victim in as much as it is an account of the event seen from the viewpoint of the anonymous lynchers. This ignorance is indispensable to the efficacy of sacrificial violence.

The evangelic "good news" clearly affirms the innocence of the victim, thus becoming, by attacking ignorance, the germ of the destruction of the sacrificial order on which the equilibrium of societies rests. Already the Old Testament shows this turning inside-out of the mythic accounts with regard to the innocence of the victims (Abel, Joseph, Job...), and the Hebrews were conscious of the uniqueness of their religious tradition.

Girard draws special attention to passages in the Book of Isaiah, which describe the suffering of the Servant of the Lord God at the hands of the entire community who emphasize his innocence (Isaiah 53, 2–9).

By oppression and judgement he was taken away;

And as for his generation, who considered

That he was cut off from out of the land of the living,

Stricken for the transgression of my people?

And they made his grave with the wicked

And with a rich man in his death,

Although he had done no violence,

And there was no deceit in his mouth. (Isaiah 53, 8–9)

In the Gospels, the "things hidden since the foundation of the world" (Matthew 13:35) are unveiled with full clarity: the foundation of social order on murder, described in all its repulsive ugliness in the account of the Passion.

This revelation is even clearer because the whole text is a work on desire and violence, from the desire of Eve in paradise to the prodigious strength of the mimetism that brings about the denial of Peter at Pesach (Mark 14: 66–72; Luke 22:54–62).

Girard reinterprets certain biblical expressions in light of his theories; for instance, he sees "scandal" (skandalon, literally, a "snare", or an "impediment placed in the way and causing one to stumble or fall") as signifying mimetic rivalry, as in Peter's denial of Jesus. No one escapes responsibility, neither the envious nor the envied: "Woe to the man through whom scandal comes" (Matthew 18:7).

==== Christian society ====
The evangelical revelation contains the truth on the violence, available for two thousand years, Girard tells us. Has it put an end to the sacrificial order based on violence in the society that has claimed the gospel text as its own religious text? No, he replies, for in order for a truth to have an impact it must find a receptive listener, and people do not change quickly. The gospel text has instead acted as a ferment that brings about the decomposition of the sacrificial order. While medieval Europe showed the face of a sacrificial society that still knew very well how to despise and ignore its victims, nonetheless the efficacy of sacrificial violence has never stopped decreasing, in the measure that ignorance receded. Here Girard sees the principle of the uniqueness and of the transformations of the Western society whose destiny today is, in his view, one with that of human society as a whole.

Does the retreat of the sacrificial order mean less violence? Not at all; rather, it deprives modern societies of most of the capacity of sacrificial violence to establish temporary order. The "innocence" of the time of the ignorance is no more. On the other hand, Christianity, following the example of Judaism, has desacralized the world, making possible a utilitarian relationship with nature. Increasingly threatened by the resurgence of mimetic crises on a grand scale, the contemporary world is on one hand more quickly caught up by its guilt, and on the other hand has developed such a great technical power of destruction that it is condemned to both more and more responsibility and less and less innocence.

So, for example, while empathy for victims manifests progress in the moral conscience of society, it nonetheless also takes the form of a competition among victims that threatens an escalation of violence. Girard is critical of the optimism of humanist observers, who believe in the natural goodness of man and the progressive improvement of his historical conditions (views themselves based in a misunderstanding of the Christian revelation). Rather, the current nuclear stalemate between the great powers reveals that man's capacity for violence is greater than ever before, and peace is only a product of this possibility to unleash apocalyptic destruction.

=== Precursors ===
Some critics have pointed out that while Girard may be the first to have suggested that all desire is mimetic, he is by no means the first to have noticed that some desire is mimetic – Gabriel Tarde's book Les lois de l'imitation (The Laws of Imitation) appeared in 1890. Building on Tarde, crowd psychology, Nietzsche, and more generally on a modernist tradition of the "mimetic unconscious" that had hypnosis as its via regia, Nidesh Lawtoo argued that for the modernists not only desire but all affects turn out to be contagious and mimetic. René Pommier mentions La Rochefoucauld, a seventeenth-century thinker who already wrote that "Nothing is so infectious as example" and that "There are some who never would have loved if they never had heard it spoken of."

Stéphane Vinolo sees Baruch Spinoza and Thomas Hobbes as important precursors. Hobbes: "if any two men desire the same thing, which nevertheless they cannot both enjoy, they become enemies." Spinoza: "By the very fact that we conceive a thing, which is like ourselves, and which we have not regarded with any emotion, to be affected with any emotion, we are ourselves affected with a like emotion. Proof… If we conceive anyone similar to ourselves as affected by any emotion, this conception will express a modification of our body similar to that emotion."

Wolfgang Palaver adds Alexis de Tocqueville to the list. "Two hundred years after Hobbes, the French historian Alexis de Tocqueville mentioned the dangers coming along with equality, too. Like Hobbes, he refers to the increase of mimetic desire coming along with equality." Palaver has in mind passages like this one, from Tocqueville's Democracy in America: "They have swept away the privileges of some of their fellow creatures which stood in their way, but they have opened the door to universal competition; the barrier has changed its shape rather than its position."

Maurizio Meloni highlights the similarities between Girard, Jacques Lacan and Sigmund Freud. Meloni claims that these similarities arise because the projects undertaken by the three men—namely, to understand the role of mythology in structuring the human psyche and culture—were very similar. What is more, both Girard and Lacan read these myths through the lens of structural anthropology so it is not surprising that their intellectual systems came to resemble one another so strongly. Meloni writes that Girard and Lacan were "moved by similar preoccupations and are fascinated by and attracted to the same kind of issues: the constituent character of the other in the structure of desire, the role of jealousy and rivalry in the construction of the social bond, the proliferation of triangles within apparently dual relations, doubles and mirrors, imitation and the Imaginary, and the crisis of modern society within which the 'rite of Oedipus' is situated."

At times, Girard acknowledges his indebtedness to such precursors, including Tocqueville.

== Influence ==
=== Economics ===
The mimetic theory has also been applied in the study of economics, most notably in La violence de la monnaie (1982) by Michel Aglietta and André Orléan. Orléan was also a contributor to the volume René Girard in Les cahiers de l'Herne ("Pour une approche girardienne de l'homo oeconomicus"). According to the philosopher of technology Andrew Feenberg:

In La violence de la monnaie, Aglietta and Orléan follow Girard in suggesting that the basic relation of exchange can be interpreted as a conflict of 'doubles', each mediating the desire of the Other. Like Lucien Goldmann, they see a connection between Girard's theory of mimetic desire and the Marxian theory of commodity fetishism. In their theory, the market takes the place of the sacred in modern life as the chief institutional mechanism stabilizing the otherwise explosive conflicts of desiring subjects.

In an interview with the Unesco Courier, anthropologist and social theorist Mark Anspach (editor of the René Girard issue of Les Cahiers de l'Herne) explains that Aglietta and Orléan (who were very critical of economic rationality) see the classical theory of economics as a myth. According to Anspach, the vicious circle of violence and vengeance generated by mimetic rivalry gives rise to the gift economy, as a means to overcome it and achieve peaceful reciprocity: "Instead of waiting for your neighbour to come steal your yams, you offer them to him today, and it is up to him to do the same for you tomorrow. Once you have made a gift, he is obliged to make a return gift. Now you have set in motion a positive circularity."

Since the gift may be so large as to be humiliating, a second stage of development—"economic rationality"—is required: this liberates the seller and the buyer of any other obligations than to give money. Thus reciprocal violence is eliminated by the sacrifice, obligations of vengeance by the gift, and finally the possibly dangerous gift by "economic rationality." This rationality, however, creates new victims.

=== Literature ===
Girard's influence extends beyond philosophy and social science, and includes the literary realm. A prominent example of a fiction writer influenced by Girard is J. M. Coetzee, winner of the 2003 Nobel Prize in Literature. Critics have noted that mimetic desire and scapegoating are recurring themes in Coetzee's novels Elizabeth Costello and Disgrace. In the latter work, the book's protagonist also gives a speech about the history of scapegoating with noticeable similarities to Girard's view of the same subject. Coetzee has also frequently cited Girard in his non-fiction essays, on subjects ranging from advertising to the Russian writer Aleksandr Solzhenitsyn.

=== Theology ===
Theologians who describe themselves as indebted to Girard include James Alison (who focuses on mimetic desire's implications for the doctrine of original sin), and Raymund Schwager (who builds a dramatic narrative around both the scapegoat mechanism and the theo-drama of fellow Swiss theologian Hans Urs von Balthasar).

== Criticism ==
=== Use of evidence ===
Girard has presented his view as being scientifically grounded: "Our theory should be approached, then, as one approaches any scientific hypothesis." René Pommier has written a book about Girard with the ironic title René Girard : un allumé qui se prend pour un phare in which he asserts that Girard's readings of myths and Bible stories—the basis of some of his most important claims—are often tendentious. Girard notes, for example, that the disciples actively turn against Jesus. Since Peter warms himself by a fire, and fires always create community, and communities breed mimetic desire, this means that Peter becomes actively hostile to Jesus, seeking his death. According to Pommier, Girard claims that the Gospels present the Crucifixion as a purely human affair, with no indication of Christ dying for the sins of mankind, a claim contradicted by Mark 10:45 and Matthew 20:28.

The same goes for readings of literary texts, says Pommier. For example, Molière's Don Juan only pursues one love object for mediated reasons, not all of them, as Girard claims. Or again, Sancho Panza wants an island not because he is catching the bug of romanticism from Don Quixote, but because he has been promised one. And Pavel Pavlovitch Trusotsky, in Dostoevsky's Eternal Husband, has been married for ten years before Alexei Veltchaninov becomes his rival, so Veltchaninov is not in fact essential to Pavel's desire.

Accordingly, a number of scholars have suggested that Girard's writings are metaphysics rather than science. Theorist of history Hayden White did so in an article titled "Ethnological 'Lie' and Mystical 'Truth'"; Belgian anthropologist Luc de Heusch made a similar claim in his piece "L'Evangile selon Saint-Girard" ("The Gospel according to Saint Girard"); and Jean Greisch sees Girard's thought as more or less a kind of Gnosis. Nidesh Lawtoo, while crediting Girard as a precursor of mimetic studies, argues that his focus on triangles of desire, ambivalent relations with a model, and the hypothesis of a founding murder at the origins of culture owes more to Sigmund Freud than Girard is willing to acknowledge.

=== Non-mimetic desires ===
René Pommier has pointed out a number of problems with the Girardian claim that all desire is mimetic. First, it is very hard to explain the existence of taboo desires, such as homosexuality in repressive societies, on that basis. Second, every situation presents large numbers of potential mediators, which means that the individual has to make a choice among them; either authentic choice is possible, then, or else the theory leads to a regress. Third, Girard leaves no room for innovation: Surely somebody has to be the first to desire a new object, even if everyone else follows that trend-setter.

One might also argue that the last objection ignores the influence of an original sin from which all others follow, which Girard clearly affirms. However, original sin, according to Girard's interpretation, explains only our propensity to imitate, not the specific content of our imitated desires. Thus, the doctrine of original sin does not solve the problem of how the original model first acquires the desire that is subsequently imitated by others.

=== Beneficial imitation ===
In the early part of Girard's career, there seemed no place for beneficial imitation. Jean-Michel Oughourlian objected that "imitation can be totally peaceful and beneficial; I don't believe that I am the other, I don't want to take his place. …This imitation can lead me to become sensitive to social and political problems." Rebecca Adams argued that because Girard's theories fixated on violence, he was creating a "scapegoat" himself with his own theory: the scapegoat of positive mimesis. Adams proposed a reassessment of Girard's theory that includes an account of loving mimesis or, as she preferred to call it, creative mimesis.

More recently, Girard has made room for positive imitation. But as Adams implies, it is not clear how the revised theory accords with earlier claims about the origin of culture. If beneficial imitation is possible, then it is no longer necessary for cultures to be born by means of scapegoating; they could just as well be born through healthy emulation. Nidesh Lawtoo further develops the healthy side of mimetic contagion by drawing on a Nietzschean philosophical tradition that privileges "laughter" and other gay forms of "sovereign communication" in the formation of "community."

=== Anthropology ===
Various anthropologists have contested Girard's claims. Elizabeth Traube, for example, reminds us that there are other ways of making sense of the data that Girard borrows from Evans-Pritchard and company—ways that are more consistent with the practices of the given culture. By applying a one-size-fits-all approach, Girard "loses … the ability to tell us anything about cultural products themselves, for the simple reason that he has annihilated the cultures which produced them."

=== Religion ===
One of the main sources of criticism of Girard's work comes from intellectuals who claim that his comparison of Christian texts vis-à-vis other religions leaves something to be desired. In particular, it has often been argued that he distorts the meaning of classical texts and myths in order to present Christian doctrine in a more favourable light. There are also those who find the interpretation of the Christ narrative—as a purely human event, having nothing to do with redemption from sin—an unconvincing one, given what the Gospels themselves say. Yet Roger Scruton objects that Girard's account has a divine Jesus: "that Jesus was the first scapegoat to understand the need for his death and to forgive those who inflicted it … Girard argues, Jesus gave the best evidence … of his divine nature."

== Honours and awards ==
- Honorary degrees at the Vrije Universiteit Amsterdam (the Netherlands, 1985), UFSIA in Antwerp (Belgium, 1995), the University of Padua (Italy, 2001, honorary degree in "Arts"), the faculty of theology at the University of Innsbruck (Austria), the Université de Montréal (Canada, 2004), and the University of St Andrews (UK, 2008)
- The Prix Médicis essai for Shakespeare, les feux de l'envie (A Theatre of Envy: William Shakespeare, 1991)
- The prix Aujourd'hui for Les origines de la culture (2004)
- Guggenheim Fellow (1959 and 1966)
- Election to the Académie française (2005)
- Awarded the Dr. Leopold Lucas Prize by the University of Tübingen (2006)
- Awarded the Order of Isabella the Catholic, Commander by Number, by the Spanish head of state, H.M. King Juan Carlos

== Bibliography ==
This section only lists book-length publications that René Girard wrote or edited. For articles and interviews by René Girard, the reader can refer to the database maintained at the University of Innsbruck. Some of the books below reprint articles (To Double Business Bound, 1978; Oedipus Unbound, 2004; Mimesis and Theory, 2008) or are based on articles (A Theatre of Envy, 1991).

- Girard, René (2001) [First published 1961], Mensonge romantique et vérité romanesque [Romantic lie & romanesque truth] (in French) (reprint ed.), Paris: Grasset, ISBN 2-246-04072-8 (English translation: ——— (1966), Deceit, Desire and the Novel: Self and Other in Literary Structure, Baltimore: Johns Hopkins University Press, ISBN 0-8018-1830-3).
- ——— (1962), Proust: A Collection of Critical Essays, Englewood Cliffs: Prentice Hall.
- ——— (1963), Dostoïevski, du double à l'unité [Dostoievsky, from the double to the unity] (in French), Paris: Plon (English translation: ——— (1997), Resurrection from the Underground: Feodor Dostoevsky, Crossroad).
- 1972. La violence et le sacré. Paris: Grasset. ISBN 978-2-246-00051-8. (English translation: Violence and the Sacred. Translated by Patrick Gregory. Baltimore: Johns Hopkins University Press, 1977. ISBN 0-8018-2218-1.) The reprint in the Pluriel series (1996; ISBN 2-01-008984-7) contains a section entitled "Critiques et commentaires", which reproduces several reviews of La Violence et le Sacré.
- 1976. Critique dans un souterrain. Lausanne: L'Age d'Homme. Reprint 1983, Livre de Poche: ISBN 978-2-253-03298-4. This book contains Dostoïevski, du double à l'unité and a number of other essays published between 1963 and 1972.
- 1978. "To double business bound": Essays on Literature, Mimesis, and Anthropology. Baltimore: Johns Hopkins University Press. ISBN 978-0-8018-2114-1. This book contains essays from Critique dans un souterrain but not those on Dostoyevski.
- 1978. Des choses cachées depuis la fondation du monde. Paris: Grasset. ISBN 2-246-61841-X. (English translation: Things Hidden since the Foundation of the World: Research undertaken in collaboration with Jean-Michel Oughourlian and G. Lefort. Stanford: Stanford University Press, 1987)
- 1982. Le bouc émissaire. Paris: Grasset. ISBN 2-246-26781-1. (English translation: The Scapegoat. Baltimore: The Johns Hopkins University Press, 1986)
- 1985. La route antique des hommes pervers. Paris: Grasset. ISBN 2-246-35111-1. (English translation: Job, the Victim of His People. Stanford: Stanford University Press, 1987)
- 1988. Violent Origins: Walter Burkert, Rene Girard, and Jonathan Z. Smith on Ritual Killing and Cultural Formation. Ed. by Robert Hamerton-Kelly. Palo Alto, California: Stanford University Press. ISBN 0-8047-1518-1.
- 1991. A Theatre of Envy: William Shakespeare. New York: Oxford University Press. ISBN 0-19-505339-7. The French translation, Shakespeare : les feux de l'envie, was published before the original English text.
- ——— (1994), Quand ces choses commenceront ... Entretiens avec Michel Treguer [When these things will begin... interviews with Michel Treguer] (in French), Paris: Arléa, ISBN 2-86959-300-7.
- 1996. The Girard Reader. Ed. by. James G. Williams. New York: Crossroad. ISBN 0-8245-1634-6.
- 1999. Je vois Satan tomber comme l'éclair. Paris: Grasset. ISBN 2-246-26791-9. (English translation: I See Satan Fall Like Lightning. Maryknoll: Orbis Books, 2001 ISBN 978-1-57075-319-0)
- ——— (2000), Um Longo Argumento do princípio ao Fim: Diálogos com João Cezar de Castro Rocha e Pierpaolo Antonello [A long argument from the start to the end: dialogues with João César de Castro Rocha and Pierpaolo Antonello] (in Portuguese), Rio de Janeiro: Topbooks, ISBN 85-7475-020-4 (French translation: ——— (2004), Les origines de la culture. Entretiens avec Pierpaolo Antonello et João Cezar de Castro Rocha [The origins of culture. Interviews with Pierpaolo Antonello & João César de Castro Rocha] (in French), Paris: Desclée de Brouwer, ISBN 978-2-220-05355-4. The French translation was upgraded in consultation with René Girard. English translation: ——— (2008), Evolution and Conversion: Dialogues on the Origins of Culture, London: Continuum, ISBN 978-0-567-03252-2).
- ——— (2001), Celui par qui le scandale arrive: Entretiens avec Maria Stella Barberi [The one by whom scandal arrives: interviews with Maria Stella Barbieri] (in French), Paris: Desclée de Brouwer, ISBN 978-2-220-05011-9 (English translation: ——— (2014), The One by Whom Scandal Comes, East Lansing: Michigan State University Press).
- 2002. La voix méconnue du réel: une théorie des mythes archaïques et modernes. Paris: Grasset. ISBN 978-2-246-61101-1.
- 2003. Le sacrifice. Paris: Bibliothèque nationale de France. ISBN 978-2-7177-2263-5.
- 2004. Oedipus Unbound: Selected Writings on Rivalry and Desire. Ed. by Mark R. Anspach. Stanford: Stanford University Press. ISBN 978-0-8047-4780-6.
- 2006. Verità o fede debole. Dialogo su cristianesimo e relativismo. With Gianni Vattimo (English: Truth or Weak Faith). Dialogue about Christianity and Relativism. With Gianni Vattimo. A cura di P. Antonello, Transeuropa Edizioni, Massa. ISBN 978-88-7580-018-5
- 2006. Wissenschaft und christlicher Glaube Tübingen: Mohr Siebeck, 2007 ISBN 978-3-16-149266-2 (online: Knowledge and the Christian Faith)
- 2007. Dieu, une invention? Editions de l'Atelier. With André Gounelle and Alain Houziaux. ISBN 978-2-7082-3922-7.
- 2007. Le Tragique et la Pitié: Discours de réception de René Girard à l'Académie française et réponse de Michel Serres. Editions le Pommier. ISBN 978-2-7465-0320-5.
- 2007. De la violence à la divinité. Paris: Grasset. (Contains Mensonge romantique et vérité romanesque, La violence et le Sacré, Des choses cachées depuis la fondation du monde and Le bouc émissaire, with a new general introduction). ISBN 978-2-246-72111-6.
- 2007. Achever Clausewitz. (Entretiens avec Benoît Chantre) Ed. by Carnets Nord. Paris. ISBN 978-2-35536-002-2.
- 2008. Anorexie et désir mimétique. Paris: L'Herne. ISBN 978-2-85197-863-9.
- 2008. Mimesis and Theory: Essays on Literature and Criticism, 1953–2005. Ed. by Robert Doran. Stanford: Stanford University Press. ISBN 978-0-8047-5580-1. This book brings together twenty essays on literature and literary theory.
- 2008. La conversion de l'art. Paris: Carnets Nord. (Book with DVD Le Sens de l'histoire, a conversation with Benoît Chantre) ISBN 978-2-35536-016-9.

== See also ==
- James George Frazer
- Mimetics
- Simulacrum
