= Mimetic theory =

Theory of human desire by René Girard

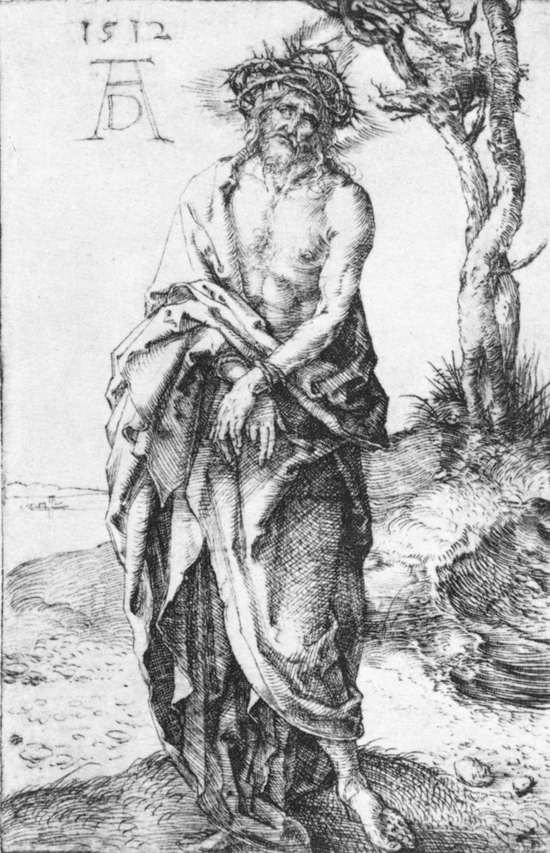
Girard contends that scapegoating serves as a psychological relief for a group of people. He argues that is what happened in the narrative of Jesus of Nazareth, the central figure in Christianity. Pictured is Schmerzensmann (lit. 'man of sorrows'), drypoint by Albrecht Dürer (1512) depicting Jesus.

The mimetic theory of desire, an explanation of human behavior in relation to culture, originated with the French historian, literary critic, and philosopher of social science René Girard (1923–2015). The name of the theory derives from the philosophical concept mimesis, which carries a wide range of meanings. In mimetic theory, mimesis refers to human desire, which Girard thought was not linear but the product of a mimetic process in which people imitate models who endow objects with value. Girard called this phenomenon "mimetic desire", and described mimetic desire as the foundation of his theory:

Man is the creature who does not know what to desire, and he turns to others in order to make up his mind. We desire what others desire because we imitate their desires.

Girard's idea proposes that all desire is merely an imitation of another's desire, and the desire only occurs because others have deemed said object as worthwhile. This means that a desirable object is only desired because of societal ideas, and is not based on personal preference like most believe. The mimetic desire is triangular, based on the subject, model, and object. The subject mimics the model, and both desire the object. Subject and model thus compete for the object(or status) ultimately resulting in conflict. On a societal level, this conflict is resolved by transferring the collective aggression or blame on to an innocent victim or "scapegoat". This collective action unites the community. Yet, this "scapegoat mechanism" also results in continued violence against the victim as the community develops myths that portray the scapegoat as deserving the punishment.

The scapegoat mechanism has one requirement for it to be effective in restoring the peace; all participants in the removal of the scapegoat must genuinely believe that he is guilty. It is also essential that the scapegoat cannot strike back afterwards, so it is common for him to be killed. Once he is gone, peace will quickly be restored, further confirming his "guilt". However, the scapegoat is chosen arbitrarily. The resulting peace is borne from violence, and this form of violence controlling violence has existed since the beginning of civilizations.

Girard believed that we cannot truly escape this mimetic desire, and that any attempts to do so would simply land you playing the game of mimesis on a different level. A new desire for peace must develop in order for the violence of scapegoating to end. However, the model for this desire must somehow rise above the tendency to scapegoat.

In more recent years, mimetic theory was expanded by colleagues and critics of Girard, including Jean-Pierre Dupuy from the angle of economics, Philippe Lacoue-Labarthe from the perspective of philosophy, and Nidesh Lawtoo in mimetic studies. Mimetic studies argues that not only desires, but all affects are mimetic.

== See also ==
- Herd behavior
- Mimesis in literary criticism and philosophy
- Keeping up with the Joneses
- Rivalry (economics)
- Tantalus

== Bibliography ==
- René Girard. I See Satan Fall Like Lightning. New York, NY: Orbis Books, 2001.
- René Girard. and Benoît Chantre. Battling to the End: Conversations with Benoît Chantre. East Lansing, MI: Michigan State University Press, 2009.
- René Girard. Evolution and Conversion: Dialogues on the Origins of Culture. London: Bloomsbury Publishing PLC, 2017.
